= Ming dynasty =

Imperial dynasty of China (1368–1644)

Great Ming: 大明; Dà Míng
- 1368–1644
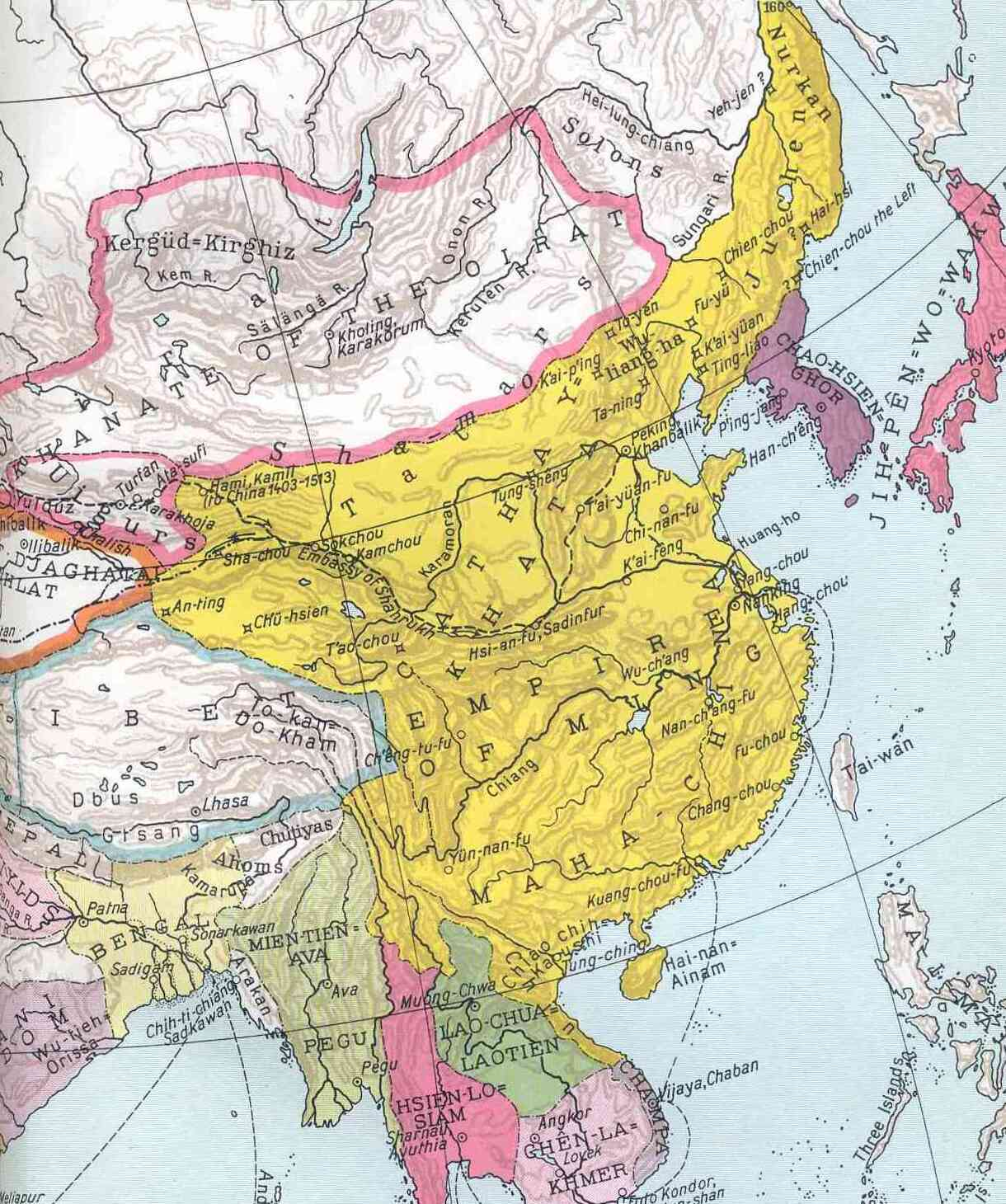
- Ming territory in 1415
- Capital: Nanjing (1368‍–‍1644); Beijing (1403‍–‍1644)
- Common languages: Mandarin (official); other Chinese languages; Turki; Old Uyghur; Tibetan; Mongolian; Jurchen; and others
- Religion: Heaven worship; Taoism; Confucianism; Buddhism; Chinese folk religion; Islam; Roman Catholicism
- Government: Absolute monarchy
- Emperor
  - 1368–1398 (first): Hongwu Emperor
  - 1627–1644 (last): Chongzhen Emperor
- Historical era: Early modern
  - Established in Nanjing (Note: Prior to proclaiming himself emperor, Zhu Yuanzhang declared himself King of Wu in Nanjing in 1364. The regime is known in historiography as the "Western Wu" (西吳).): 23 January 1368
  - Beijing designated as capital: 28 October 1420
  - Fall of Beijing: 25 April 1644
  - End of the Southern Ming (Note: Remnants of the Ming imperial family, whose regimes are collectively called the Southern Ming in historiography, ruled southern China until 1662. The Ming loyalist state Kingdom of Tungning on Taiwan lasted until 1683, but it was not ruled by the Zhu clan and thus usually not considered part of the Southern Ming.): 1662

Area
- 1400: 3,900,000 km^{2} (1,500,000 sq mi)
- 1450: 6,500,000 km^{2} (2,500,000 sq mi)

Population
  - 1393: 65,000,000
  - 1500: 125,000,000
  - 1600: 160,000,000
- GDP (nominal): estimate
  - Per capita: ▼19.8 taels
- Currency: Paper money (1368‍–‍1450); Bimetallic (copper cashes and silver taels)
Preceded by
Yuan dynasty
Succeeded by
Later Jin
Shun dynasty
Xi dynasty
Southern Ming
Qing dynasty

Chinese name
- Chinese: 明朝
Transcriptions
Standard Mandarin
- Hanyu Pinyin: Míngcháo
- Bopomofo: ㄇㄧㄥˊ ㄔㄠˊ
- Wade–Giles: Ming^{2} ch'ao^{2}
- Tongyong Pinyin: Míngcháo
- IPA: [mǐŋ ʈʂʰǎʊ]
Wu
- Suzhounese: Min^{2} zau^{2}
Yue: Cantonese
- Yale Romanization: Mìhng chìuh
- Jyutping: Ming4 ciu4
- IPA: [mɪŋ˩ tsʰiw˩]
Southern Min
- Hokkien POJ: Bêng tiâu
- Tâi-lô: Bîng tiâu

Dynastic name
- Chinese: 大明
Transcriptions
Standard Mandarin
- Hanyu Pinyin: Dà Míng
- Bopomofo: ㄉㄚˋ ㄇㄧㄥˊ
- Wade–Giles: Ta^{4} Ming^{2}
- Tongyong Pinyin: Dà Míng
Wu
- Romanization: Da men
Yue: Cantonese
- Yale Romanization: Daaih Mìhng
- Jyutping: Daai6 ming4
- IPA: [taj˨ mɪŋ˩]
Southern Min
- Hokkien POJ: Tāi-bêng
- Tâi-lô: Tāi-bîng

The Ming dynasty, officially the Great Ming, was an imperial dynasty of China that ruled from 1368 to 1644, following the collapse of the Mongol-led Yuan dynasty. The Ming was the last imperial dynasty of China ruled by the Han people, the majority ethnic group in China. Although the primary capital of Beijing fell in 1644 to a rebellion led by Li Zicheng (who established the short-lived Shun dynasty), numerous rump regimes ruled by remnants of the Ming imperial family, collectively called the Southern Ming, survived until 1662.

The Ming dynasty's founder, the Hongwu Emperor (r. 1368–1398), attempted to create a society of self-sufficient rural communities ordered in a rigid, immobile system that would guarantee and support a permanent class of soldiers for his dynasty: the empire's standing army exceeded one million troops and the navy's dockyards in Nanjing were the largest in the world. He also took great care breaking the power of the court eunuchs and unrelated magnates, enfeoffing his many sons throughout China and attempting to guide these princes through the Huang-Ming Zuxun, a set of published dynastic instructions. This failed when his teenage successor, the Jianwen Emperor, attempted to curtail his uncle's power, prompting the Jingnan campaign, an uprising that placed the Prince of Yan upon the throne as the Yongle Emperor in 1402. The Yongle Emperor established Yan as a secondary capital and renamed it Beijing, constructed the Forbidden City, and restored the Grand Canal and the primacy of the imperial examinations in official appointments. He rewarded his eunuch supporters and employed them as a counterweight against the Confucian scholar-bureaucrats. One eunuch, Zheng He, led seven enormous voyages of exploration into the Indian Ocean as far as Arabia and the eastern coasts of Africa. Hongwu and Yongle emperors had also expanded the empire's rule into Inner Asia.

The rise of new emperors and new factions diminished such extravagances; the capture of the Emperor Yingzong of Ming during the 1449 Tumu Crisis ended them completely. The imperial navy was allowed to fall into disrepair while forced labor constructed the Liaodong palisade and connected and fortified the Great Wall into its modern form. Wide-ranging censuses of the entire empire were conducted decennially, but the desire to avoid labor and taxes and the difficulty of storing and reviewing the enormous archives at Nanjing hampered accurate figures. Estimates for the late-Ming population vary from 160 to 200 million, (Note: For the lower population estimate, see (Fairbank & Goldman 2006:128); for the higher, see (Ebrey 1999:197).) but necessary revenues were squeezed out of smaller and smaller numbers of farmers as more disappeared from the official records or "donated" their lands to tax-exempt eunuchs or temples. Haijin laws intended to protect the coasts from Japanese pirates instead turned many into smugglers and pirates themselves.

By the 16th century, the expansion of European trade—though restricted to islands near Guangzhou such as Macau—spread the Columbian exchange of crops, plants, and animals into China, introducing chili peppers to Sichuan cuisine and highly productive maize and potatoes, which diminished famines and spurred population growth. The growth of Portuguese, Spanish, and Dutch trade created new demand for Chinese products and produced a massive influx of South American silver. This abundance of specie re-monetized the Ming economy, whose paper money had suffered repeated hyperinflation and was no longer trusted. While traditional Confucians opposed such a prominent role for commerce and the newly rich it created, the heterodoxy introduced by Wang Yangming permitted a more accommodating attitude. Zhang Juzheng's initially successful reforms proved devastating when a slowdown in agriculture was produced by the Little Ice Age. The value of silver rapidly increased because of a disruption in the supply of imported silver from Spanish and Portuguese sources, making it impossible for Chinese farmers to pay their taxes. Combined with crop failure, floods, and an epidemic, the dynasty collapsed in 1644 as Li Zicheng's rebel forces entered Beijing. Li then established the Shun dynasty, but it was defeated shortly afterwards by the Manchu-led Eight Banner armies of the Qing dynasty, with the help of the defecting Ming general Wu Sangui.

== History ==
=== Founding ===
==== Revolt and rebel rivalry ====
The Mongol-led Yuan dynasty (1271–1368) ruled before the establishment of the Ming. Explanations for the demise of the Yuan include institutionalized ethnic discrimination against the Han people that stirred resentment and rebellion, overtaxation of areas hard-hit by inflation, and massive flooding of the Yellow River as a result of the abandonment of irrigation projects. Consequently, agriculture and the economy were in shambles, and rebellion broke out among the hundreds of thousands of peasants called upon to work on repairing the levees of the Yellow River. A number of Han groups revolted, including the Red Turbans in 1351. The Red Turbans were affiliated with the White Lotus, a Buddhist secret society. Zhu Yuanzhang was a penniless peasant and Buddhist monk who joined the Red Turbans in 1352; he soon gained a reputation after marrying the foster daughter of a rebel commander. In 1356, Zhu's rebel force captured the city of Nanjing, which he would later establish as the capital of the Ming dynasty.

With the Yuan dynasty crumbling, competing rebel groups began fighting for control of the country and thus the right to establish a new dynasty. In 1363, Zhu Yuanzhang eliminated his archrival and leader of the rebel Han faction, Chen Youliang, in the Battle of Lake Poyang, arguably the largest naval battle in history. Known for its ambitious use of fire ships, Zhu's force of 200,000 Ming sailors were able to defeat a Han rebel force over triple their size, claimed to be 650,000-strong. The victory destroyed the last opposing rebel faction, leaving Zhu Yuanzhang in uncontested control of the bountiful Yangtze valley and cementing his power in the south. After the dynastic head of the Red Turbans suspiciously died in 1367 while a guest of Zhu, there was no one left who was remotely capable of contesting his march to the throne, and he made his imperial ambitions known by sending an army toward the Yuan capital Dadu (present-day Beijing) in 1368. The last Yuan emperor fled north to the upper capital Shangdu, and Zhu declared the founding of the Ming dynasty after razing the Yuan palaces in Dadu to the ground; the city was renamed Beiping in the same year. Zhu Yuanzhang took Hongwu, or "Vastly Martial", as his era name.

==== Reign of the Hongwu Emperor ====
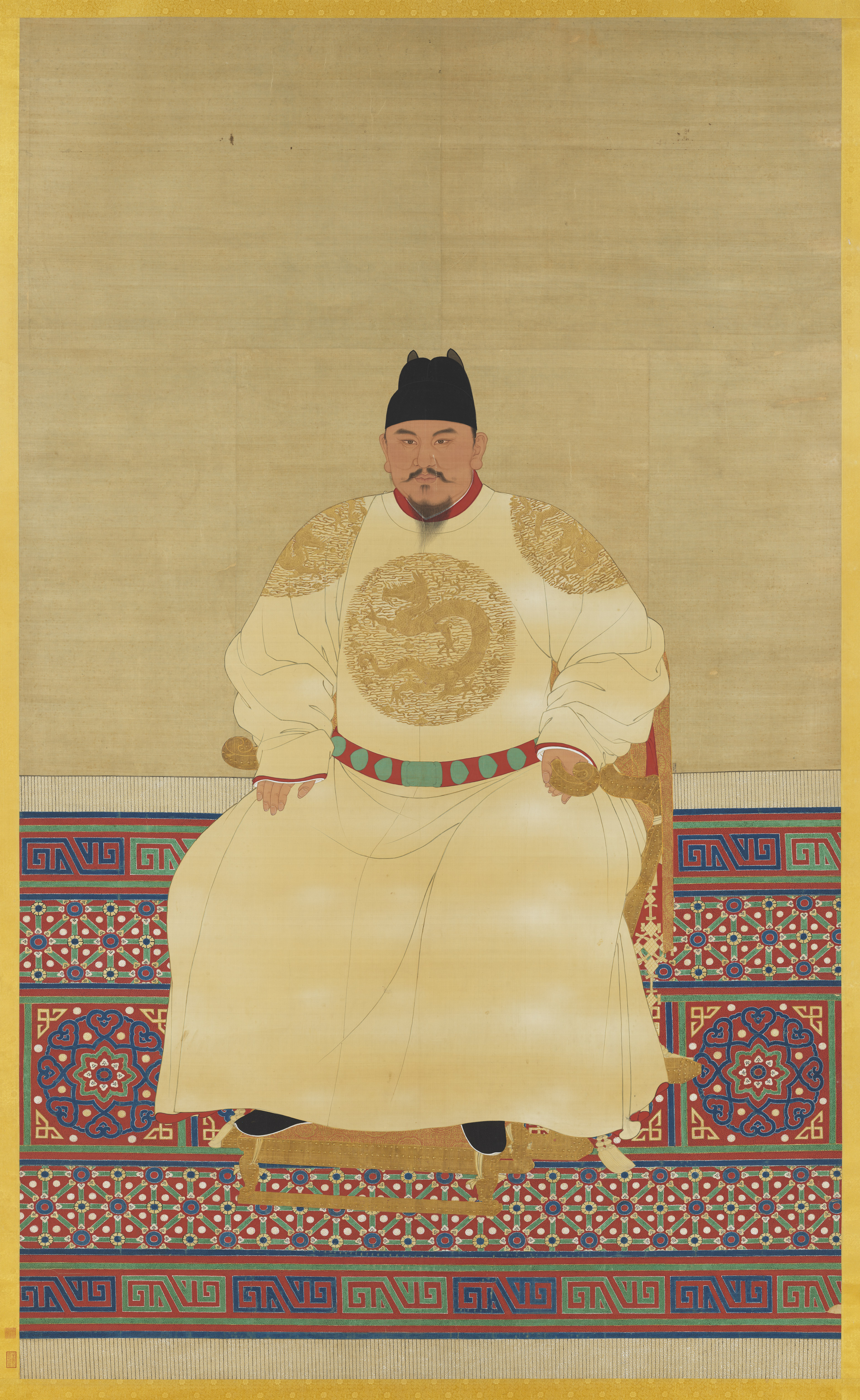
Portrait of the Hongwu Emperor (r. 1368–1398)

The Hongwu Emperor made an immediate effort to rebuild state infrastructure. He built a 48-kilometre-long (30 mi) wall around Nanjing, as well as new palaces and government halls. The History of Ming—the official dynastic history compiled in 1739 by the subsequent Qing dynasty (1644–1912)—states that as early as 1364 Zhu Yuanzhang had begun drafting a new Confucian law code, the Great Ming Code, which was completed by 1397 and repeated certain clauses found in the old Tang Code of 653. The Hongwu Emperor organized a military system known as the weisuo, which was similar to the fubing system of the Tang dynasty (618–907).

In 1380 the Hongwu Emperor had the Chancellor Hu Weiyong executed upon suspicion of a conspiracy plot to overthrow him; after that the Hongwu Emperor abolished the Chancellery and assumed this role as chief executive and emperor, a precedent mostly followed throughout the Ming period. With a growing suspicion of his ministers and subjects, the Hongwu Emperor established the Embroidered Uniform Guard, a network of secret police drawn from his own palace guard. Some 100,000 people were executed in a series of purges during his rule.

The Hongwu Emperor issued many edicts forbidding Mongol practices and proclaiming his intention to purify China of barbarian influence. However, he also sought to use the Yuan legacy to legitimize his authority in China and other areas ruled by the Yuan. He continued policies of the Yuan dynasty such as continued request for Korean concubines and eunuchs, Mongol-style hereditary military institutions, Mongol-style clothing and hats, promoting archery and horseback riding, and having large numbers of Mongols serve in the Ming military. Until the late 16th century, Mongols still constituted one-third of officers serving in capital forces like the Embroidered Uniform Guard, and other peoples such as Jurchens were also prominent. He frequently wrote to Mongol, Japanese, Korean, Jurchen, Tibetan, and Southwest frontier rulers offering advice on their governmental and dynastic policy, and insisted on leaders from these regions visiting the Ming capital for audiences. He resettled 100,000 Mongols into his territory, with many serving as guards in the capital. The emperor also strongly advertised the hospitality and role granted to Chinggisid nobles in his court.

The Hongwu Emperor insisted that he was not a rebel, and he attempted to justify his conquest of the other rebel warlords by claiming that he was a Yuan subject and had been divinely-appointed to restore order by crushing rebels. Most Chinese elites did not view the Yuan's Mongol ethnicity as grounds to resist or reject it. The Hongwu Emperor emphasised that he was not conquering territory from the Yuan dynasty but rather from the rebel warlords. He used this line of argument to attempt to persuade Yuan loyalists to join his cause. The Ming used the tribute they received from former Yuan vassals as proof that the Ming had taken over the Yuan's legitimacy. Tribute missions were regularly celebrated with music and dance in the Ming court.

==== South-Western frontier ====
In 1381, the Ming dynasty annexed the areas of the southwest that had once been part of the Kingdom of Dali following the successful effort by Hui Muslim Ming armies to defeat Mongol and Hui Muslim troops loyal to the Yuan holding out in Yunnan. The Hui troops under General Mu Ying, who was appointed Governor of Yunnan, were resettled in the region as part of a colonization effort. By the end of the 14th century, some 200,000 military colonists settled some 2,000,000 mu (350,000 acres) of land in what is now Yunnan and Guizhou. Roughly half a million more Chinese settlers came in later periods; these migrations caused a major shift in the ethnic make-up of the region, since formerly more than half of the population were non-Han peoples. Resentment over such massive changes in population and the resulting government presence and policies sparked more Miao and Yao revolts in 1464 to 1466, which were crushed by an army of 30,000 Ming troops (including 1,000 Mongols) joining the 160,000 local Guangxi. After the scholar and philosopher Wang Yangming (1472–1529) suppressed another rebellion in the region, he advocated single, unitary administration of Chinese and indigenous ethnic groups in order to bring about sinicisation of the local peoples.

==== Campaign in the North-East ====
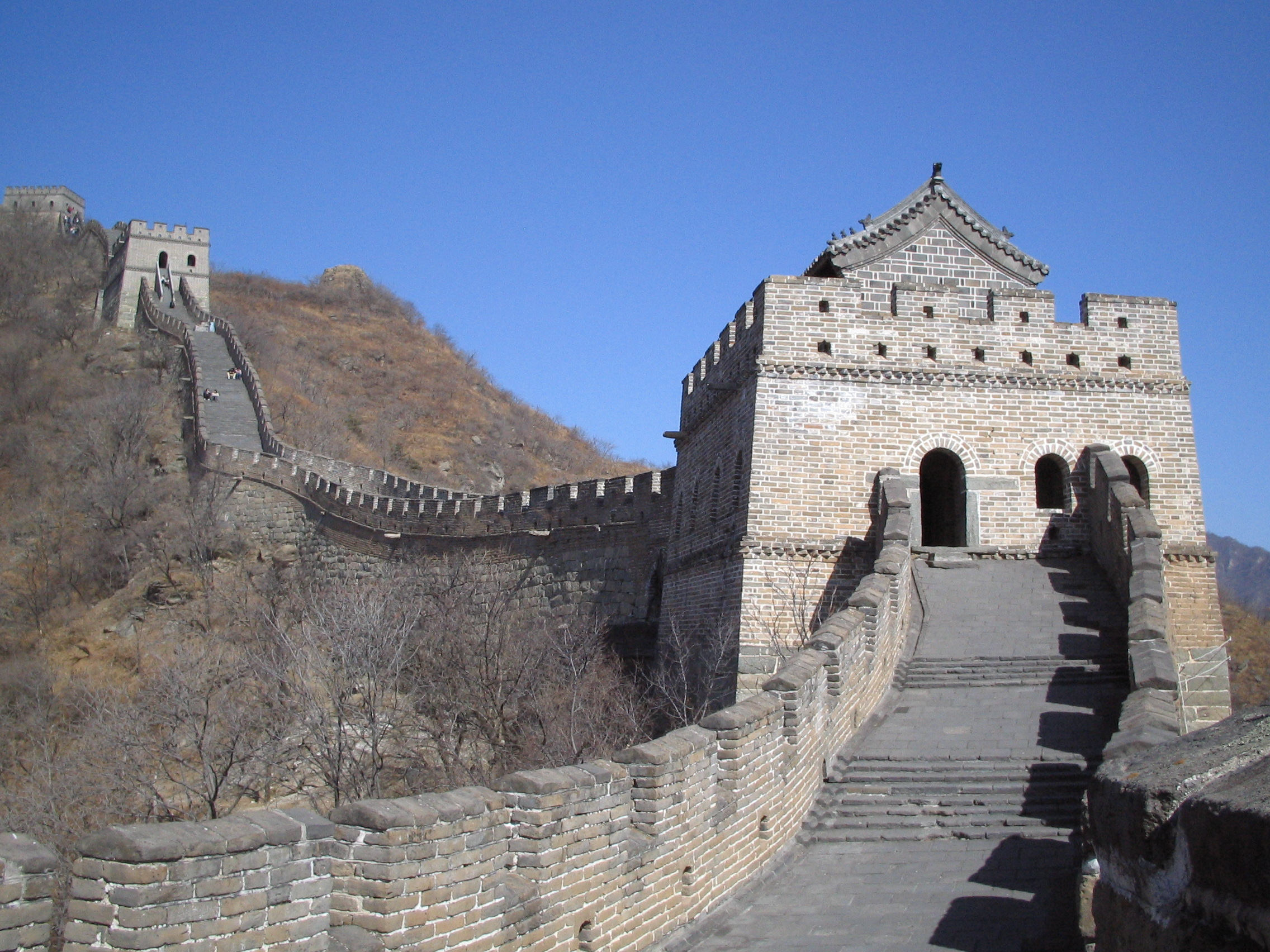
The Great Wall of China: while segments of earlier rammed earth walls were first unified by the Qin and Han dynasties, the vast majority of the brick and stone Great Wall is a product of the Ming.

After the overthrow of the Yuan dynasty in 1368, Manchuria remained under control of the Northern Yuan based in Mongolia. Naghachu, a former Yuan official and a Uriankhai general of the Northern Yuan, won hegemony over the Mongol tribes in Manchuria (the former Yuan province of Liaoyang). He grew strong in the northeast, with forces large enough (numbering hundreds of thousands) to threaten invasion of the newly founded Ming dynasty in order to restore the Mongols to power in China. The Ming decided to defeat him instead of waiting for the Mongols to attack. In 1387 the Ming sent a military campaign to attack Naghachu, which concluded with the surrender of Naghachu and Ming conquest of Manchuria.

The early Ming court could not, and did not, aspire to the control imposed upon the Jurchens in Manchuria by the Mongols, yet it created a norm of organization that would ultimately serve as the main instrument for the relations with peoples along the northeast frontiers. By the end of the Hongwu Emperor's reign, the essentials of a policy toward the Jurchens had taken shape. Most of the inhabitants of Manchuria, except for the Wild Jurchens, were at peace with China. In 1409, under the Yongle Emperor, the Ming established the Nurgan Regional Military Commission on the banks of the Amur River, and Yishiha, a eunuch of Haixi Jurchen origin, was ordered to lead an expedition to the mouth of the Amur to pacify the Wild Jurchens. After the death of Yongle Emperor, the Nurgan Regional Military Commission was abolished in 1435, and the Ming court ceased to have substantial activities there, although the guards continued to exist in Manchuria. Throughout its existence, the Ming established a total of 384 guards (衛, wei) and 24 battalions (所, suo) in Manchuria, but these were probably only nominal offices and did not necessarily imply political control. By the late Ming period, Ming's political presence in Manchuria has declined significantly.

==== Relations with Tibet ====
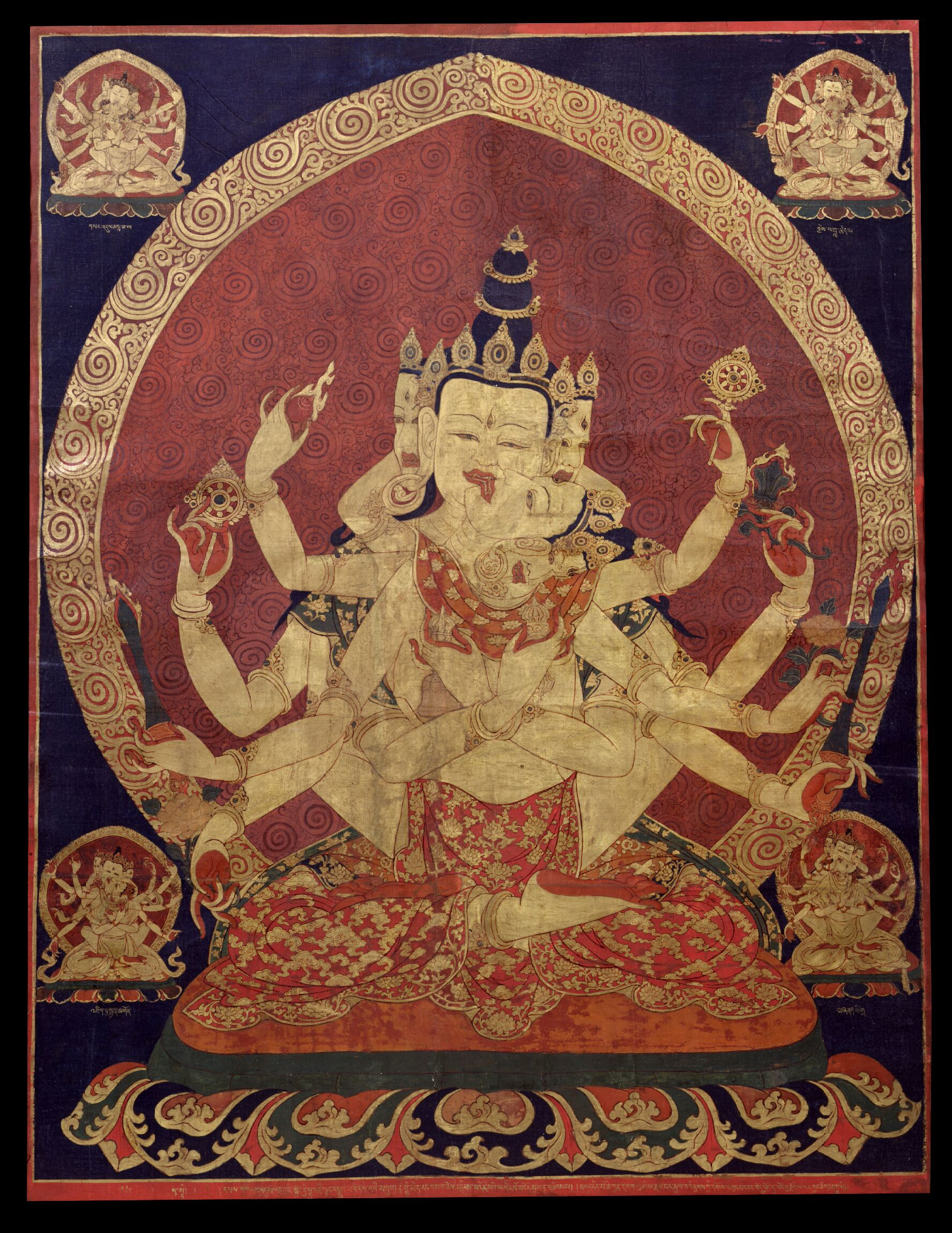
A 17th-century Tibetan thangka of Guhyasamaja Akshobhyavajra; the Ming court gathered various tribute items that were native products of Tibet (such as thangkas), and in return granted gifts to Tibetan tribute-bearers.

The History of Ming states that the Ming established itinerant commanderies overseeing Tibetan administration while also renewing titles of ex-Yuan dynasty officials from Tibet and conferring new princely titles on leaders of Tibetan Buddhist sects. However, Turrell V. Wylie states that censorship in the History of Ming in favor of bolstering the Ming emperor's prestige and reputation at all costs obfuscates the nuanced history of Sino-Tibetan relations during the Ming era.

Modern scholars debate whether the Ming had sovereignty over Tibet. Some believe it was a relationship of loose suzerainty that was largely cut off when the Jiajing Emperor (r. 1521–1567) persecuted Buddhism in favor of Taoism at court. Others argue that the significant religious nature of the relationship with Tibetan lamas is underrepresented in modern scholarship. Others note the Ming need for Central Asian horses and the need to maintain the tea-horse trade.

The Ming sporadically sent armed forays into Tibet during the 14th century, which the Tibetans successfully resisted. Several scholars point out that unlike the preceding Mongols, the Ming did not garrison permanent troops in Tibet. The Wanli Emperor (r. 1572–1620) attempted to reestablish Sino-Tibetan relations in the wake of a Mongol–Tibetan alliance initiated in 1578, an alliance which affected the foreign policy of the subsequent Qing dynasty in their support for the Dalai Lama of the Yellow Hat sect. By the late 16th century, the Mongols proved to be successful armed protectors of the Yellow Hat Dalai Lama after their increasing presence in the Amdo region, culminating in the conquest of Tibet by Güshi Khan (1582–1655) in 1642, establishing the Khoshut Khanate.

=== Reign of the Yongle Emperor ===
==== Rise to power ====
Portrait of the Yongle Emperor (r. 1402–1424)

The Hongwu Emperor specified his grandson Zhu Yunwen as his successor, and he assumed the throne as the Jianwen Emperor (r. 1398–1402) after the Hongwu Emperor's death in 1398. The Jianwen Emperor's uncle Zhu Di, the most powerful of the Hongwu Emperor's sons, opposed his ascension and soon came into conflict with the young emperor. After the Jianwen Emperor arrested many of Zhu Di's associates, Zhu Di plotted a rebellion that sparked a three-year civil war. Under the pretext of rescuing the Jianwen Emperor from corrupting officials, Zhu Di personally led forces in the revolt; the palace in Nanjing was burned to the ground, along with the Jianwen Emperor himself, his wife, mother, and courtiers. Zhu Di assumed the throne as the Yongle Emperor (r. 1402–1424); his reign is universally viewed by scholars as a "second founding" of the Ming dynasty since he reversed many of his father's policies.

==== New capital and foreign engagement ====
The Yongle Emperor demoted Nanjing to a secondary capital and in 1403 announced the new capital of China was to be at his power base in Beijing. Construction of a new city there lasted from 1407 to 1420, employing hundreds of thousands of workers daily. At the center was the political node of the Imperial City, and at the center of this was the Forbidden City, the palatial residence of the emperor and his family. By 1553, the Outer City was added to the south, which brought the overall size of Beijing to 6.5 by 7 kilometres (4 by 4 1/2 miles).

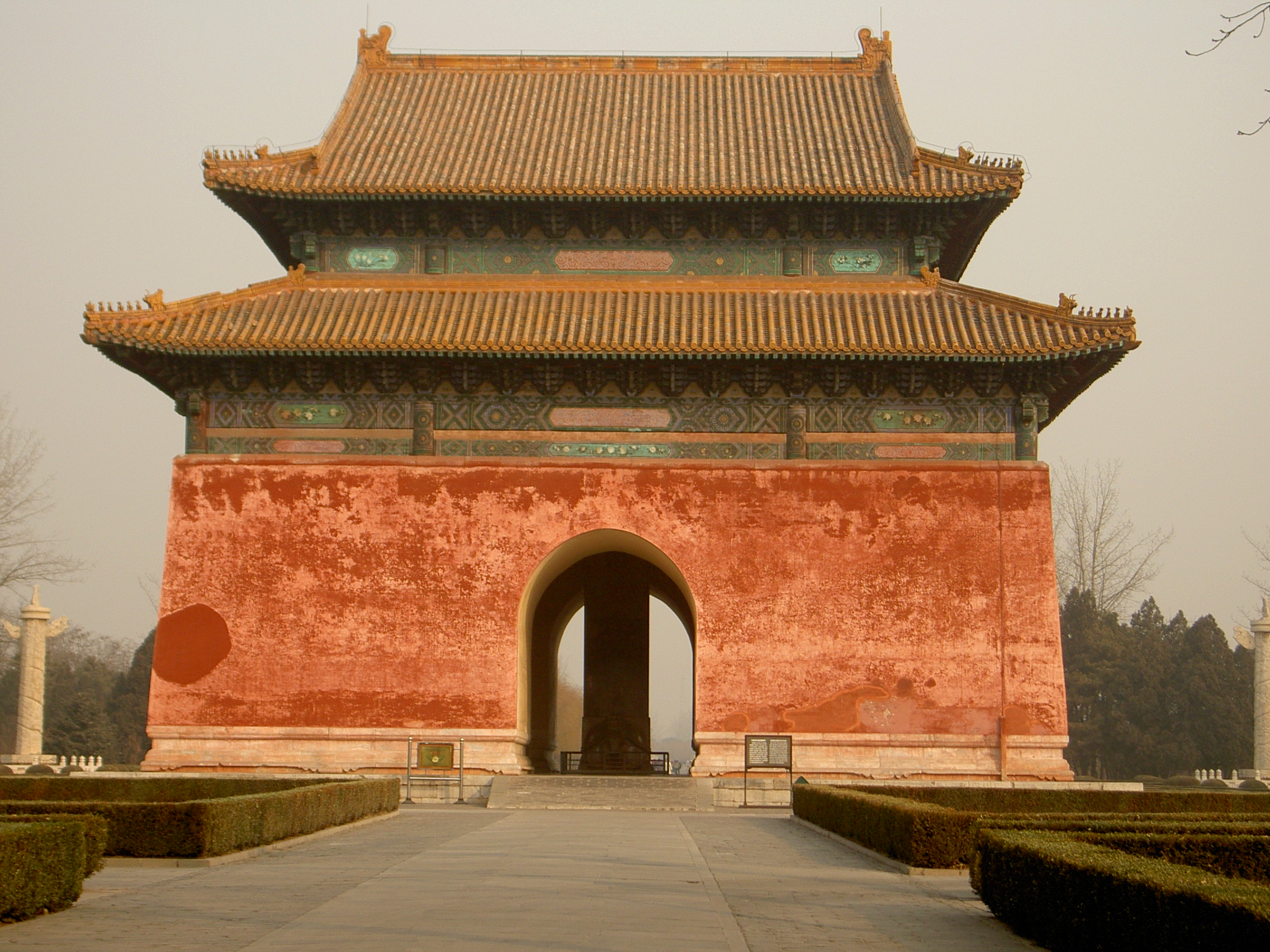
The Ming tombs, located 50 km (31 mi) north of Beijing

Beginning in 1405, the Yongle Emperor entrusted his favored eunuch commander Zheng He (1371–1433) as the admiral for a gigantic new fleet of ships designated for international tributary missions. Among the kingdoms visited by Zheng He, the Yongle Emperor proclaimed the Kingdom of Cochin to be its protectorate. The Chinese had sent diplomatic missions over land since the Han dynasty (202 BCE – 220 CE) and engaged in private overseas trade, but these missions were unprecedented in grandeur and scale. To service seven different tributary voyages, the Nanjing shipyards constructed two thousand vessels from 1403 to 1419, including treasure ships measuring 112 to 134 m (367 to 440 ft) in length and 45 to 54 m (148 to 177 ft) in width.

The Yongle Emperor used woodblock printing to spread Chinese culture. He also used the military to expand China's borders. This included the brief occupation of Vietnam, from the initial invasion in 1406 until the Ming withdrawal in 1427 as a result of protracted guerrilla warfare led by Lê Lợi, the founder of the Vietnamese Lê dynasty.

=== Tumu Crisis and the Ming Mongols ===
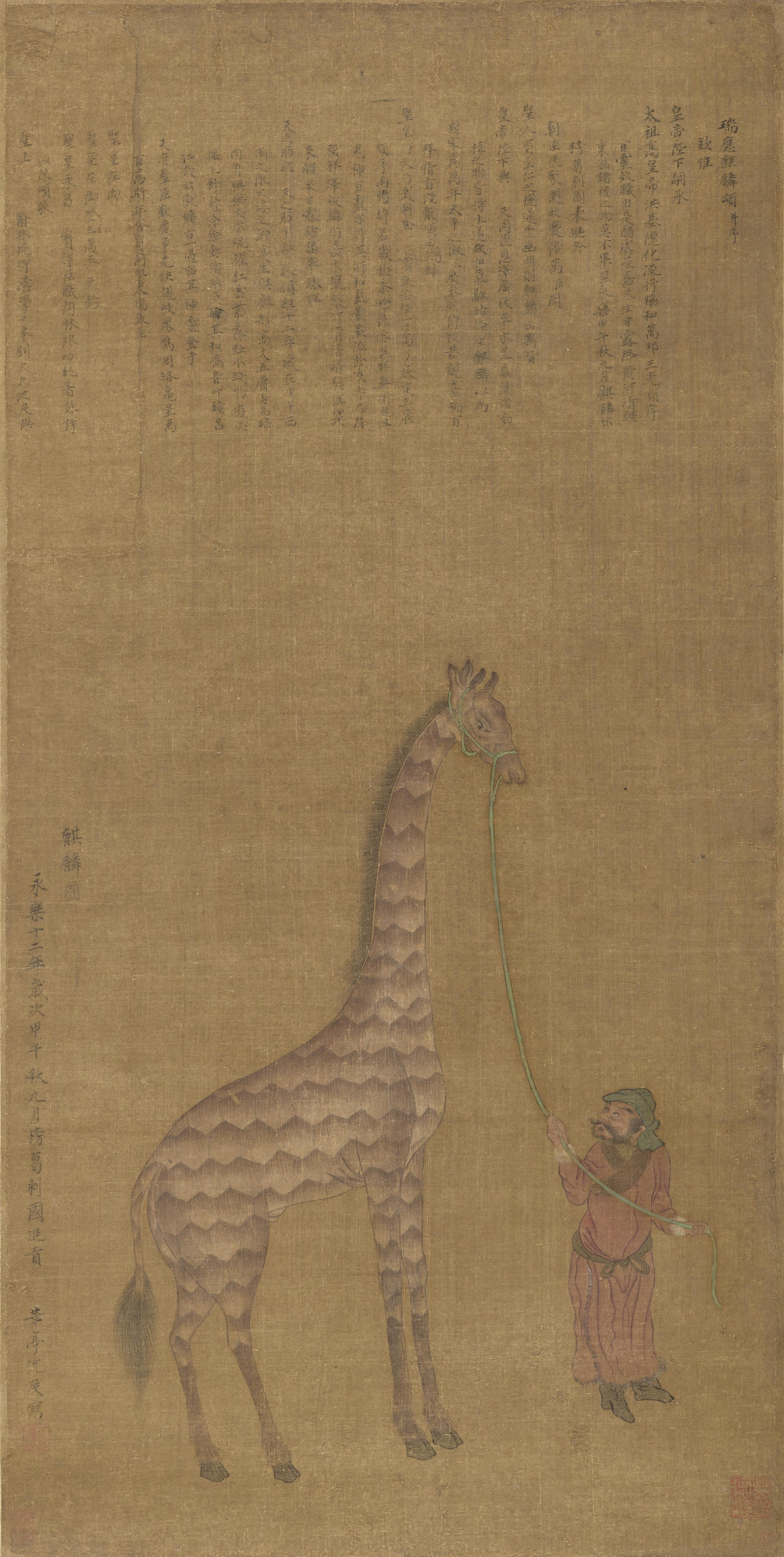
A Bengali envoy presenting a giraffe as a tributary gift in the name of King Saif Al-Din Hamzah Shah of Bengal (r. 1410–1412) to the Yongle Emperor

The Oirat leader Esen Tayisi launched an invasion into Ming China in July 1449. The chief eunuch Wang Zhen encouraged the Zhengtong Emperor (r. 1435–1449) to lead a force personally to face the Oirats after a recent Ming defeat; the emperor left the capital and put his half-brother Zhu Qiyu in charge of affairs as temporary regent. On 8 September, Esen routed Zhengtong's army, and Zhengtong was captured—an event known as the Tumu Crisis. The Oirats held the Zhengtong Emperor for ransom. However, this scheme was foiled once the emperor's younger brother assumed the throne under the era name Jingtai (r. 1449–1457); the Oirats were also repelled once the Jingtai Emperor's confidant and defense minister Yu Qian (1398–1457) gained control of the Ming armed forces. Holding the Zhengtong Emperor in captivity was a useless bargaining chip for the Oirats as long as another sat on his throne, so they released him back into Ming China. The former emperor was placed under house arrest in the palace until the coup against the Jingtai Emperor in 1457 known as the "Wresting the Gate Incident". The former emperor retook the throne under the new era name Tianshun (r. 1457–1464).

Tianshun proved to be a troubled time and Mongol forces within the Ming military structure continued to be problematic. On 7 August 1461, the Chinese general Cao Qin and his Ming troops of Mongol descent staged a coup against the Tianshun Emperor out of fear of being next on his purge-list of those who aided him in the Wresting the Gate Incident. Cao's rebel force managed to set fire to the western and eastern gates of the Imperial City (doused by rain during the battle) and killed several leading ministers before his forces were finally cornered and he was forced to commit suicide.

While the Yongle Emperor had staged five major offensives north of the Great Wall against the Mongols and the Oirats, the constant threat of Oirat incursions prompted the Ming authorities to fortify the Great Wall from the late 15th century to the 16th century; nevertheless, John Fairbank notes that "it proved to be a futile military gesture but vividly expressed China's siege mentality." Yet the Great Wall was not meant to be a purely defensive fortification; its towers functioned rather as a series of lit beacons and signalling stations to allow rapid warning to friendly units of advancing enemy troops.

=== Decline ===
==== Reign of the Wanli Emperor ====
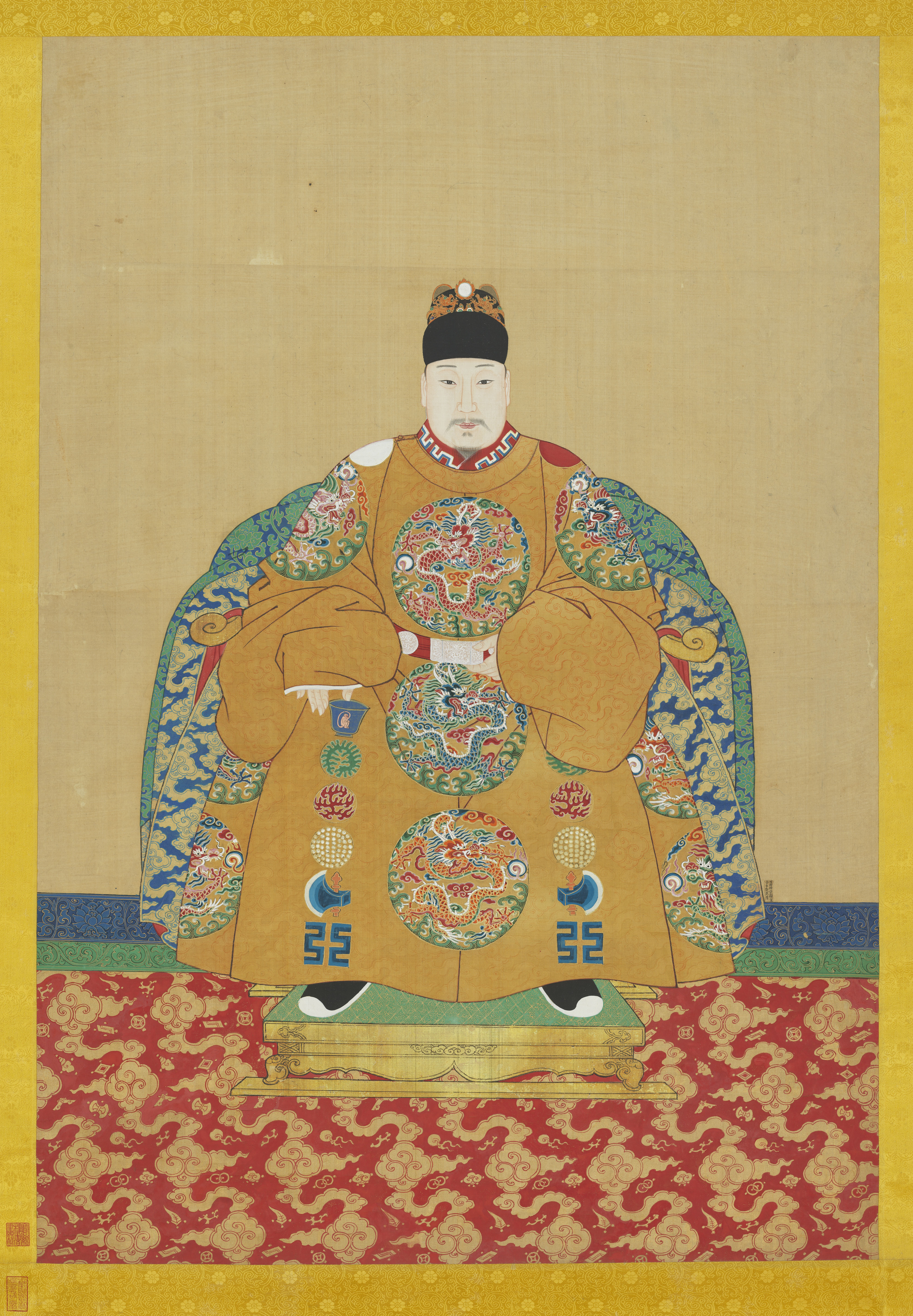
Portrait of the Wanli Emperor (r. 1572–1620)

The reign of the Wanli Emperor (1572–1620) featured many problems, some of them fiscal in nature. In the beginning of his reign, Wanli surrounded himself with able advisors and made a conscientious effort to handle state affairs. His Grand Secretary Zhang Juzheng (1572–1582) built up an effective network of alliances with senior officials. However, there was no one after him skilled enough to maintain the stability of these alliances; officials soon banded together in opposing political factions. Over time Wanli grew tired of court affairs and frequent political quarreling amongst his ministers, preferring to stay behind the walls of the Forbidden City and out of his officials' sight. Scholar-officials lost prominence in administration as eunuchs became intermediaries between the aloof emperor and his officials; any senior official who wanted to discuss state matters had to persuade powerful eunuchs with a bribe simply to have his demands or message relayed to the emperor. There were several military campaigns during the Wanli Emperor's reign, Ordos campaign, the response to the Bozhou rebellion, and the Imjin War.

==== Role of eunuchs ====
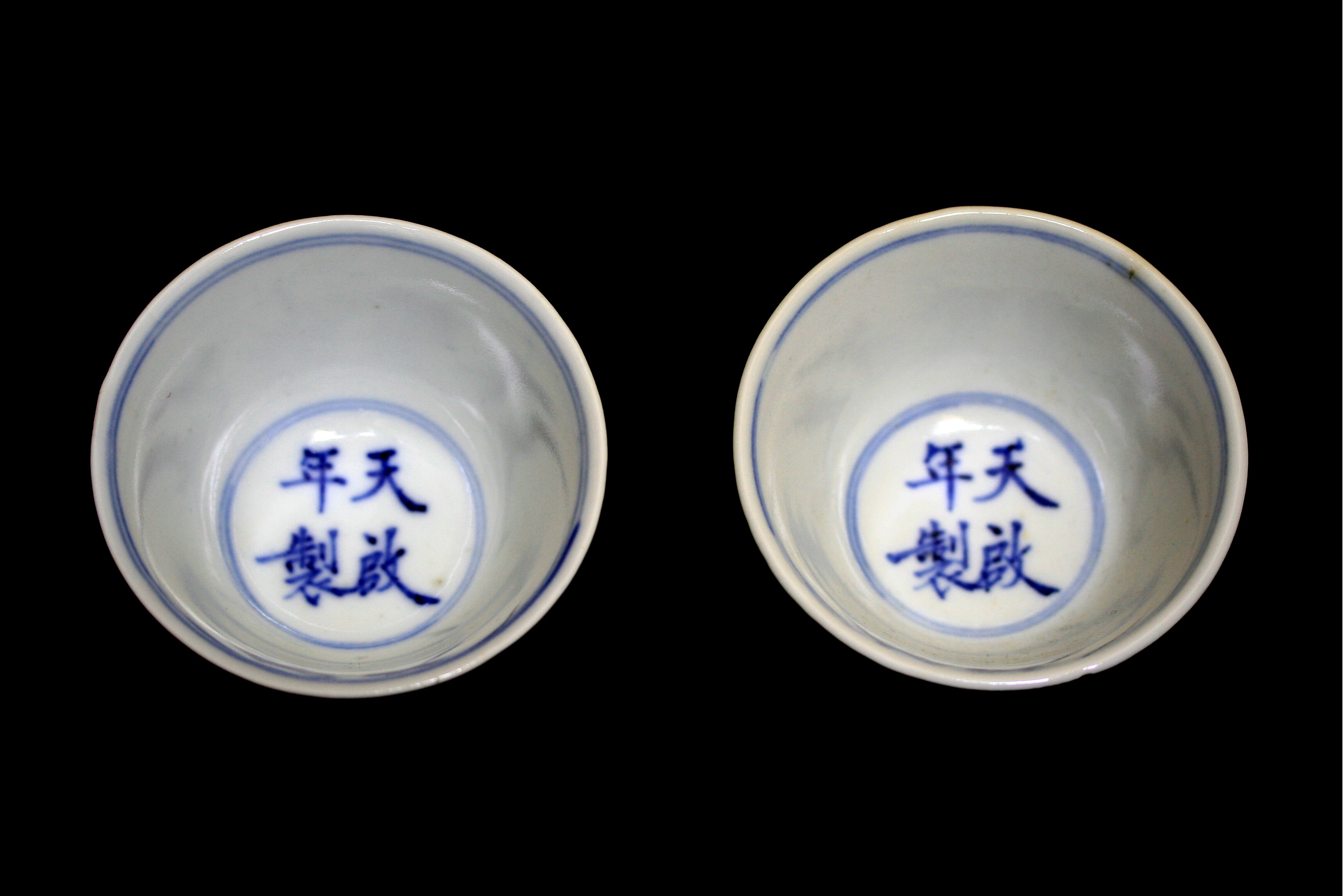
Tianqi-era teacups, from the Nantoyōsō Collection in Japan; the Tianqi Emperor was heavily influenced and largely controlled by the eunuch Wei Zhongxian (1568–1627).

The Hongwu Emperor forbade eunuchs to learn how to read or engage in politics. Whether or not these restrictions were carried out with absolute success in his reign, eunuchs during the Yongle Emperor's reign (1402–1424) and afterwards managed huge imperial workshops, commanded armies, and participated in matters of appointment and promotion of officials. The Yongle Emperor put 75 eunuchs in charge of foreign policy; they traveled frequently to vassal states including Annam, Mongolia, the Ryukyu Islands, and Tibet and less frequently to farther-flung places like Japan and Nepal. In the later 15th century, however, eunuch envoys generally only traveled to Korea.

The eunuchs developed their own bureaucracy that was organized parallel to but was not subject to the civil service bureaucracy. Although there were several dictatorial eunuchs throughout the Ming, such as Wang Zhen, Wang Zhi, and Liu Jin, excessive tyrannical eunuch power did not become evident until the 1590s when the Wanli Emperor increased their rights over the civil bureaucracy and granted them power to collect provincial taxes.

The eunuch Wei Zhongxian (1568–1627) dominated the court of the Tianqi Emperor (r. 1620–1627) and had his political rivals tortured to death, mostly the vocal critics from the faction of the Donglin Society. He ordered temples built in his honor throughout the Ming Empire, and built personal palaces created with funds allocated for building the previous emperor's tombs. His friends and family gained important positions without qualifications. Wei also published a historical work lambasting and belittling his political opponents. Constant changes at court became the norm, and there was also an intensification of natural disasters, epidemics, rebellions, and foreign invasions. Although the Chongzhen Emperor (r. 1627–1644) dismissed Wei, who later committed suicide, problems involving palace eunuchs persisted until the fall of the dynasty, which occurred less than twenty years later.

==== Economic breakdown and natural disasters ====
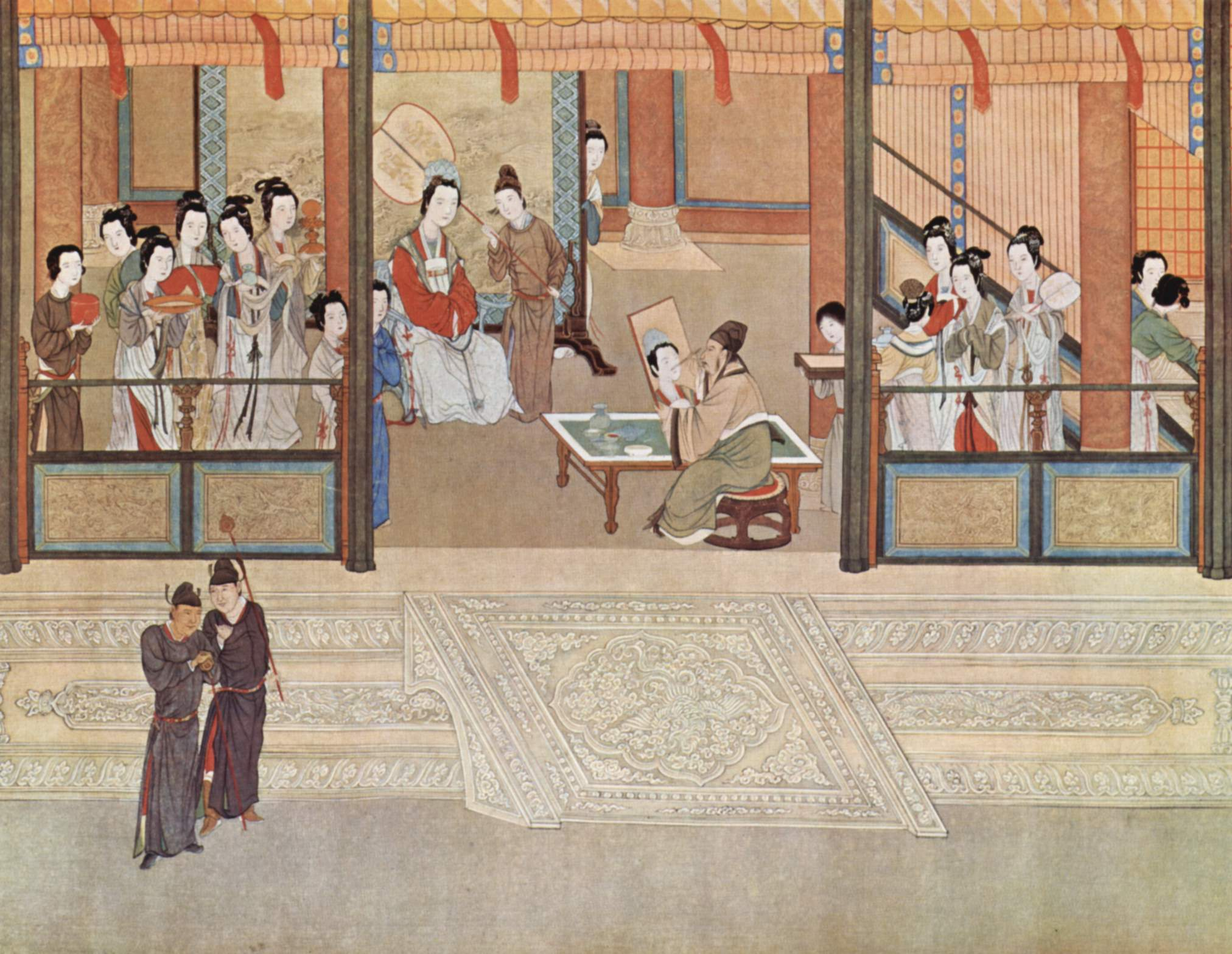
Spring morning in a Han palace, by Qiu Ying (1494–1552); excessive luxury and decadence marked the late Ming period, spurred by the enormous state bullion of incoming silver and by private transactions involving silver.

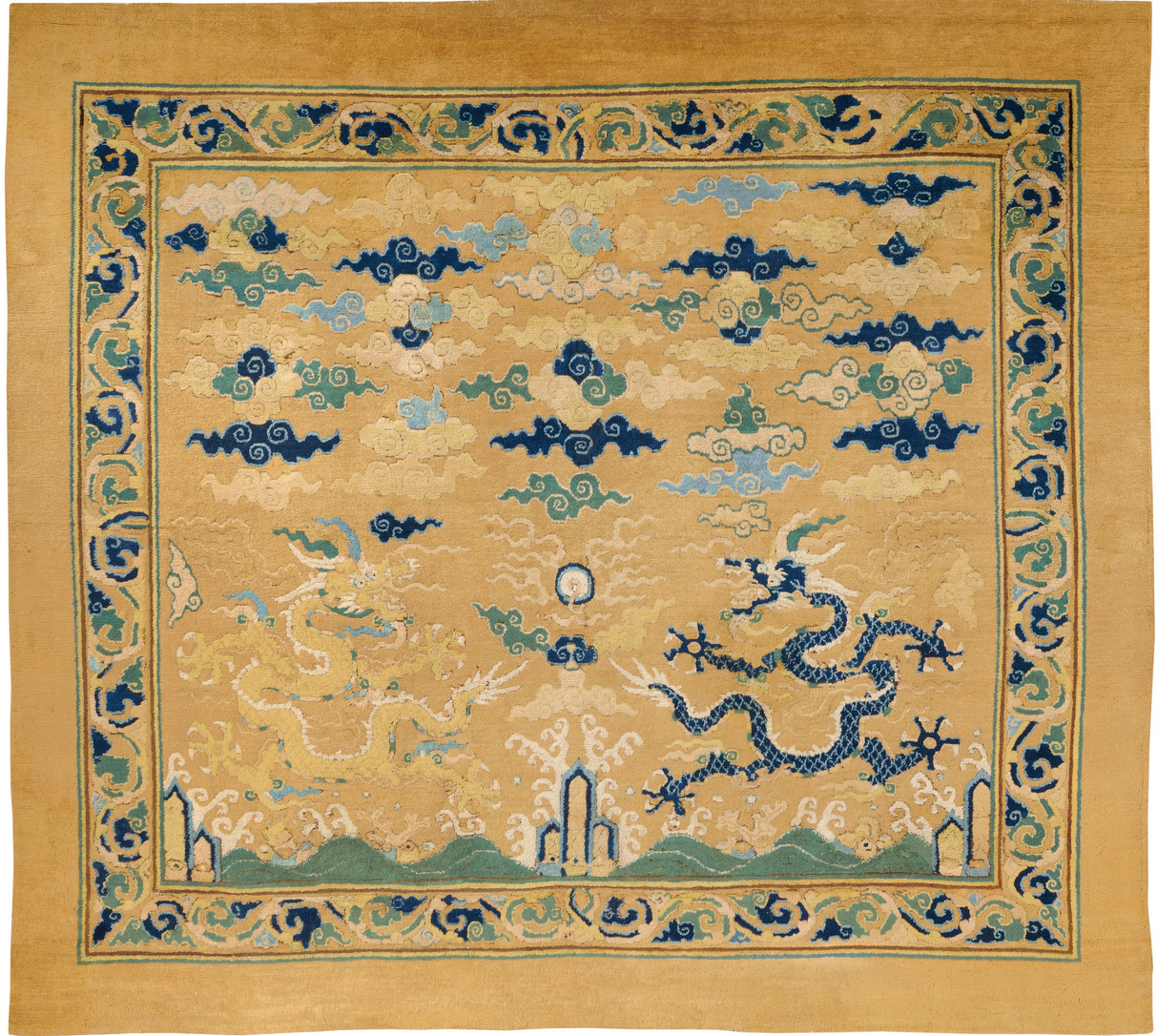
An imperial throne carpet with double dragon and seed pearl motif, 16th century

During the last years of the Wanli era and those of his two successors, an economic crisis developed that was centered on a sudden widespread lack of the empire's chief medium of exchange: silver. The Portuguese first established trade with China in 1516. Following the Ming Emperor's decision to ban direct trade with Japan, Portuguese traders acted as an intermediary between China and Japan by buying Chinese silks from China and selling it to Japan for silver. After some initial hostilities the Portuguese gained consent from the Ming court in 1557 to settle Macau as their permanent trade base in China. Their role in providing silver was gradually surpassed by the Spanish, while even the Dutch challenged them for control of this trade. Philip IV of Spain (r. 1621–1665) began cracking down on illegal smuggling of silver from New Spain and Peru across the Pacific through the Philippines towards China, in favor of shipping silver mined in the Spanish Latin American colonies through Spanish ports. People began hoarding precious silver as there was progressively less of it, forcing the ratio of the value of copper to silver into a steep decline. In the 1630s a string of one thousand copper coins equaled an ounce of silver; by 1640 that sum could fetch half an ounce; and, by 1643 only one-third of an ounce. For peasants this meant economic disaster, since they paid taxes in silver while conducting local trade and crop sales in copper. Atwell and others have argued that disruptions to silver imports in the 1630s–40s were central to the Ming fiscal collapse.

Famines became common in northern China in the early 17th century because of unusually dry and cold weather that shortened the growing season—effects of a larger ecological event now known as the Little Ice Age. Famine, alongside tax increases, widespread military desertions, a declining relief system, and natural disasters such as flooding and inability of the government to properly manage irrigation and flood-control projects caused widespread loss of life and normal civility. The central government, starved of resources, could do very little to mitigate the effects of these calamities. Making matters worse, a widespread epidemic, the Great Plague of 1633–1644, spread across China from Zhejiang to Henan, killing an unknown but large number of people. One of the deadliest earthquakes of all time, the Shaanxi earthquake of 1556, occurred during the Jiajing Emperor's reign, killing approximately 830,000 people.

=== Fall of the dynasty ===
==== Rise of the Manchus ====
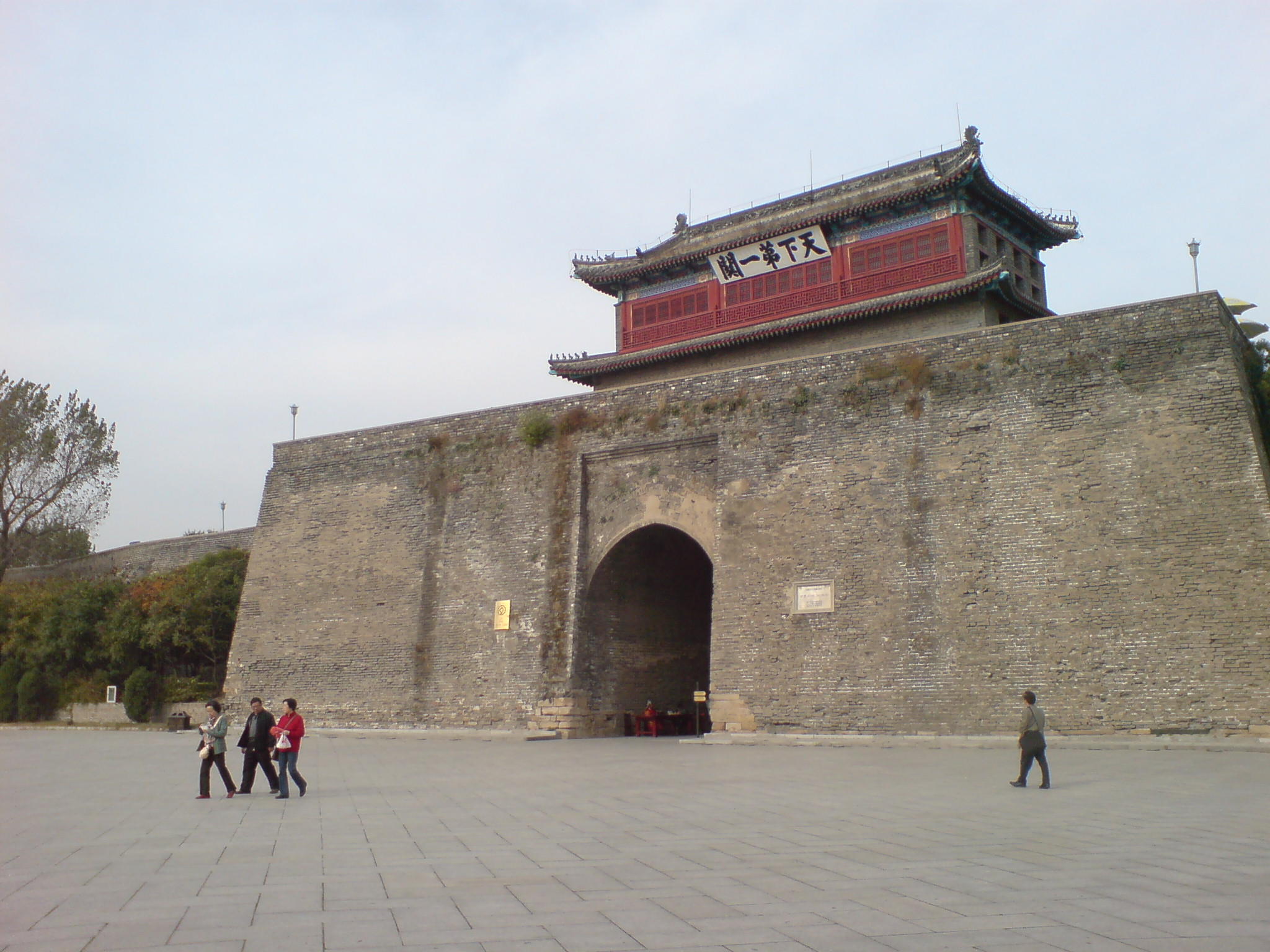
Shanhai Pass along the Great Wall, the gate where the Manchus were repeatedly repelled before being finally let through by Wu Sangui in 1644

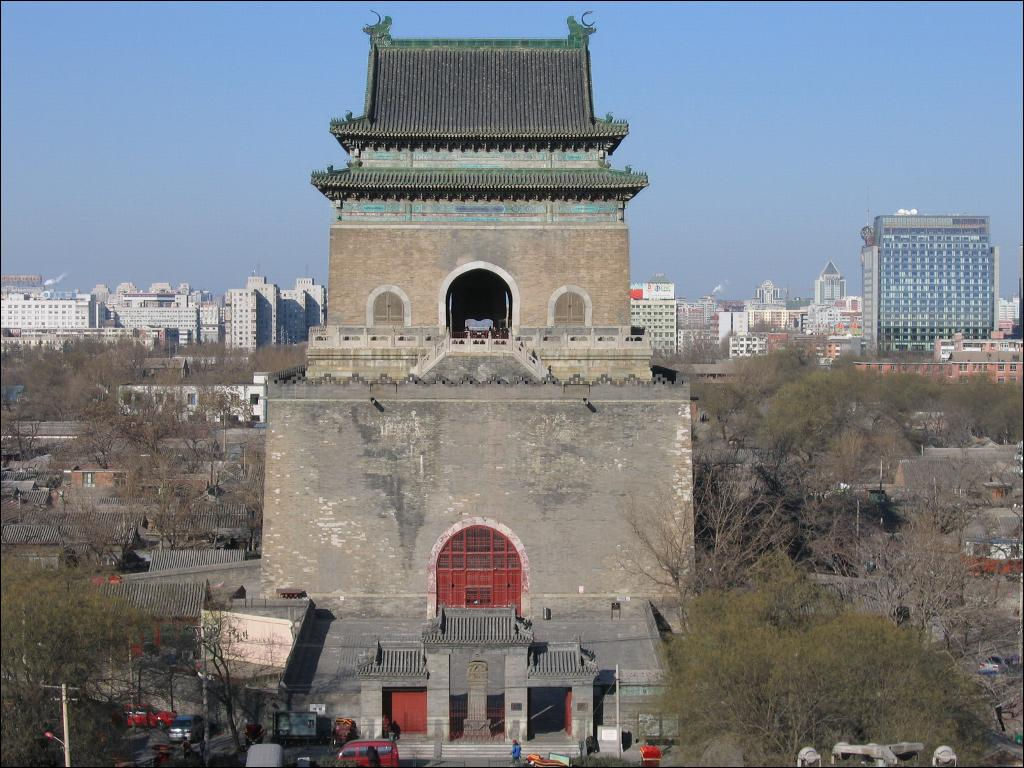
The Drum Tower and Bell Tower of Beijing was built in the Yuan and rebuilt in the Ming.

Originally a Ming vassal who officially considered himself a guardian of the Ming border and a local representative of imperial Ming power, Nurhaci, leader of the Jianzhou Jurchens, unified other Jurchen clans to create a new Manchu ethnic identity. He offered to lead his armies to support Ming and Joseon armies against the Japanese invasions of Korea in the 1590s. Ming officials declined the offer, but granted him the title of dragon-tiger general for his gesture. Recognizing the weakness of Ming authority in Manchuria at the time, he consolidated power by co-opting or conquering surrounding territories. In 1616 he declared himself Khan and established the Later Jin dynasty in reference to the previous Jurchen-ruled Jin dynasty. In 1618, he openly renounced the Ming overlordship and effectively declared war against the Ming with the "Seven Grievances".

In 1636, Nurhaci's son Hong Taiji renamed his dynasty the "Great Qing" at Mukden (modern Shenyang), which had been made their capital in 1625. Hong Taiji also adopted the Chinese imperial title huangdi, declared the Chongde ("Revering Virtue") era, and changed the ethnic name of his people from "Jurchen" to "Manchu". In 1636, Banner Armies defeated Joseon during the Second Manchu invasion of Korea and forced Joseon to become a Qing tributary. Shortly after, the Koreans renounced their long-held loyalty to the Ming dynasty.

==== Rebellion, invasion, collapse ====
A peasant soldier named Li Zicheng mutinied with his fellow soldiers in western Shaanxi in the early 1630s after the Ming government failed to ship much-needed supplies there. In 1634 he was captured by a Ming general and released only on the terms that he return to service. The agreement soon broke down when a local magistrate had thirty-six of his fellow rebels executed; Li's troops retaliated by killing the officials and continued to lead a rebellion based in Rongyang, Henan by 1635. By the 1640s, an ex-soldier and rival to Li—Zhang Xianzhong (1606–1647)—had created a firm rebel base in Chengdu, Sichuan, with the establishment of the Xi dynasty, while Li's center of power was in Hubei with extended influence over Shaanxi and Henan.

In 1640, masses of Chinese peasants who were starving, unable to pay their taxes, and no longer in fear of the frequently defeated Chinese army, began to form into huge bands of rebels. The Chinese military, caught between fruitless efforts to defeat the Manchu raiders from the north and huge peasant revolts in the provinces, essentially fell apart. Unpaid and unfed, the army was defeated by Li Zicheng—now self-styled as the Prince of Shun—and deserted the capital without much of a fight. On 25 April 1644, Beijing fell to a rebel army led by Li Zicheng when the city gates were opened by rebel allies from within. During the turmoil, Chongzhen, the last Ming emperor, accompanied only by a eunuch servant, hanged himself on a tree in the imperial garden right outside the Forbidden City.

Seizing opportunity, the Eight Banners crossed the Great Wall after the Ming border general Wu Sangui (1612–1678) opened the gates at Shanhai Pass. This occurred shortly after he learned about the fate of the capital and an army of Li Zicheng marching towards him; weighing his options of alliance, he decided to side with the Manchus. The Eight Banners under the Manchu Prince Dorgon (1612–1650) and Wu Sangui approached Beijing after the army sent by Li was destroyed at Shanhaiguan; the Prince of Shun's army fled the capital on the fourth of June. On 6 June, the Manchus and Wu entered the capital and proclaimed the young Shunzhi Emperor ruler of China. After being forced out of Xi'an by the Qing, chased along the Han River to Wuchang, and finally along the northern border of Jiangxi, Li Zicheng died there in the summer of 1645, thus ending the Shun dynasty. One report says his death was a suicide; another states that he was beaten to death by peasants after he was caught stealing their food.

Despite the loss of Beijing and the death of the emperor, the Ming were not yet totally destroyed. Nanjing, Fujian, Guangdong, Shanxi, and Yunnan were all strongholds of Ming resistance. However, there were several pretenders for the Ming throne, and their forces were divided. These scattered Ming remnants in southern China after 1644 were collectively designated by 19th-century historians as the Southern Ming. Each bastion of resistance was individually defeated by the Qing until 1662, when the last Southern Ming emperor, Zhu Youlang, the Yongli Emperor, was captured and executed. In 1683, the Qing forces conquered Taiwan and dismantled the Kingdom of Tungning, which had been established by Zheng Chenggong and was the final stronghold of forces loyal to the Ming dynasty.

== Government ==
=== Province, prefecture, sub-prefecture and county ===
Described as "one of the greatest eras of orderly government and social stability in human history" by Edwin O. Reischauer, John K. Fairbank and Albert M. Craig, the Ming emperors took over the provincial administration system of the Yuan dynasty, and the thirteen Ming provinces are the precursors of the modern provinces. Throughout the Song dynasty, the largest political division was the circuit. However, after the Jurchen invasion in 1127, the Song court established four semi-autonomous regional command systems based on territorial and military units, with a detached service secretariat that would become the provincial administrations of the Yuan, Ming, and Qing dynasties. Copied on the Yuan model, the Ming provincial bureaucracy contained three commissions: one civil, one military, and one for surveillance. Below the level of the province were prefectures operating under a prefect (zhifu 知府), followed by subprefectures under a subprefect. The lowest unit was the county, overseen by a magistrate. Besides the provinces, there were also two large areas that belonged to no province, but were metropolitan areas attached to Nanjing and Beijing.

=== Institutions and bureaus ===
==== Institutional trends ====
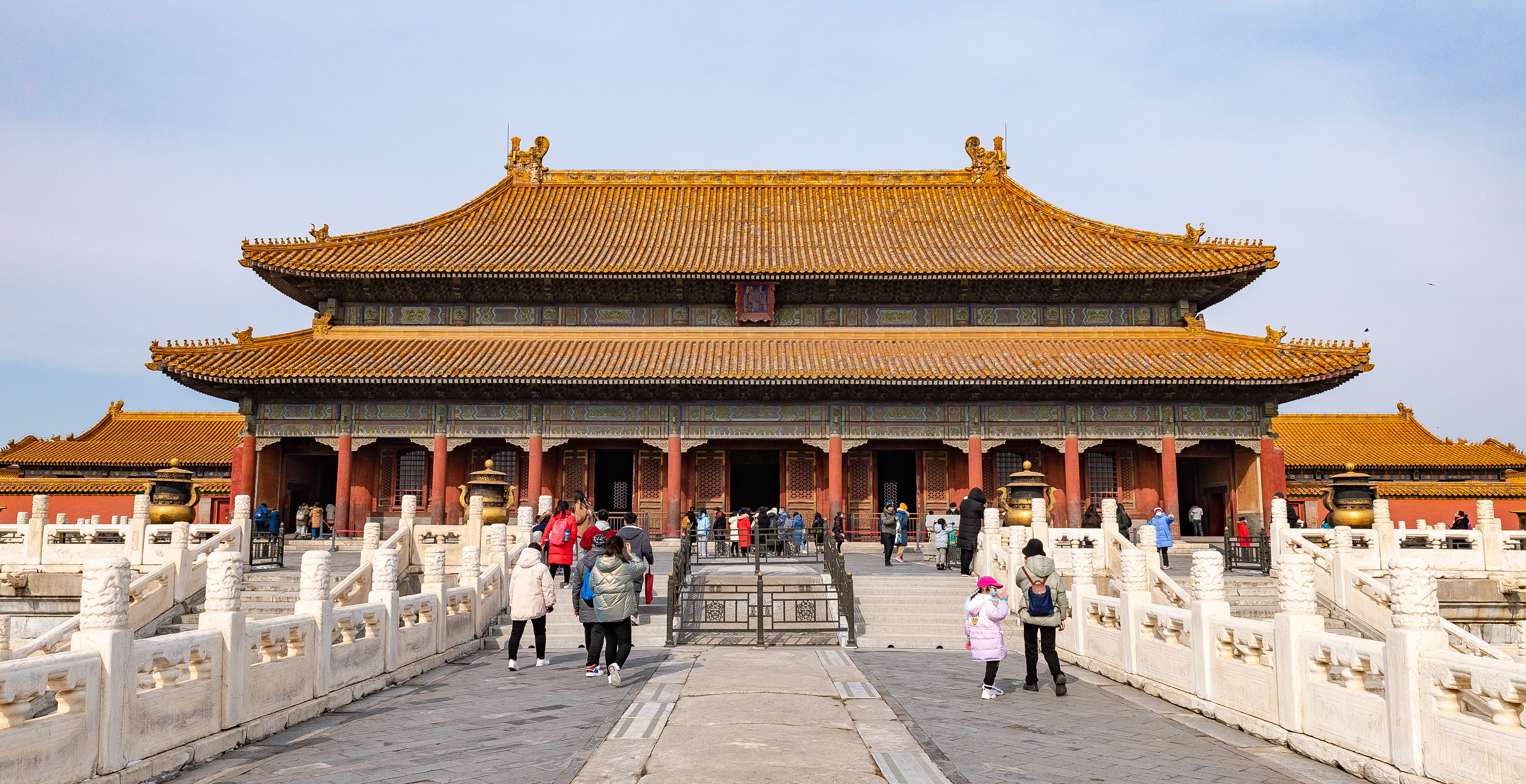
The Palace of Heavenly Purity in the Forbidden City

Departing from the main central administrative system generally known as the Three Departments and Six Ministries system, which was instituted by various dynasties since the late Han (202 BCE – 220 CE), the Ming administration had only one department, the Secretariat, that controlled the six ministries. Following the execution of the Chancellor Hu Weiyong in 1380, the Hongwu Emperor abolished the Secretariat, the Censorate, and the Chief Military Commission and personally took charge of the Six Ministries and the regional Five Military Commissions. Thus a whole level of administration was cut out and only partially rebuilt by subsequent rulers. The Grand Secretariat, at the beginning a secretarial institution that assisted the emperor with administrative paperwork, was instituted, but without employing grand counselors, or chancellors.

The Hongwu Emperor sent his heir apparent to Shaanxi in 1391 to 'tour and soothe' (xunfu) the region; in 1421 the Yongle Emperor commissioned 26 officials to travel the empire and uphold similar investigatory and patrimonial duties. By 1430 these xunfu assignments became institutionalized as "grand coordinators". Hence, the Censorate was reinstalled and first staffed with investigating censors, later with censors-in-chief. By 1453, the grand coordinators were granted the title vice censor-in-chief or assistant censor-in-chief and were allowed direct access to the emperor. As in prior dynasties, the provincial administrations were monitored by a travelling inspector from the Censorate. Censors had the power to impeach officials on an irregular basis, unlike the senior officials who were to do so only in triennial evaluations of junior officials.

Although decentralization of state power within the provinces occurred in the early Ming, the trend of central government officials delegated to the provinces as virtual provincial governors began in the 1420s. By the late Ming dynasty, there were central government officials delegated to two or more provinces as supreme commanders and viceroys, a system which reined in the power and influence of the military by the civil establishment.

==== Grand Secretariat and Six Ministries ====
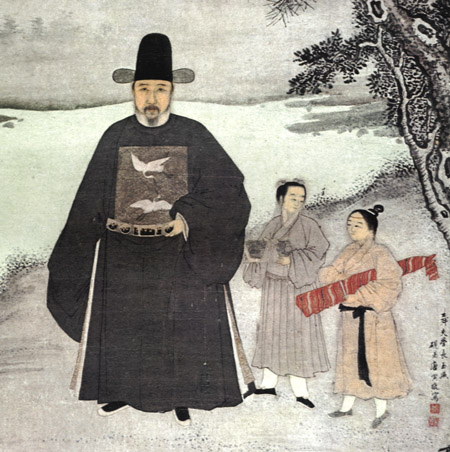
A portrait of Jiang Shunfu, an official under the Hongzhi Emperor, now in the Nanjing Museum. The decoration of two cranes on his chest is a "rank badge" that indicates he was a civil official of the first rank.

Governmental institutions in China conformed to a similar pattern for some two thousand years, but each dynasty installed special offices and bureaus, reflecting its own particular interests. The Ming administration utilized Grand Secretaries to assist the emperor, handling paperwork under the reign of the Yongle Emperor and later appointed as top officials of agencies and Grand Preceptor, a top-ranking, non-functional civil service post, under the Hongxi Emperor (r. 1424–1425). The Grand Secretariat drew its members from the Hanlin Academy and were considered part of the imperial authority, not the ministerial one (hence being at odds with both the emperor and ministers at times). The Secretariat operated as a coordinating agency, whereas the Six Ministries—Personnel, Revenue, Rites, War, Justice, and Public Works—were direct administrative organs of the state:

1. The Ministry of Personnel was in charge of appointments, merit ratings, promotions, and demotions of officials, as well as granting of honorific titles.
2. The Ministry of Revenue was in charge of gathering census data, collecting taxes, and handling state revenues, while there were two offices of currency that were subordinate to it.
3. The Ministry of Rites was in charge of state ceremonies, rituals, and sacrifices; it also oversaw registers for Buddhist and Daoist priesthoods and even the reception of envoys from tributary states.
4. The Ministry of War was in charge of the appointments, promotions, and demotions of military officers, the maintenance of military installations, equipment, and weapons, as well as the courier system.
5. The Ministry of Justice was in charge of judicial and penal processes, but had no supervisory role over the Censorate or the Grand Court of Revision.
6. The Ministry of Public Works had charge of government construction projects, hiring of artisans and laborers for temporary service, manufacturing government equipment, the maintenance of roads and canals, standardization of weights and measures, and the gathering of resources from the countryside.

==== Bureaus and offices for the imperial household ====
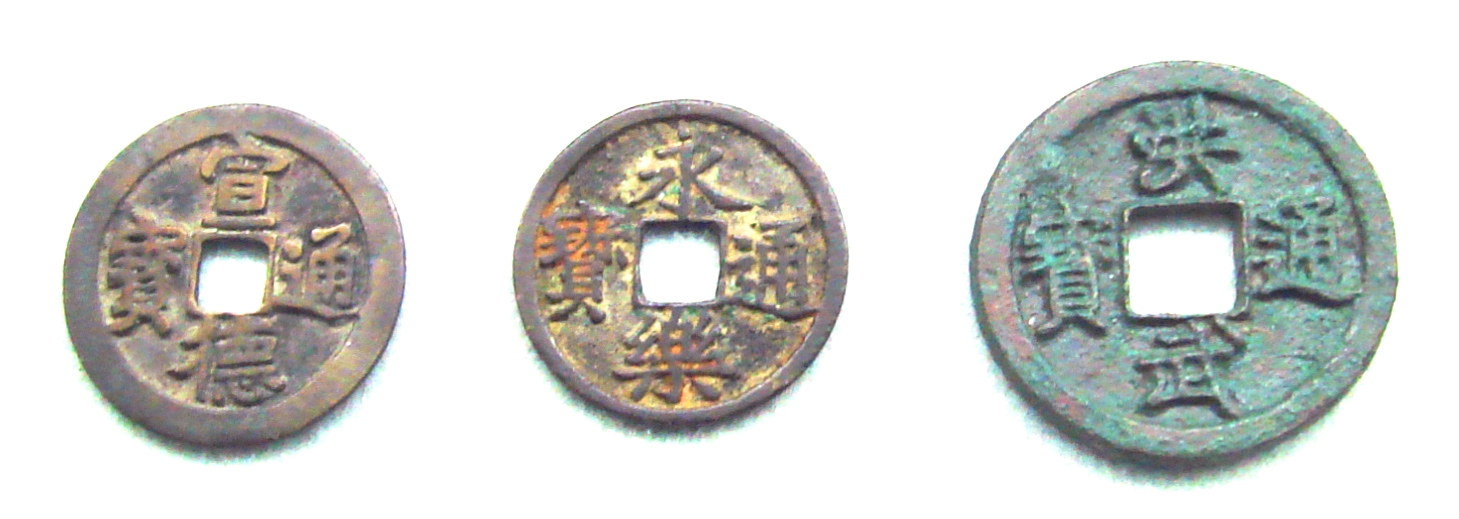
Ming coinage from the 14th–17th centuries

The imperial household was staffed almost entirely by eunuchs and ladies with their own bureaus. Female servants were organized into the Bureau of Palace Attendance, Bureau of Ceremonies, Bureau of Apparel, Bureau of Foodstuffs, Bureau of the Bedchamber, Bureau of Handicrafts, and Office of Staff Surveillance. Starting in the 1420s, eunuchs began taking over these ladies' positions until only the Bureau of Apparel with its four subsidiary offices remained. The Hongwu Emperor had his eunuchs organized into the Directorate of Palace Attendants, but as eunuch power at court increased, so did their administrative offices, with eventual twelve directorates, four offices, and eight bureaus. The dynasty had a vast imperial household, staffed with thousands of eunuchs, who were headed by the Directorate of Palace Attendants. The eunuchs were divided into different directorates in charge of staff surveillance, ceremonial rites, food, utensils, documents, stables, seals, apparel, and so on. The offices were in charge of providing fuel, music, paper, and baths. The bureaus were in charge of weapons, silverwork, laundering, headgear, bronze work, textile manufacture, wineries, and gardens. At times, the most influential eunuch in the Directorate of Ceremonial acted as de facto dictator over the state.

Although the imperial household was staffed mostly by eunuchs and palace ladies, there was a civil service office called the Seal Office, which cooperated with eunuch agencies in maintaining imperial seals, tallies, and stamps. There were also civil service offices to oversee the affairs of imperial princes.

=== Personnel ===
==== Scholar-officials ====
The Hongwu Emperor from 1373 to 1384 staffed his bureaus with officials gathered through recommendations only. After that the scholar-officials who populated the many ranks of bureaucracy were recruited through a rigorous examination system that was initially established by the Sui dynasty (581–618). Theoretically the system of exams allowed anyone to join the ranks of imperial officials (although it was frowned upon for merchants to join); in reality the time and funding needed to support the study in preparation for the exam generally limited participants to those already coming from the landholding class. However, the government did exact provincial quotas while drafting officials. This was an effort to curb monopolization of power by landholding gentry who came from the most prosperous regions, where education was the most advanced. The expansion of the printing industry since Song times enhanced the spread of knowledge and number of potential exam candidates throughout the provinces. For young schoolchildren there were printed multiplication tables and primers for elementary vocabulary; for adult examination candidates there were mass-produced, inexpensive volumes of Confucian classics and successful examination answers.

Candidates who had taken the civil service examinations would crowd around the wall where the results were posted; detail from a handscroll in ink and color on silk, by Qiu Ying (1494–1552).

As in earlier periods, the focus of the examination was classical Confucian texts, while the bulk of test material centered on the Four Books outlined by Zhu Xi in the 12th century. Ming era examinations were perhaps more difficult to pass since the 1487 requirement of completing the "eight-legged essay", a departure from basing essays off progressing literary trends. The exams increased in difficulty as the student progressed from the local level, and appropriate titles were accordingly awarded successful applicants. Officials were classified in nine hierarchic grades, each grade divided into two degrees, with ranging salaries (nominally paid in piculs of rice) according to their rank. While provincial graduates who were appointed to office were immediately assigned to low-ranking posts like the county graduates, those who passed the palace examination were awarded a jinshi ('presented scholar') degree and assured a high-level position. In 276 years of Ming rule and ninety palace examinations, the number of doctoral degrees granted by passing the palace examinations was 24,874. Ebrey states that "there were only two to four thousand of these jinshi at any given time, on the order of one out of 10,000 adult males." This was in comparison to the 100,000 shengyuan ('government students'), the lowest tier of graduates, by the 16th century.

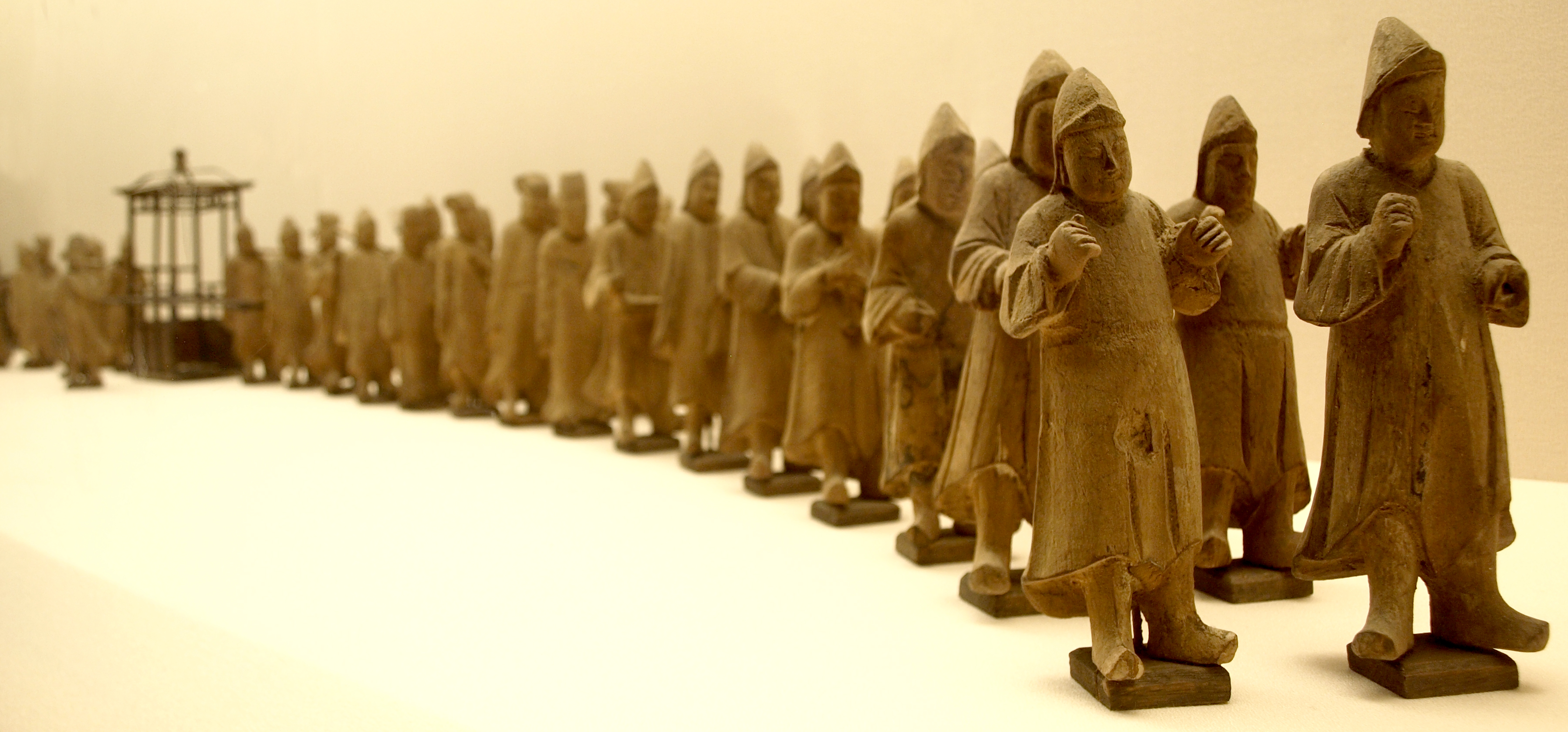
Processional figurines from the Shanghai tomb of Pan Yongzheng, a Ming dynasty official who lived during the 16th century

The maximum tenure in office was nine years, but every three years officials were graded on their performance by senior officials. If they were graded as superior then they were promoted, if graded adequate then they retained their ranks, and if graded inadequate they were demoted one rank. In extreme cases, officials would be dismissed or punished. Only capital officials of grade 4 and above were exempt from the scrutiny of recorded evaluation, although they were expected to confess any of their faults. There were over 4,000 school instructors in county and prefectural schools who were subject to evaluations every nine years. The Chief Instructor on the prefectural level was classified as equal to a second-grade county graduate. The Supervisorate of Imperial Instruction oversaw the education of the heir apparent to the throne; this office was headed by a Grand Supervisor of Instruction, who was ranked as first class of grade three.

Historians debate whether the examination system expanded or contracted upward social mobility. On the one hand, the exams were graded without regard to a candidate's social background, and were theoretically open to everyone. (Note: For the argument that they increased social mobility see Ho (1962).) In actual practice, the successful candidates had years of a very expensive, sophisticated tutoring of the sort that wealthy gentry families specialized in providing their talented sons. In practice, 90 percent of the population was ineligible due to lack of education, but the upper 10 percent had equal chances for moving to the top. To be successful young men had to have extensive, expensive training in classical Chinese, the use of Mandarin in spoken conversation, calligraphy, and had to master the intricate poetic requirements of the eight-legged essay. Not only did the traditional gentry dominate the system, they also learned that conservatism and resistance to new ideas was the path to success. For centuries critics had pointed out these problems, but the examination system only became more abstract and less relevant to the needs of China. The consensus of scholars is that the eight-legged essay can be blamed as a major cause of "China's cultural stagnation and economic backwardness." However Benjamin Ellman argues there were some positive features, since the essay form was capable of fostering "abstract thinking, persuasiveness, and prosodic form" and that its elaborate structure discouraged a wandering, unfocused narrative".

==== Lesser functionaries ====
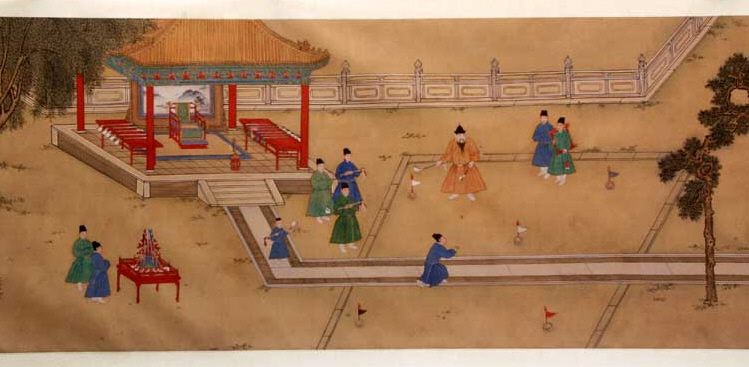
The Xuande Emperor playing chuiwan with his eunuchs, a game similar to golf, by an anonymous court painter of the Xuande period (1425–1435)

Scholar-officials who entered civil service through examinations acted as executive officials to a much larger body of non-ranked personnel called lesser functionaries. They outnumbered officials by four to one; Charles Hucker estimates that they were perhaps as many as 100,000 throughout the empire. These lesser functionaries performed clerical and technical tasks for government agencies. Yet they should not be confused with lowly lictors, runners, and bearers; lesser functionaries were given periodic merit evaluations like officials and after nine years of service might be accepted into a low civil service rank. The one great advantage of the lesser functionaries over officials was that officials were periodically rotated and assigned to different regional posts and had to rely on the good service and cooperation of the local lesser functionaries.

==== Eunuchs, princes, and generals ====
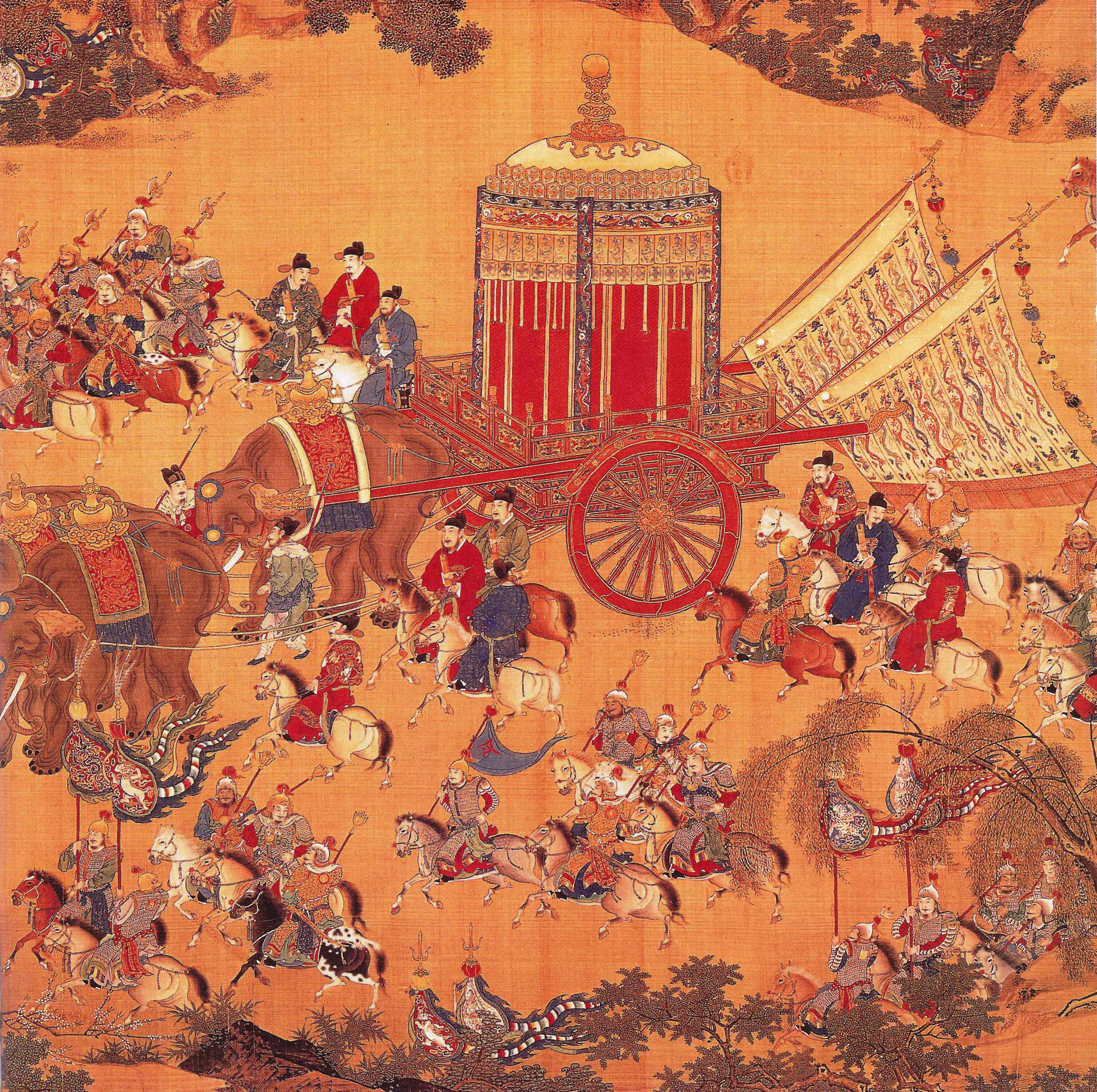
Detail of The Emperor's Approach showing the Wanli Emperor's royal carriage being pulled by elephants and escorted by cavalry

Eunuchs gained unprecedented power over state affairs during the Ming dynasty. One of the most effective means of control was the secret service stationed in what was called the Eastern Depot at the beginning of the dynasty, later the Western Depot. This secret service was overseen by the Directorate of Ceremonial, hence this state organ's often totalitarian affiliation. Eunuchs had ranks that were equivalent to civil service ranks, only theirs had four grades instead of nine.

Descendants of the first Ming emperor were made princes and given (typically nominal) military commands, annual stipends, and large estates. The title used was "king" (王, wáng) but—unlike the princes in the Han and Jin dynasties—these estates were not feudatories, the princes did not serve any administrative function, and they partook in military affairs only during the reigns of the first two emperors. The rebellion of the Prince of Yan was justified in part as upholding the rights of the princes, but once the Yongle Emperor was enthroned, he continued his nephew's policy of disarming his brothers and moved their fiefs away from the militarized northern border. Although princes served no organ of state administration, the princes, consorts of the imperial princesses, and ennobled relatives did staff the Imperial Clan Court, which supervised the imperial genealogy.

Like scholar-officials, military generals were ranked in a hierarchic grading system and were given merit evaluations every five years (as opposed to three years for officials). However, military officers had less prestige than officials. This was due to their hereditary service (instead of solely merit-based) and Confucian values that dictated those who chose the profession of violence (wu) over the cultured pursuits of knowledge (wen). Although seen as less prestigious, military officers were not excluded from taking civil service examinations, and after 1478 the military even held their own examinations to test military skills. In addition to taking over the established bureaucratic structure from the Yuan period, the Ming emperors established the new post of the travelling military inspector. In the early half of the dynasty, men of noble lineage dominated the higher ranks of military office; this trend was reversed during the latter half of the dynasty as men from more humble origins eventually displaced them.

== Society and culture ==
=== Literature and arts ===
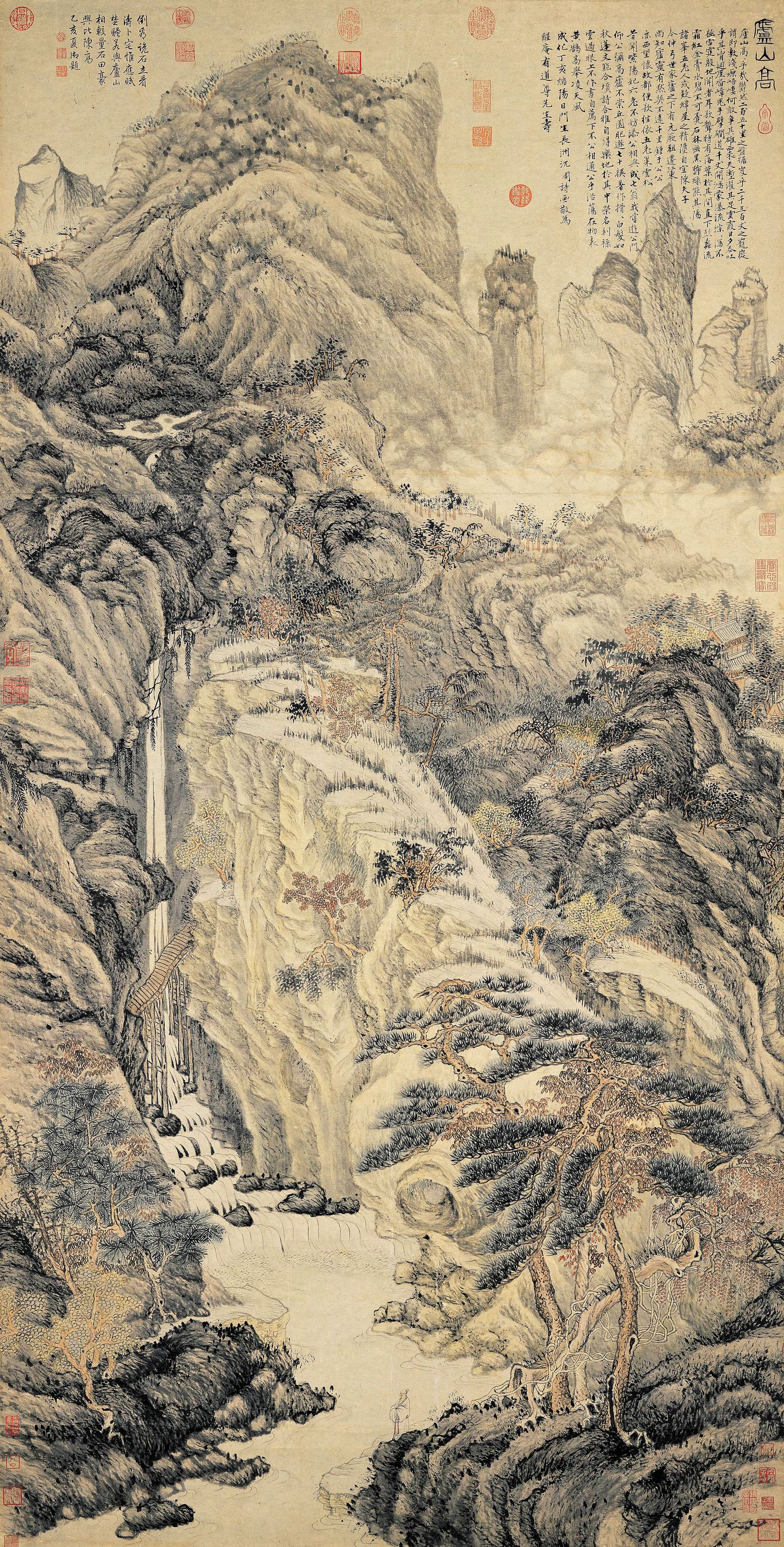
Lofty Mount Lu, by Shen Zhou, 1467

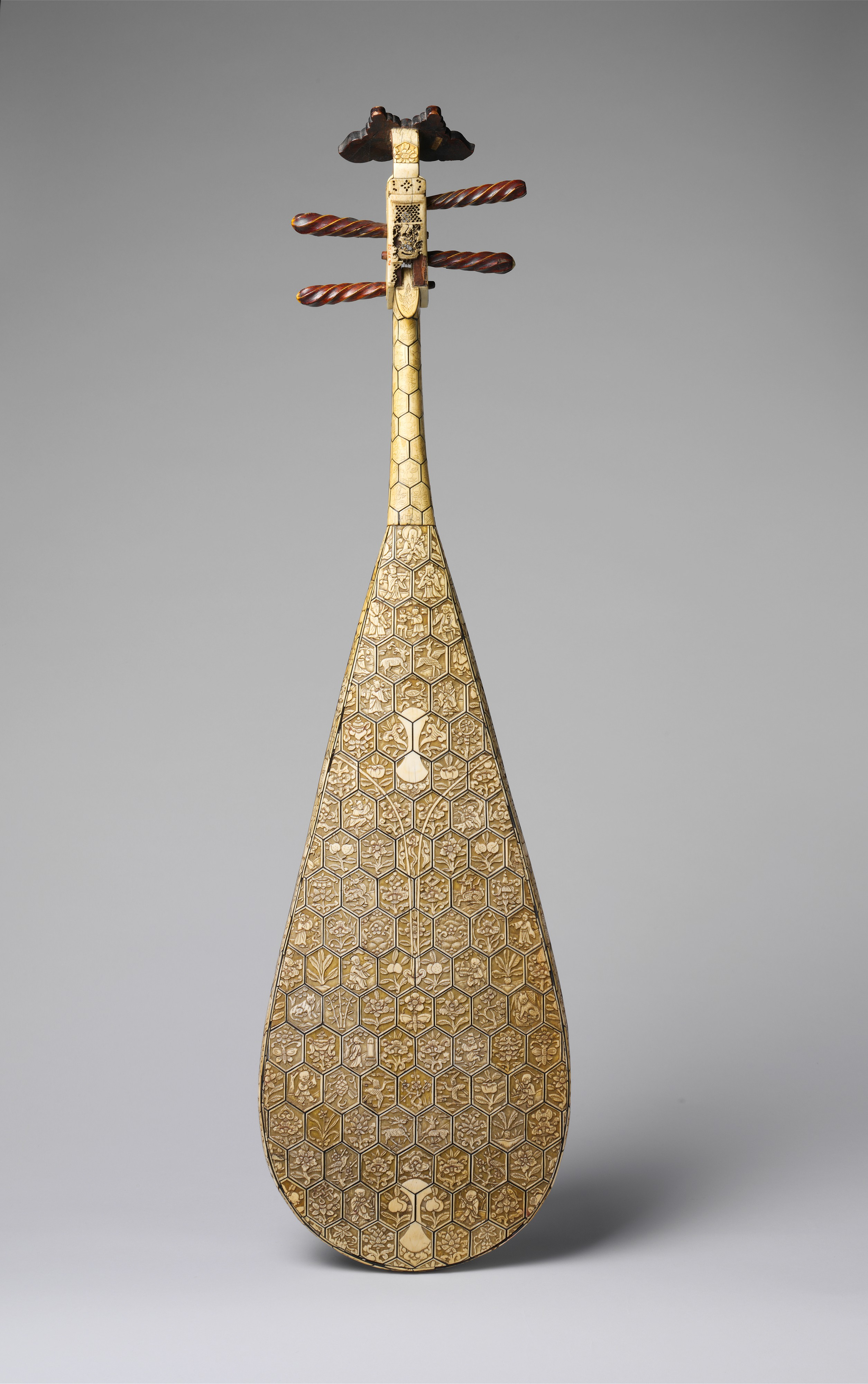
Decorated back of a pipa from the Ming dynasty

Literature, painting, poetry, music, and Chinese opera of various types flourished during the Ming dynasty, especially in the economically prosperous lower Yangzi valley. Although short fiction had been popular as far back as the Tang dynasty (618–907), and the works of contemporaneous authors such as Xu Guangqi, Xu Xiake, and Song Yingxing were often technical and encyclopedic, the most striking literary development was the vernacular novel. While the gentry elite were educated enough to fully comprehend the language of Classical Chinese, those with rudimentary education—such as women in educated families, merchants, and shop clerks—became a large potential audience for literature and performing arts that employed Vernacular Chinese. Literati scholars edited or developed major Chinese novels into mature form in this period, such as Water Margin and Journey to the West. Jin Ping Mei, published in 1610, although incorporating earlier material, marks the trend toward independent composition and concern with psychology. In the later years of the dynasty, Feng Menglong and Ling Mengchu innovated with vernacular short fiction. Theater scripts were equally imaginative. The most famous, The Peony Pavilion, was written by Tang Xianzu (1550–1616), with its first performance at the Pavilion of Prince Teng in 1598.

Informal essay and travel writing was another highlight. Xu Xiake (1587–1641), a travel literature author, published his Travel Diaries in 404,000 written characters, with information on everything from local geography to mineralogy. The first reference to the publishing of private newspapers in Beijing was in 1582; by 1638 the Peking Gazette switched from using woodblock print to movable type printing. The new literary field of the moral guide to business ethics was developed during the late Ming period, for the readership of the merchant class.

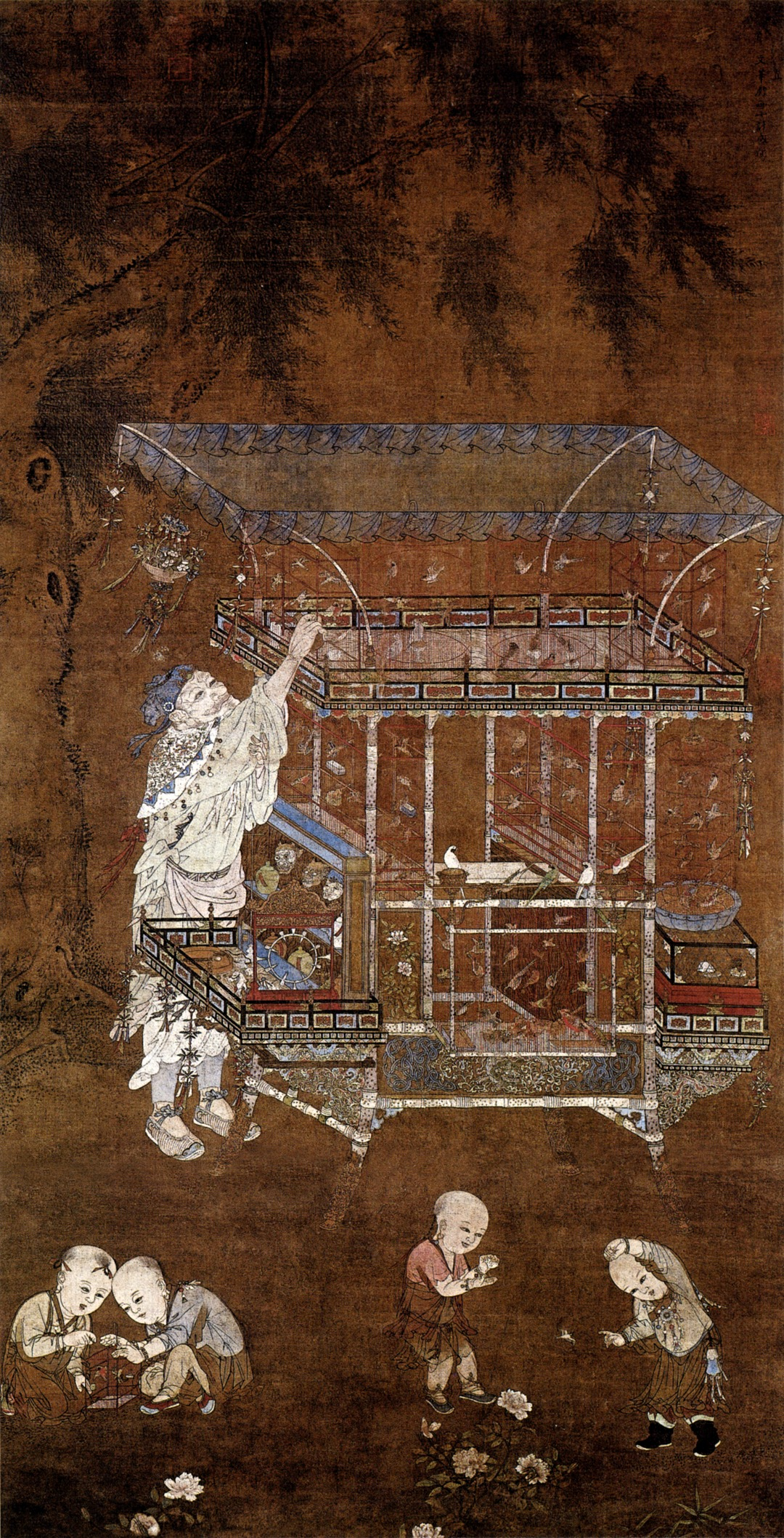
Painting of a peddler selling birds, by Ji Sheng (計盛), 15th century

In contrast to Xu Xiake, who focused on technical aspects in his travel literature, the Chinese poet and official Yuan Hongdao (1568–1610) used travel literature to express his desires for individualism as well as autonomy from and frustration with Confucian court politics. Yuan desired to free himself from the ethical compromises that were inseparable from the career of a scholar-official. This anti-official sentiment in Yuan's travel literature and poetry was actually following in the tradition of the Song dynasty poet and official Su Shi (1037–1101). Yuan Hongdao and his two brothers, Yuan Zongdao (1560–1600) and Yuan Zhongdao (1570–1623), were the founders of the Gong'an School of letters. This highly individualistic school of poetry and prose was criticized by the Confucian establishment for its association with intense sensual lyricism, which was also apparent in Ming vernacular novels such as the Jin Ping Mei. Yet even gentry and scholar-officials were affected by the new popular romantic literature, seeking gejis as soulmates to re-enact the heroic love stories that arranged marriages often could not provide or accommodate. During the Ming, some gentry dated well-educated gejis outside of marriage and the concubine system. Gējì culture reshaped the purely sexual relationship with prostitutes into a cultural relationship, and men could even become friends with like-minded gejis.

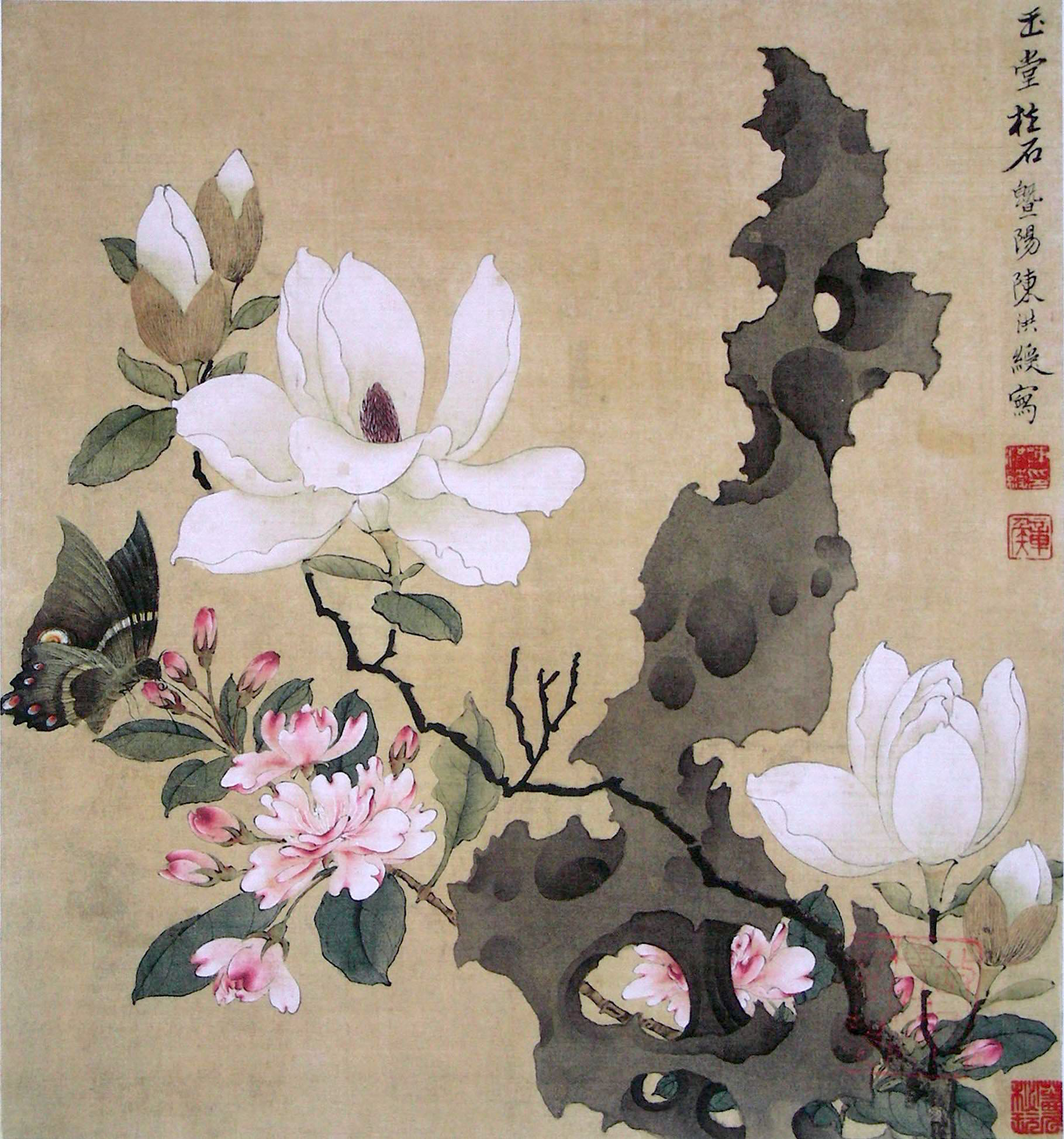
Painting of flowers, a butterfly, and rock sculpture by Chen Hongshou (1598–1652); small leaf album paintings like this one first became popular in the Song dynasty.

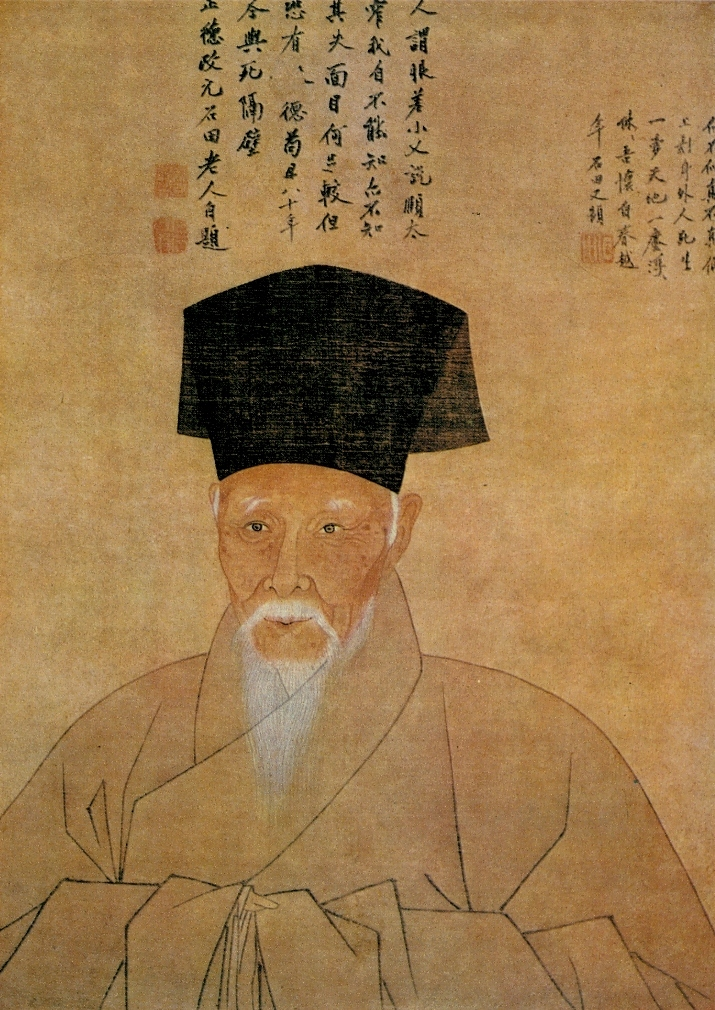
Shen Zhou (1427–1509) founded the Wu School of painting, contributing greatly to Chinese artistic tradition.

Famous painters included Ni Zan and Dong Qichang, as well as the Four Masters of the Ming dynasty, Shen Zhou, Tang Yin, Wen Zhengming, and Qiu Ying. They drew upon the techniques, styles, and complexity in painting achieved by their Song and Yuan predecessors, but added techniques and styles. Well-known Ming artists could make a living simply by painting due to the high prices they demanded for their artworks and the great demand by the highly cultured community to collect precious works of art. The artist Qiu Ying was once paid 2.8 kg (100 oz) of silver to paint a long handscroll for the eightieth birthday celebration of the mother of a wealthy patron. Renowned artists often gathered an entourage of followers, some who were amateurs who painted while pursuing an official career and others who were full-time painters.

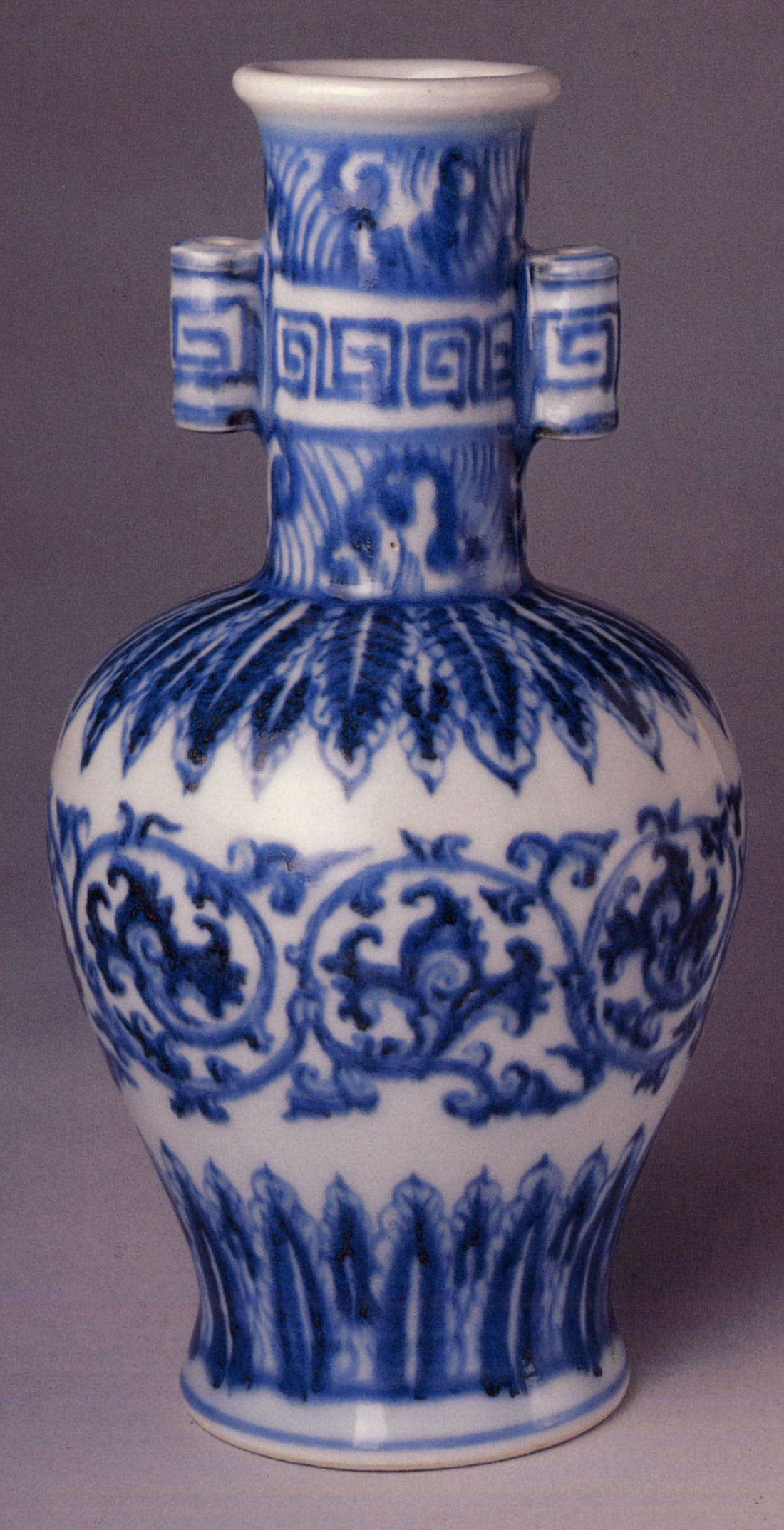
A Xuande period (1426–1435) imperial blue and white vase – Metropolitan Museum of Art, New York

The period was also renowned for ceramics and porcelains. The major production center for porcelain was the imperial kilns at Jingdezhen in Jiangxi, most famous in the period for blue and white porcelain, but also producing other styles. The Dehua porcelain factories in Fujian catered to European tastes by creating Chinese export porcelain by the late 16th century. Individual potters also became known, such as He Chaozong, who became famous in the early 17th century for his style of white porcelain sculpture. In The Ceramic Trade in Asia, Chuimei Ho estimates that about 16% of late Ming era Chinese ceramic exports were sent to Europe, while the rest were destined for Japan and South East Asia.

Carved designs in lacquerware and designs glazed onto porcelain wares displayed intricate scenes similar in complexity to those in painting. These items could be found in the homes of the wealthy, alongside embroidered silks and wares in jade, ivory, and cloisonné. The houses of the rich were also furnished with rosewood furniture and feathery latticework. The writing materials in a scholar's private study, including elaborately carved brush holders made of stone or wood, were designed and arranged ritually to give an aesthetic appeal.

Connoisseurship in the late Ming period centered on these items of refined artistic taste, which provided work for art dealers and even underground scammers who themselves made imitations and false attributions. The Jesuit Matteo Ricci while staying in Nanjing wrote that Chinese scam artists were ingenious at making forgeries and huge profits. However, there were guides to help the wary new connoisseur; Liu Tong (died 1637) wrote a book printed in 1635 that told his readers how to spot fake and authentic pieces of art. He revealed that a Xuande era (1426–1435) bronze work could be authenticated by judging its sheen; porcelain wares from the Yongle era (1402–1424) could be judged authentic by their thickness.

=== Religion ===
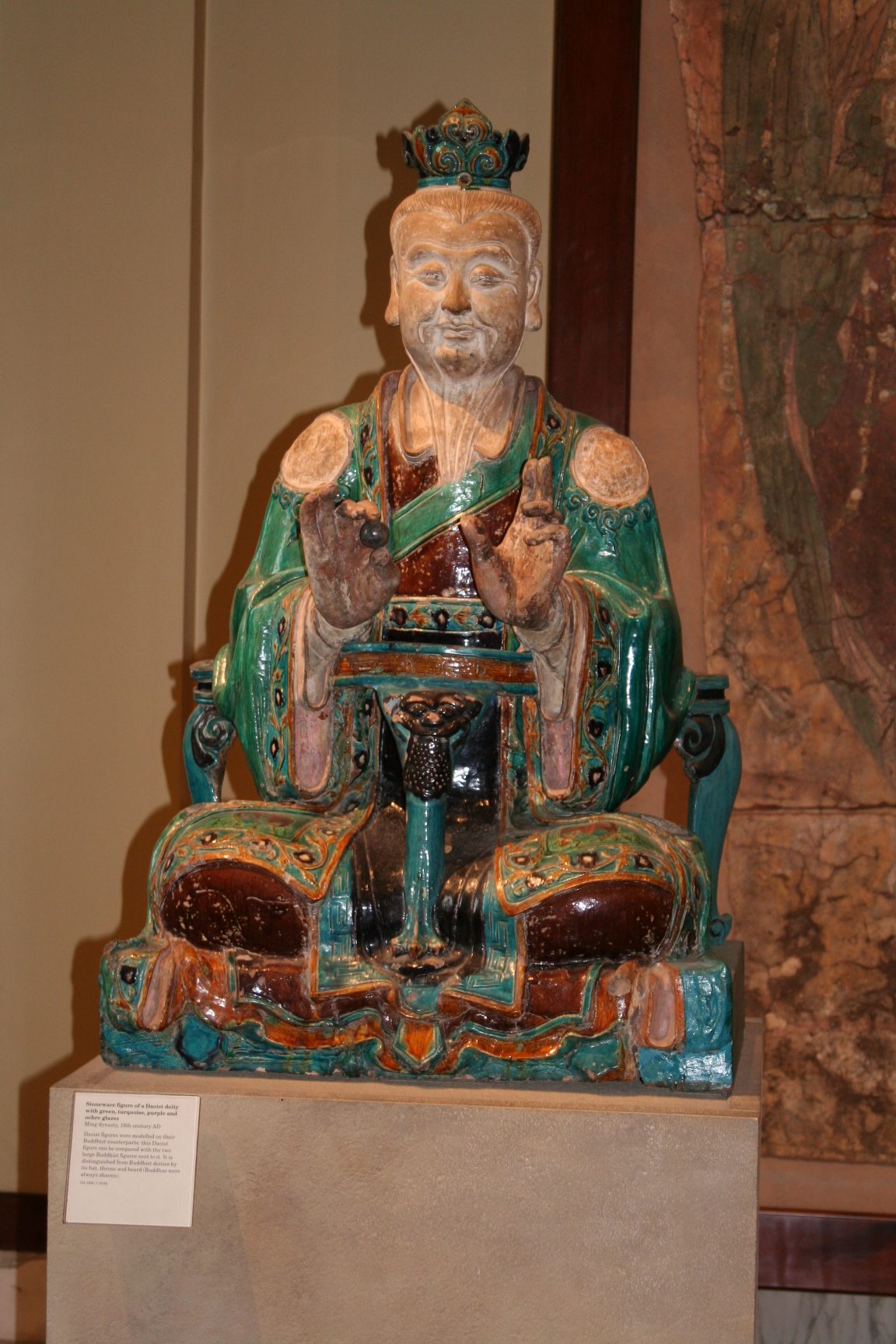
Glazed stoneware statue of a Taoist deity, 16th century

The dominant religious beliefs during the Ming dynasty were the various forms of Chinese folk religion and the Three Teachings—Confucianism, Taoism, and Buddhism. The Yuan-supported Tibetan lamas fell from favor, and the early Ming emperors particularly favored Taoism, granting its practitioners many positions in the state's ritual offices. The Hongwu Emperor curtailed the cosmopolitan culture of the Mongol Yuan dynasty, and the prolific Prince of Ning Zhu Quan even composed one encyclopedia attacking Buddhism as a foreign "mourning cult", deleterious to the state, and another encyclopedia that subsequently joined the Taoist canon.

Islam was also well established in China, with a history traditionally traced to Sa'd ibn Abi Waqqas during the Tang dynasty, and enjoying strong official support under the Yuan. Although this patronage was sharply curtailed under the Ming dynasty, several prominent Muslims remained influential in the early Ming period, most notably the powerful eunuch Zheng He. Some Hui scholars have identified several generals of the Hongwu Emperor—including Chang Yuchun, Lan Yu, Ding Dexing, and Mu Ying—as Muslims; however, these claims are disputed by non-Muslim sources.

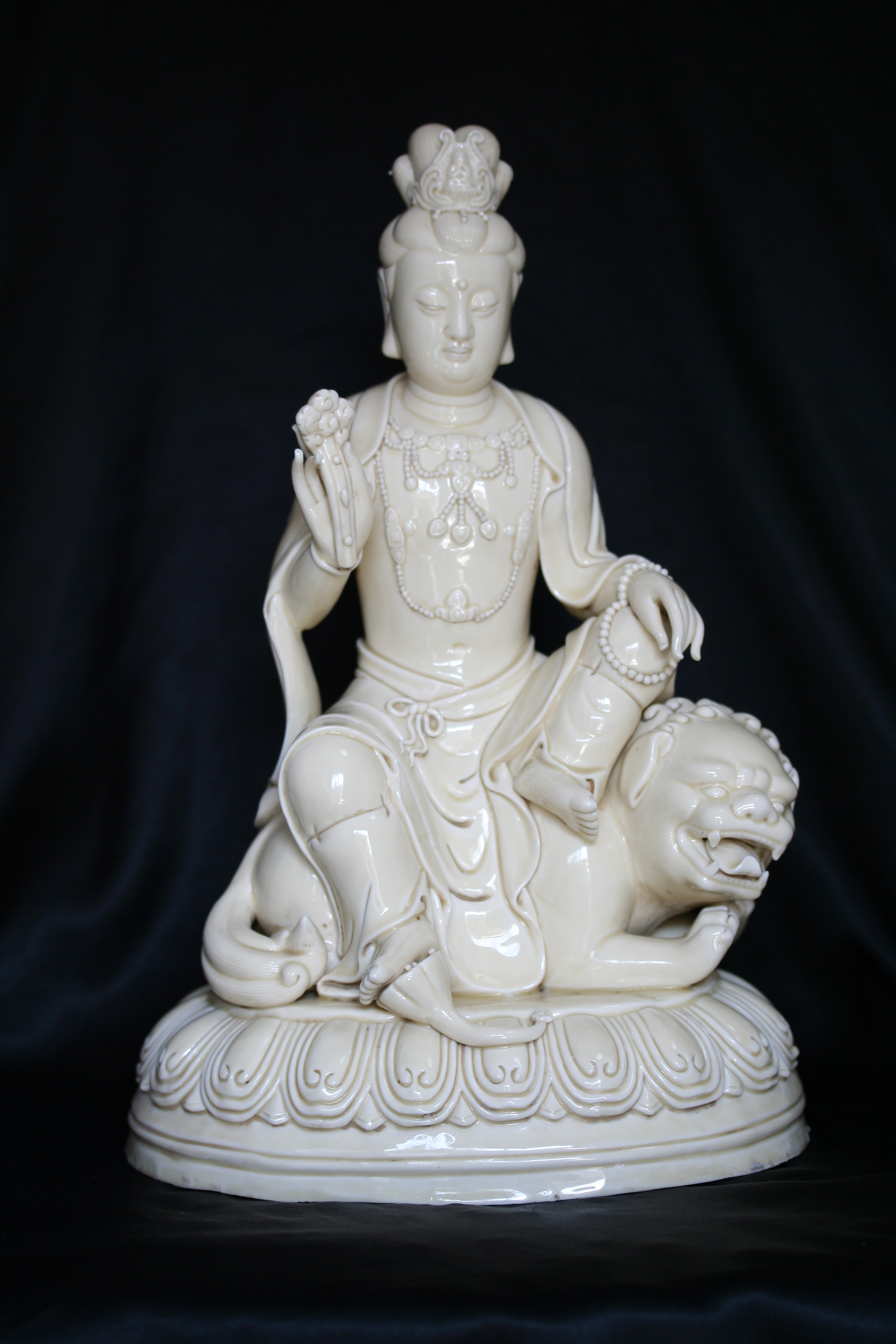
Bodhisattva Manjusri in Blanc-de-Chine, by He Chaozong, 17th century

The establishment of the Ming dynasty was initially devastating to Christianity. In his first year of rule, the Hongwu Emperor declared the eighty-year-old Franciscan missions established under the Yuan dynasty heterodox and illegal. The centuries-old Church of the East in China also disappeared. During the later Ming, a new wave of Christian missionaries arrived—particularly Jesuits—who employed new western science and technology in their arguments for conversion. They were educated in Chinese language and culture at St. Paul's College, Macau after its founding in 1579. The most influential was Matteo Ricci, whose "Map of the Myriad Countries of the World" upended traditional geography throughout East Asia, and whose work with the convert Xu Guangqi led to the first Chinese translation of Euclid's Elements in 1607. The discovery of the Xi'an Stele in 1625 also facilitated the treatment of Christianity as a long-established faith in China rather than as a new and dangerous cult. Strong disagreements arose over the extent to which converts could continue to perform rituals honoring the emperor, Confucius, or their ancestors. Matteo Ricci had adopted a highly accommodating approach, and attempts by his successors to retreat from this policy led to the Nanjing incident of 1616, which resulted in the exile of four Jesuits to Macau and the exclusion of the remaining missionaries from public life for six years.

During his mission, Ricci was also contacted in Beijing by one of the approximately 5,000 Kaifeng Jews and introduced them and their long history in China to Europe. The 1642 flood caused by Kaifeng's Ming governor devastated the community, which lost five of its twelve families, its synagogue, and most of its Torah.

=== Philosophy ===
==== Wang Yangming's Confucianism ====
Portrait of Wang Yangming (1472–1529), considered the most influential Confucian thinker since Zhu Xi

During the Ming dynasty, the Neo-Confucian doctrines of the Song scholar Zhu Xi were embraced by the court and the Chinese literati at large, although the direct line of his school was destroyed by the Yongle Emperor's extermination of the ten degrees of kinship of Fang Xiaoru in 1402. The Ming scholar most influential upon subsequent generations, however, was Wang Yangming, whose teachings were attacked in his own time for their similarity to Chan Buddhism. Building upon Zhu Xi's concept of the "extension of knowledge" (理學 or 格物致知), gaining understanding through careful and rational investigation of things and events, Wang argued that universal concepts would appear in the minds of anyone. Therefore, he claimed that anyone—no matter their pedigree or education—could become as wise as Confucius and Mencius had been and that their writings were not sources of truth but merely guides that might have flaws when carefully examined. A peasant with a great deal of experience and intelligence would then be wiser than an official who had memorized the Classics but not experienced the real world.

==== Conservative reaction ====
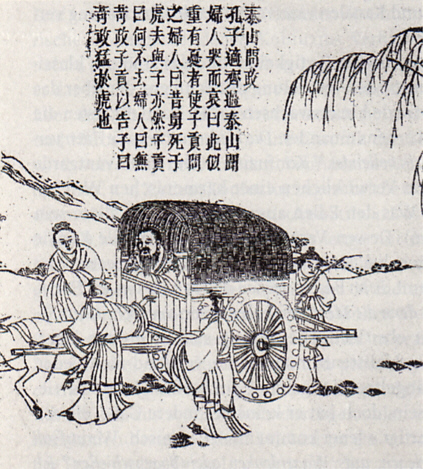
A Ming dynasty print drawing of Confucius on his way to the Zhou dynasty capital of Luoyang

Other scholar-bureaucrats were wary of Wang's heterodoxy, the increasing number of his disciples while he was still in office, and his overall socially rebellious message. To curb his influence, he was often sent out to deal with military affairs and rebellions far away from the capital. Yet his ideas penetrated mainstream Chinese thought and spurred new interest in Taoism and Buddhism. Furthermore, people began to question the validity of the social hierarchy and the idea that the scholar should be above the farmer. Wang Yangming's disciple and salt-mine worker Wang Gen gave lectures to commoners about pursuing education to improve their lives, while his follower He Xinyin challenged the elevation and emphasis of the family in Chinese society. His contemporary Li Zhi even taught that women were the intellectual equals of men and should be given a better education; both Li and He eventually died in prison, jailed on charges of spreading "dangerous ideas". Yet these "dangerous ideas" of educating women had long been embraced by some mothers and by courtesans who were as literate and skillful in calligraphy, painting, and poetry as their male guests.

The liberal views of Wang Yangming were opposed by the Censorate and by the Donglin Academy, re-established in 1604. These conservatives wanted a revival of orthodox Confucian ethics. Conservatives such as Gu Xiancheng (1550–1612) argued against Wang's idea of innate moral knowledge, stating that this was simply a legitimization for unscrupulous behavior such as greedy pursuits and personal gain. These two strands of Confucian thought, hardened by Chinese scholars' notions of obligation towards their mentors, developed into pervasive factionalism among the ministers of state, who used any opportunity to impeach members of the other faction from court.

=== Urban and rural life ===
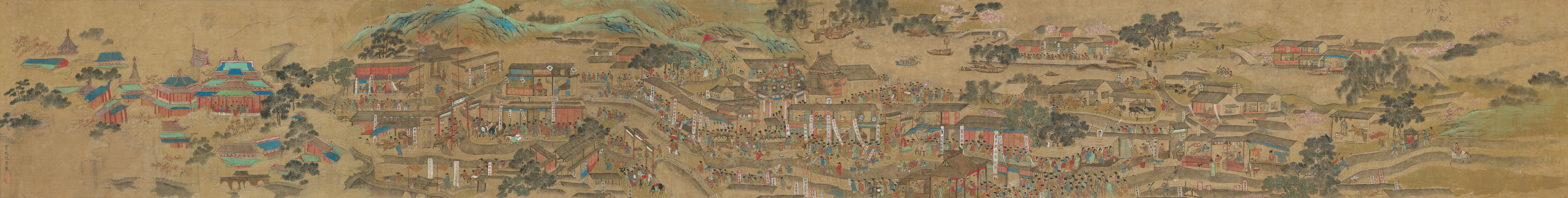
The Bustling and Hustling of Nanjing—handscroll by Qiu Ying, depicting the urban life of Nanjing
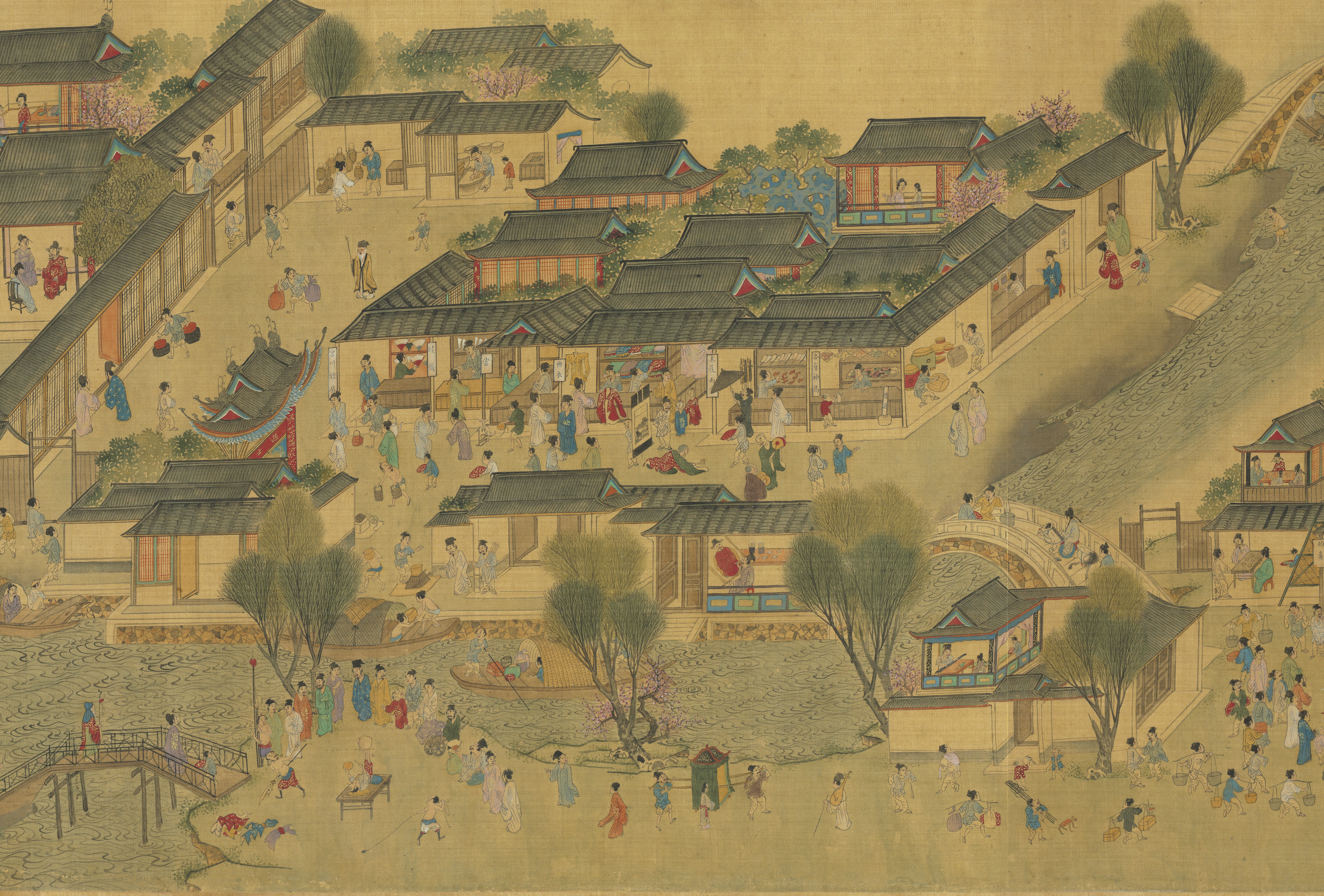
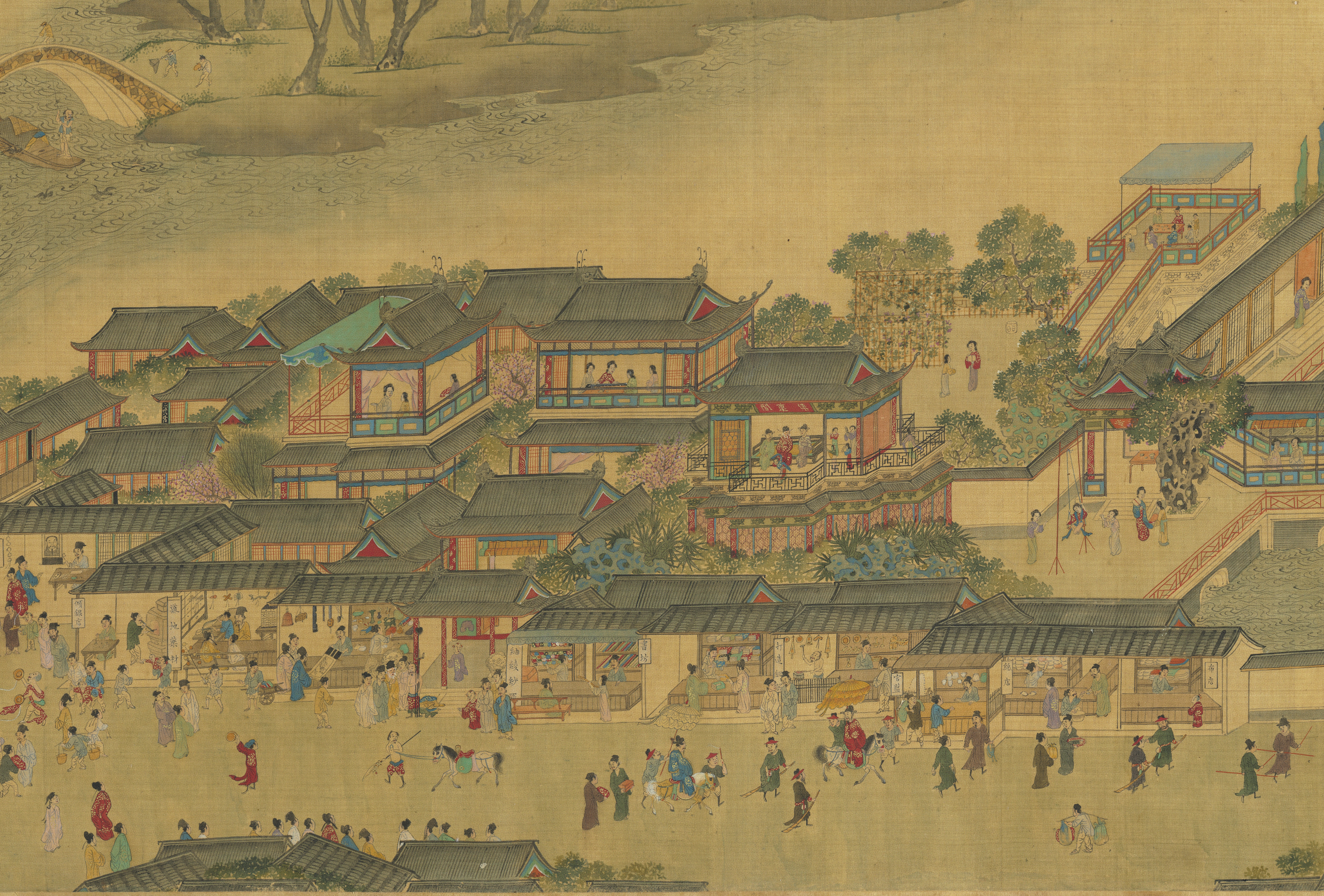
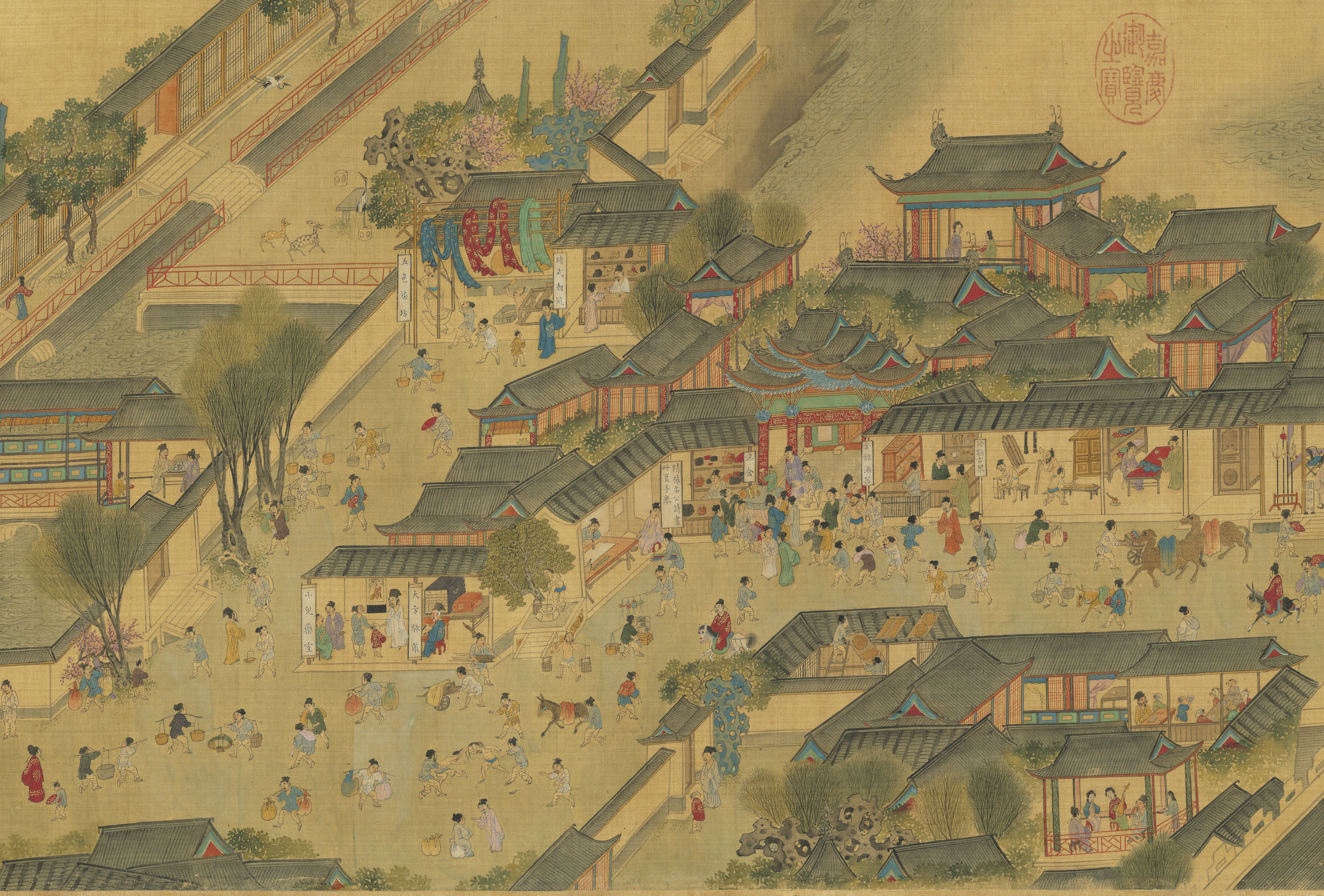
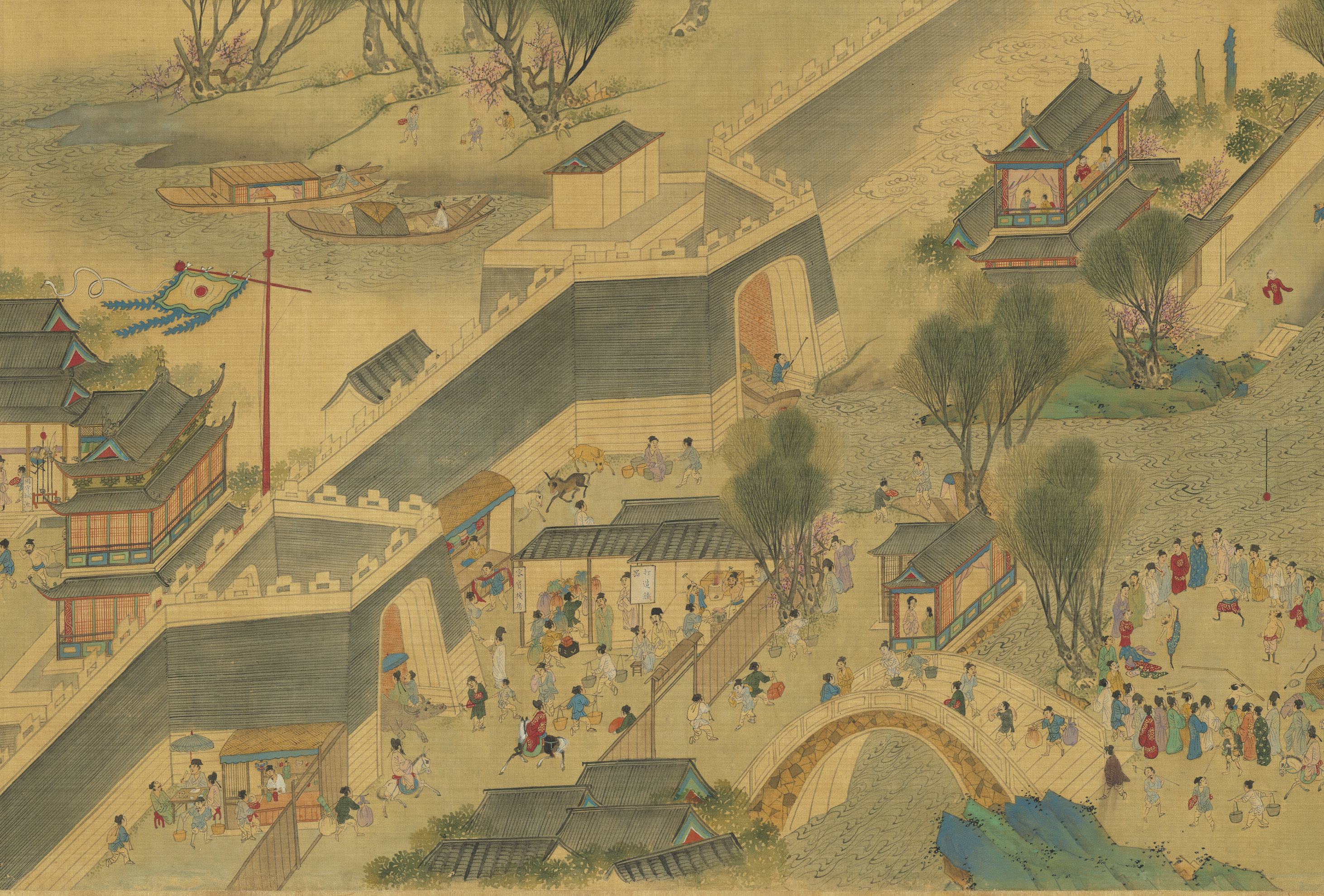
"Suzhou Imitation" of Along the River During the Qingming Festival (蘇州片清明上河圖), depicting urban life of the Ming dynasty.

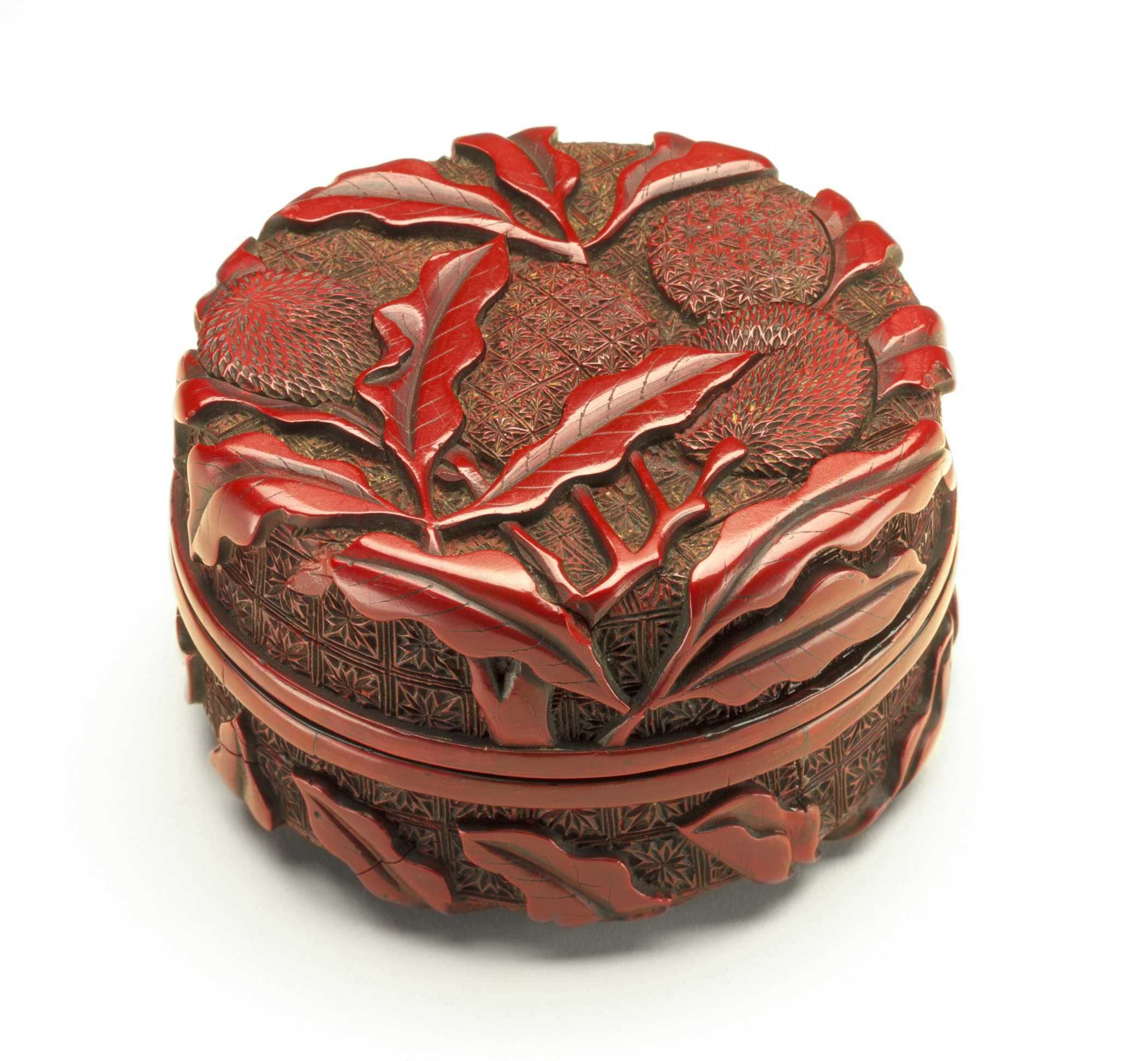
A Ming dynasty red "seal paste box" in carved lacquer

Wang Gen was able to give philosophical lectures to many commoners from different regions because—following the trend already apparent in the Song dynasty—communities in Ming society were becoming less isolated as the distance between market towns was shrinking. Schools, descent groups, religious associations, and other local voluntary organizations were increasing in number and allowing more contact between educated men and local villagers. Jonathan Spence writes that the distinction between what was town and country was blurred, since suburban areas with farms were located just outside and in some cases within the walls of a city. Not only was the blurring of town and country evident, but also of socioeconomic class in the traditional four occupations, since artisans sometimes worked on farms in peak periods, and farmers often traveled into the city to find work during times of dearth.

A variety of occupations could be chosen or inherited from a father's line of work. These included coffin makers, ironworkers and blacksmiths, tailors, cooks and noodle-makers, retail merchants, tavern, teahouse, or winehouse managers, shoemakers, seal cutters, pawnshop owners, brothel heads, and merchant bankers engaging in a proto-banking system involving notes of exchange. Virtually every town had a brothel where female and male prostitutes could be had. Male catamites fetched a higher price than female concubines since pederasty with a teenage boy was seen as a mark of elite status, regardless of sodomy being repugnant to sexual norms. Public bathing became much more common than in earlier periods. Urban shops and retailers sold a variety of goods such as special paper money to burn at ancestral sacrifices, specialized luxury goods, headgear, fine cloth, teas, and others. Smaller communities and townships too poor or scattered to support shops and artisans obtained their goods from periodic market fairs and traveling peddlers. A small township also provided a place for simple schooling, news and gossip, matchmaking, religious festivals, traveling theater groups, tax collection, and bases of famine relief distribution.

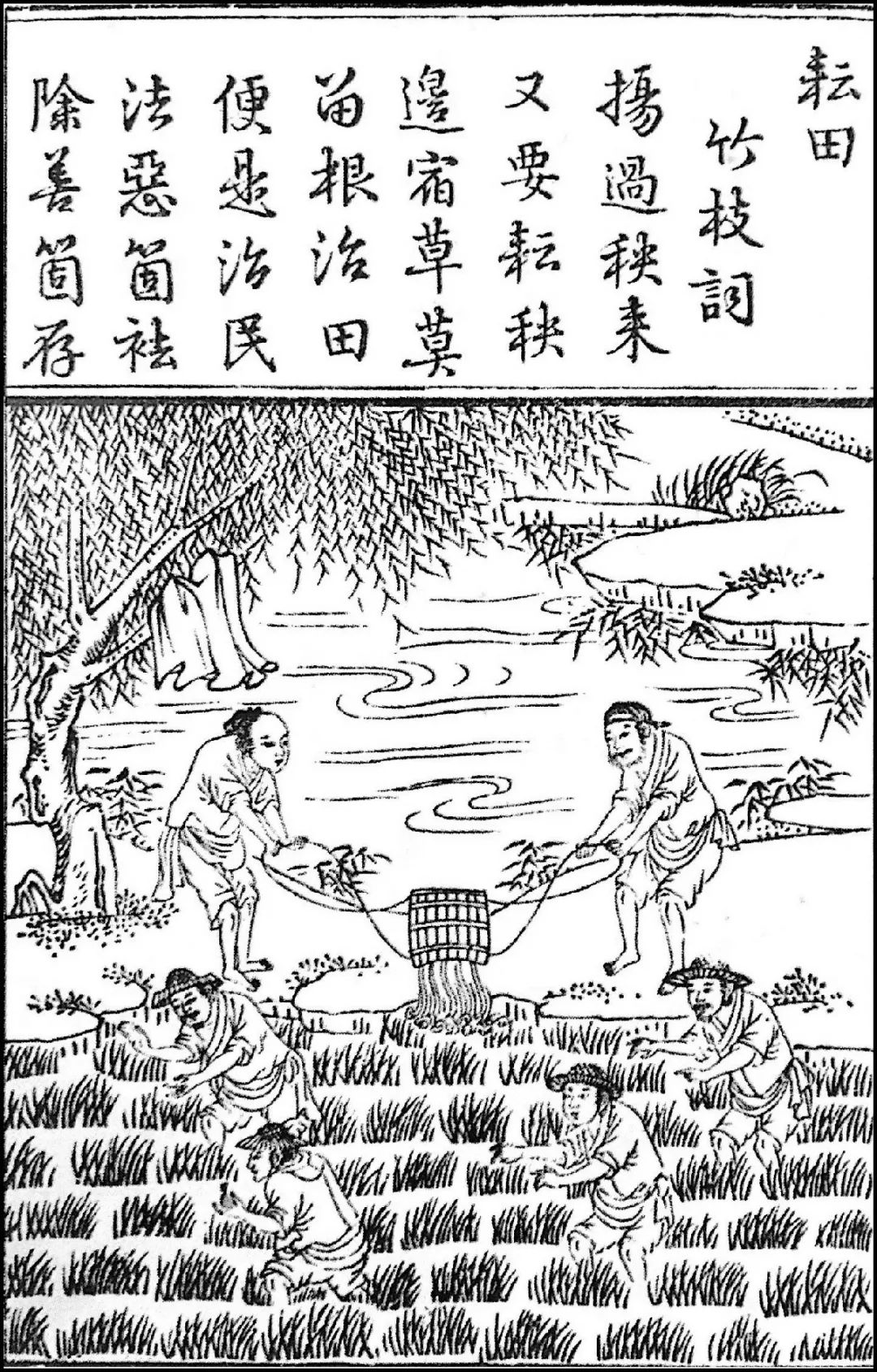
Weeding out the field, illustrated on Fan Kuang's Bianmintuzuan (便民图纂)

Farming villagers in the north spent their days harvesting crops like wheat and millet, while farmers south of the Huai River engaged in intensive rice cultivation and had lakes and ponds where ducks and fish could be raised. The cultivation of mulberry trees for silkworms and tea bushes could be found mostly south of the Yangtze; even further south sugarcane and citrus were grown as basic crops. Some people in the mountainous southwest made a living by selling lumber from hard bamboo. Besides cutting down trees to sell wood, the poor also made a living by turning wood into charcoal, and by burning oyster shells to make lime and fired pots, and weaving mats and baskets. In the north traveling by horse and carriage was most common, while in the south the myriad of rivers, canals, and lakes provided cheap and easy water transport. Although the south had the characteristic of the wealthy landlord and tenant farmers, there were on average many more owner-cultivators north of the Huai River due to harsher climate, living not far above subsistence level.

Early Ming dynasty saw the strictest sumptuary laws in Chinese history. It was illegal for commoners to wear fine silk or dress in bright red, dark green or yellow colors; nor could they wear boots or guan hats. Women could not use ornaments made from gold, jade, pearl or emerald. Merchants and their families were further banned from using silk. However, these laws were no longer enforced from the mid-Ming period onwards.

Male homosexual marriages were institutionalized in several areas, such as Fujian. Homosexuality was practiced frequently by monks, and spread to Japan with Kukai, a Japanese monk who trained in China.

== Science and technology ==
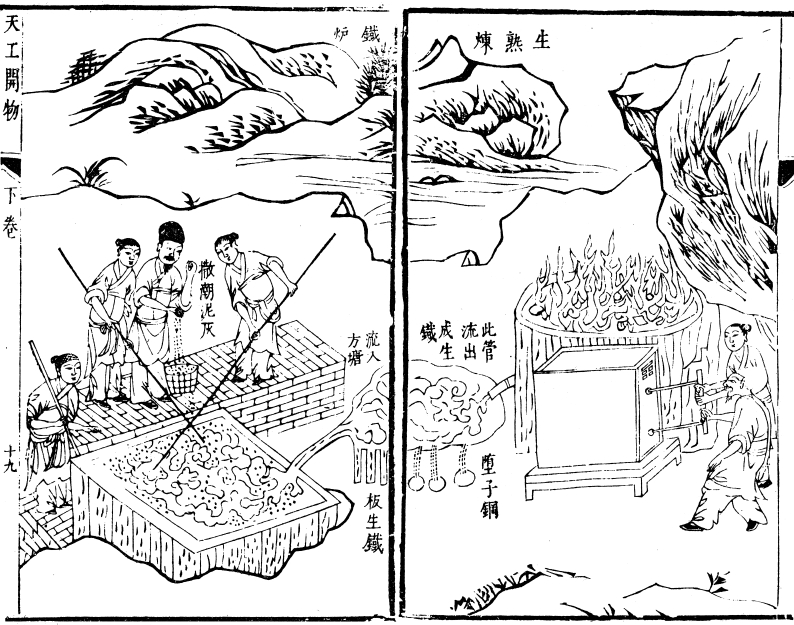
The puddling process of smelting iron ore to make pig iron and then wrought iron, with the right illustration displaying men working a blast furnace, from the Tiangong Kaiwu encyclopedia, 1637

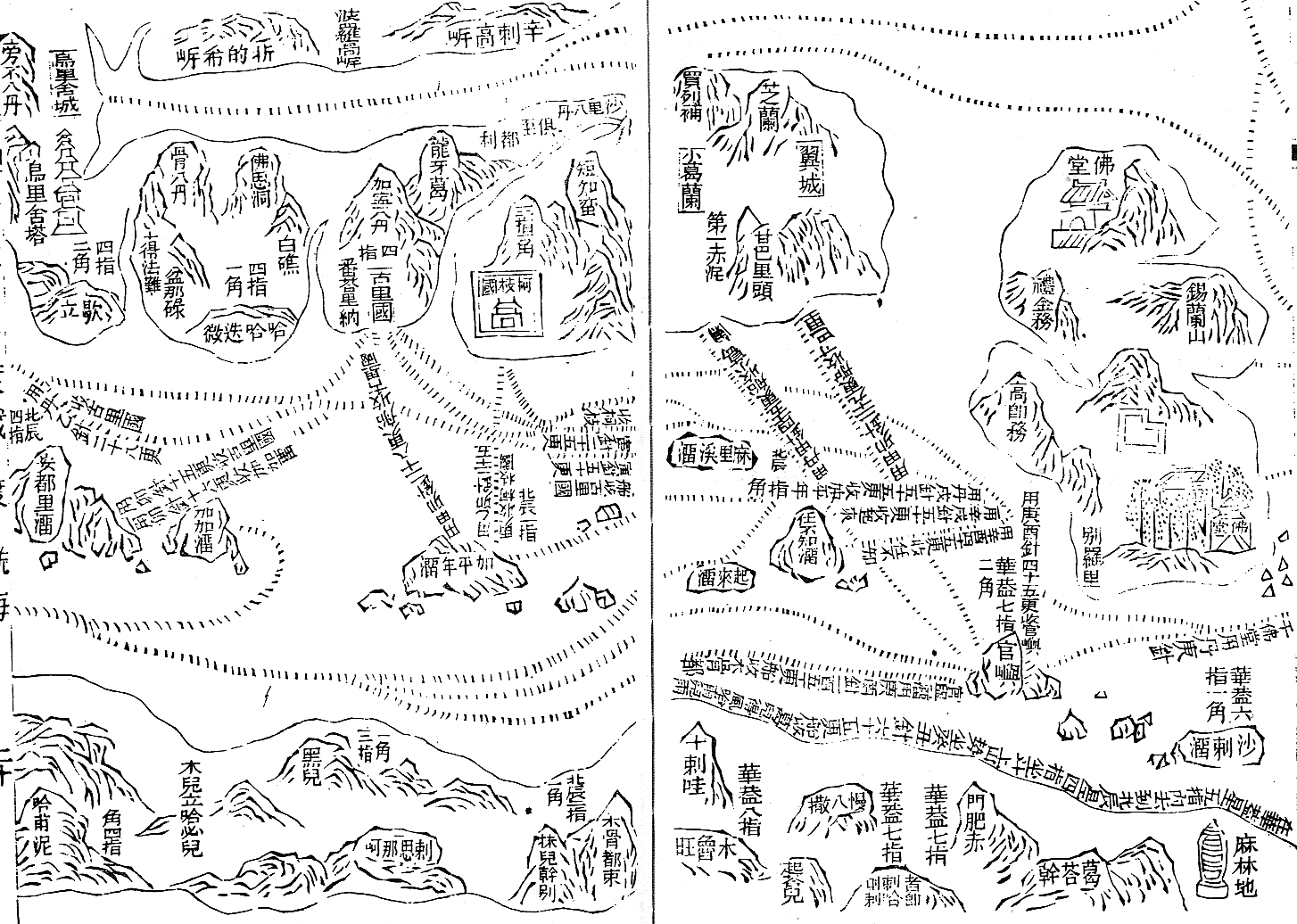
Map of the known world by Zheng He: India at the top, Ceylon at the upper right and East Africa along the bottom. Sailing directions and distances are marked using zhenlu (針路) or compass route.

After the flourishing of science and technology in the Song dynasty, the Ming perhaps saw fewer advancements in science and technology compared to the pace of discovery in the Western world. In fact, key advances in Chinese science in the late Ming were spurred by contact with Europe. In 1626 Johann Adam Schall von Bell wrote the first Chinese treatise on the telescope, the Yuanjingshuo (Far Seeing Optic Glass); in 1634 the Chongzhen Emperor acquired the telescope of the late Johann Schreck (1576–1630). The heliocentric model of the Solar System was rejected by the Catholic missionaries in China, but Johannes Kepler and Galileo Galilei's ideas slowly trickled into China starting with the Polish Jesuit Michael Boym (1612–1659) in 1627, Adam Schall von Bell's treatise in 1640, and finally Joseph Edkins, Alex Wylie, and John Fryer in the 19th century. Catholic Jesuits in China would promote Copernican theory at court, yet at the same time embrace the Ptolemaic system in their writing; it was not until 1865 that Catholic missionaries in China sponsored the heliocentric model as their Protestant peers did. Although Shen Kuo (1031–1095) and Guo Shoujing (1231–1316) had laid the basis for trigonometry in China, another important work in Chinese trigonometry would not be published again until 1607 with the efforts of Xu Guangqi and Matteo Ricci. Some inventions which had their origins in ancient China were reintroduced to China from Europe during the late Ming; for example, the field mill.

By the 16th century the Chinese calendar was in need of reform. Although the Ming had adopted Guo Shoujing's Shoushi calendar of 1281, which was just as accurate as the Gregorian calendar, the Ming Directorate of Astronomy failed to periodically readjust it; this was perhaps due to their lack of expertise since their offices had become hereditary in the Ming and the Statutes of the Ming prohibited private involvement in astronomy. A sixth-generation descendant of the Hongxi Emperor, the "Prince" Zhu Zaiyu (1536–1611), submitted a proposal to fix the calendar in 1595, but the ultra-conservative astronomical commission rejected it. This was the same Zhu Zaiyu who discovered the system of tuning known as equal temperament, a discovery made simultaneously by Simon Stevin (1548–1620) in Europe. In addition to publishing his works on music, he was able to publish his findings on the calendar in 1597. A year earlier, the memorial of Xing Yunlu suggesting a calendar improvement was rejected by the Supervisor of the Astronomical Bureau due to the law banning private practice of astronomy; Xing would later serve with Xu Guangqi to reform the calendar according to Western standards in 1629.

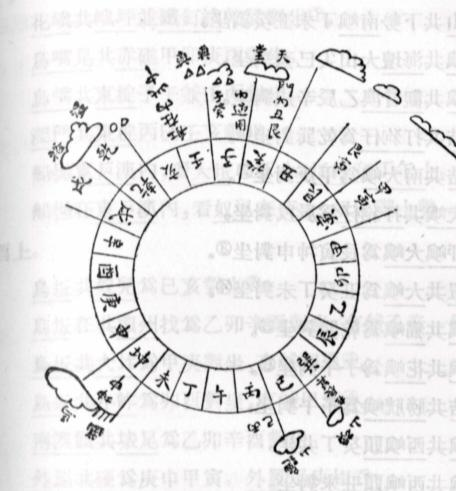
A 24-point compass chart employed by Zheng He during his explorations

When the Ming founder Hongwu Emperor came upon the mechanical devices housed in the Yuan palace at Khanbaliq—such as fountains with balls dancing on their jets, tiger automata, dragon-headed devices that spouted mists of perfume, and mechanical clocks in the tradition of Yi Xing (683–727) and Su Song (1020–1101)—he associated all of them with the decadence of Mongol rule and had them destroyed. This was described in full length by the Divisional Director of the Ministry of Works, Xiao Xun, who also carefully preserved details on the architecture and layout of the Yuan dynasty palace. Later, European Jesuits such as Matteo Ricci and Nicolas Trigault would briefly mention indigenous Chinese clockworks that featured drive wheels. However, both Ricci and Trigault were quick to point out that 16th-century European clockworks were far more advanced than the common time keeping devices in China, which they listed as water clocks, incense clocks, and "other instruments ... with wheels rotated by sand as if by water" (Chinese: 沙漏). Chinese records—namely the Yuan Shi—describe the 'five-wheeled sand clock', a mechanism pioneered by Zhan Xiyuan (fl. 1360–1380) which featured the scoop wheel of Su Song's earlier astronomical clock and a stationary dial face over which a pointer circulated, similar to European models of the time. This sand-driven wheel clock was improved upon by Zhou Shuxue (fl. 1530–1558) who added a fourth large gear wheel, changed gear ratios, and widened the orifice for collecting sand grains since he criticized the earlier model for clogging up too often.

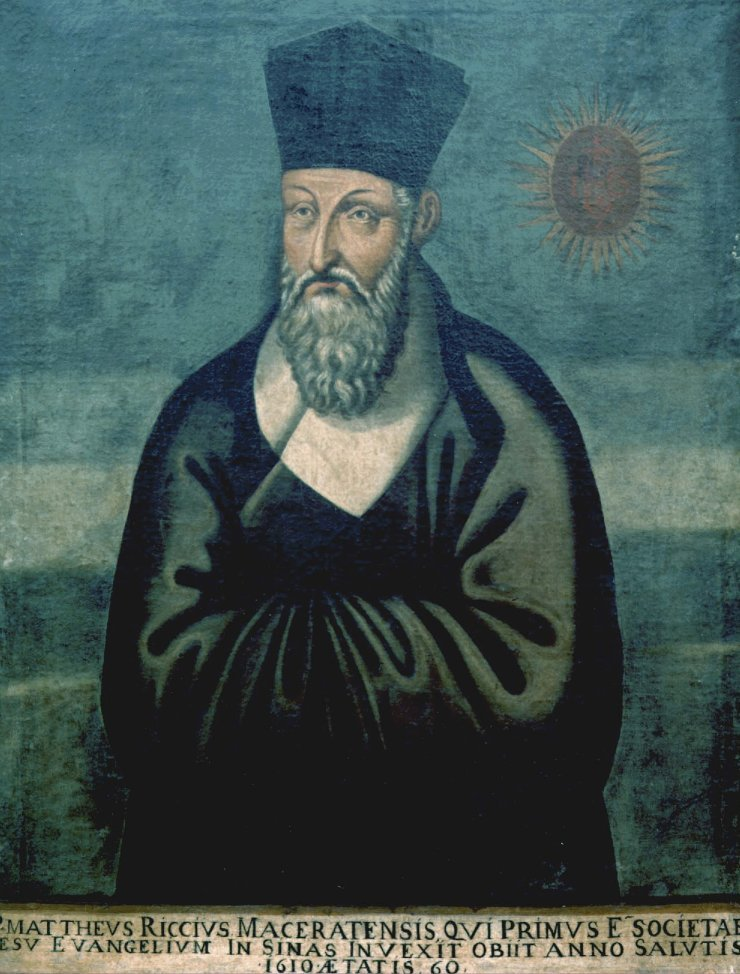
Portrait of Matteo Ricci by Yu Wenhui, Latinized as Emmanuel Pereira, dated the year of Ricci's death, 1610

The Chinese were intrigued with European technology, but so were visiting Europeans of Chinese technology. In 1584, Abraham Ortelius (1527–1598) featured in his atlas Theatrum Orbis Terrarum the peculiar Chinese innovation of mounting masts and sails onto carriages, just like Chinese ships. Gonzales de Mendoza also mentioned this a year later—noting even the designs of them on Chinese silken robes—while Gerardus Mercator (1512–1594) featured them in his atlas, John Milton (1608–1674) in one of his famous poems, and Andreas Everardus van Braam Houckgeest (1739–1801) in the writings of his travel diary in China. The encyclopedist Song Yingxing (1587–1666) documented a wide array of technologies, metallurgic and industrial processes in his Tiangong Kaiwu encyclopedia of 1637. This includes mechanical and hydraulic powered devices for agriculture and irrigation, nautical technology such as vessel types and snorkeling gear for pearl divers, the annual processes of sericulture and weaving with the loom, metallurgic processes such as the crucible technique and quenching, manufacturing processes such as for roasting iron pyrite in converting sulphide to oxide in sulfur used in gunpowder compositions—illustrating how ore was piled up with coal briquettes in an earthen furnace with a still-head that sent over sulfur as vapor that would solidify and crystallize—and the use of gunpowder weapons such as a naval mine ignited by use of a rip-cord and steel flint wheel.

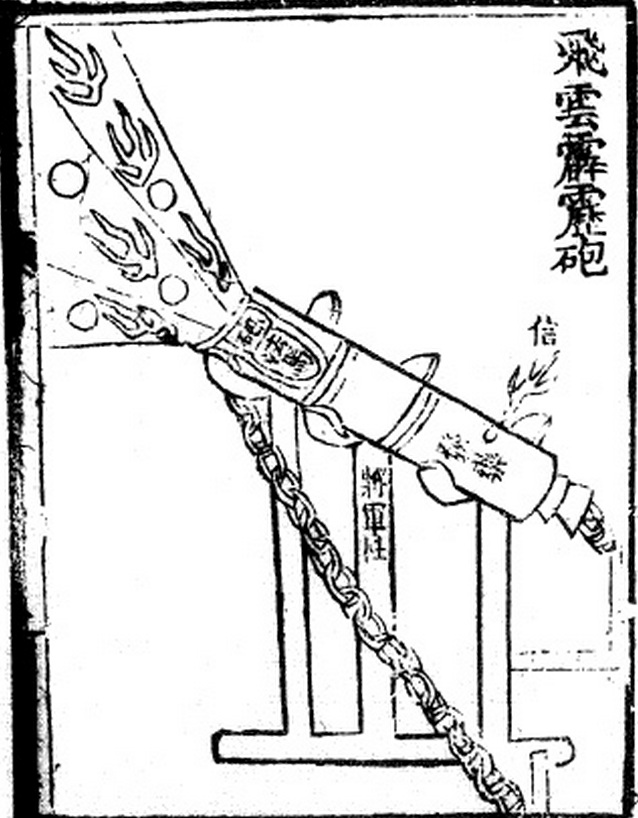
A cannon from the Huolongjing, compiled by Jiao Yu and Liu Bowen before the latter's death in 1375

Focusing on agriculture in his Nongzheng Quanshu, the agronomist Xu Guangqi (1562–1633) took an interest in irrigation, fertilizers, famine relief, economic and textile crops, and empirical observation of the elements that gave insight into early understandings of chemistry.

There were many advances and new designs in gunpowder weapons during the beginning of the dynasty, but by the mid to late Ming the Chinese began to frequently employ European-style artillery and firearms. The Huolongjing, compiled by Jiao Yu and Liu Bowen sometime before the latter's death on 16 May 1375 (with a preface added by Jiao in 1412), featured many types of cutting-edge gunpowder weaponry for the time. This includes hollow, gunpowder-filled exploding cannonballs, land mines that used a complex trigger mechanism of falling weights, pins, and a steel wheellock to ignite the train of fuses, naval mines, fin-mounted winged rockets for aerodynamic control, multistage rockets propelled by booster rockets before igniting a swarm of smaller rockets issuing forth from the end of the missile (shaped like a dragon's head), and hand cannons that had up to |ten barrels.

Li Shizhen (1518–1593)—one of the most renowned pharmacologists and physicians in Chinese history—belonged to the late Ming period. His Bencao Gangmu is a medical text with 1,892 entries, each entry with its own name called a gang. The mu in the title refers to the synonyms of each name. Inoculation, although it can be traced to earlier Chinese folk medicine, was detailed in Chinese texts by the sixteenth century. Throughout the Ming, around fifty texts were published on the treatment of smallpox. In regards to oral hygiene, the ancient Egyptians had a primitive toothbrush of a twig frayed at the end, but the Chinese were the first to invent the modern bristle toothbrush in 1498, although it used stiff pig hair.

== Population ==
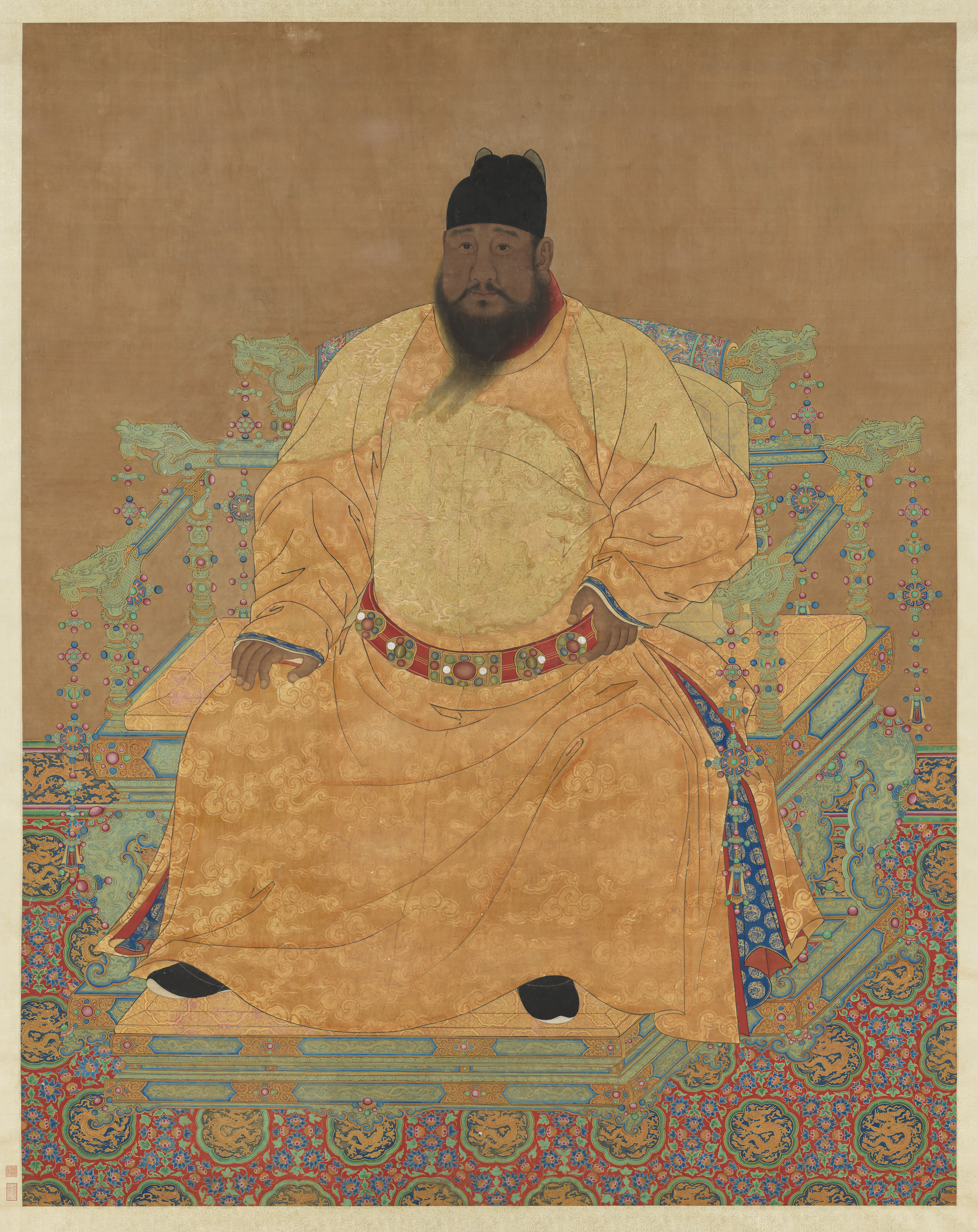
The Xuande Emperor (r. 1425–1435); he stated in 1428 that his populace was dwindling due to palace construction and military adventures. But the population was rising under him, a fact noted by Zhou Chen—governor of South Zhili—in his 1432 report to the throne about widespread itinerant commerce.

Sinologist historians debate the population figures for each era in the Ming dynasty. The historian Timothy Brook notes that the Ming government census figures are dubious since fiscal obligations prompted many families to underreport the number of people in their households and many county officials to underreport the number of households in their jurisdiction. Children were often underreported, especially female children, as shown by skewed population statistics throughout the Ming. Even adult women were underreported; for example, the Daming Prefecture in North Zhili reported a population of 378,167 males and 226,982 females in 1502. The government attempted to revise the census figures using estimates of the expected average number of people in each household, but this did not solve the widespread problem of tax registration. Some part of the gender imbalance may be attributed to the practice of female infanticide. The practice is well documented in China, going back over two thousand years, and it was described as "rampant" and "practiced by almost every family" by contemporary authors. However, the dramatically skewed sex ratios, which many counties reported exceeding 2:1 by 1586, cannot likely be explained by infanticide alone.

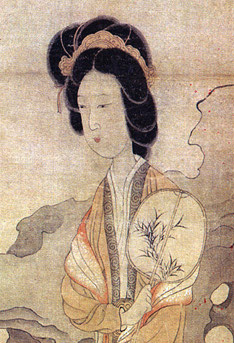
Appreciating Plums, by Chen Hongshou (1598–1652), showing a woman holding an oval fan while enjoying the beauty of the plum

The number of people counted in the 1381 census was 59,873,305; however, this number dropped significantly when the government found that some 3 million people were missing from the tax census of 1391. Even though underreporting figures was made a capital crime in 1381, the need for survival pushed many to abandon the tax registration and wander from their region, where the Hongwu Emperor had attempted to impose rigid immobility on the populace. The government tried to mitigate this by creating their own conservative estimate of 60,545,812 people in 1393. In his Studies on the Population of China, Ping-ti Ho suggests revising the 1393 census to 65 million people, noting that large areas of North China and frontier areas were not counted in that census. Brook states that the population figures gathered in the official censuses after 1393 ranged between 51 and 62 million, while the population was in fact increasing. Even the Hongzhi Emperor (r. 1487–1505) remarked that the daily increase in subjects coincided with the daily dwindling number of registered civilians and soldiers. William Atwell estimates the population of China around 1400 at 90 million people, citing Heijdra and Mote.

Historians are now turning to local gazetteers of Ming China for clues that would show consistent growth in population. Using the gazetteers, Brook estimates that the overall population under the Chenghua Emperor (r. 1464–1487) was roughly 75 million, despite mid-Ming census figures hovering around 62 million. While prefectures across the empire in the mid-Ming period were reporting either a drop in or stagnant population size, local gazetteers reported massive amounts of incoming vagrant workers with not enough good cultivated land for them to till, so that many would become drifters, con-men, or wood-cutters that contributed to deforestation. The Hongzhi and Zhengde emperors lessened the penalties against those who had fled their home region, while the Jiajing Emperor (r. 1521–1567) finally had officials register migrants wherever they had moved or fled in order to bring in more revenues.

Even with the Jiajing reforms to document migrant workers and merchants, by the late Ming era the government census still did not accurately reflect the enormous growth in population. Gazetteers across the empire noted this and made their own estimations of the overall population in the Ming, some guessing that it had doubled, tripled, or even grown five-fold since 1368. Fairbank estimates a population of 160 million during the late Ming, while Brook estimates 175 million, and Ebrey estimates 200 million. However, a great epidemic that started in Shanxi in 1633, ravaged the densely populated areas along the Grand Canal; a gazetteer in northern Zhejiang noted more than half the population fell ill that year and that 90% of the local populace in one area was dead by 1642.

== See also ==
- 1642 Yellow River flood
- Architecture of the Ming dynasty
- Culture of the Ming dynasty
- Economy of the Ming dynasty
  - Taxation in premodern China
- Government of the Ming dynasty
- History of the Ming dynasty
- Kingdom of Tungning
- List of tributary states of China
- Luchuan–Pingmian campaigns
- Manchuria under Ming rule
- Military of the Ming dynasty
- Ming ceramics
- Ming dynasty in Inner Asia
- Ming dynasty family tree
- Ming official headwear
- Ming poetry
- Transition from Ming to Qing
- Ye Chunji (for further information on rural economics in the Ming)
- Zheng Zhilong

== Notes ==
Preceded by Yuan dynasty	Dynasties in Chinese history 1368–1644	Succeeded by Qing dynasty
