= Yishiha =

Ming dynasty explorer and diplomat (1409–1451)

- Citizenship: Ming dynasty
- Years active: fl. 1409-1451

Yishiha (Chinese: 亦失哈; Wade–Giles: Ishiha/I-shih-ha; also rendered as Išiqa and Isiha; Jurchen: i ʃï xa) (fl. 1409–1451), sinicized name Yi Xin (易信), was a Jurchen eunuch of the Ming dynasty of China. He served the Ming emperors who commissioned several expeditions down the Songhua and Amur Rivers during the period of Ming rule of Manchuria, and is credited with the construction of the only two Ming dynasty Buddhist temples ever built on the territory of present-day Russia.

== Early life ==
Yishiha's voyages in the context of military and diplomatic activities in the Yongle era of the Ming dynasty. Yishiha's route is in blue, along with those of Zheng He (in black) and Chen Cheng (in green).

It is believed that Yishiha was a Haixi Jurchen by origin, and was captured by the Ming forces in the late 14th century. He worked under two important eunuchs, Wang Zhen and Cao Jixiang. It is speculated by modern historians that he rose to prominence by participating in imperial court politics and serving the Yongle Emperor's concubines of Manchu (Jurchen) origin.

== Amur expeditions ==
Yishiha's Amur expeditions belong to the same period of the Yongle Emperor's reign (1402–1424) which saw another eunuch admiral, Zheng He, sail across the Indian Ocean, and Chinese ambassador Chen Cheng reach the Timurid Empire's capital Herat (in today's Afghanistan) overland.

By 1409, the Yongle Emperor's government, which had already established relations with the Haixi and Jianzhou Jurchens in southern Manchuria, ordered Yishiha to start preparations for an expedition to the lower Amur River region, to demonstrate the power of the Ming Empire to the Nurgan Jurchen populating the area and induce them to enter into relations with the empire, and to ensure that they would not create trouble for the Ming state when the latter went to war with the Eastern Mongols.

In 1411, after two years of preparations, Yishiha's fleet of 25 ships with 1000 men aboard sailed from Jilin City down the Sungari and into the Amur. The "Nurgan Jurchens" offered little opposition to Yishiha's expedition. He gave generous gifts to their tribal leaders, and established a Nurgan Regional Military Commission, at the place the Chinese called Telin (特林), near the present-day village of Tyr in Russia's Khabarovsk Krai. This was the same place where in 1260–1320 the Mongol-led Yuan dynasty had the headquarters of their Marshal of the Eastern Campaigns. The commission's authority covered much of the Amur basin, including the shores of the Sungari, Ussuri, Urmi, Muling, and Nen Rivers. Yishiha then returned to the Ming Empire, taking with him a tribute-bearing mission of 178 "Nurgan Jurchens".

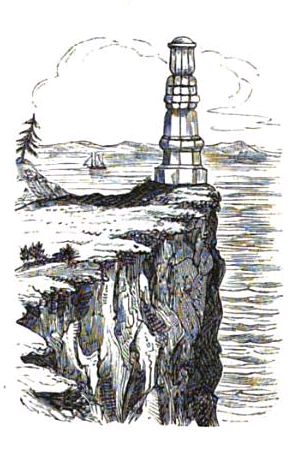
A pillar on top of the Tyr Cliff, remaining from, apparently, Yishiha's second temple, as seen ca. 1860

In 1413–1414, during his second expeditions to the lower Amur, Yishiha stayed almost a year at Tyr. He built a Buddhist temple (sometimes described as a "monastery") named Yongning Si (永宁寺, the Temple of Eternal Peace) dedicated to Guanyin on the Tyr Cliff, and erected a stele describing his expedition, with the text in Chinese, Mongol, and Jurchen languages. The stele, presently kept in the Arseniev Museum in Vladivostok, described the locals as good archers and fishermen, and their clothes as made of fishskin. According to some evidence (a seal issued by the empire's Ministry of Rites, found in Yilan County, Heilongjiang), in 1413 Yishiha also visited the nearby coast of the Sakhalin Island, and granted Ming titles to a local chieftain.

While no detailed ethnographic data about the "Nurgan Jurchens" has been found in Chinese records, it was, apparently, a collective name for the Tungusic peoples and possibly other groups (e.g. Nivkh) populating the area. As of the mid-19th century, Tyr was a Nivkh settlement, as attested by a contemporary encyclopedia and the book by E.G. Ravenstein, based on the accounts of the Russian explorers of the 1850s. Another ethnic group native to the Ulchsky District (where Tyr is located) are the Ulch people, a Tungusic people, but their home villages are all located upstream from Tyr.

During the rest of the Yongle Emperor's reign, Yishiha carried out three more expeditions to Nurgan, while the Nurgan natives sent some more tribute and trade missions to the Ming court.

The Yongle Emperor's successor (the short-lived Hongxi Emperor (r. 1424–25), or, more likely, the Xuande Emperor (r. 1425–35)) continued the Yongle era's policy toward the "Wild Jurchens". In 1425, the Liaodong regional commissioner, Liu Qing, was ordered to build ships for another expedition down the river, and in 1426 Yishiha sailed again.

Yishiha's last mission was connected to the retirement of the Nurgan chief and the "inauguration" of his son as his successor. Yishiha attended at that event in 1432, presenting the new chief a seal of authority and giving gifts to subordinate chieftains. This time Yishiha's fleet included 50 big ships with 2,000 soldiers, and they actually brought the new chief (who had been living in Beijing) to Tyr. As Yishiha's first (1413) Yongning Si temple had been destroyed by that time, Yishiha had a second temple of the same name built. According to the modern archaeologists, his second temple was not built at the site of his first temple (as it had been commonly believed), but rather at the site of its ancient predecessor – the Yuan Dynasty Yongning Si temple. As the archaeological research has revealed, the 1413 temple was located some 90 meters to the west of the top of the Tyr Cliff, where Yishiha's 1430s temple (and its Yuan predecessor) were located. A second stele was put next to the second temple. The stele has also survived, and has been moved south by the Russians for keeping at the Arsenyev Primorye Museum in Vladivostok.

According to modern historians, Yishiha made the total of nine expeditions to the Lower Amur.

== Later career ==
In the 1430s, the Xuande government stopped sending sea and river expeditions, and the naval (or, rather, riverine) career of Yishiha came to an end, as did that of his colleague Zheng He. In the ninth year of the Ming Xuande emperor the Jurchens in Manchuria under Ming rule suffered from famine forcing them to sell their daughters into slavery and moving to Liaodong to beg for help and relief from the Ming dynasty government. In 1435 Yishiha was put in charge of the defense of the Liaodong region; he remained at this post for over 15 years. Apparently, his performance during the raids of the Oirad Mongol chief Esen Tayisi was considered unsatisfactory, and some time between 1449 and 1451 he was relieved of his duties. No later traces of him have been found by modern historians.

== See also ==
- Manchuria under Ming rule
- Nurgan Regional Military Commission
