= Nurgan Regional Military Commission =

Ming dynasty administrative unit in Manchuria

Nurgan Regional Military Commission 努尔干地区军事委员会
- 1409–1435
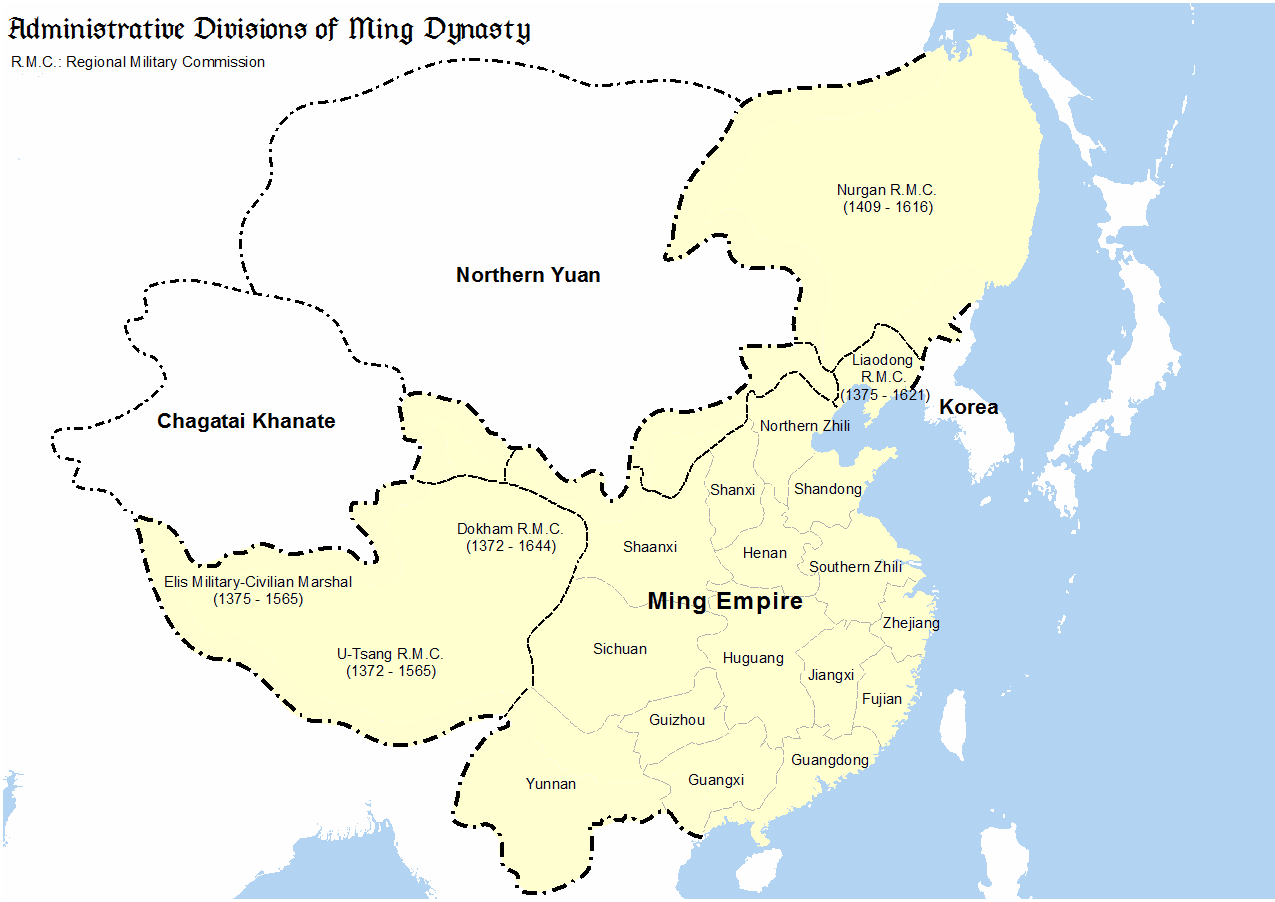
- Administrative divisions of Ming dynasty in 1409; Nurgan Regional Military Commission is in the northeast.
- Capital: Nurgan
- Common languages: Han Chinese, Jurchen
- Historical era: Ming dynasty
  - Established: 1409
  - Dissolved: 1435

The Nurgan Regional Military Commission (Chinese: 努尔干地区军事委员会; pinyin: Nǔ Ěr Gàn Dìqū Jūnshì Wěiyuánhuì) was a Chinese administrative seat established in Manchuria (including modern-day Northeast China and Outer Manchuria) during the Ming dynasty. It was located on the banks of the Amur River, about 100 km from the Sea of Japan, at Nurgan City (modern-day Tyr, Russia). Nurgan ( nu ru (g)ə(n)) in the Jurchen language means "painting".

== History ==
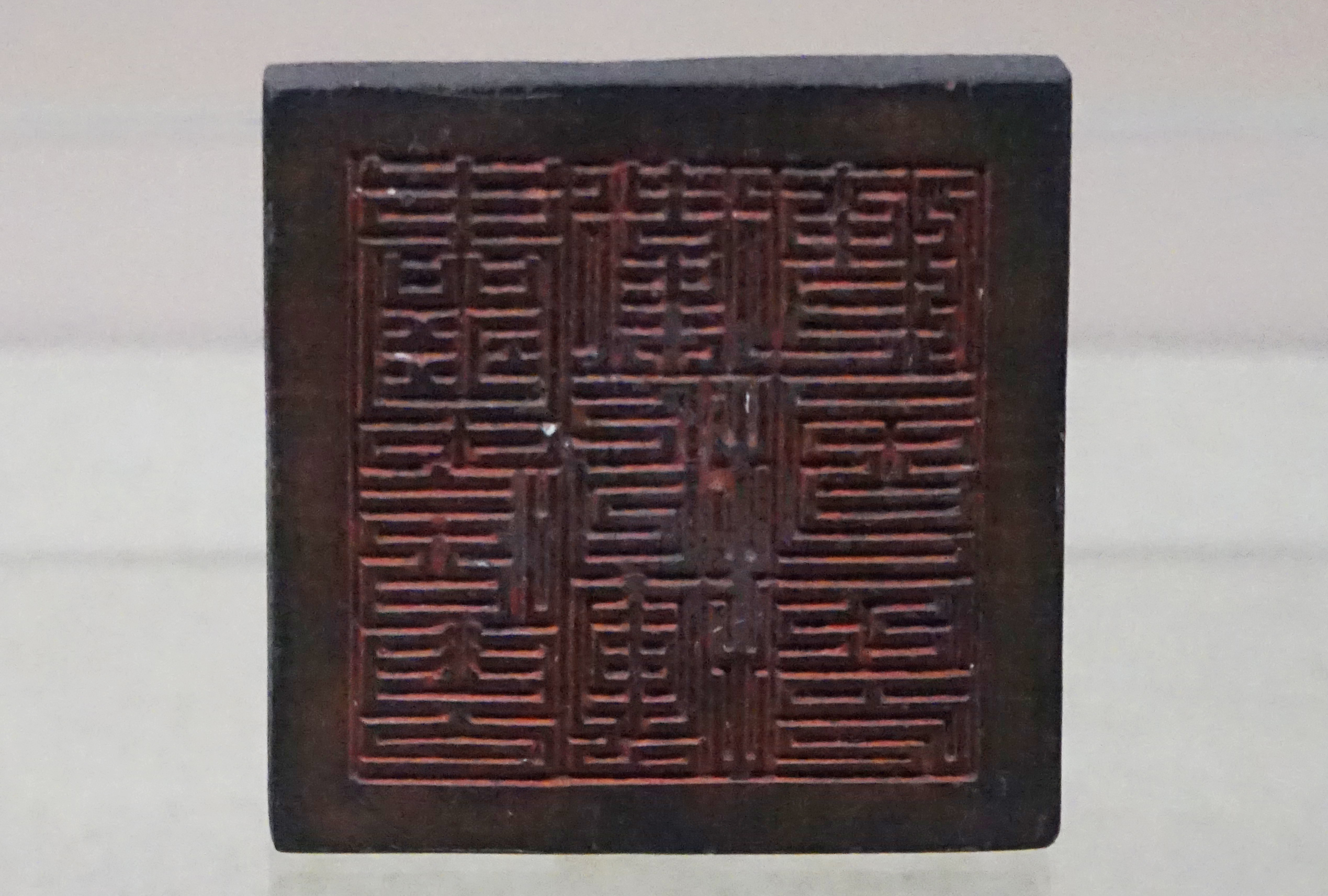
Seal of Nanghal Guard Commander (南哈尔卫队指挥官印章). The Nanghal Guard was a military garrison established in 1412 by Ming dynasty in Kuwu (库武), located in the northern part of present-day Sakhalin Island, under the jurisdiction of the Nurgan Regional Military Commission

The seat was nominally established in 1409, but was abandoned in 1435. Near modern Tyr, Russia, Nurgan was the site of Yongning Temple (永寧寺), a Buddhist temple dedicated to Guanyin, that was founded by Yishiha (Išiqa) in 1413. The founding of Yongning Temple is recorded in the Yongning Temple Stele with inscriptions in Chinese, Mongolian and Jurchen scripts. The commission was an important institution during the Ming rule of Manchuria, obtaining at least the nominal allegiance of the lower Amur's tribes to the Ming government.

By 1409, the Yongle Emperor's government, which had already established formal relations with the Haixi and Jianzhou Jurchens in southern Manchuria, ordered Yishiha to start preparations for an expedition to the lower Amur River region, to demonstrate the power of the Ming Dynasty to the Nurgan Jurchen populating the area and induce them to enter into relations with the empire, and to ensure that they would not create unnecessary trouble for the Ming state when the latter eventually went to war with the Eastern Mongols in Turkestan.

In 1413 Yishiha also visited the nearby coast of the Sakhalin Island, and granted Ming titles to a local chieftain.

Some sources report a Chinese fort existed at Aigun for about 20 years during the Yongle era on the left (northwestern) shore of the Amur downstream from the mouth of the Zeya River. This Ming dynasty Aigun was located on the opposite bank to the later Aigun that was relocated during the Qing dynasty.

Yishiha's last mission was connected to the retirement of the Nurgan chief and the "inauguration" of his son as his successor. Yishiha attended the event in 1432, presenting the new chief a seal of authority and giving gifts to subordinate chieftains. This time Yishiha's fleet included 50 big ships with 2,000 soldiers, and they actually brought the new chief (who had been living in Beijing) to Tyr.

== Tribute ==
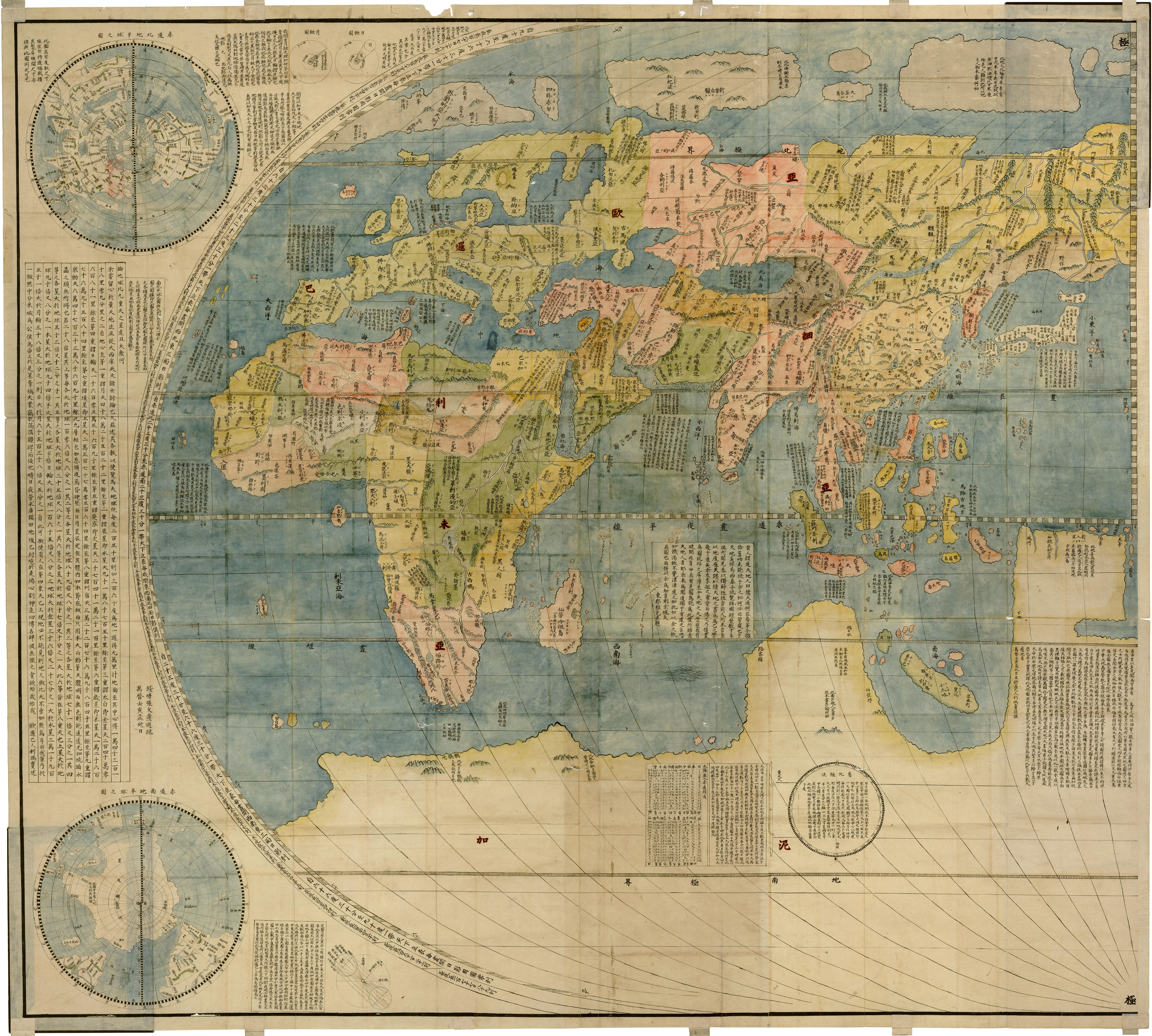
A 17th century Chinese map of Eurasia. Nurgan (努尔甘) is depicted in gray, to the north of Japan

Nivkh women in Sakhalin married Han Chinese Ming officials when the Ming took tribute from Sakhalin and the Amur river region. Boluohe, Nanghar and Wuliehe were Yuan posts set up to receive tribute from the Ainu after their war with the Yuan ended in 1308. Ming Chinese outposts in Sakhalin and the Amur river area received animal skin tribute from Ainu on Sakhalin, Uilta and Nivkh in the 15th century after the Tyr based Yongning Temple was set up along with the Nurkan (Nurgan) outposts by the Yongle emperor in 1409. The Ming also held the post at Wuliehe and received marten pelt fur tribute from the assistant commander Alige in 1431 from Sakhalin after the Ming assigned titles like weizhenfu (official charged with subjugation), zhihui qianshi (assistance commander), zhihui tongzhi (vice commander) and Zhihuishi (commander) from Sakhalin indigenous headmen. The Ming received tribute from the headmen Alingge, Tuolingha, Sanchiha and Zhaluha in 1437. The position of headman among Sakhalin indigenous peoples was inherited paternally from father to son and the sons came with their fathers to Wuliehe.

Ming officials gave silk uniforms with the appropriate rank to the Sakhalin Ainu, Uilta and Nivkh after they gave tribute. The Maritime Province region had the Ming "system for subjugated peoples" implementers in it for the Sakhalin indigenous peoples. Sakhalin received iron tools from mainland Asia through this trade as Tungus groups joined in from 1456 to 1487. Local indigenous hierarchies had Ming Chinese given political offices integrated with them.

The Ming system on Sakhalin was continued by the Qing dynasty.

Due to Ming rule in Manchuria, Chinese cultural and religious influence such as Chinese New Year, the "Chinese god", Chinese motifs like the dragon, spirals, scrolls, and material goods like agriculture, husbandry, heating, iron cooking pots, silk, and cotton spread among the Amur natives like the Udeghes, Ulchis, and Nanais.

== See also ==
- Manchuria under Ming rule
