= Manchuria under Qing rule =

History of Asian region, 1616–1912

- Military governorates; later provinces of the Qing dynasty
- 1616–1912
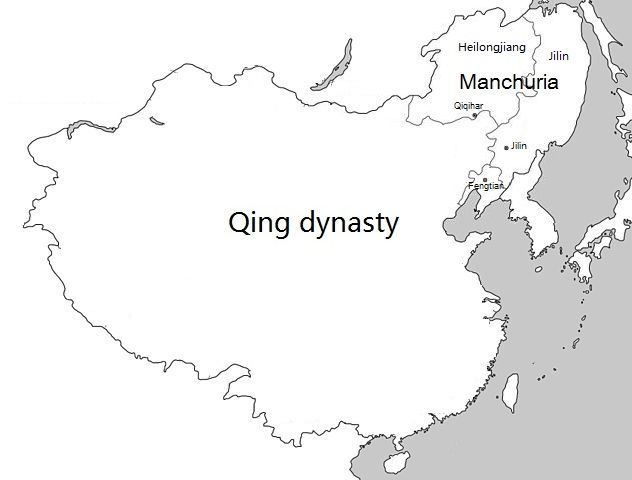
- Manchuria within the Qing dynasty in 1820, including Fengtian, Jilin and Heilongjiang
- Government
  - Type: Qing hierarchy
- History
  - Later Jin established: 1616
  - Sino-Russian border conflicts: 1652–1689
  - Amur Annexation by Russians: 1858–1860
  - Conversion into provinces: 1907
  - Establishment of Republic of China: 1912
| Preceded by | Succeeded by |
| Ming dynasty | Republic of China; Russian Empire |

Manchuria under Qing rule was the rule of the Qing dynasty of China (and its predecessor the Later Jin dynasty) over the greater region of Manchuria, including today's Northeast China and Outer Manchuria, although Outer Manchuria was lost to the Russian Empire after the Amur Annexation. The Qing dynasty itself was established by the Manchus, a Tungusic people from Manchuria, who later replaced the Ming dynasty as the ruling dynasty of China. Thus, the region is often seen to have had a special status during the Qing and was not governed as regular provinces until the late Qing dynasty, although the name "Manchuria" itself is an exonym of Japanese origin and was not used by the Qing dynasty in Chinese or Manchu.

== History ==
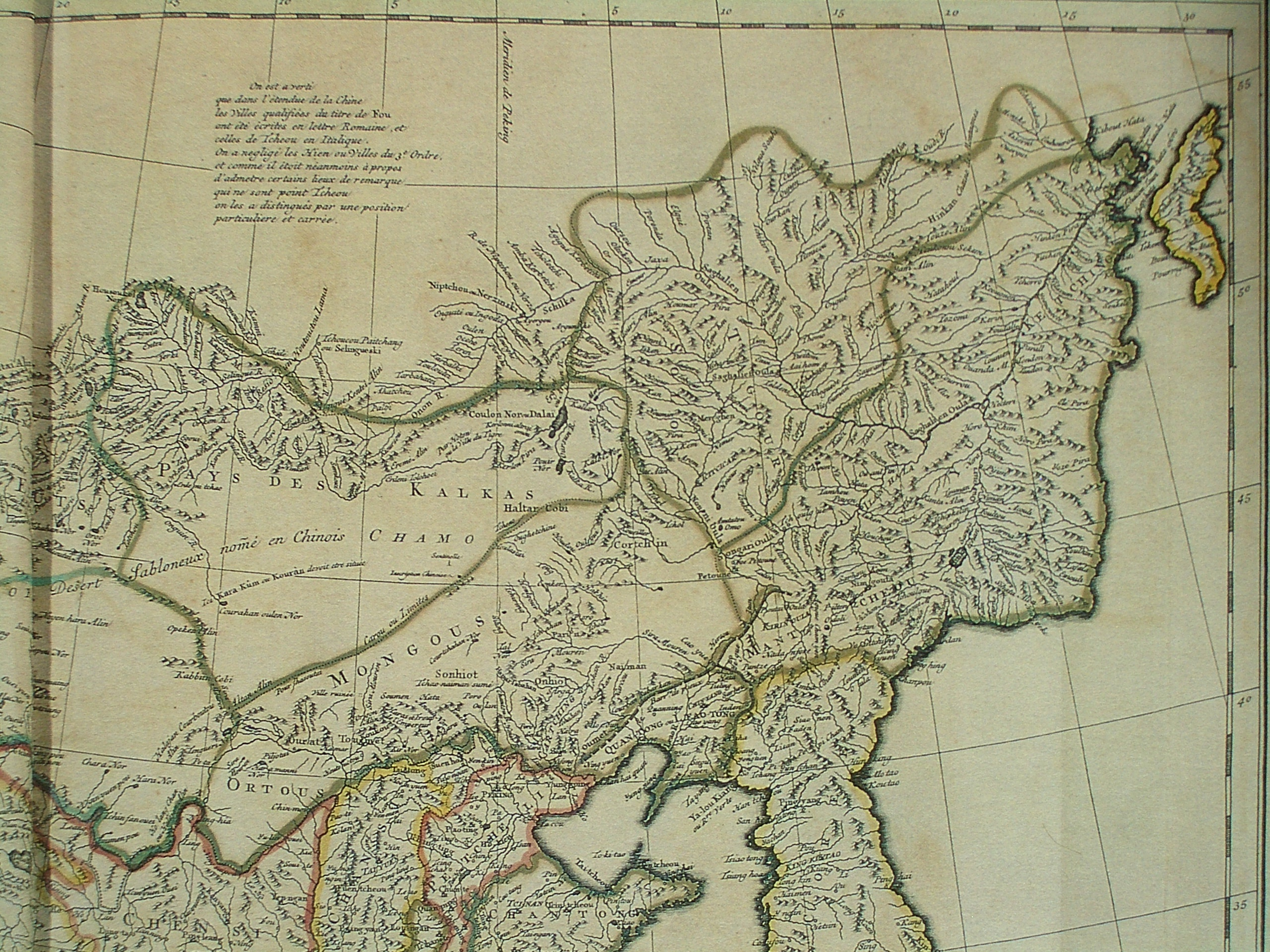
Map of Northeast part of Qing Empire circa 1730s.

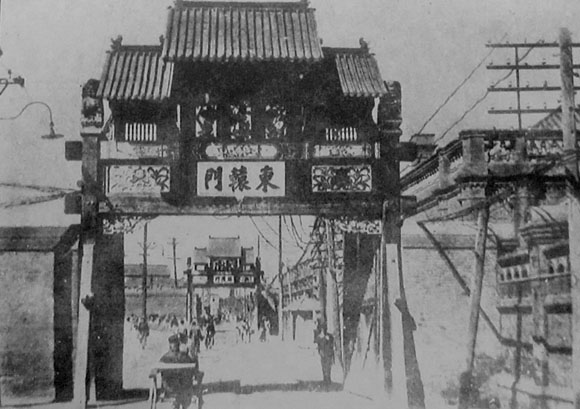
Shengjing General's Gate Front Gate

The Qing dynasty was founded not by Han Chinese, who form the majority of the Chinese population, but by a sedentary farming people known as the Jurchen, a Tungusic people who lived around the region now comprising the Chinese provinces of Jilin and Heilongjiang. Although the Ming dynasty held control over Manchuria since the late 1380s, Ming political existence in the region waned considerably after the death of the Yongle Emperor. What was to become the Manchu state was founded by Nurhaci, the chieftain of a minor Jurchen tribe in Jianzhou in the early 17th century. Originally a vassal of the Ming emperors, Nurhaci started to take actual control of most of Manchuria over the next several decades. In 1616, he declared himself the "Bright Khan" of the Later Jin state. Two years later he announced the "Seven Grievances" and openly renounced the sovereignty of Ming overlordship to complete the unification of those Jurchen tribes still allied with the Ming emperor. After a series of successful battles against both the Ming and various tribes in Outer Manchuria, he and his son Hong Taiji eventually controlled the whole of Manchuria. Soon after the establishment of the Qing dynasty, the territory of today's Primorsky Kray was made part of the Government-general of Jilin, and along with the lower Amur area was controlled from Ningguta (a garrison town south of today's Mudanjiang).

The Qing stationed the "New Manchu" Warka foragers in Ningguta and attempted to turn them into farmers. Still, the Warka reverted to a hunter-gatherer lifestyle and asked for money to buy cattle for beef broth. The Qing forced the Warka to become soldier-farmers, but the Warka left their garrison at Ningguta and returned to their homes along the Sungari River to herd, fish, and hunt. The Qing accused them of desertion.

However, during the Qing conquest of the Ming in the later decades, the Tsardom of Russia tried to gain the land north of the Amur River. The Russian conquest of Siberia was accompanied by massacres due to indigenous resistance to colonization by the Russian Cossacks, who savagely crushed the natives. At the hands of people like Vasilii Poyarkov in 1645 and Yerofei Khabarov in 1650 some peoples like the Daur were slaughtered by the Russians to the extent that it is considered genocide. The Daurs initially deserted their villages since they heard about the cruelty of the Russians the first time Khabarov came. The second time he came, the Daurs decided to do battle against the Russians instead but were slaughtered by Russian guns. The indigenous peoples of the Amur region were attacked by Russians who came to be known as "red-beards". The Russian Cossacks were named luocha (羅剎), after demons found in Buddhist mythology, by the Amur natives because of their cruelty towards the Amur tribes people, who were subjects of the Qing. The Russian proselytization of Orthodox Christianity to the indigenous peoples along the Amur River was viewed as a threat by the Qing. This was eventually rebutted by the Qing during the Sino-Russian border conflicts in the 1680s, resulting in the Treaty of Nerchinsk in 1689 which gave the land to China.

Since the region was considered the homeland of the Manchus, Han Chinese citizens were banned from settling in this region by the early Qing government but the rule was openly violated and Han Chinese became a majority in urban areas by the early 19th century. During Qing rule there was a massively increasing amount of Han Chinese both illegally and legally streaming into Manchuria and settling down to cultivate land as Manchu landlords desired Han Chinese peasants to rent on their land and grow grain, most Han Chinese migrants were not evicted as they went over the Great Wall and Willow Palisade, during the eighteenth century Han Chinese farmed 500,000 hectares of privately owned land in Manchuria and 203,583 hectares of lands which were part of courier stations, noble estates, and Banner lands, in garrisons and towns in Manchuria Han Chinese made up 80% of the population. Although those areas did not appear similar to the provinces in China proper before they were converted into regular provinces in 1907, the Qing dynasty also called them “Eastern three provinces“ (ᡩᡝᡵᡤᡳ
ᡳᠯᠠᠨ
ᡤᠣᠯᠣ dergi ilan golo; simplified Chinese: 东三省; traditional Chinese: 東三省; pinyin: Dōng Sānshěng).

Han Chinese farmers were resettled from North China by the Qing to the area along the Liao River in order to restore the land to cultivation. Wasteland was reclaimed by Han Chinese squatters in addition to other Han who rented land from Manchu landlords. Despite officially prohibiting Han Chinese settlement on the Manchu and Mongol lands, by the 18th century the Qing decided to settle Han refugees from northern China who were suffering from famine, floods, and drought into Manchuria and Inner Mongolia so that Han Chinese farmed 500,000 hectares in Manchuria and tens of thousands of hectares in Inner Mongolia by the 1780s. The Qianlong Emperor allowed Han Chinese peasants suffering from drought to move into Manchuria despite him issuing edicts in favor of banning them from 1740 to 1776. Chinese tenant farmers rented or even claimed title to land from the "imperial estates" and Manchu Bannerlands in the area. Besides moving into the Liao area in southern Manchuria, the path linking Jinzhou, Fengtian, Tieling, Changchun, Hulun, and Ningguta was settled by Han Chinese during the Qianlong Emperor's reign, and Han Chinese were the majority in urban areas of Manchuria by 1800. To increase the Imperial Treasury's revenue, the Qing sold formerly Manchu only lands along the Sungari to Han Chinese at the beginning of the Daoguang Emperor's reign, and Han Chinese filled up most of Manchuria's towns by the 1840s according to Abbe Huc. However, the policy for banning the Han Chinese citizens from moving to northern part of Manchuria was not officially lifted until 1860, when Outer Manchuria was lost to the Russians during the Amur Annexation by the Russian Empire. After that, the Qing court started to encourage immigration of Han Chinese into the region, which began the period of Chuang Guandong.

After conquering the Ming, the Qing identified their state as Zhongguo ("中國", the term for "China" in modern Chinese), and referred to it as "Dulimbai Gurun" in Manchu. "China" thus referred to the Qing in official documents, international treaties, and foreign affairs. The lands in Manchuria were explicitly stated by the Qing to belong to "China" (Zhongguo, Dulimbai gurun) in Qing edicts and in the 1689 Treaty of Nerchinsk.

In Manchuria in 1800, wealthy Han Chinese merchants stood at the top of the social ladder, just below the high-ranking banner officers, with whom they had many social, cultural and business relationships —merchant and officers often meeting one another on terms of equality. Han Chinese society in Manchuria was an uprooted society of immigrants, most of whom, except in Fengtian (Liaoning), had lived where they were for only a number of decades. Although the settlers had come mainly from Zhili, Shandong and Shanxi and had brought with them many of the social patterns of those provinces, the immigrants derived from the poorer and less educated elements of society, with the result that at the beginning of the nineteenth century a "gentry" class of the type known in China proper - families of education, wealth and prestige who had exercised social leadership in a given locality for generations - had only recently come into being in Fengtian province and cannot be said to have existed in the Manchurian frontier at all. At the bottom of the society were the unskilled workmen, domestic servants, prostitutes and exiled convicts, including slaves. One of the capacities in which Manchuria, especially Jilin and Heilongjiang, had served the Qing Empire was as a place of exile, not only for disgraced officials but also for convicted criminals. The worse the crimes and the more hardened the offenders, the farther north the Qing judicial system generally sent them. Many of these criminals took up crafts or small businesses, eventually becoming dependable members of society, but their presence in increasing numbers added to the lawless, rough-and-ready character of Manchurian frontier society.

Manchuria from the early to middle Qing period was governed by the military governors of Fengtian, Jilin and Heilongjiang. In both Jilin and Heilongjiang, most of whose territories were not easily accessible, there lived a considerable Han Chinese outlaw population. The number of these outlaws had grown rapidly in the eighteenth century and continued to rise in the nineteenth. Some of them, especially the goldminers and bandits, formed organized communities with rudimentary local governments. Groups of outlaw ginseng-diggers, known as "blackmen", in the forests and mountains beyond the reach of the Manchurian authorities, so disturbed the tribal frontier areas that in 1811 the military governor of Jilin had to send troops into the mountains to drive them out. By the opening decade of the nineteenth century the sinicization of Manchuria was already irreversibly advanced. Fengtian province had for some time been essentially Han Chinese and part of China, and the military governors of Jilin and Heilongjiang, though charged with the duty of upholding the supremacy of the banner element in society, had failed to preserve the status quo. The bannermen, who lacked the industry and technical skills of the Han Chinese settlers, were concerned only with holding on to what they had. Despite repeated government measures, the bannermen were rapidly becoming pauperized, and they grew increasingly dependent upon subsidies from the Qing government. The culturally dynamic example, which more and more of them began to emulate, was that of the Han Chinese. As time went on, not only the bannermen but also many of the tribal peoples began to adopt Chinese culture and fall into the orbit of Han tastes, Han markets and Han ways of doing things. Only the cold and sparsely populated Amur basin, which had not attracted settlers from China, remained essentially outside the Chinese sphere.

At the end of the 19th century and turn of the 20th century, to counteract increasing Russian influence, the Qing dynasty abolished the existing administrative system in Manchuria (created by the bannermen) and reclassified all immigrants to the region as Han (Chinese) instead of minren (民人, civilians, non-bannermen), while replacing provincial generals with provincial governors. This reform occurred when Manchuria was a battleground between Russia and Japan. From 1902 to 1911, seventy civil administrations were created due to the increasing population of Manchuria.

After the loss of the Outer Manchuria to the Russians and the Russo-Japanese War, Manchuria was eventually turned into provinces by the late Qing government in the early 20th century, similar to Xinjiang which was converted into a province earlier. Manchuria became officially known as the "Three Northeast Provinces" (東三省), and the Qing established the post of Viceroy of the Three Northeast Provinces to oversee these provinces, which was the only Qing viceroy that had jurisdiction outside China proper.

== See also ==
- Manchuria under Yuan rule
- Manchuria under Ming rule
- Qing dynasty in Inner Asia
- Mongolia under Qing rule
- Xinjiang under Qing rule
- Tibet under Qing rule
- Taiwan under Qing rule
- History of Manchuria
