= Liaoyang (Yuan province) =

Aspect of East Asian history

Liaoyang 遼陽等處行中書
- Province of Yuan dynasty
- 1271–1368
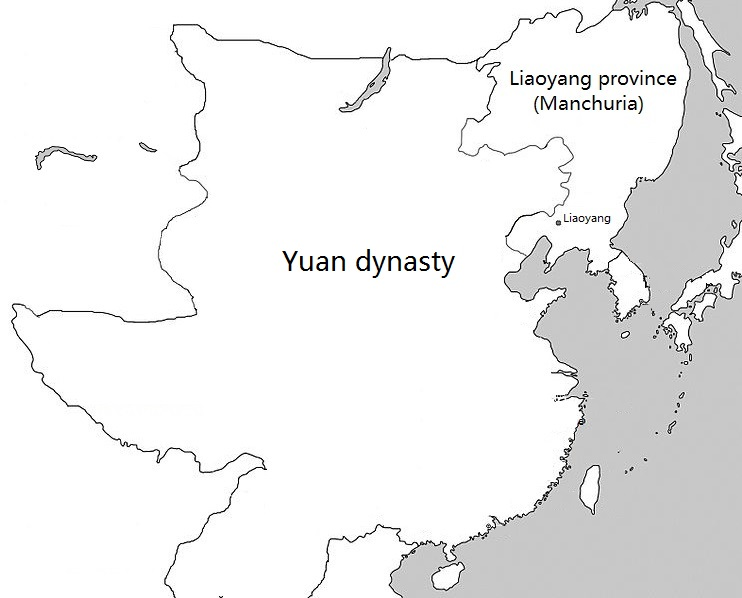
- Liaoyang in the Yuan dynasty
- Capital: Yizhou
  - Type: Yuan hierarchy
- History
  - Established: 1271
  - Disestablished: 1368
  - Ming campaign against the Uriankhai: 1387
Preceded by	Succeeded by
Mongol Empire	Northern Yuan dynasty; Ming dynasty
- Today part of: China; Russia; North Korea

The Yuan dynasty ruled over Manchuria, corresponding to modern Manchuria (Northeast China) and Outer Manchuria (including Sakhalin), from 1271 to 1368. Mongol rule over Manchuria was established after the Mongol Empire's conquest of the Jin dynasty and the Eastern Xia dynasty in the early 13th century. It became a part of the Yuan dynasty of China led by Kublai Khan in 1271. During the Yuan, it was administered as the province of Liaoyang. Even after the overthrow of the Yuan dynasty by the Ming dynasty in 1368, Manchuria was still controlled by the Northern Yuan dynasty for almost 20 years, until it was conquered by the Ming during its campaign against Naghachu and put under Ming rule.

== History ==
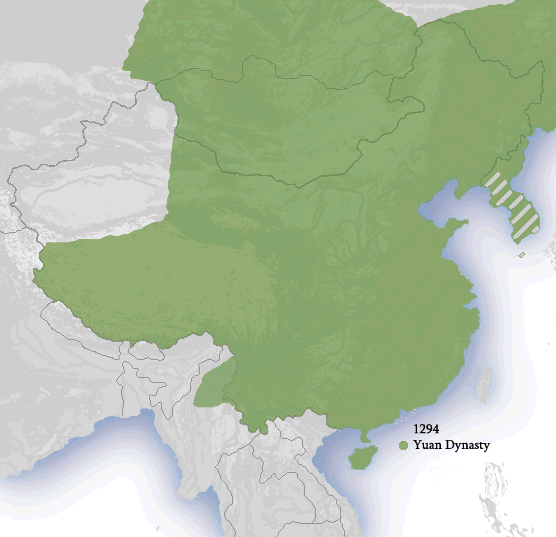
Yuan dynasty, c. 1294.

=== Conquest of Manchuria ===
In 1211, after the conquest of Western Xia, Genghis Khan, the founder of the Mongol Empire mobilized an army to conquer the Jin dynasty, which controlled much of North China including Manchuria. They successfully destroyed the Jin forts there. The Khitans under Yelü Liuge declared their allegiance to Genghis Khan and established the nominally autonomous Eastern Liao in Manchuria in 1213. However, the Jin forces dispatched a punitive expedition against them. The Mongol general Jebe went there again and pushed out the Jin force. The Jin general, Puxian Wannu, rebelled against the Jin dynasty and founded the kingdom of Eastern Xia in Dongjing (Liaoyang) in 1215. Ögedei Khan's son Güyük crushed the Eastern Xia dynasty in 1233, pacifying southern Manchuria. Some time after 1234 Ögedei also subdued the Water Tatars in the northern part of the region and began to receive falcons, harems and furs as taxation. During the conquest of Manchuria the Mongols had formed temporary alliances of convenience with many local groups, but by 1233 they had terminated many such relations and established military dominance in Manchuria.

=== Yuan rule ===
Having destroyed existing governmental structures and displaced political elites, the Mongols did not immediately establish firm control. Rather, the Mongols developed a fluid system of governance in Manchuria designed to extract economic and military resources while maintaining local stability. With the establishment of the Yuan dynasty in China by Mongol leader Kublai Khan, Manchuria became a part of the Yuan. Kublai Khan set up the Liaoyang province (遼陽行省) or Liaoyang Branch Secretariat (遼陽等處行中書省) in 1269, and the province had extended to northeastern Korean Peninsula. It became a Xuanweisi (宣慰司) in 1286. Manchuria was home to an unusual concentration of Mongol princes. The influence of these princes extended into North China and Korea. Mongol commander Nayan led a rebellion against Kublai Khan in Manchuria, a region under the direct jurisdiction of Kublai Khan, in 1287. Nayan also allied himself with Kaidu, Kublai's enemy in Central Asia and de facto ruler of the Chagatai Khanate. Kublai Khan decided to personally lead the campaign against Nayan, since he must have believed that the threat posed by the dissident leader was critical. Kublai recruited a sizable force, and despite his age and ailments, he had himself carried to the battlefield in a palanquin mounted on the backs of four elephants. In the autumn of 1287, the two sides faced each other, and later in the day the tide turned against the Nestorian Christian Nayan. Kublai captured him and had him executed.

After Nayan's defeat the Liaoyang province was re-established to govern Manchuria, and it oversaw seven circuits such as the Kaiyuan Circuit (開元路). During most of the 14th century, the capital of the Liaoyang province was located in Yizhou (懿州). It would be misleading to portray the Liaoyang province or Liaoyang Branch Secretariat as a purely civilian administration staffed by career bureaucrats. As members of the Northeast Asian elite, the Korean Hong family dominated the Liaoyang Branch Secretariat during the late 13th and the early 14th centuries. Hong Dagu headed the province in 1287 after the defeat of the Mongol princes Nayan and Qadan. When Qadan resumed his revolt and attacked the Goryeo capital of Kaesong, the Yuan Zhongshu Sheng specifically appointed Hong Dagu to pacify the region east of the Liao River and granted him wide latitude to accomplish this task. Hong Dagu's younger brother and son would later hold his post during the 1390s and 1400s (decade). Furthermore, Mongolian nobles such as Dorji also served in senior positions in the general administration in Manchuria.

Kublai Khan's efforts to restore order in the region after the revolts by Nayan and Qadan reflect the complex nature of Manchuria under the Mongols. The establishment of the Liaoyang province was part of his efforts to consolidate control over Manchuria. He also appointed such loyal generals as the Korean Hong Kun-sang to senior posts within the administration of Manchuria. Finally, Kublai Khan was careful to permit Nayan's relatives to retain his lands and privileges. The Yuan court needed the allegiance of the Mongol aristocracy as a whole even when it was forced to strike against individual members. Kublai stove to balance the interests of the Goryeo throne, local Mongol nobles, leaders of the Korean community in Manchuria, and his own court to restore order in the northeast.

During the 14th century, no open military conflict marred relations between the Yuan court and the imperial princes in Manchuria. The Liaoyang province exercised more local control than in previous decades. However, the Yuan government still felt the need to periodically dispatch special emissaries to assist officials in Manchuria in tours of inspections. In sum, the Mongol court continued to work at a balance among its own interest, Chinese populations, center-oriented local administration, and Mongol princes in the region. According to Yuanshi, the official history of the Yuan dynasty, the Mongols invaded Sakhalin and militarily subdued the Guwei (骨嵬, Gǔwéi), and by 1308, all inhabitants of Sakhalin had submitted to the Yuan dynasty. A military institution named the Zhengdong Marshal Office (征東元帥府) was established to govern the region surrounding the lower course of the Amur River and the Sakhalin. During the civil war of the Yuan dynasty known as the War of the Two Capitals after the death of Yesün Temür, Mongolian princes and high-ranking Mongolian officials based in Manchuria and eastern Mongolia fought on both sides of the war. After the Red Turban Rebellion that overthrew the Mongol Yuan dynasty by the Ming dynasty in 1368, Manchuria was still under the control of the Mongols under the Northern Yuan dynasty based in Mongolia for a while. Naghachu, an Yuan official in Manchuria since 1362, won hegemony over the Mongol tribes in the region. In 1387 the Ming sent a military campaign to attack Naghachu. The campaign concluded with the surrender of Naghachu and Manchuria was put under Ming rule.

== See also ==
- Mongol conquest of the Jin dynasty
- Manchuria under Ming rule
- Manchuria under Qing rule
- Korea under Yuan rule
- Mongolia under Yuan rule
- Tibet under Yuan rule
- Yuan dynasty in Inner Asia
- History of Manchuria
