= Manchuria =

Geographical region in Northeast Asia

Coordinates: 43°N 125°E

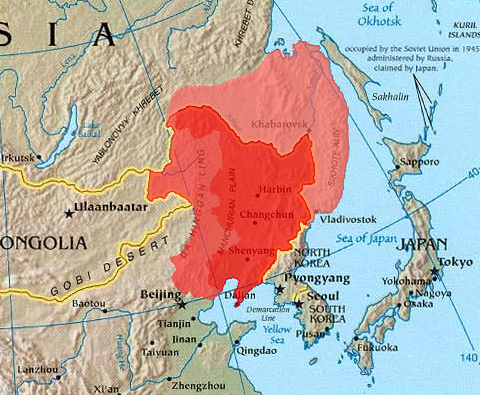
- Map of Manchuria with the central part coloured in red (northeast China); eastern Inner Mongolia to the west, in slightly lighter red; and Outer Manchuria to the north-east, in pink.

Chinese name
- Simplified Chinese: 满洲
- Traditional Chinese: 滿洲
Transcriptions
Standard Mandarin
- Hanyu Pinyin: Mǎnzhōu
- Bopomofo: ㄇㄢˇ ㄓㄡ
- Gwoyeu Romatzyh: Maanjou
- Wade–Giles: Man-chou
- Tongyong Pinyin: Mǎnjhou
- IPA: [màn.ʈʂóʊ]
Wu
- Romanization: Moe^{上}-tseu^{平}
Yue: Cantonese
- Jyutping: Mun^{5}-zau^{1}

Korean name
- Hangul: 만주
- Hanja: 滿洲
Transcriptions
- Revised Romanization: Manju
- McCune–Reischauer: Manju

Mongolian name
- Mongolian Cyrillic: Манжуур
- Mongolian script: ᠮᠠᠨᠵᠤᠤᠷ
Transcriptions
- SASM/GNC: Manjuur

Japanese name
- Kanji: 満州
- Kana: まんしゅう
Transcriptions
- Romanization: Manshū
- Kunrei-shiki: Mansyû

Manchu name
- Manchu script: ᠮᠠᠨᠵᡠ ᡤᡠᡵᡠᠨ
- Romanization: Manju Gurun

Russian name
- Russian: Маньчжурия
- Romanization: Man'chzhuriya

Manchuria is a historical region in Northeast Asia encompassing the entirety of present-day Northeast China and parts of the modern-day Russian Far East south of the Uda River and the Tukuringra-Dzhagdy ranges. The exact geographical extent varies depending on the definition: in the narrow sense, the area constituted by the three Chinese provinces of Heilongjiang, Jilin, and Liaoning as well as the northern Hebei city Chengde and the eastern Inner Mongolia cities Hulunbuir, Hinggan, Tongliao, and Chifeng; in a broader sense, historical Manchuria includes those regions plus the Amur river basin, parts of which were ceded to the Russian Empire by the Manchu-led Qing dynasty during the Amur Annexation of 1858–1860. The parts of Manchuria ceded to Russia are collectively known as Outer Manchuria or Russian Manchuria, which include present-day Amur Oblast, Primorsky Krai, the Jewish Autonomous Oblast, the southern part of Khabarovsk Krai, and the eastern edge of Zabaykalsky Krai.

The name Manchuria is an exonym (derived from the endonym "Manchu") of Japanese origin. The history of "Manchuria" (Manzhou) as a toponym in China is disputed, with some scholars believing it was never used while others believe it was by the late 19th century. The area was historically referred to by various names in the Qing dynasty such as Guandong (East of the Pass) or the Three Provinces referring to Fengtian (Liaoning), Heilongjiang, and Jilin. Manchuria as a geographical term was first used in the 18th or 19th centuries by the Japanese before spreading to Europe. The term was promoted by the Empire of Japan in support for the existence of its puppet state, Manchukuo. Although the toponym is still used, some scholars treat the term with caution or avoid it altogether due to its association with Japanese colonialism. The term is deprecated in China due to its association with Japanese imperialism and ethnic connotations. As a result, areas once considered part of Manchuria are simply referred to as the Northeast. The Three Provinces and the Northeast were also in concurrent use among the Japanese along with Manchuria until the Mukden incident of 1931.

The area is home to many ethnic groups, including the Manchus, Mongols, Koreans, Nanai, Nivkhs, and Ulchs. Many of the early ancient Koreanic kingdoms were established in the area. It is the ancestral homeland to the Tungusic-speaking Jurchens and their descendants, the Manchus.

== Boundaries ==
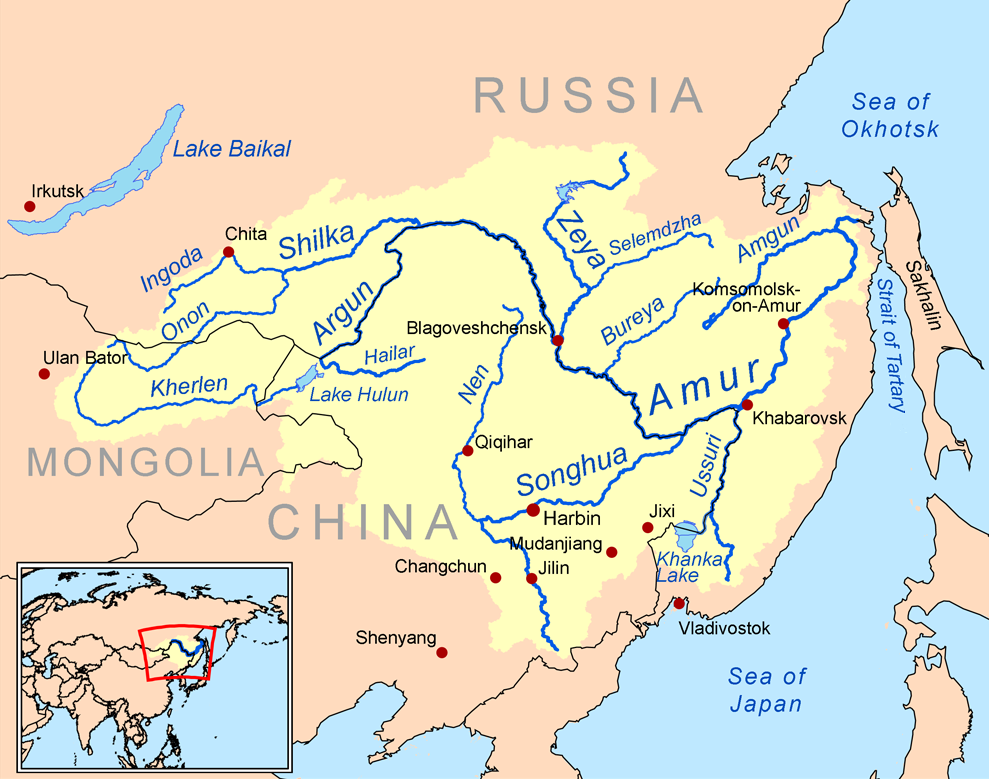
The drainage basin of the Amur River, also showing the island of Sakhalin in the east, apart to the west towards Mongolia, roughly corresponds to the geographical area of the historic land of the Manchu people

Manchuria is now most often associated with the three Chinese provinces of Heilongjiang, Jilin, and Liaoning. (Note: This is the sense used, e.g., in the World Geographical Scheme for Recording Plant Distributions.) The former Japanese puppet state of Manchukuo further included the prefectures of Chengde (now in Hebei), and Hulunbuir, Hinggan, Tongliao, and Chifeng (now in Inner Mongolia). The region of the Qing dynasty referenced as Manchuria originally further included Primorskiy Kray, the Jewish Autonomous Oblast, the southern parts of Amur Oblast and Khabarovskiy Kray, and a corner of Zabaykalʼskiy Kray. These districts were acknowledged as Qing territory by the 1689 Treaty of Nerchinsk but ceded to the Russian Empire due to the Amur Annexation in the unequal 1858 Treaty of Aigun and 1860 Convention of Beijing (the People's Republic of China indirectly questioned the legitimacy of these treaties in the 1960s, but settled border with Russia 2001 Sino-Russian Treaty of Friendship; a minor exchange nonetheless occurred in 2004 at the confluence of the Amur and Ussuri rivers). Various senses of Greater Manchuria sometimes further include Sakhalin Island, which despite its lack of mention in treaties was shown as Qing territory on period Chinese, Japanese, Russian, and French maps of the area.

The drainage basin of the Amur River apart to the east towards Mongolia roughly corresponds to the geographical area of the historic land of the Manchu people. The northern boundary was marked by mountains.

== Names ==
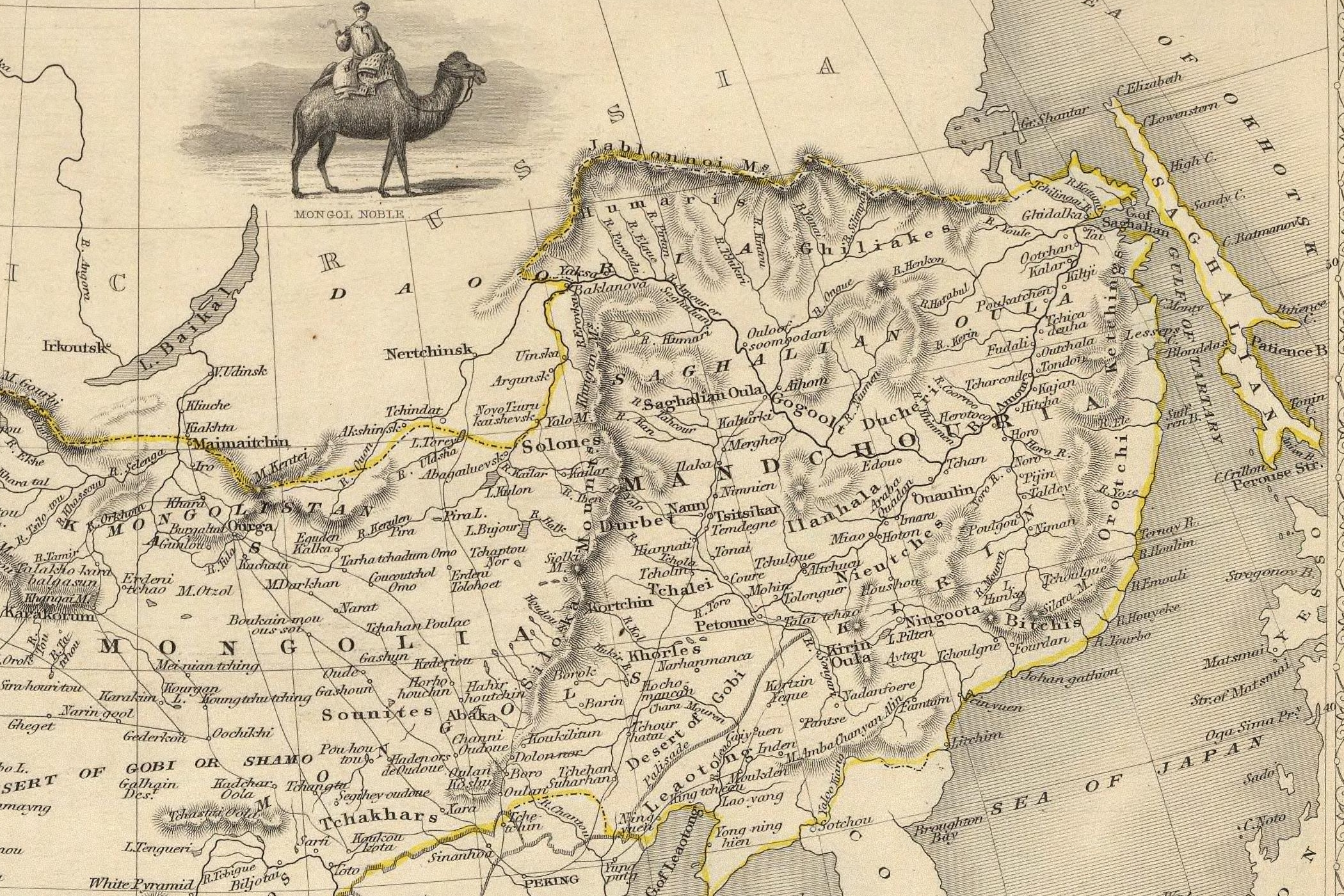
One of the earliest European maps using the term "Manchuria" (Mandchouria) (John Tallis, 1851). Previously, the term "Chinese Tartary" had been commonly applied in the West to Manchuria and Mongolia

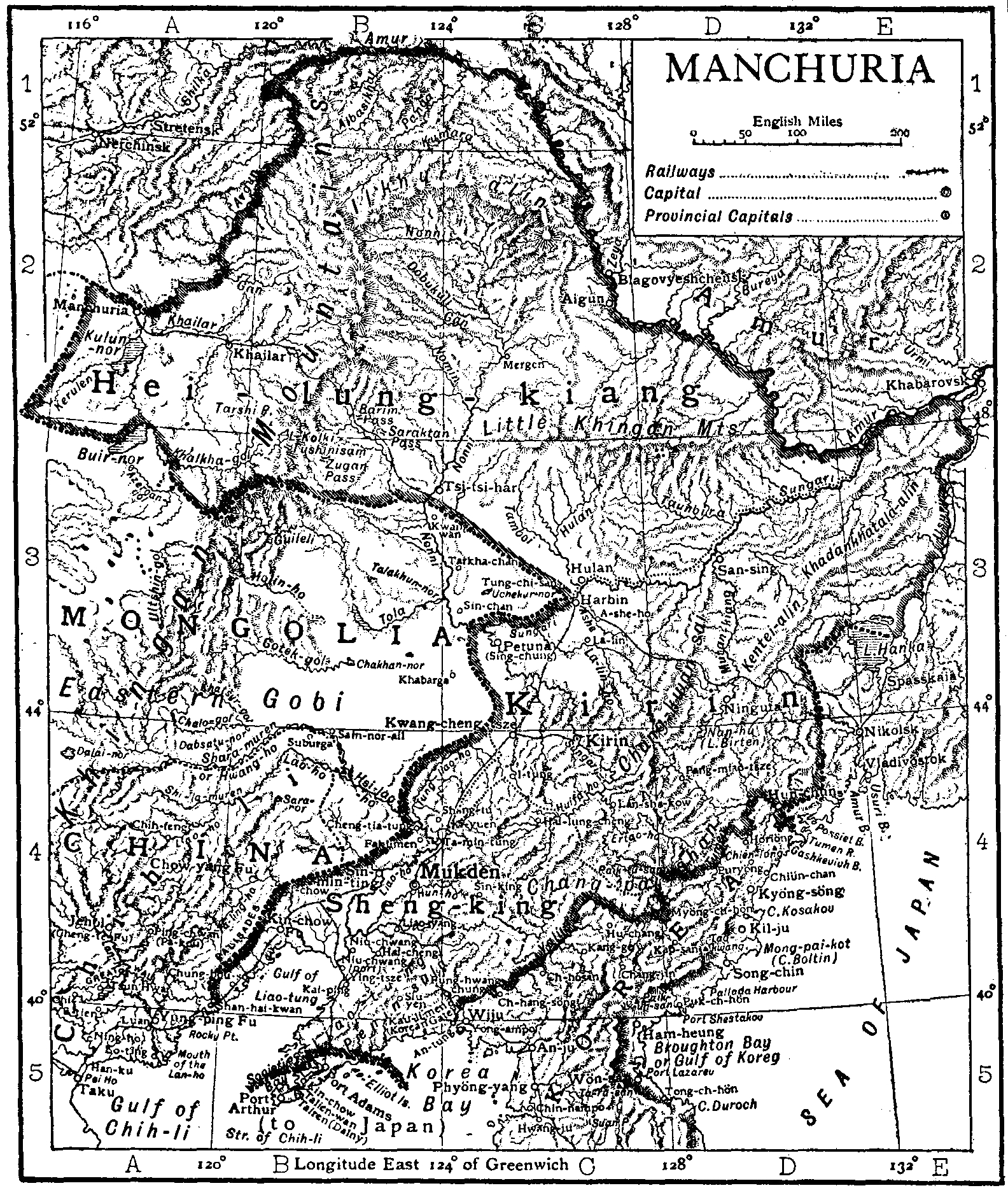
Map of the three provinces of Northeast China (1911)

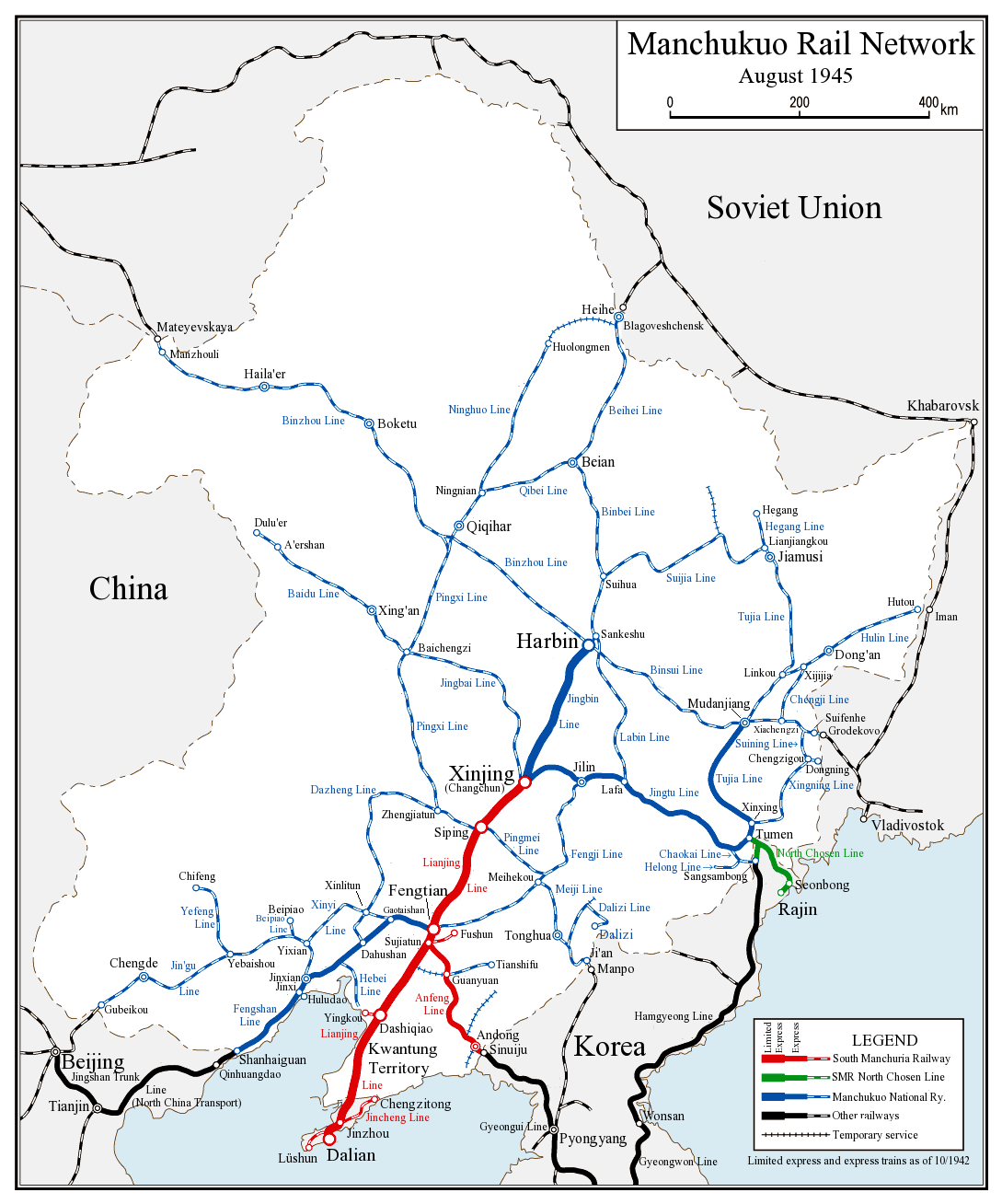
Map of Manchukuo and its rail network, c. 1945

=== Manchuria ===
==== Origins ====
The geographical term "Manchuria" was first used in the 18th or 19th century by the Japanese. "Manchuria" – variations of which arrived in European languages through Dutch – is a calque of Latin of the Japanese placename Manshū (満州, "Region of the Manchus"), which dates from the 18th century.

According to the American researcher Mark C. Elliott, the term Manshū first appeared as a placename in Katsuragawa Hoshū's 1794 work Hokusa Bunryaku in two maps, "Ashia zenzu" and "Chikyū hankyū sōzu", which were also created by Katsuragawa. According to Junko Miyawaki-Okada, Japanese geographer Takahashi Kageyasu was the first to use the term Manshū as a toponym in 1809 in the Nippon Henkai Ryakuzu, and it was from that work that Westerners adopted the name. By the 1830s, various Indo-European forms of Manshū could be found. However, according to Li Narangoa, the term was introduced to Japan in the 18th century through European maps following Jesuit conventions.

Manshū then increasingly appeared on maps by Japanese cartographers such as Kondi Jūzō, Takahashi Kageyasu, Baba Sadayoshi, and Yamada Ren. Their maps were brought to Europe by Philipp Franz von Siebold. According to Japanese scholar Nakami Tatsuo, Siebold was the one who brought the usage of the term Manchuria to Europeans after borrowing it from the Japanese, who were the first to use it in a geographic manner in the 18th century.

==== China ====
The history of the use of "Manchuria" as a toponym in China is uncertain. According to one stream of thought, it was not used by the Manchus or the Chinese. The name Manchu was given to the Jurchen people by Hong Taiji in 1635 as a new name for their ethnic group. However, neither the name Manchu or the Chinese rendering of Manshū as Manzhou ever acquired geographical connotations, while in Japanese, both Manchuria and Manchu are rendered as Manshū. According to Nakami Tatsuo, Manzhou was used to refer to Manchu people or one of their states rather than a region: "Originally, Manzhou was the name of the Manchu people or of their state; it was not the name of a region. In fact, neither Manchus nor Han Chinese have ever called China's Northeast 'Manzhou'." Even advocates of an independent Manchuria such as Inaba Iwakichi acknowledged this.

In 1912, British diplomat and sinologist Herbert Giles stated in China and the Manchus that "'Manchuria' is unknown to the Chinese or to the Manchus themselves as a geographical expression". According to Owen Latimore, during his travels in China during the late 1920s, he found "no single Chinese name for Manchuria as a unit". Historical geographer Philippe Forêt concurred, noting that there is no word for Manchuria in either Chinese or Manchu languages.

Another perspective delineated by scholars such as Mark C. Elliott and Li Narangoa argues that Manchu consciousness of their homeland as a unique place contributed to the creation of Manchuria as a distinct geographical entity, and that "Manchuria" (Manzhou) was used as a toponym by the Chinese by the late 19th century. According to Elliott, the Manchu imperial lineage believed that their original homeland was the Changbai Mountains. The Qing court endeavored to create a regional identity focused on the Changbai Mountains, which gradually became a symbol of Manchu identity. However, it is uncertain whether that notion was shared among ordinary Manchus, and there is evidence that part of that effort was to combat widespread acculturation among Manchus, resulting in the loss of their language. As part of this effort, Jesuits were commissioned to create maps that enhanced Manchu conceptualization of their homeland, which Elliot believes to have been the original impetus to label the region as Manchuria in European and Japanese maps. In 1877, Manzhou was used as a toponym in an essay by Gong Chai, a scholar from Ningbo. The description of Manzhou located it to the northeast of Beijing and identified it as the birthplace of the dynasty. Manzhou was used as a place name again 20 years later by Qing officials. Manzhou began to appear on Chinese maps in the first decade of the 1900s. Maps that used Manzhou were in the minority during the early Republican period but the name remained in common use among the Chinese Communist Party into the 1930s. Names for the region were relatively fluid before the Mukden Incident of 1931, after which alternative names in Japanese were discarded for Manshū, and Dongbei (Northeast) and Dongsansheng (Three Eastern Provinces) became the orthodox names for the Chinese. According to Mark Gamsa, Manzhou was not widely used among the Chinese but the People's Republic of China disapproved of it regardless. By the 1950s, Manzhou had virtually disappeared as a toponym although some still used it out of habit.

==== Japan ====
The term Manchuria has been described as "controversial" or "troublesome" by several scholars including Mark C. Elliott, Norman Smith, and Mariko Asano Tamanoi. The historian Norman Smith wrote that "The term 'Manchuria' is controversial" based on reasons outlined by Mariko Asano Tamanoi in the "Introduction" of Crossed Histories: Manchuria in the Age of Empire (2005). According to Tamanoi, "'Manchuria' is a product of Japanese imperialism, and to call the area Manzhou is to accept uncritically a Japanese colonial legacy." Japan used the name "Manchuria" to convey the idea of a contested region distinct from China while China insisted on its ownership of the region by rejecting the name "Manchuria". Japanese colonists who returned to Japan from Manchukuo in the post-war period used terms such as Manshu (Manchuria), Man-mō (Manchuria-Mongolia), and Mō-man (Mongolia-Manchuria) almost interchangeably. Hyphenated terms such as Man-sēn (Manchuria and Korea) and Man-mō (Manchuria-Mongolia) emerged in Japanese media and traveler writings during the first three decades of the 20th century, implying that these regions were extensions of each other. Tamanoi notes that the name "Manchuria" cannot be found on Chinese maps and acknowledged that she "should use the term in quotation marks" even though she did not.

Historian Bill Sewell denies that Manchuria is "a genuine geographic term", claiming the Japanese never viewed Manchuria as a discrete entity and it was Europeans who first started using the name Manchuria to refer to the location. Others such as Forêt described Manchuria as a solely geographical term without indicating a political connection and used it in that capacity despite acknowledging its imperialistic overtones. The historian Gavan McCormack agreed with Robert H. G. Lee's statement that "The term Manchuria or Man-chou is a modern creation used mainly by westerners and Japanese", with McCormack writing that the term Manchuria is imperialistic in nature and has no "precise meaning" since the Japanese deliberately promoted the use of "Manchuria" as a geographic name to promote its separation from China at the time they were setting up their puppet state of Manchukuo. In the 1920s, Japanese media still presented Manchuria as part of China, albeit as a distinct region, and sometimes called it the "Garden of China". However, in 1932, the puppet state of Manchukuo was founded covering not only the northeastern three provinces but also parts of eastern Inner Mongolia. In 1933, the Bureau of Information and the Publicity Department of Foreign Affairs of the Manchukuo Government published a Handbook of Information of Manchukuo stating that Manchuria did not belong to China, had its own history and traditions, and was the home of the Manchus and Mongols. Elliot notes that one scholar considered the use of "Manchuria" as not only inaccurate but giving approval to Japanese colonialism.

=== Nurgan ===
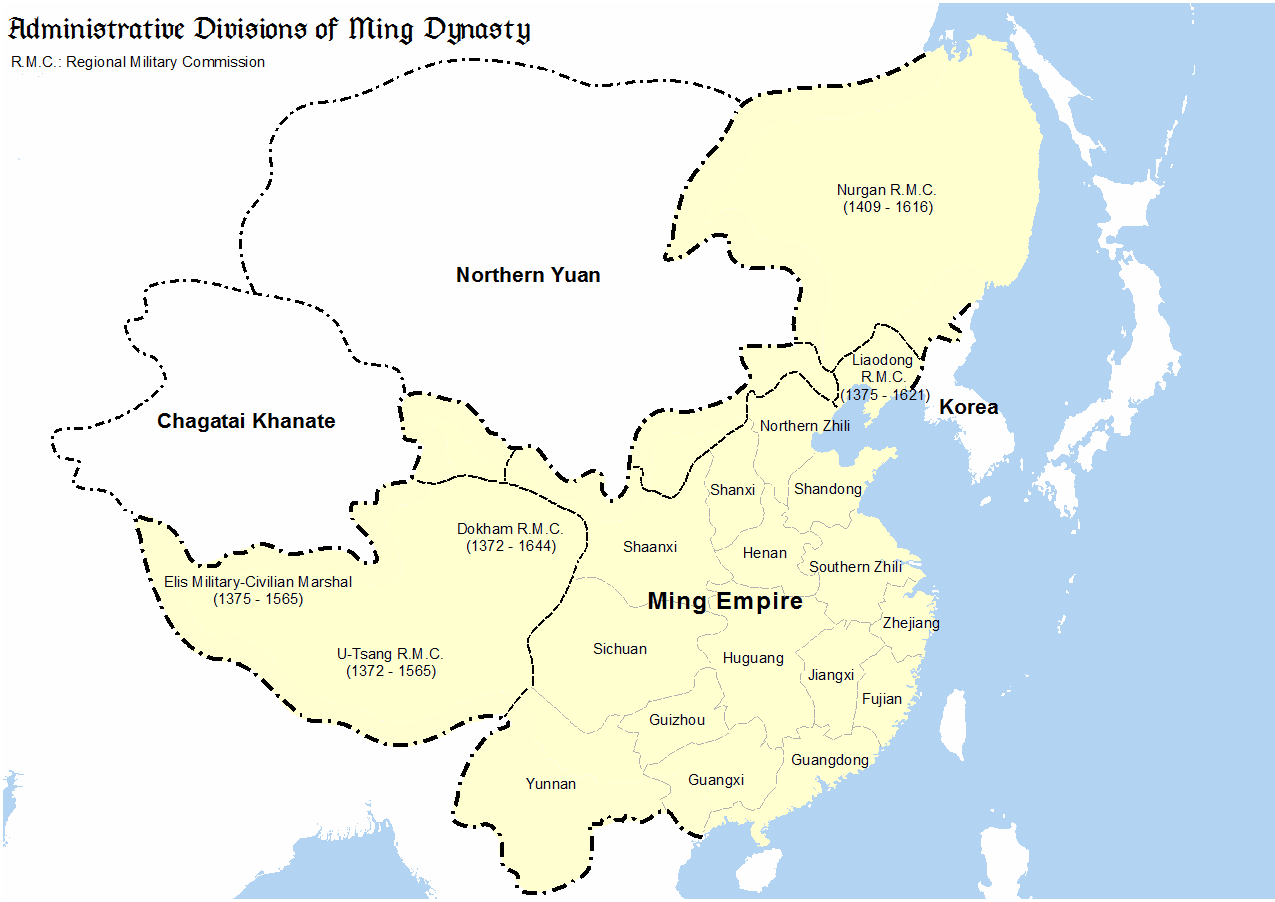
Nurgan, the Ming dynasty name for the region that was inhabited by Jurchens

During the Ming dynasty the area in which the Jurchens lived was referred to as Nurgan.

=== Three Provinces ===
During the Qing dynasty, the region was known as the "three eastern provinces" (東三省; 东三省; Dōngsānshěng; Manchu ᡩᡝᡵᡤᡳ
ᡳᠯᠠᠨ
ᡤᠣᠯᠣ, Dergi Ilan Golo), which referred to Jilin, Heilongjiang, and Fengtian since 1683 when Jilin and Heilongjiang were separated. However, Jilin and Heilongjiang did not receive the full function of provinces until 1907. The Japanese also used the name "Three Eastern Provinces" (Tōsanshō) during the 1920s and 1930s along with Manshū. However, after the Manchurian Incident of 1931, Tōsanshō was completely replaced by Manshū in Japanese usage while the Three Provinces and Northeast became the orthodox name for the same region in Chinese usage.

=== Guandong ===
Manchuria has been referred to as Guandong (關東; 关东; Guāndōng), which literally means "east of the pass", and similarly Guanwai (關外; 关外; Guānwài; 'outside the pass'), a reference to Shanhai Pass in Qinhuangdao in today's Hebei, at the eastern end of the Great Wall of China. This usage is seen in the expression Chuǎng Guāndōng (literally "Rushing into Guandong") referring to the mass migration of Han Chinese to Manchuria in the 19th and 20th centuries. The name Guandong later came to be used more narrowly for the area of the Kwantung Leased Territory on the Liaodong Peninsula. It is not to be confused with the southern province of Guangdong.

=== Northeast Region ===
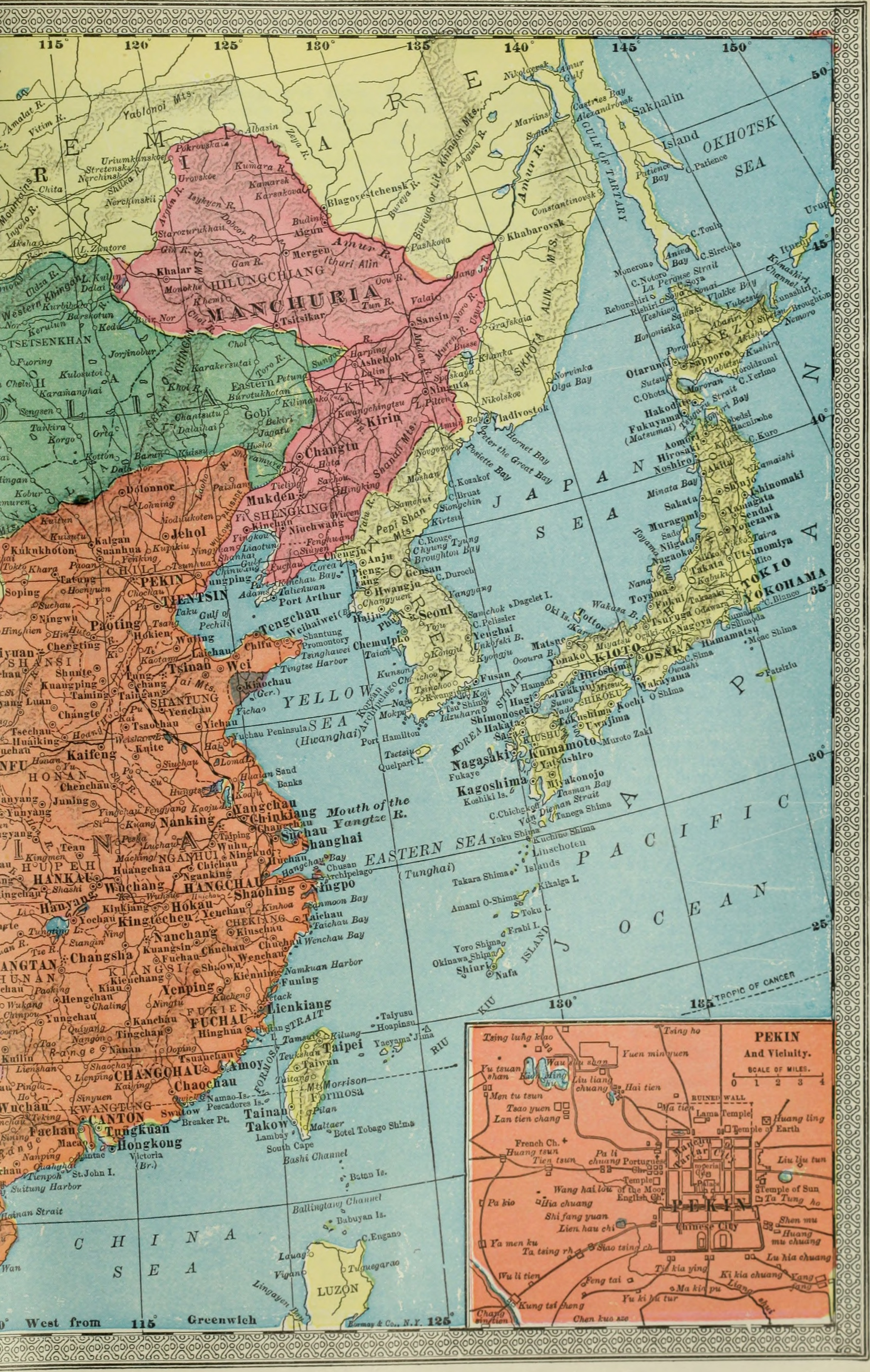
1900s map of Manchuria, in pink

The term "Manchuria" is deprecated among people of the People's Republic of China (PRC) due to its association with Japanese imperialism, the puppet state of Manchukuo of the Empire of Japan, and Manchurian nationalism. Official state documents use the term Northeast Region (东北; Dōngběi) to describe the region, and an inhabitant of the Northeast is a "Northeasterner" (东北人; Dōngběirén). It is usually restricted to the "Three East Provinces" or "Three Northeast Provinces", excluding northeastern Inner Mongolia. The Northeast (Tōhoku) was also used as a name for Manchuria by the Japanese during the 1920s and 1930s.

Northeast China is predominantly occupied by Han Chinese due to internal Chinese migrations and Sinicization of the Manchus, especially during the Qing dynasty. It is considered the original homeland of several historical groups besides the Manchus, including the Yemaek, the Xianbei, the Shiwei, and the Khitans. The area is also home to many Mongols and Hui.

== Geography and climate ==
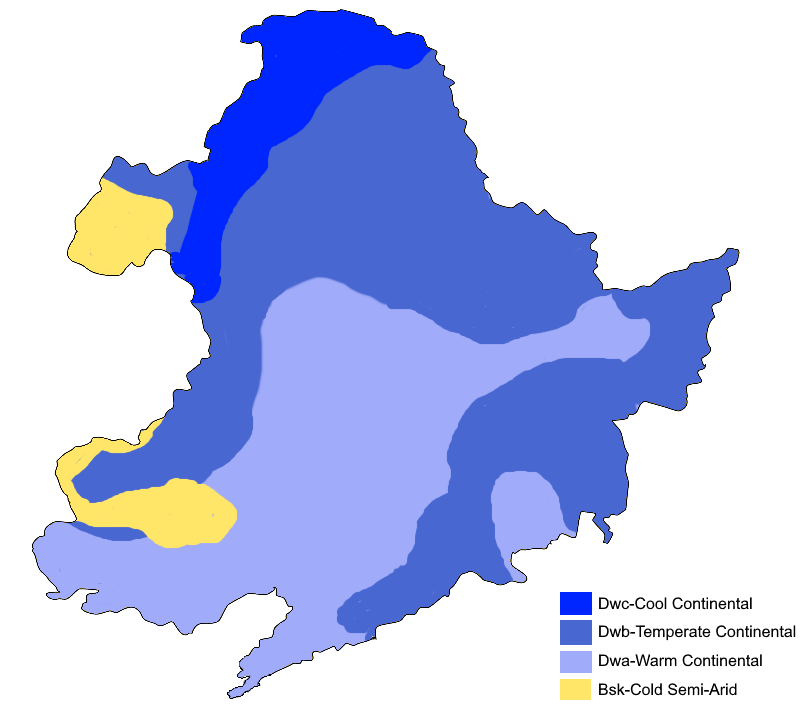
Climate map of Manchuria or Northeast China.

Manchuria consists mainly of the northern side of the funnel-shaped North China Craton, a large area of tilled and overlaid Precambrian rocks spanning 100 million hectares (250 million acres). The North China Craton was an independent continent before the Triassic period and is known to have been the northernmost piece of land in the world during the Carboniferous. The Greater Khingan in the west is a Jurassic mountain range formed by the collision of the North China Craton with the Siberian Craton, which marked the final stage of the formation of the supercontinent Pangaea.

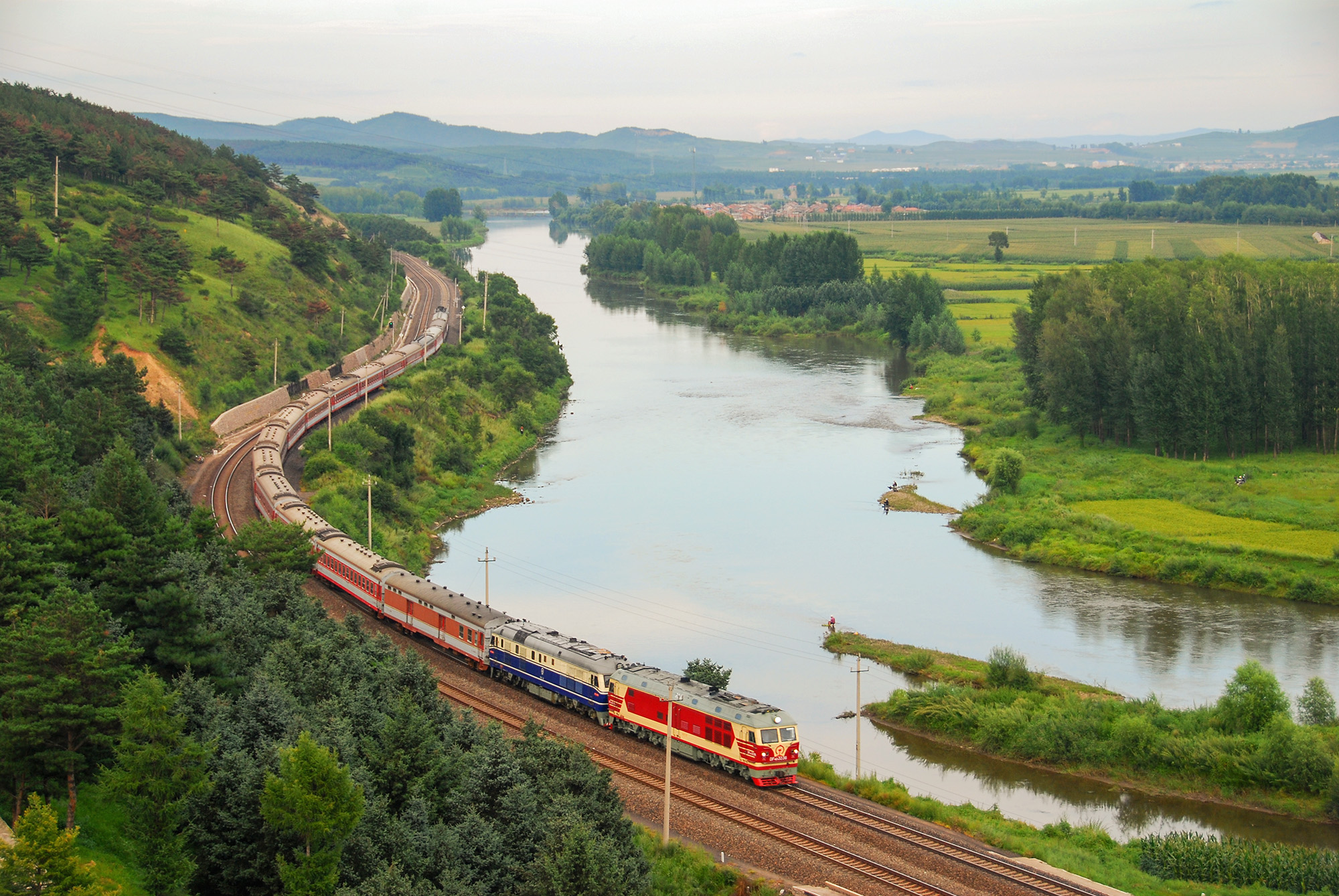
Hailang River near Hailin City in Heilongjiang

No part of Manchuria was glaciated during the Quaternary, but the surface geology of most of the lower-lying and more fertile parts of Manchuria consists of very deep layers of loess, which have been formed by the wind-borne movement of dust and till particles formed in glaciated parts of the Himalayas, Kunlun Mountains and Tian Shan, as well as the Gobi and Taklamakan Deserts. Soils are mostly fertile mollisols and fluvents except in the more mountainous parts where they have poorly developed orthents, as well as in the extreme north where permafrost occurs and orthels dominate.

The climate of Manchuria has extreme seasonal contrasts, ranging from humid, almost tropical heat in summer to windy, dry, Arctic cold in winter. This pattern occurs because the position of Manchuria on the boundary between the great Eurasian continental landmass and the huge Pacific Ocean causes complete monsoonal wind reversal.

In summer, when the land heats faster than the ocean, low-pressure forms over Asia and warm, moist south to southeasterly winds bring heavy, thundery rain, yielding annual rainfall ranging from 400 mm (16 in), or less in the west, to over 1,150 mm (45 in) in the Changbai Mountains. Temperatures in summer are very warm to hot, with July average maxima ranging from 31 °C (88 °F) in the south to 24 °C (75 °F) in the extreme north.

In winter, however, the vast Siberian High causes very cold, north-to-northwesterly winds that bring temperatures as low as −5 °C (23 °F) in the extreme south and −30 °C (−22 °F) in the north where the zone of discontinuous permafrost reaches northern Heilongjiang. However, because the winds from Siberia are exceedingly dry, snow falls only on a few days every winter, and it is never heavy. This explains why corresponding latitudes of North America were fully glaciated during glacial periods of the Quaternary while Manchuria, though even colder, always remained too dry to form glaciers – a state of affairs enhanced by stronger westerly winds from the surface of the ice sheet in Europe.

== History ==
=== Early history ===
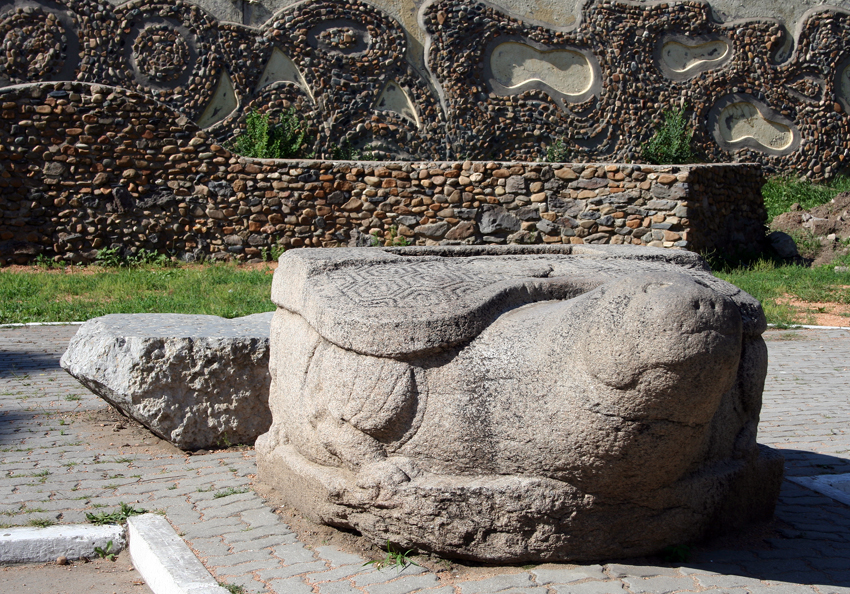
A 12th-century Jurchen stone tortoise in today's Ussuriysk

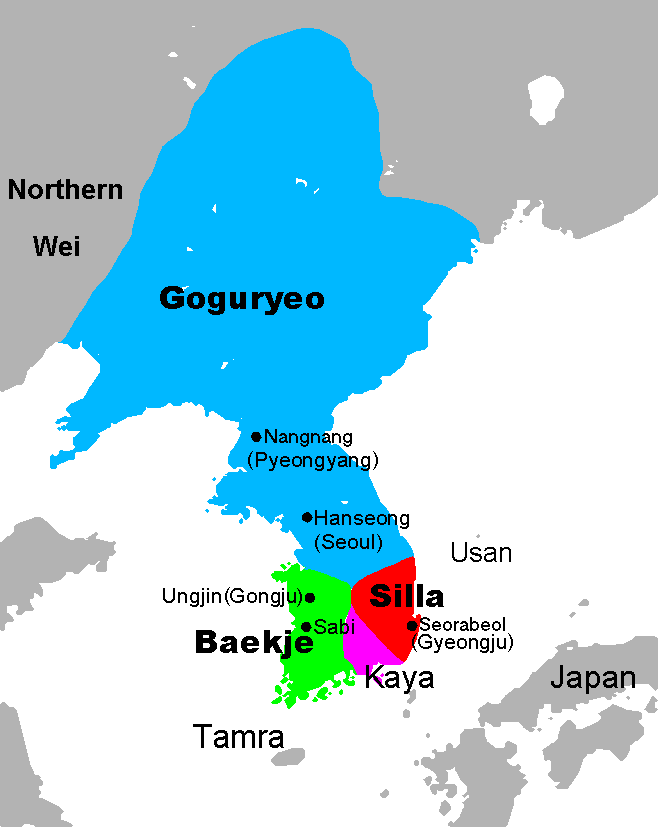
The Three Kingdoms of Korea occupied roughly half of Manchuria, 5th century AD

Manchuria was the homeland of several ethnic groups, including Manchu, Mongols, Koreans, Nanai, Nivkhs, Ulchs. Various ethnic groups and their respective kingdoms, including the Sushen, Donghu, Xianbei, Wuhuan, Mohe, Khitan and Jurchens, have risen to power in Manchuria. Koreanic kingdoms such as Gojoseon (before 108 BCE), Buyeo (2nd century BCE to 494 CE) and Goguryeo (37 BCE to 688 CE) also became established in large parts of this area. The Chinese Qin (221–206 BCE), Han (202 BCE–9 CE and 25 CE–220 CE), Cao Wei (220–266), Western Jin (266–316), and Tang (618–690 and 705–907) dynasties controlled parts of Manchuria. Parts of northwestern Manchuria came under the control of the First Turkic Khaganate of 552–603 and of the Eastern Turkic Khaganate of 581–630. Early Manchuria had a mixed economy of hunting, fishing, livestock, and agriculture.

With the Song dynasty (960–1269) to the south, the Khitan people of Inner Mongolia created the Liao dynasty (916–1125) and conquered Outer Mongolia and Manchuria, going on to control the adjacent part of the Sixteen Prefectures in Northern China as well. The Liao dynasty became the first state to control all of Manchuria.

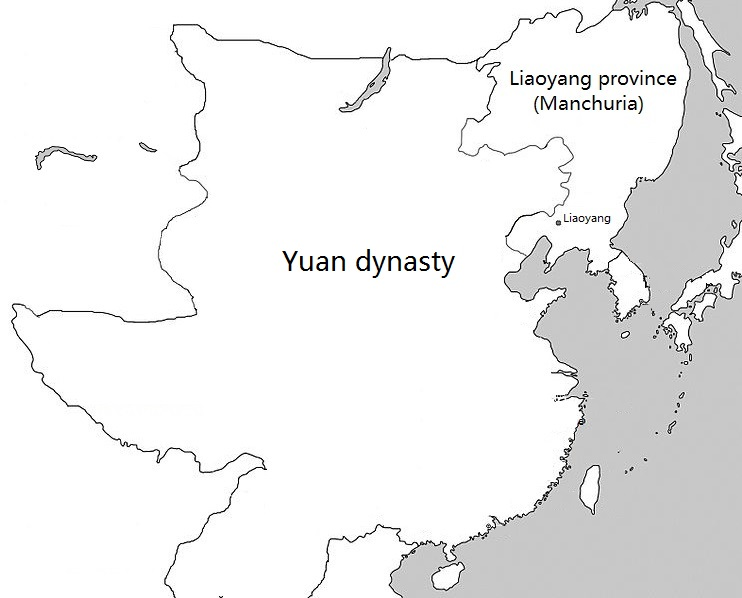
Map of Manchuria under Yuan rule in the 14th century, including province of Liaoyang and northern Korea

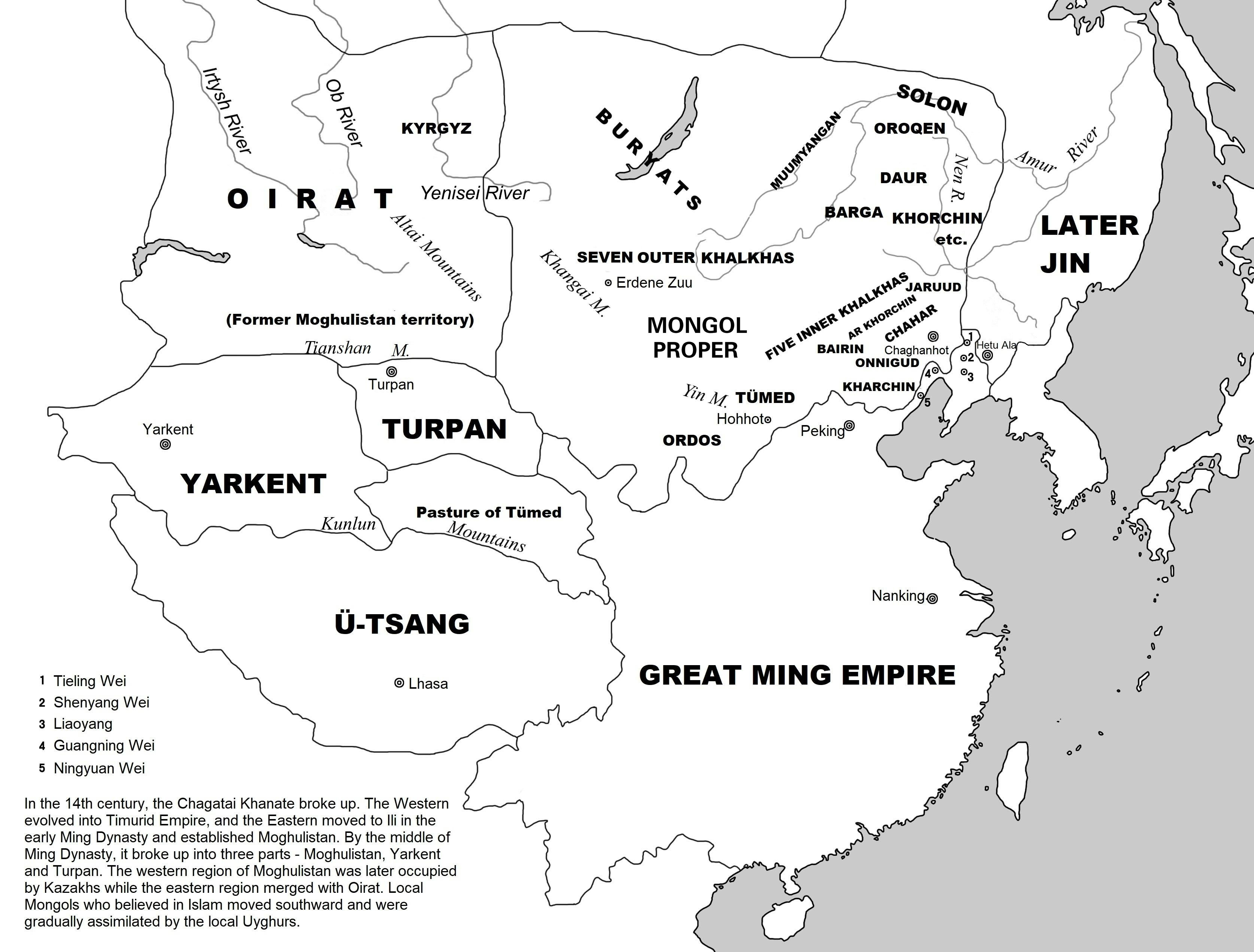
Map Manchuria under Ming rule in 1616, the homeland of the Jurchens who became the Manchus and founded Later Jin (1616–1636)

In the early 12th century, the Tungusic Jurchen people, who were Liao's tributaries, overthrew the Liao and formed the Jin dynasty (1115–1234), which went on to control parts of Northern China and Mongolia after a series of successful military campaigns. During the Mongol Yuan dynasty rule of China (1271–1368), Manchuria was administered as Liaoyang province. In 1375 Naghachu, a Mongol official of the Mongolia-based Northern Yuan dynasty of 1368–1635 in Liaoyang province invaded Liaodong, but later surrendered to the Ming dynasty in 1387. In order to protect the northern border areas, the Ming dynasty decided to "pacify" the Jurchens in order to deal with its problems with Yuan remnants along its northern border. The Ming solidified control over Manchuria under the Yongle Emperor (r. 1402–1424), establishing the Nurgan Regional Military Commission of 1409–1435. Starting in the 1580s, a Jianzhou Jurchen chieftain, Nurhaci (1558–1626), started to unify Jurchen tribes of the region. Over the next several decades, the Jurchen took control of most of Manchuria. In 1616 Nurhaci founded the Later Jin dynasty, which later became known as the Qing dynasty. The Qing defeated the Evenk-Daur federation led by the Evenki chief Bombogor and beheaded Bombogor in 1640, with Qing armies massacring and deporting Evenkis and absorbing the survivors into the Banners.

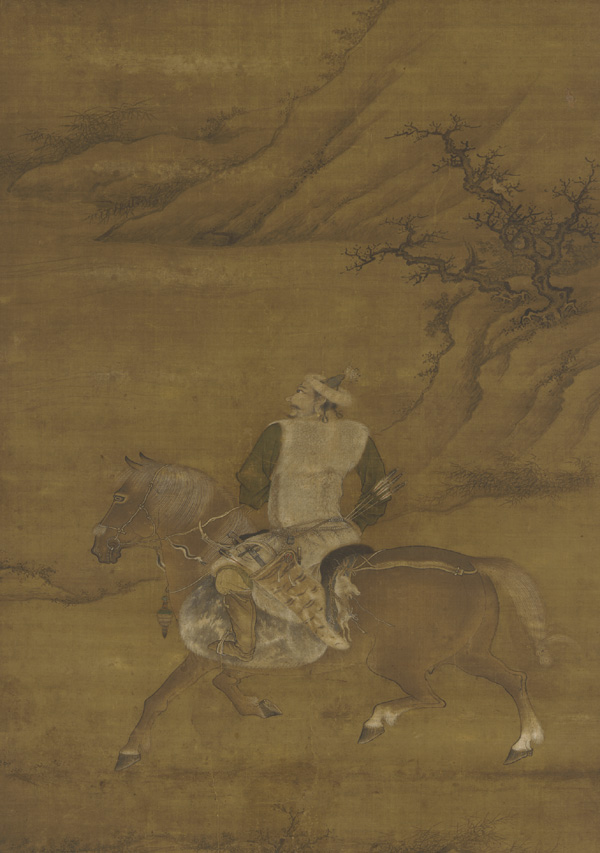
A Jurchen man hunting from his horse, from a 15th-century ink-and-color painting on silk

Chinese cultural and religious influence such as Chinese New Year, the "Chinese god", motifs such as the dragon, spirals, and scrolls, agriculture, husbandry, methods of heating, and material goods such as iron cooking-pots, silk, and cotton spread among the Amur natives including the Udeghes, Ulchis, and Nanais.

In 1644, after peasant rebels sacked the Ming dynasty's capital of Beijing, the Jurchens (now called Manchus) allied with Ming general Wu Sangui and seized control of Beijing, overthrowing the short-lived Shun dynasty (1644) and establishing Qing-dynasty rule (1644–1912) over all of China. The Manchu conquest of China involved the deaths of over 25 million people. The Qing dynasty built the Willow Palisade – a system of ditches and embankments – during the later 17th century to restrict the movement of Han civilians into Jilin and Heilongjiang. Only bannermen, including Han bannermen, were allowed to settle in Jilin and Heilongjiang. However the Willow Palisade was lightly guarded, poorly maintained, and easily crossed.

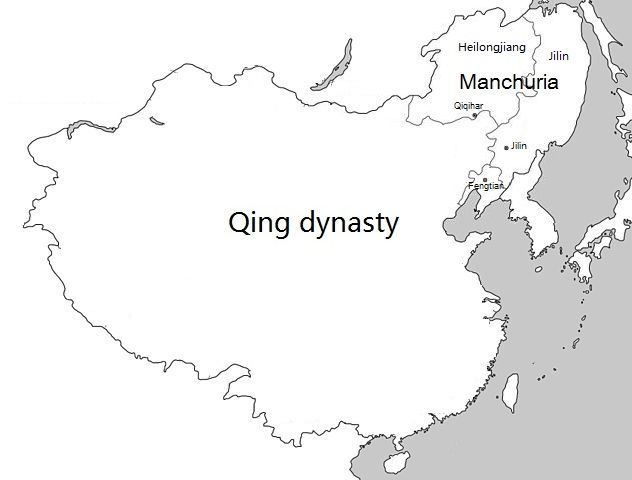
Map of Manchuria under Qing rule in 1820, including the provinces of Fengtian, Jilin and Heilongjiang

After conquering the Ming, the Qing often identified their state as "China" (中國, Zhongguo; "Middle Kingdom"), and referred to it as Dulimbai Gurun ("Middle Kingdom") in Manchu. In the Qing shilu the lands of the Qing state (including Manchuria and present-day Xinjiang, Mongolia, and Tibet) are thus identified as "the Middle Kingdom" in both the Chinese and Manchu languages in roughly two-thirds of the cases, while the term refers to the traditional Chinese provinces populated by the Han in roughly one third of the cases. It was also common to use "China" (Zhongguo, Dulimbai gurun) to refer to the Qing in official documents, international treaties, and foreign affairs. In diplomatic documents, the term "Chinese language" (Dulimbai gurun i bithe) referred to the Chinese, Manchu, and Mongol languages, and the term "Chinese people" (中國人 Zhongguo ren; Manchu: Dulimbai gurun i niyalma) referred to all Han, Manchus, and Mongol subjects of the Qing. The Qing explicitly stated that the lands in Manchuria belonged to "China" (Zhongguo, Dulimbai gurun) in Qing edicts and in the 1689 Treaty of Nerchinsk.

=== Population change ===
The Manchu rulers of the Qing dynasty initially prohibited Han Chinese from settling in the region. In 1668 the Qing forbade Han people from migrating into Manchuria and in 1681 the Willow Palisade, a barrier of trees and ditches, was erected to mark the boundary of migration and settlement. Despite this restriction, a constant flow of Han Chinese farmers from North China settled there.

By the 18th century the Qing had decided to settle Han refugees from northern China suffering from famine, floods, and drought into Manchuria and Inner Mongolia. Manchu landlords desired Han Chinese peasants to rent their land and to grow grain; most Han Chinese migrants were not evicted as they crossed the Great Wall and Willow Palisade. The Qianlong Emperor (r. 1735–1796) made the decision to allow Han Chinese refugees to move into Manchuria despite having banned them from 1740 to 1776. These refugee farmers from north China were resettled along the Liao River in order to restore the land to cultivation. Han Chinese squatters reclaimed wasteland while others rented land from Manchu landlords. By 1780, he Han Chinese farmed 500,000 hectares of privately owned land in Manchuria, tens of thousands of hectares in Inner Mongolia, and 203,583 hectares of lands that were part of courier stations, noble estates, and Banner lands. According to one observer, by 1800, the Han Chinese made up 80 to 90 percent of the population in garrisons and towns in Manchuria.

Han Chinese then streamed into Manchuria, both illegally and legally, over the Great Wall of China and the Willow Palisade in a movement known as Chuang Guandong. Chinese tenant farmers rented or even claimed title to land from the "imperial estates" and Manchu Bannerlands in the area. Besides moving into the Liao area in southern Manchuria, Han Chinese settled the path linking Jinzhou, Fengtian, Tieling, Changchun, Hulun, and Ningguta during the Qianlong Emperor's reign, and Han Chinese had become the majority in urban areas of Manchuria by 1800. To increase the Imperial Treasury's revenue, the Qing sold formerly Manchu-only lands along the Sungari to Han Chinese at the beginning of the Daoguang Emperor's 1820–1850 reign, and Han Chinese filled up most of Manchuria's towns by the 1840s, according to Abbé Huc.

The demographic change was not caused solely by Han migration. Manchus also refused to stay in Manchuria. In the late 18th century, Manchus in Beijing were sent to Manchuria as part of a plan to reduce the burden on the court, but they tried to return by every means possible. With the exception of 20,000 to 30,000 soldiers and their families and a military colony established in the 1850s, Manchuria was devoid of Manchus. By 1900, 15 million of Manchuria's 17 million inhabitants were Han Chinese.

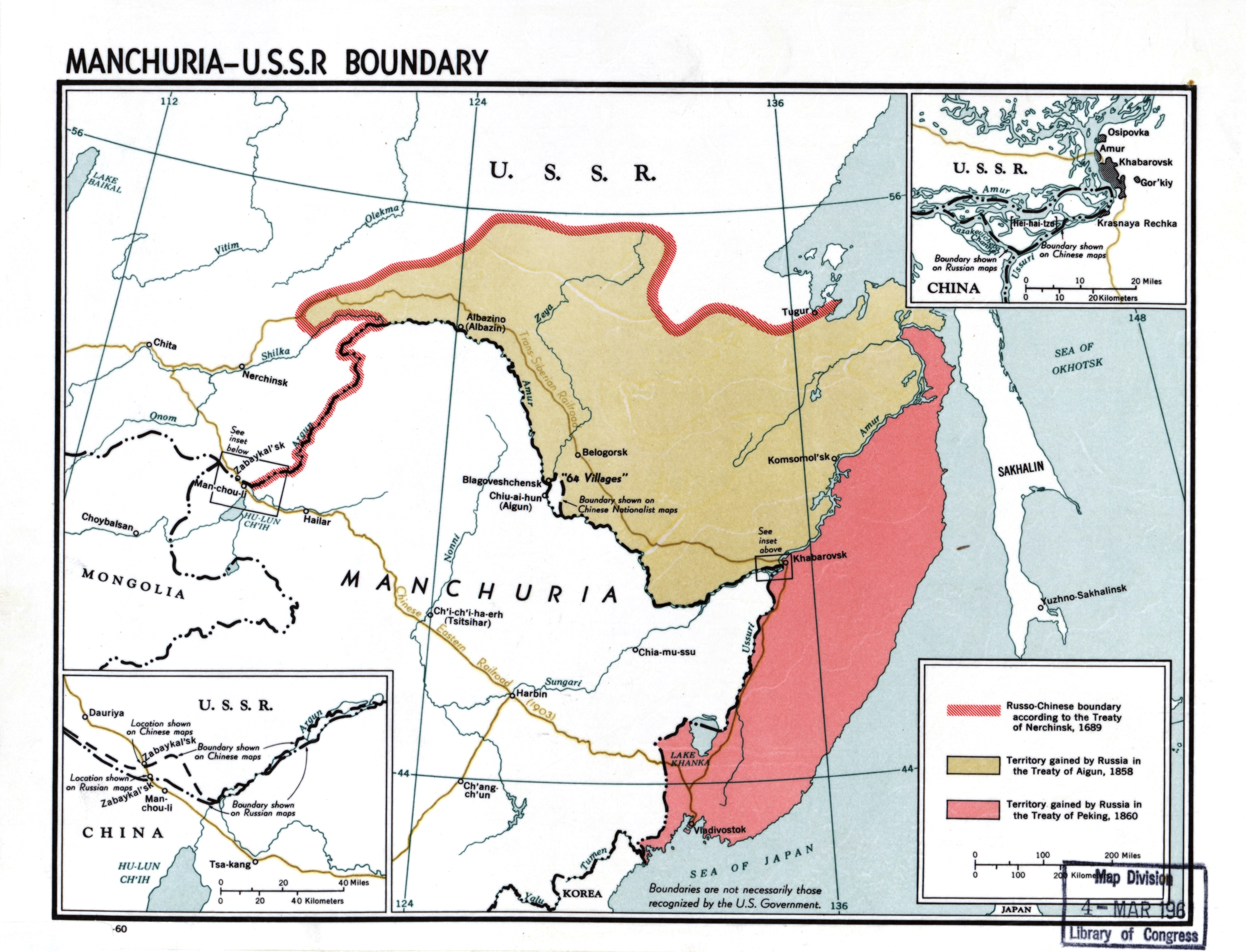
Map showing the original border (in pink) between Manchuria and Russia according to the Treaty of Nerchinsk 1689, and subsequent losses of territory to Russia in the treaties of Aigun 1858 (beige) and Peking 1860 (red)

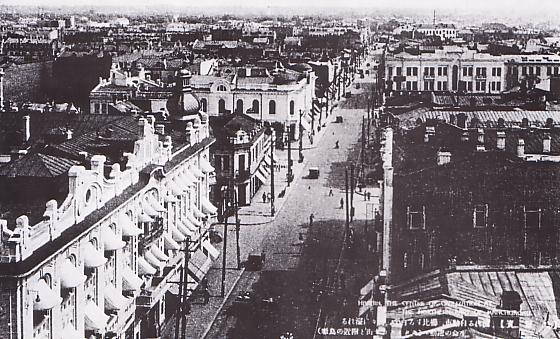
Harbin's Kitayskaya Street (Russian for "Chinese Street"), now Zhongyang Street (Chinese for "Central Street"), before 1945

=== Russian invasions ===
In 1858 Russian diplomacy forced a weakening Qing dynasty to cede Manchuria north of the Amur to Russia under the Treaty of Aigun. In 1860, with the Treaty of Peking, the Russians managed to obtain a further large slice of Manchuria, east of the Ussuri River. As a result, Manchuria became divided into a Russian half (known as Outer Manchuria or Russian Manchuria), and a remaining Chinese region (known as Manchuria). In modern literature, "Manchuria" usually refers to Manchuria in China. As a result of the Treaties of Aigun and Peking, Qing China lost access to the Sea of Japan.

=== History after 1860 ===
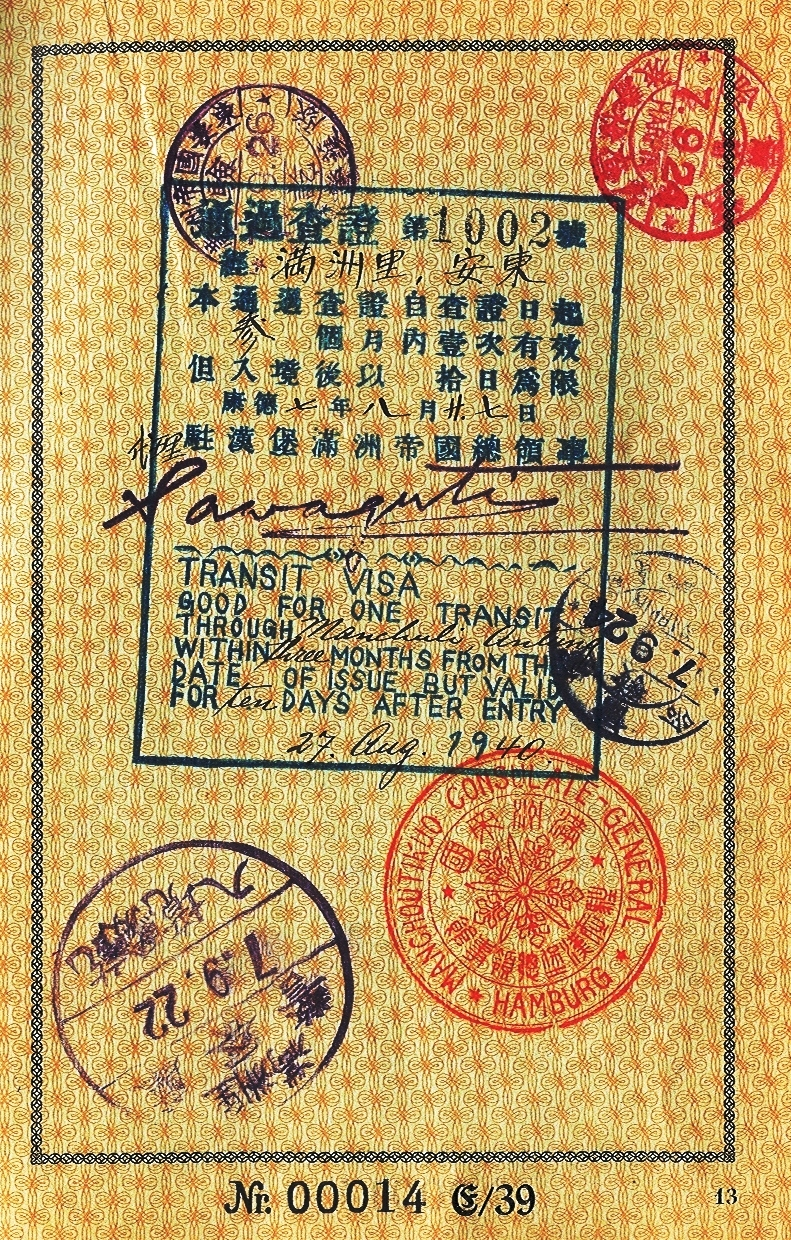
1940 Manchukuo visa issued at Hamburg

To counter the increasing influence of Meiji era Japan in the region, the Qing granted Russia the right to construct railways in Manchuria, including the Chinese Eastern Railway in 1896.

In the Chuang Guandong movement, many Han farmers, mostly from the Shandong peninsula moved there. By 1921, Harbin, northern Manchuria's largest city, had a population of 300,000, including 100,000 Russians. Japan replaced Russian influence in the southern half of Manchuria as a result of the Russo-Japanese War in 1904–1905. Most of the southern branch of the Chinese Eastern Railway was transferred from Russia to Japan, and became the South Manchurian Railway. Japanese influence extended into Outer Manchuria in the wake of the Russian Revolution of 1917, but Outer Manchuria had reverted to Soviet control by 1925. Manchuria was an important region due to its rich natural resources including coal, fertile soil, and various minerals. For pre–World War II Japan, Manchuria was an essential source of raw materials. Without occupying Manchuria, the Japanese probably could not have carried out their plan for conquest over Southeast Asia or taken the risk of attacking the United States and the British Empire in 1941.

There was a major epidemic known as the Manchurian plague in 1910–1911, likely caused by the inexperienced hunting of marmots, many of whom are diseased. The cheap railway transport and the harsh winters, where the hunters sheltered in close confinement, helped to propagate the disease. The response required close coordination between the Chinese, Russian and Japanese authorities and international disease experts held an 'International Plague Conference' in the northern city of Shenyang after the disease was under control to learn the lessons.

In 1915, Japan forced China to cede economic privileges in Manchuria to Japan, including concessions in Anshan.

It was reported that among Banner people, both Manchu and Chinese (Hanjun) in Aihun, Heilongjiang in the 1920s, would seldom marry with Han civilians, but they (Manchu and Chinese Bannermen) would mostly intermarry with each other. Owen Lattimore reported that during his January 1930 visit to Manchuria, he studied a community in Jilin (Kirin), where both Manchu and Chinese Bannermen were settled at a town called Wulakai, and eventually the Chinese Bannermen there could not be differentiated from Manchus since they were effectively Manjurified. The Han civilian population was in the process of absorbing and mixing with them when Lattimore wrote his article.

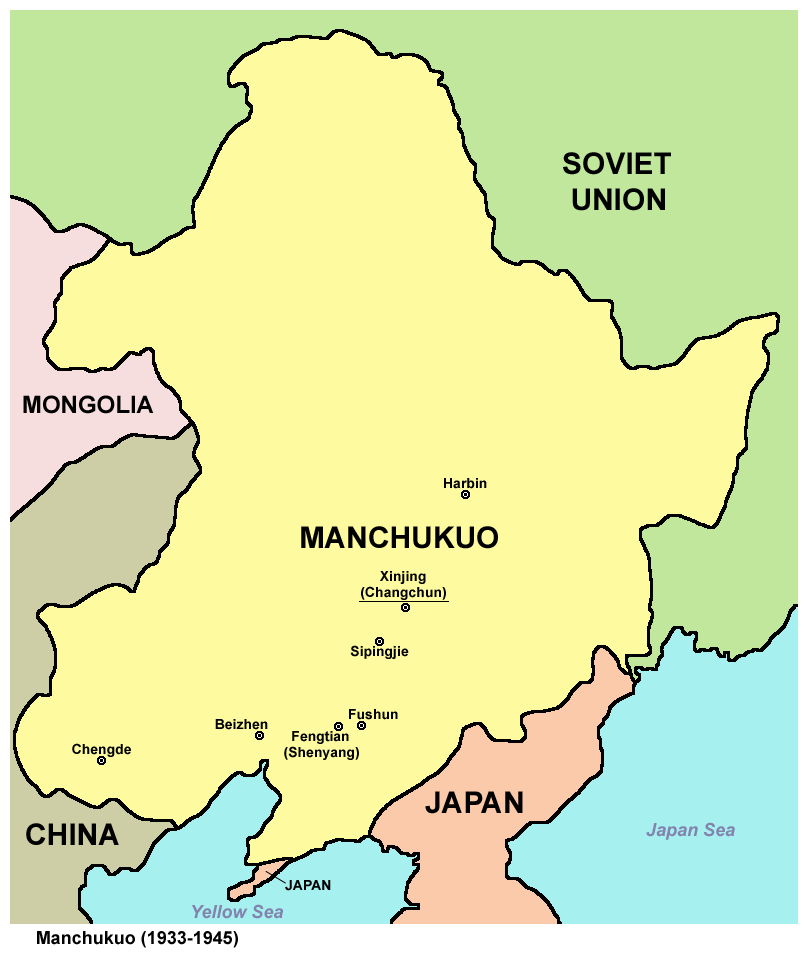
Map of Manchukuo (1933–1945)

Around the time of World War I, Zhang Zuolin established himself as a powerful warlord with influence over most of Manchuria. Zhang established an autonomous rule that nominally acknowledged the Republic of China (ROC). Japan co-opted Zhang and retained its semi-colonial economic privileges. During Zhang's rule, the Manchurian economy grew tremendously, backed by the immigration of Chinese from other parts of China. After Zhang was defeated in the Northern Expedition and retreated back to Manchuria from Beijing, Japanese army officers assassinated him on 2 June 1928, in what is known as the Huanggutun Incident. These Japanese officers sought for Japan to take direct control of Manchuria, but the Japanese government did not support the plan. Zhang's son Zhang Xueliang became Manchuria's new ruler. He directed public funds towards the development of Chinese industrial enterprises in the region.

Following the Mukden incident in 1931 and the subsequent Japanese invasion of Manchuria, the Japanese declared Manchuria an "independent state", and appointed the deposed Qing emperor Puyi as puppet emperor of Manchukuo. Under Japanese control, Manchuria was brutally run, with a systematic campaign of terror and intimidation against the local populations including arrests, organised riots and other forms of subjugation. Manchukuo was used by Japan as a base to invade the rest of China. At that time, hundreds of thousands of Japanese settlers arrived in Manchuria.

At the Yalta Conference in February 1945, Joseph Stalin agreed that the Soviet Union would declare war on Japan within three months after Germany surrendered, and the United States and United Kingdom agreed that the Soviet Union could pursue its claimed interests in Manchuria. Accordingly, in August the Soviet Union issued its declaration of war and launched the Soviet invasion of Manchuria. Soviet forces controlled Manchuria until they left in Spring 1946. Afterwards, China's Nationalist government took control of Manchuria. Soon afterwards, the Chinese Communist Party and the Nationalists started fighting for control over Manchuria. The communists won in the Liaoshen Campaign. With the encouragement of the Soviet Union, Manchuria was then used as a staging ground during the Chinese Civil War for the Chinese Communist Party, which emerged victorious in 1949. Ambiguities in the treaties that ceded Outer Manchuria to Russia led to disputes over the political status of several islands. The Kuomintang government in Taiwan (Formosa) complained to the United Nations, which passed resolution 505 on 1 February 1952, denouncing Soviet actions over the violations of the 1945 Sino-Soviet Treaty of Friendship and Alliance.

=== People's Republic of China ===
The historical region of Manchuria is composed of the provinces of Liaoning, Jilin, and Heilongjiang.

Manchuria was a central focus of China's approach to "socialist industrialization" following the founding of the People's Republic of China. Strongly influenced by the Soviet approach to industrialization, development policy focused on heavy-industry state-owned enterprises, such as Angang in Anshan. The discovery and development of Daqing oil field made Manchuria the center of China's oil industry beginning in the 1960s.

During the Third Front Construction, the region was a major supplier of staff for the newly developed industrial bases in China's interior.

The Sino-Soviet split led to the Sino-Soviet border conflict, which ultimately resulted in an agreement. In 2004, Russia agreed to transfer Yinlong Island and one half of Heixiazi Island to China, ending an enduring border dispute, and this agreement was finalized in 2008.

== See also ==
- Indigenous peoples of Siberia
- Religion in Northeast China
- Tungusic peoples
