= Tyr, Russia =

Human settlement in Ulchsky District, Khabarovsk Krai, Russia

Coordinates: 52°56′N 139°46′E

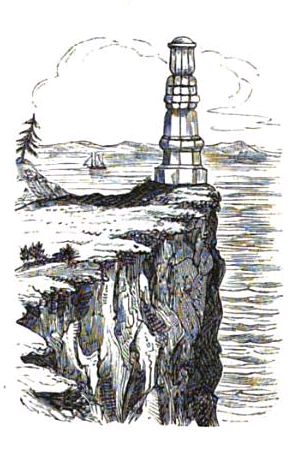
The Tyr Cliff, with a Yuan or Ming column, as seen by Russian artist Permikin in the 1850s

Tyr (Russian: Тыр) is a settlement in Ulchsky District of Khabarovsk Krai, Russia, located on the right bank of the Amur River, near the mouth of the Amgun River, about 100 kilometers (60 mi) upstream from Nikolayevsk-on-Amur.

Tyr has been known as a historically Nivkh ("Gilyak") village, since no later than the mid-19th century.

Tyr's main claim to fame is that its location had been visited by both Yuan and Ming dynasty expeditions, which sailed down the Sungari and Amur Rivers to establish a foothold in this region. Both times the visitors built temples and monuments on the spectacular Tyr Cliff south of today's settlement.

The remains of the Yuan era temple unearthed at the site by modern archaeologists date to the 1260s, while the two Ming temples, built during the Amur expeditions by the admiral eunuch Yishiha, were constructed in 1413 and 1433–1434, respectively.

The Ming dynasty stelae and a column, put at the Tyr cliff by Yishiha, could still be seen in situ by the members of Russian Amur expeditions in the 1850s, but in the late 19th century the stelae were moved to the Arsenyev Museum in Vladivostok after the Amur Annexation by the Russian Empire. A number of archaeological excavations have been conducted at the site since.
