= Korean–Jurchen border conflicts =

10th-17th century wars in East Asia

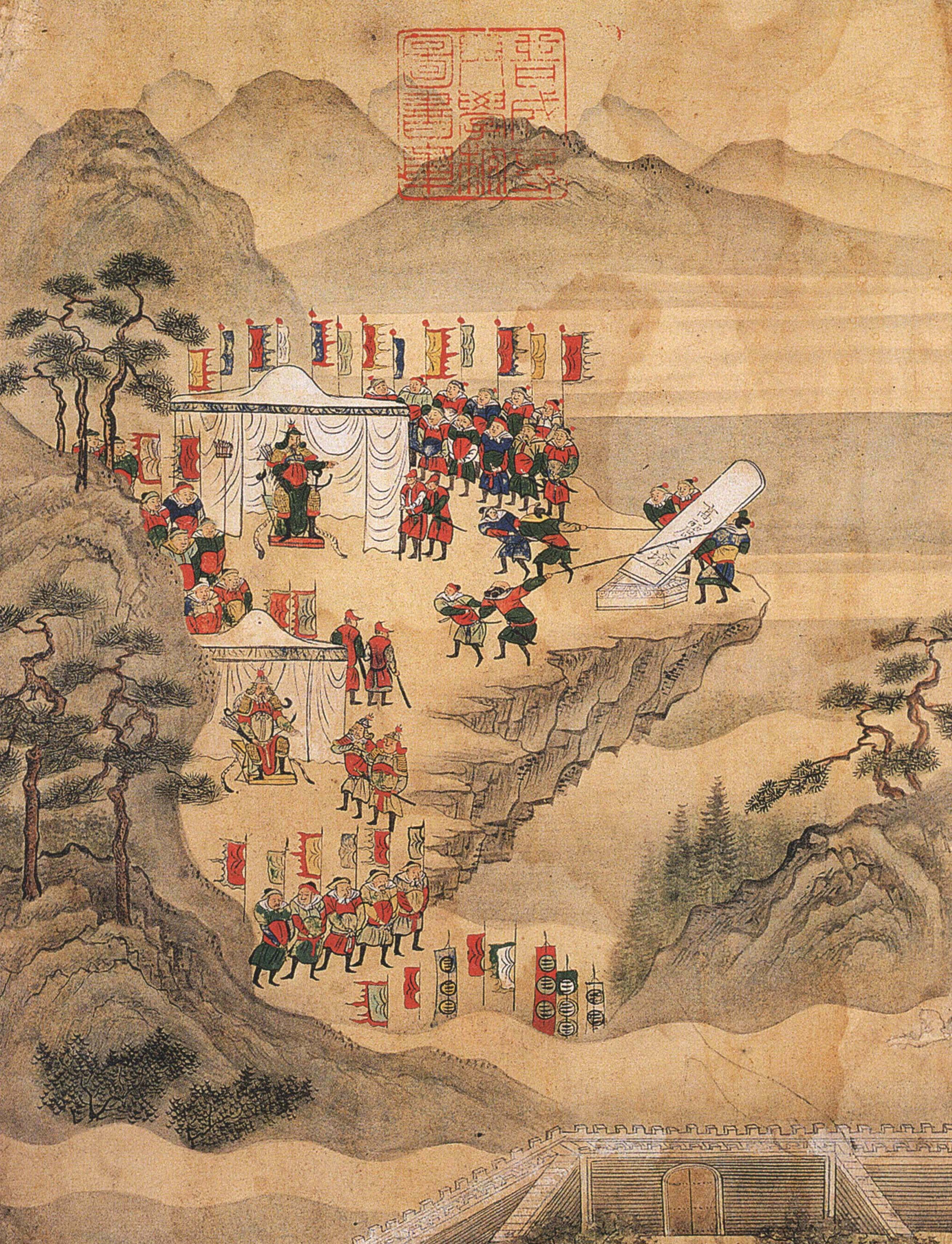
- A historical painting depicting the scene of Yun Kwan of Goryeo conquering the Jurchens and erecting a monument to mark the border.
Date	10th century – 17th century
Location	North-eastern Korean Peninsula
Result	Goryeo: Stalemate; Joseon: Initially victory then defeated by the Later Jin
Territorial changes	Korea annexed the entire peninsula with the conquest of Hamgyong.

Belligerents
Goryeo; Joseon	Jurchens; Jin dynasty Later Jin dynasty

Commanders and leaders
Yun Kwan; Kim Chongsŏ	Wuyashu; Amin

The Korean–Jurchen border conflicts were a series of conflicts from the 10th century to the 17th century between the Korean states of Goryeo and Joseon and the Jurchen people.

== Background ==
In 993, the land between the border of Liao and Goryeo was occupied by troublesome Jurchen tribes, but the Goryeo diplomat Sŏ Hŭi was able to negotiate with Liao and obtain that land up to the Yalu River, citing that in the past it belonged to Goguryeo, the predecessor to Goryeo.

Both Balhae remnants and miscellaneous tribal peoples like Jurchens lived in the area between the Yalu and Daedong rivers which was targeted for annexation by Goryeo.

== Goryeo period ==
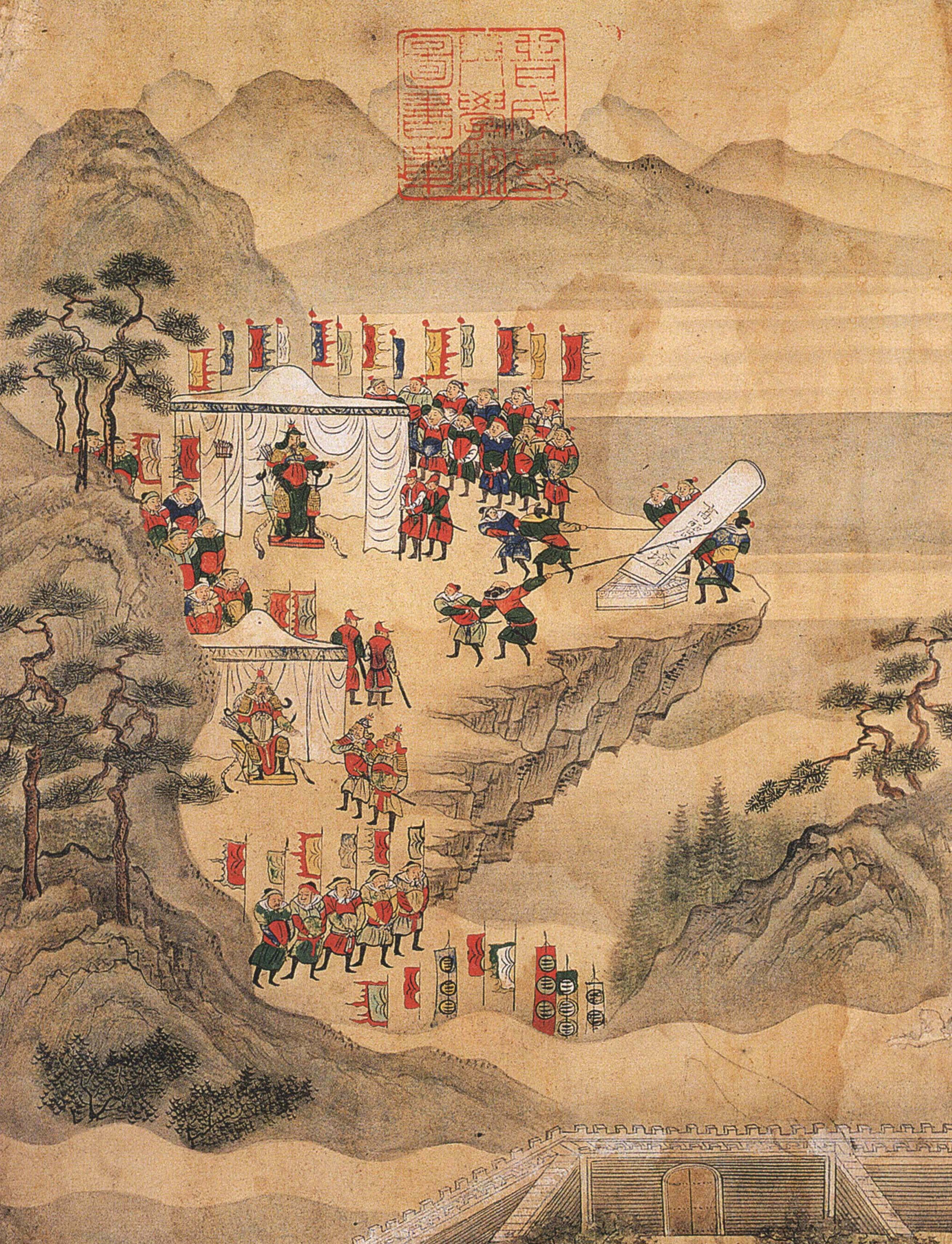
General Yun Kwan (1040–1111) and his army.

The Jurchens in the Yalu River region were tributaries of Goryeo since the reign of Taejo of Goryeo (r. 918-943), who called upon them during the wars of the Later Three Kingdoms period. Taejo relied heavily on a large Jurchen cavalry force to defeat Later Baekje. The Jurchens switched allegiances between the Liao and Goryeo multiple times depending on which they deemed the most appropriate. The Liao and Goryeo competed to gain the allegiance of Jurchen settlers who effectively controlled much of the border area beyond Goryeo and Liao fortifications. These Jurchens offered tribute but expected to be rewarded richly by the Goryeo court in return. However the Jurchens who offered tribute were often the same ones who raided Goryeo's borders. In one instance, the Goryeo court discovered that a Jurchen leader who had brought tribute had been behind the recent raids on their territory. The frontier was largely outside of direct control and lavish gifts were doled out as a means of controlling the Jurchens. Sometimes Jurchens submitted to Goryeo and were given citizenship. Goryeo inhabitants were forbidden from trading with Jurchens.

The tributary relations between Jurchens and Goryeo began to change under the reign of Jurchen leader Wuyashu (r. 1103–1113) of the Wanyan clan. The Wanyan clan was intimately aware of the Jurchens who had submitted to Goryeo and used their power to break the clans' allegiance to Goryeo, unifying the Jurchens. The resulting conflict between the two powers led to Goryeo's withdrawal from Jurchen territory and acknowledgment of Jurchen control over the contested region.

As the geopolitical situation shifted, Goryeo unleashed a series of military campaigns in the early 12th century to regain control of its borderlands. Goryeo had already been in conflict with the Jurchens before. In 984, Goryeo failed to control the Yalu River basin due to conflict with the Jurchens. In 1056, Goryeo repelled the Eastern Jurchens and afterward destroyed their stronghold of over 20 villages. In 1080, Munjong of Goryeo led a force of 30,000 to conquer ten villages. However by the rise of the Wanyan clan, the quality of Goryeo's army had degraded and it mostly consisted of infantry. There were several clashes with the Jurchens, usually resulting in Jurchen victory with their mounted cavalrymen. In 1104, the Wanyan Jurchens reached Chongju while pursuing tribes resisting them. Goryeo sent Im Gan to confront the Jurchens, but his untrained army was defeated, and the Jurchens took Chongju castle. Im Gan was dismissed from office and reinstated, dying as a civil servant in 1112. The war effort was taken up by Yun Kwan, but the situation was unfavorable and he returned after making peace.

Yun Kwan believed that the loss was due to their inferior cavalry and proposed to the king that an elite force known as the Byeolmuban (別武班; "Special Warfare Army") be created. It existed apart from the main army and was made up of cavalry, infantry, and a Hangmagun ("Subdue Demon Corps"). In December 1107, Yun Kwan and O Yŏnch'on set out with 170,000 soldiers to conquer the Jurchens. The army won against the Jurchens and built Nine Fortresses over a wide area on the frontier encompassing Jurchen tribal lands, and erected a monument to mark the boundary. However due to unceasing Jurchen attacks, diplomatic appeals, and court intrigue, the Nine Fortresses were handed back to the Jurchens. In 1108, Yun Kwan was removed from office and the Nine Fortresses were turned over to the Wanyan clan. It is plausible that the Jurchens and Goryeo had some sort of implicit understanding where the Jurchens would cease their attacks while Goryeo took advantage of the conflict between the Jurchens and Khitans to gain territory. According to Breuker, Goryeo never really had control of the region occupied by the Nine Fortresses in the first place and maintaining hegemony would have meant a prolonged conflict with militarily superior Jurchen troops that would prove very costly. The Nine Fortresses were exchanged for Poju (Uiju), a region the Jurchens later contested when Goryeo hesitated to recognize them as their suzerain.

Later, Wuyashu's younger brother Aguda founded the Jin dynasty (1115–1234). When the Jin was founded, the Jurchens called Goryeo their "parent country" or "father and mother" country. This was because it had traditionally been part of their system of tributary relations, its rhetoric, advanced culture, as well as the idea that it was "bastard offspring of Koryŏ". The Jin also believed that they shared a common ancestry with the Balhae people in the Liao dynasty. The Jin went on to conquer the Liao dynasty in 1125 and capture the Song capital of Kaifeng in 1127 (Jingkang incident). The Jin also put pressure on Goryeo and demanded that Goryeo become their subject. While many in Goryeo were against this, Yi Cha-gyŏm was in power at the time and judged peaceful relations with the Jin to be beneficial to his own political power. He accepted the Jin demands and in 1126, the king of Goryeo declared himself a Jin vassal (tributary). However the Goryeo king retained his position as "Son of Heaven" within Goryeo. By incorporating Jurchen history into that of Goryeo and emphasizing the Jin emperors as bastard offspring of Goryeo, and placing the Jin within the template of a "northern dynasty", the imposition of Jin suzerainty became more acceptable.

== Joseon period ==
The Joseon Koreans tried to deal with the Jurchens by using both forceful means and incentives. Sometimes the military was dispatched, in tandem with appeasement with titles and degrees, and allowing Jurchens to sell furs for Joseon crops to make up for Jurchens' lack of food. Starting with Lee Ji-ran's recommendation and example, attempts were started to acculturate Jurchens by having Koreans marry them to integrate them into Korea. Despite the tributary relations and gifting and acculturating, many Jurchen tribes were submissive one year and rebellious the next. By the 1400s, the Ming Yongle Emperor was determined to wrest the Jurchens out of Korean influence and brought under Ming control instead.

A key Jurchen leader named Mengtemu (Möngke Temür), chief of the Odoli Jurchens, who had always claimed he had been a servant of the Taejo of Joseon since Taejo's days as a border general of Goryeo, and even following him (Taejo Lee Seong-gye) to his wars, because he fed Mengtemu's family and provided land for him to live during his impoverished youth. Mengtemu was asked by Joseon to reject Ming's overtures, but was unsuccessful since Mengtemu folded and submitted to the Ming in 1412.

Joseon under Sejong the Great engaged in military campaigns against the Jurchen and after defeating the Odoli, Maolian and Udige clans, Joseon managed to take control of Hamgyong. This shaped the modern borders of Korea around 1450, when several border forts were established in the region.

== Aftermath ==
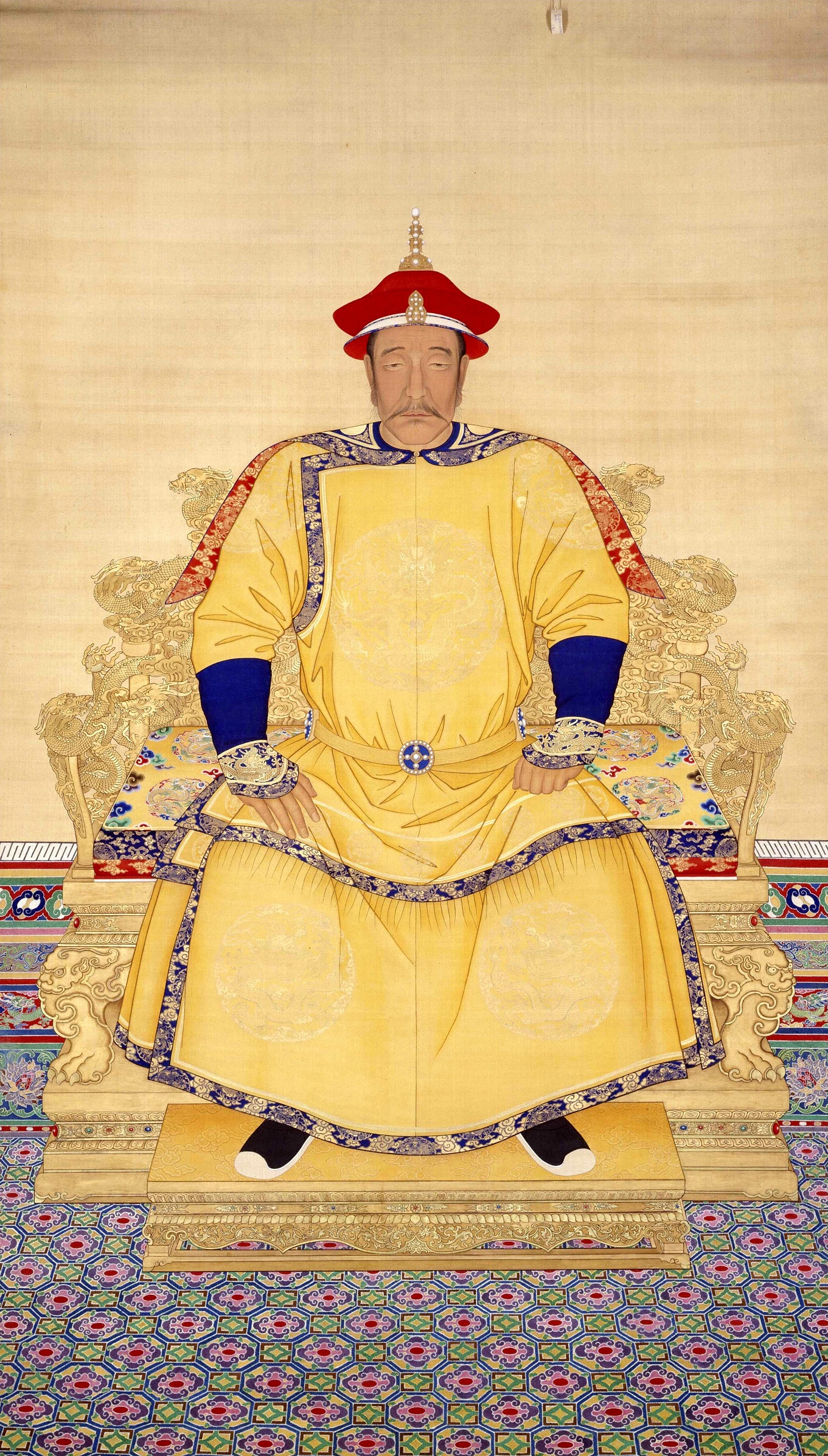
Nurhaci

Nurhaci, who was originally a vassalage to the Ming dynasty, made efforts to unify the Jurchen tribes including the Jianzhou, Haixi and Wild Jurchens. He offered the Ming dynasty to send Jianzhou Jurchen troops into Korea to fight against the Japanese forces during the Japanese invasions of Korea in the 1590s. The Ming dynasty was still fully recognized by Nurhaci as his overlord since he did not send this message to Joseon and only to the Ming. Nurhaci's offer to fight against the Japanese was denied due to misgivings from the Koreans, but the Ming awarded Nurhaci the title of dragon-tiger general (龍虎將軍) along with another Jurchen leader.

Nurhaci later established the Later Jin dynasty and openly renounced Ming overlordship with the Seven Grievances in 1618. A 30,000-strong Jurchen force led by Nurhaci's nephew Amin overran Joseon's defenses during the Later Jin invasion of Joseon in 1627. The Jurchens pushed Joseon to adopt "brotherly relations" with the Later Jin through a treaty. In 1636, Nurhaci's son and Qing emperor Hong Taiji dispatched a punitive expedition to Joseon because Injo of Joseon persisted in his anti-Jurchen (anti-Manchu) policies. Having been defeated, Joseon was compelled to sever ties with the Ming and instead recognized the Qing as suzerain according to the imperial Chinese tributary system.

== See also ==
- Goryeo–Khitan War
- Mongol invasions of Korea

== Sources ==
- History of Goryeo
- Breuker, Remco E. (2010), Establishing a Pluralist Society in Medieval Korea, 918-1170: History, Ideology and Identity in the Koryŏ Dynasty, vol. 1 of Brill's Korean Studies Library, Leiden, South Holland: Brill, pp. 220-221, ISBN 978-9004183254
- Brown, Kerry (2014), Berkshire Dictionary of Chinese Biography, Berkshire Publishing Group LLC
- Ebrey, Patricia Buckley; Walthall, Anne (2014), Pre-Modern East Asia: To 1800: A Cultural, Social, and Political History, Third Edition, Boston, MA: Wadsworth, Cengage Learning, ISBN 978-1-133-60651-2.
- Association for Asian Studies. Ming Biographical History Project Committee (1976), Goodrich, Luther Carrington (ed.), Dictionary of Ming Biography, 1368-1644, vol. 2 (illustrated ed.), Columbia University Press, p. 1066, ISBN 023103833X
- Kim, Alexander (2011b), On the Origin of the Jurchen People (A Study Based on Russian Sources)
- Lee, Ki-baik (1984), A New History of Korea, translated by Wagner, Edward W.; Schultz, Edward J., Harvard University Press, ISBN 978-0-674-61576-2
- Peterson, Willard J., ed. (2002), The Cambridge History of China, Vol. 9, Pt. 1: The Ch'ing Dynasty to 1800, Cambridge: Cambridge University Press, pp. 13, 31, ISBN 0-521-24334-3
- Robinson, Kenneth R.. 1992. "From Raiders to Traders: Border Security and Border Control in Early Chosŏn, 1392—1450". Korean Studies 16. University of Hawai'i Press: 94–115. https://www.jstor.org/stable/23720024.
- Seth, Michael J. (2006), A Concise History of Korea: From the Neolithic Period Through the Nineteenth Century, Rowman & Littlefield, p. 138, ISBN 978-0-7425-4005-7
- Seth, Michael J. (16 October 2010), A History of Korea: From Antiquity to the Present, Rowman & Littlefield Publishers, p. 144, ISBN 978-0-7425-6717-7
- Rossabi, Morris (1998), "The Ming and Inner Asia", in Denis C. Twitchett; Frederick W. Mote (eds.), The Cambridge History of China, Vol. 8: The Ming Dynasty, 1368–1644, Pt. 2, Cambridge, England: Cambridge University Press, pp. 221–71, ISBN 0521243335
- Twitchett, Denis C.; Fairbank, John King; Franke, Herbert (1994), The Cambridge History of China: Volume 6, Alien Regimes and Border States, 907–1368, Cambridge University Press, ISBN 978-0-521-24331-5
- Yun, Peter I. (1998). Rethinking the Tribute System: Korean States and northeast Asian Interstate Relations, 600-1600 (Ph.D. thesis). University of California, Los Angeles. ISBN 9780599031203..
- Zhang Feng (2008), "Traditional East Asian Structure from the Perspective of Sino-Korean Relations", International Relations Department The London School of Economics and Political Science: 29, 30, archived from the original on 20 April 2014, "Paper presented to ISA's 49th Annual Convention, San Francisco, March 26–29, 2008"
