= Jurchen =

Jurchen may refer to:

- Jurchen people, Tungusic people who inhabited the region of Manchuria until the 17th century
  - Haixi Jurchens, a grouping of the Jurchens as identified by the Chinese of the Ming Dynasty
  - Jianzhou Jurchens, a grouping of the Jurchens as identified by the Chinese of the Ming Dynasty
  - Wild Jurchens, a grouping of the Jurchens as identified by the Chinese of the Ming Dynasty
- Jurchen script, writing system of Jurchen people
- Jurchen language, extinct language spoken by Jurchen people
- Jin dynasty (1115–1234), also known as the Jurchen Dynasty
