= Li Chengliang =

Chinese general (1526–1615)

Li Chengliang 李成梁
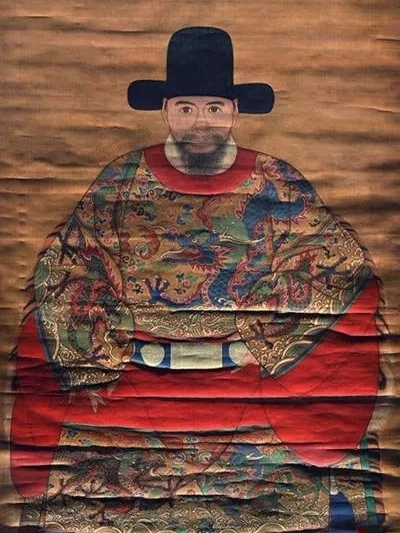
- Born: 1526; Tieling, Liaodong, now Liaoning
- Died: 1615 (aged 88–89)
- Allegiance: Ming dynasty

Li Chengliang or Lee Seong-ryang (Chinese: 李成梁; pinyin: Lǐ Chéngliáng; Korean: 이성량; 1526–1615), courtesy name Ruqi (汝契), art name Yincheng (引城), was a Ming dynasty general.

== Early life ==
Born in a military family in Tieling (in modern-day Liaoning province, Liaodong in the Ming empire's northeast), Li suffered from poverty during his childhood. It was not until he reached the age of 40 that he received an official appointment, but he eventually became Liaodong Regional Commander (遼東總兵) with the backing of the Chief Grand Secretary Zhang Juzheng. Li served two terms as Liaodong Regional Commander, for 22 years and 8 years respectively.

== Military career against the Mongols ==
In the 1570s, the Chahar Mongols migrated east and often harassed the Liaodong region. Li's first tenure as Liaodong Regional General saw five victories against the Chahar. For these victories, in 1579 he was named "Earl of Ningyuan" (Ningyuan bo 寧遠伯), a title that was made hereditary in 1580.

1. 1575 (third year of the Wanli reign): Tümen Khan led over a hundred thousand cavalry troops to attack and pillage the Yizhou and Jinzhou regions, but was defeated by Li.
2. 1578 (Wanli 6): Tümen Khan attacked again, this time in Liaoyang, but was defeated again.
3. 1579 (Wanli 7): Tümen Khan attacked the Yizhou / Jinzhou region and besieged Guangning 廣寧 (modern-day Beining).
4. 1580 (Wanli 8): Tümen Khan gathered 40,000 cavalry, each horse tailing a cattle and three sheep.
5. 1581 (Wanli 9): Tümen Khan gathered nine tribes totaling a hundred thousand men and horses and attacked Liaodong with the intention of reaching Beijing.

== Jianzhou Jurchen war ==
He was charged with maintaining peaceful relations with the Jurchen tribes.

The Jianzhou Jurchen chieftain Wang Gao (王杲) had frequently assaulted Ming cities and killed the Ming commander at Fushun in 1573. The Ming sent a punitive expedition that drove Wang north into the lands of another Jurchen tribe, the Hada, where he was captured by Wang Tai, leader of the Hūlun federation, and handed over to Li Chengliang, who executed him in 1575.

Wang Gao's death intensified the power struggles that were already taking place between Jianzhou Jurchen chieftains. Giocangga and his son Taksi, who had been subjects to Wang Gao's authority, secretly allied themselves with Li Chengliang to enhance their power. In 1582 Wang Gao's son Atai (阿台) raided Ming lands. Ming sent a punitive expedition, which Giocangga and Taksi supported. In the ensuing assault on Atai's fort, and under unclear circumstances, both Giocangga and Taksi were killed, by rival Jurchen leader Nikan Wailan who was also siding with the Ming troops under the command of Li Chengliang. Li Chengliang fostered and protected Nurhaci, Taksi's son. With Li's support, Nurhaci gradually grew his strength in the following years. Early in 1583, Nurhaci obtained from Li Chengliang the right to succeed his father as a minor Jurchen chieftain.

Later Li Chengliang gave Nikan Wailan to Nurhaci in 1587, who beheaded him immediately.

Through a series of alliances and military victories, Nurhaci eventually managed to unify all Jurchen tribes under his own leadership. Having named himself khan of the Later Jin dynasty, he rose in rebellion against the Ming. The first of his Seven Grievances against the Ming, promulgated in 1618 as a casus belli, was that the Ming, "with no justification whatsoever, violated our borders and killed my father and grandfather."

== Patronage ==
Li Chengliang enjoyed the patronage and support of the Wanli Emperor (r. 1572–1620) and his powerful Grand Secretary Zhang Juzheng (1525–1582), who controlled the Ming government during the first 10 years of the Wanli reign. Together, Zhang and the emperor granted Li and his sons "titles and responsibilities never before enjoyed by hereditary military officials." In addition to receiving stipends from the Ming capital, Li enhanced his wealth through "war booty, horse rustling in the borderlands, and coercive manipulation of prices in border markets."

== Descendants ==
Of Li Chengliang's nine sons, Li Rusong, Li Rubai would rise to become "regional commanders" (zongbing 總兵) and "assistant regional commanders" (canjiang 參將) for the Ming. Li Rusong would eventually be executed by the Mongols, and Li Rubai committed suicide after the Battle of Sarhū, when he lost to Nurhaci.

== Works cited ==
- Crossley, Pamely Kyle (1987), "Manzhou yuanliu kao and the Formalization of the Manchu Heritage", Journal of Asian Studies, 46 (4): 761–90, doi:10.2307/2057101, JSTOR 2057101, S2CID 162618002
- Fang, Chao-ying (房兆楹) (1943). "Li Ch'êng-liang" . In Hummel, Arthur W. Sr. (ed.). Eminent Chinese of the Ch'ing Period. United States Government Printing Office. pp. 450–52.
- ——— (1943). "Nurhaci" . In Hummel, Arthur W. Sr. (ed.). Eminent Chinese of the Ch'ing Period. United States Government Printing Office. pp. 594–99.
- Robinson, David M. (2013), "Military labor in China, c. 1500", in Zürcher, Erik-Jan (ed.), Fighting for a Living: A Comparative Study of Military Labour 1500–2000, Amsterdam: Amsterdam University Press, pp. 43–80, ISBN 9789089644527, JSTOR j.ctt6wp6pg.5
- Ryor, Kathleen (2004), "Regulating the Qi and the Xin: Xu Wei (1521-1593) and His Military Patrons", Archives of Asian Art, 54: 23–33, doi:10.1484/aaa.2004.0003, JSTOR 20111314
