= Haixi =

Haixi may refer to:

- Haixi Mongol and Tibetan Autonomous Prefecture, in Qinghai, China
- Haixi Jurchens, group of the Jurchens as identified by the Chinese of the Ming Dynasty
- Songhua River, formerly known as Haixi River
- Roman Egypt, "West of the sea" in Chinese chronicles
