= Jurchen unification =

1583–1619 unification of the Jurchen tribes

- Part of the Ming-Qing transition
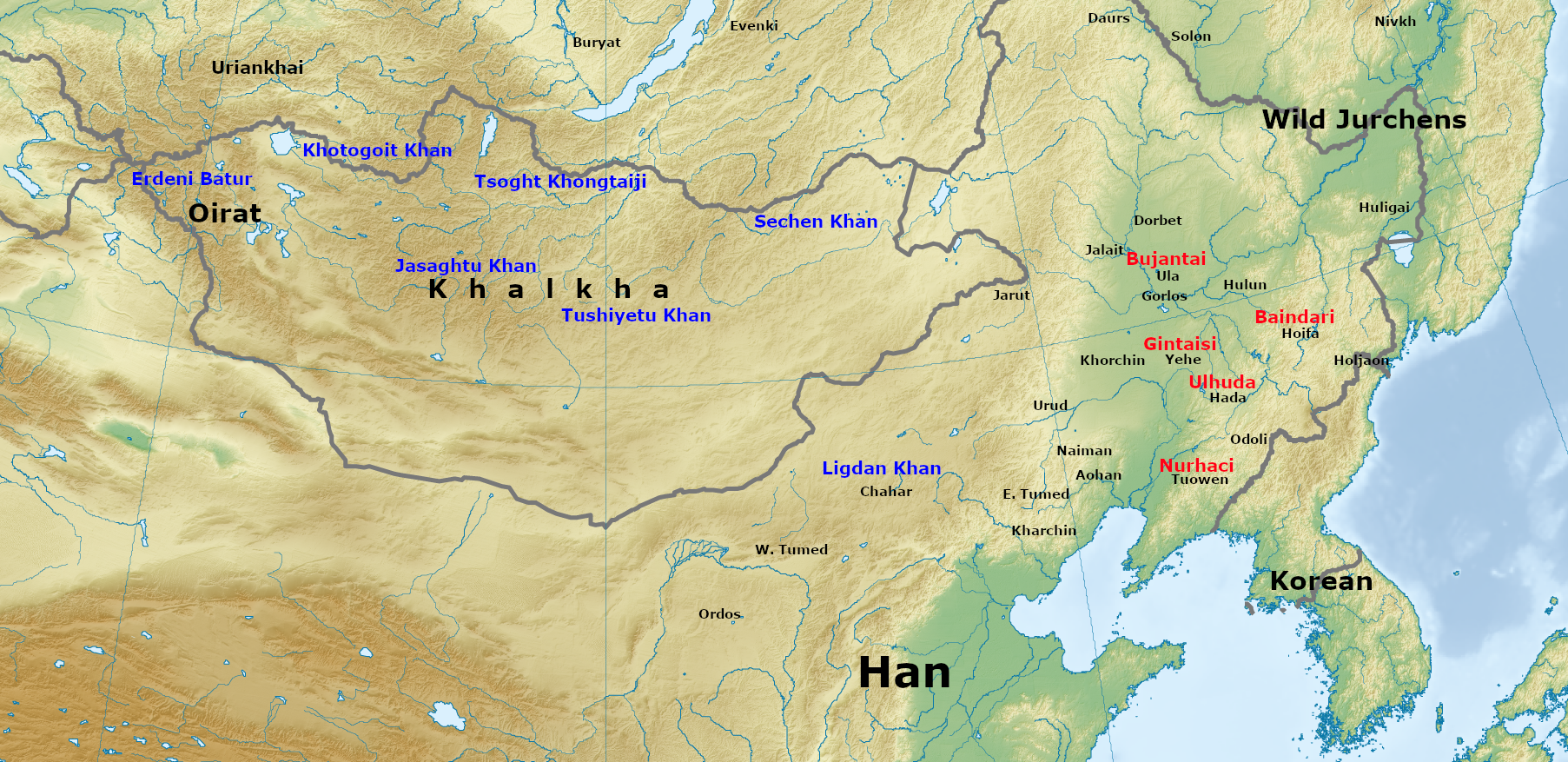
Date	1583–1619
Location	Manchuria
Result	Unification of Jurchen tribes and the establishment of the Later Jin dynasty

Belligerents
Jurchens loyal to Nurhaci	Jianzhou Jurchens; Haixi Jurchens; Wild Jurchens

Commanders and leaders
Nurhaci	Nikan Wailan; Baindari; Bujantai; Gintaisi

The Jurchen unification was a series of events in the late 16th and early 17th centuries that led to the unification of the Jurchen tribes under the Jianzhou Jurchen leader Nurhaci. While Nurhaci was originally a vassal of the Ming dynasty who considered himself a local representative of imperial Ming power, he also had a somewhat antagonistic relationship with the Ming due to Ming involvement in events early on in his life that led to the death of his father and grandfather combined with his own increasing ambition.

From 1583 to the early 1600s, Nurhaci led a series of military and influence campaigns that led to the unification of the majority of the Jurchen tribes. In 1616, Nurhaci established the Later Jin dynasty and ruled as its founding khan, and he renounced Ming overlordship with the Seven Grievances in 1618. After his death in 1626 his son Hong Taiji proclaimed the Qing dynasty by renaming the dynasty "Great Qing".

== Background ==
The Ming dynasty founder sent military commissions to gain control of the Jurchen tribes. After the dissolution of the Nurgan Regional Military Commission in the 15th century, the Ming dynasty adopted a political strategy of divide and rule for different Jurchen tribes. The Ming categorized the Jurchens into three groups, the Jianzhou Jurchens, the Haixi Jurchens, and the Wild Jurchens.

The Jianzhou were primarily composed of three tribes, the Odoli, Huligai, and Tuowen. The Haixi were dominated by the Hulun confederation composed of four tribes, the Ula, Hada, Hoifa, and Yehe. Not much is known about the Wild Jurchens except for the existence of a Donghai tribe among them.

The Hulun confederation was dominated by the head of the Hada tribe, Wang Tai, from 1548 onward. As hegemon he created alliances with both Jurchens and Mongols, eventually assuming the title of khan. Under Wang Tai, the Hulun expanded their territory at the expense of the Jianzhou. His rule was based upon personal prestige, and when he died in 1582, his son lost control of the confederation. Power over the Hulun passed from the Hada to two brothers of the Yehe tribe. At this point the Ming intervened and decided to open separate markets to divide and weaken their authority over the Hulun. This inadvertently led to the rise of the Jianzhou Jurchens.

== Jianzhou war ==
The Jianzhou chieftain Wang Gao (王杲) had been hostile to the Ming for some time and frequently assaulted Ming cities with Mongol allies. After he killed the Ming commander at Fushun in 1573, the Ming counter-attacked and drove Wang north into the lands of the Hada, where he was captured by Wang Tai, leader of the Hulun alliance, who handed him over to the Ming general Li Chengliang. Li had him executed in 1575.

The death of Wang Gao provoked a power struggle among the Jianzhou tribes. Previously subordinates of Wang Gao, Giocangga and his son Taksi secretly allied themselves with Li Chengliang to enhance their power. In 1582 Wang Gao's son Atai (阿台) raided Ming lands. Ming sent a punitive expedition with the support of Giocangga and Taksi.

During the assault on Atai's fort, both Giocangga and Taksi were killed by another Jurchen ally of the Ming, Nikan Wailan. The Ming claimed it was an accident and refused to hand over Nikan Wailan over to Taksi's son, Nurhaci, although they did provide him with some gifts and investiture as reparation.

== Rise of Nurhaci ==
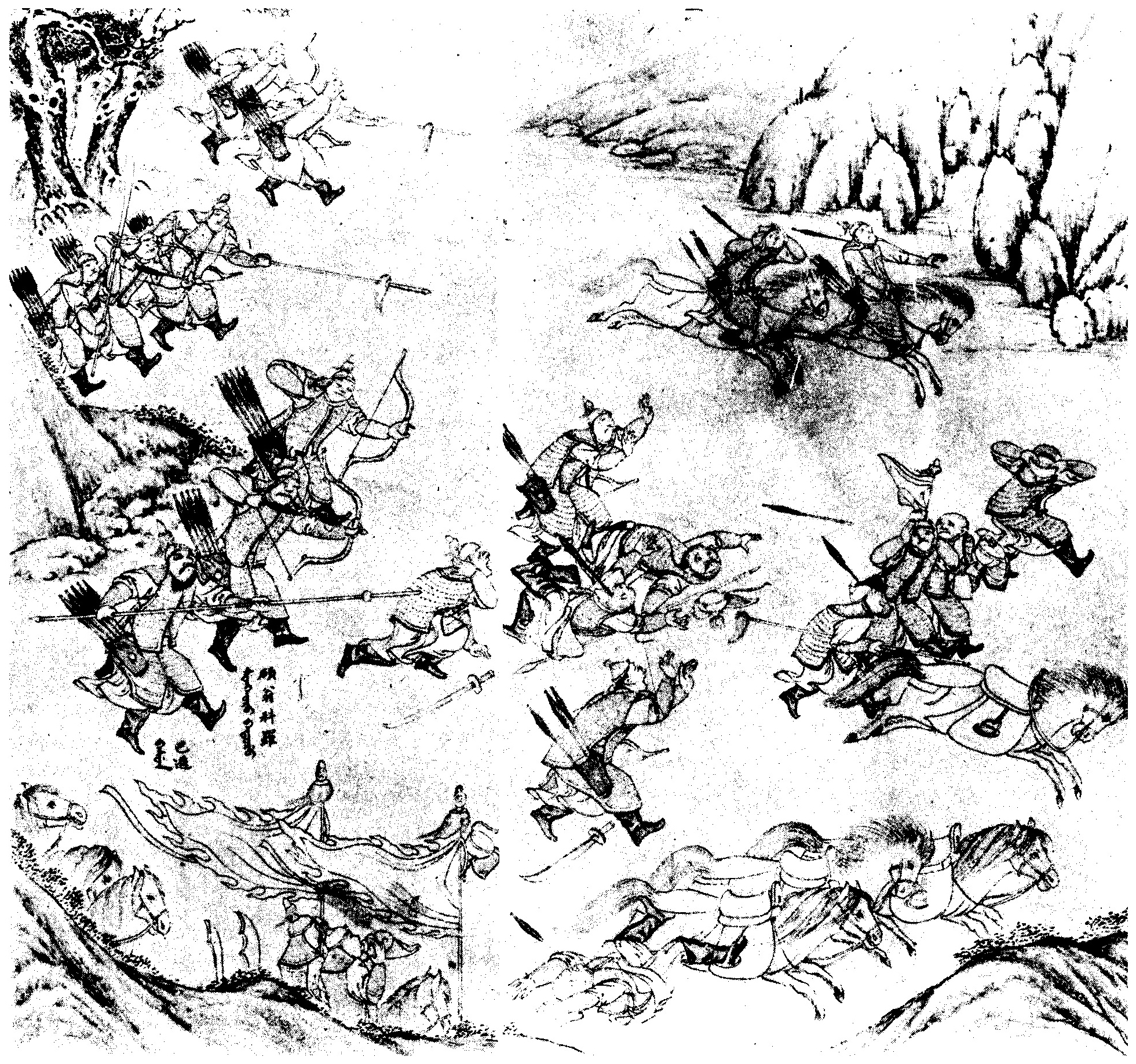
Nurhaci's army defeating the Hada Jurchens

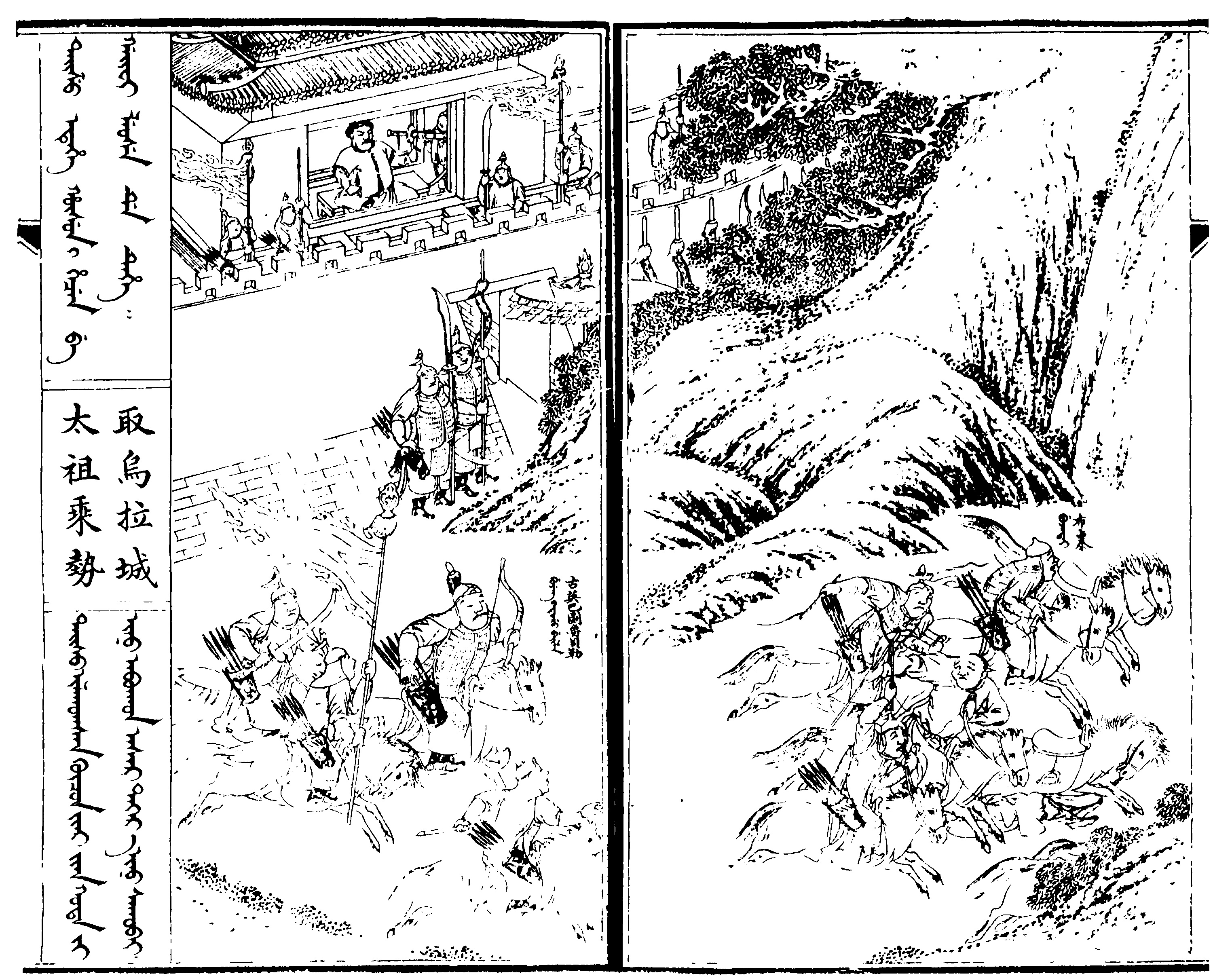
Nurhaci taking the city of Wula from the Haixi Jurchens

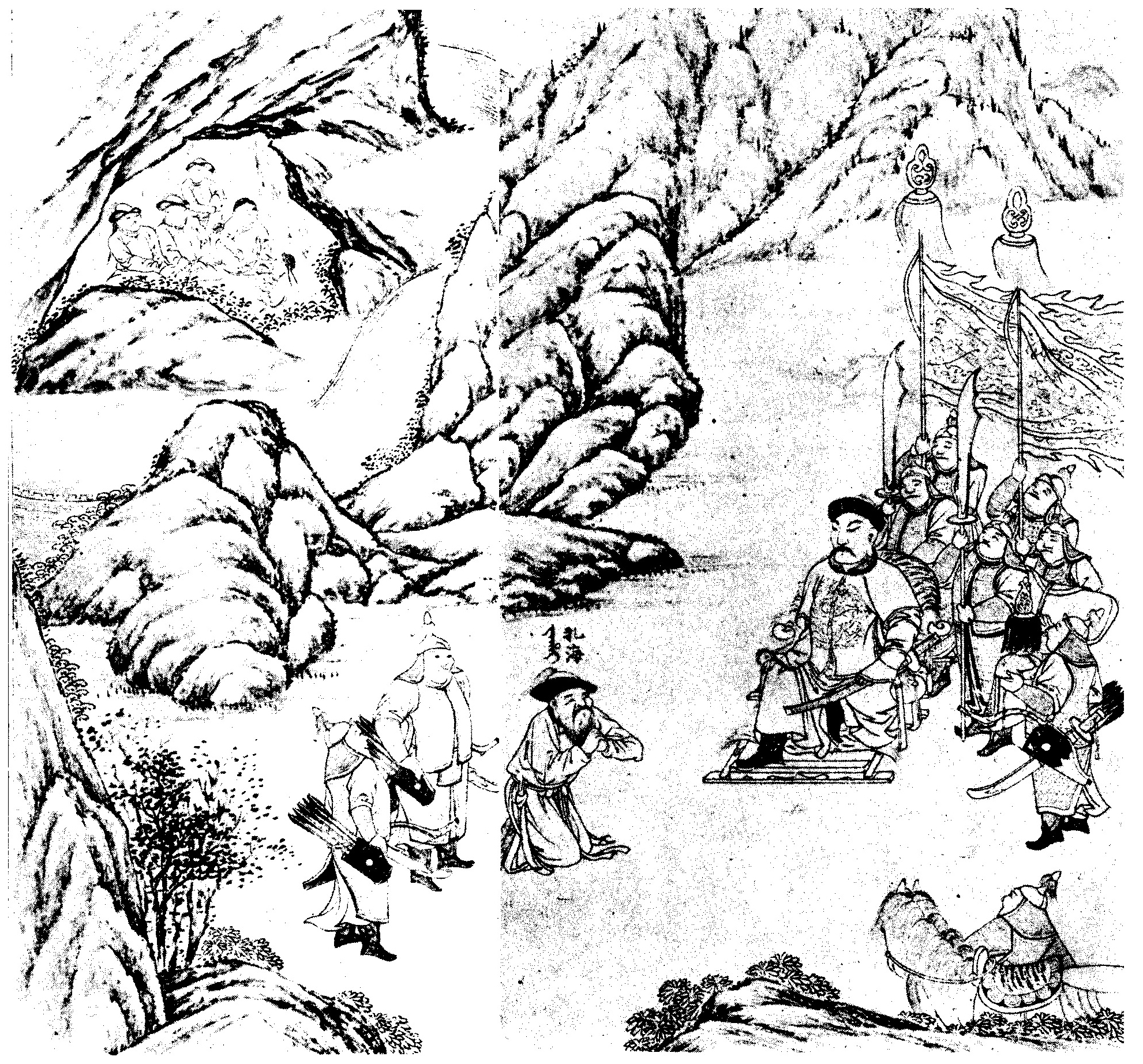
Nurhaci accepting the submission of Zhahai

Nurhaci grew to be a promising leader. He was talented in mounted archery as a youth and was proficient in the Jurchen, Mongol, and Chinese languages. Some sources suggest that during his youth, Nurhaci lived in Li Chengliang's household in Fushun and therefore acquired literacy in Chinese. During much of his early life he officially considered himself a guardian of the Ming border and a local representative of Ming imperial power.

Early in 1583, Nurhaci obtained from Ming general Li Chengliang the right to succeed his father as a minor Jurchen chieftain. He went to war with Nikan Wailan and forced him to flee to the Ming dynasty, where he was eventually executed. Nurhaci continued to expand his influence by steadily wiping out smaller tribes while at the same time currying favor with the Ming. In 1589, he endeared himself to the Ming by rescuing several kidnapped Chinese and delivering them to Ming authorities, an act which earned him the title of assistant commissioner-in-chief.

He consolidated his relationship with the Ming by personally leading tributary missions to the Ming court until 1611, and was seen by the Ming as a loyal subject. He returned Ming captives back to the proper authorities, and even offered to fight against the Japanese invasions of Korea (1592–1598). His offer to fight against the Japanese was denied due to misgivings from the Koreans, but the Ming awarded Nurhaci the title of dragon-tiger general (龍虎將軍) along with the Hada leader.

In 1587, Nurhaci founded a new capital at Fe Ala. By 1591, he controlled a swathe of territory stretching from Fushun to the Yalu River. His aggressive tactics against other Jurchen tribes were fueled by the high status that the Ming had given him, and his success provoked a combined assault by nine tribes composed of Hada, Ula, Hoifa, Khorchin Mongols, Sibe, Guwalca, Jušeri, Neyen, and the Yehe. The 30,000 strong coalition forces were defeated in 1593.

As of 1599, Nurhaci had control over the Hada, but allowed the Ming to invest their leaders with titles. Nurhaci also worked to unify the Jurchens as a people by tasking Erdeni Baksi and Dahai Jargūci with adapting the Mongol script to the Jurchen language. He also created the Eight Banners army system that would characterize Manchu military organization for the majority of their history. In 1601 he dispensed with pretenses and subjugated the Hada. The Hoifa followed in 1607 and a campaign against the Ula was begun in 1608.

In 1603 the Jianzhou capital was moved to Hetu Ala due to water problems at the previous site. In 1605, Gwanghaegun of Joseon sent an expedition north which destroyed the Jurchen Holjaon tribe. The majority of Jurchens however ended up as part of Nurhaci's realm. The Wild Jurchens were defeated in 1611 and the Ula were incorporated in 1613.

The last major Jurchen tribe, the Yehe, would not be subjugated until 1619, three years after Nurhaci declared himself khan of the Later Jin dynasty (or Amaga Aisin Gurun in Manchu). Meanwhile, he announced the Seven Grievances in 1618 and openly renounced Ming overlordship and started to fight against the Ming. The Yehe joined the Ming in fighting Nurhaci at the Battle of Sarhū, but they were defeated, and finally subjugated at the Battle of Xicheng a few months later. The Later Jin dynasty is considered the precursor to the Qing dynasty which would later conquer the Ming dynasty.

== Bibliography ==
- Andrade, Tonio (2016), The Gunpowder Age: China, Military Innovation, and the Rise of the West in World History, Princeton University Press, ISBN 978-0-691-13597-7.
- Asimov, M.S. (1998), History of civilizations of Central Asia Volume IV The age of achievement: A.D. 750 to the end of the fifteenth century Part One The historical, social and economic setting, UNESCO Publishing
- Barfield, Thomas (1989), The Perilous Frontier: Nomadic Empires and China, Basil Blackwell
- Barrett, Timothy Hugh (2008), The Woman Who Discovered Printing, Great Britain: Yale University Press, ISBN 978-0-300-12728-7 (alk. paper)
- Beckwith, Christopher I (1987), The Tibetan Empire in Central Asia: A History of the Struggle for Great Power among Tibetans, Turks, Arabs, and Chinese during the Early Middle Ages, Princeton University Press
- Beckwith, Christopher I. (2009), Empires of the Silk Road: A History of Central Eurasia from the Bronze Age to the Present, Princeton University Press, ISBN 978-0-691-13589-2
- Crossley, Pamely Kyle (1987), "Manzhou yuanliu kao and the Formalization of the Manchu Heritage", Journal of Asian Studies, 46 (4): 761–90, doi:10.2307/2057101, JSTOR 2057101, S2CID 162618002
- Crossley, Pamela Kyle (1997), The Manchus, Blackwell Publishers Ltd
- Biran, Michal (2005), The Empire of the Qara Khitai in Eurasian History: Between China and the Islamic World, Cambridge Studies in Islamic Civilization, Cambridge, England: Cambridge University Press, ISBN 0521842263
- Bregel, Yuri (2003), An Historical Atlas of Central Asia, Brill
- Chase, Kenneth Warren (2003), Firearms: A Global History to 1700, Cambridge University Press, ISBN 978-0-521-82274-9
- Drompp, Michael Robert (2005), Tang China And The Collapse Of The Uighur Empire: A Documentary History, Brill
- Ebrey, Patricia Buckley (1999), The Cambridge Illustrated History of China, Cambridge: Cambridge University Press, ISBN 0-521-66991-X (paperback).
- Ebrey, Patricia Buckley; Walthall, Anne; Palais, James B. (2006), East Asia: A Cultural, Social, and Political History, Boston: Houghton Mifflin, ISBN 0-618-13384-4
- Elliott, Mark C. (2001), The Manchu Way: The Eight Banners and Ethnic Identity in Late Imperial China, Stanford University Press, ISBN 9780804746847
- Fang, Chao-ying (房兆楹) (1943). "Li Ch'êng-liang" . In Hummel, Arthur W. Sr. (ed.). Eminent Chinese of the Ch'ing Period. United States Government Printing Office. pp. 450–52.
- ——— (1943). "Nurhaci" . In Hummel, Arthur W. Sr. (ed.). Eminent Chinese of the Ch'ing Period. United States Government Printing Office. pp. 594–99.
- Golden, Peter B. (1992), An Introduction to the History of the Turkic Peoples: Ethnogenesis and State-Formation in Medieval and Early Modern Eurasia and the Middle East, OTTO HARRASSOWITZ · WIESBADEN
- Graff, David A. (2002), Medieval Chinese Warfare, 300-900, Warfare and History, London: Routledge, ISBN 0415239559
- Graff, David Andrew (2016), The Eurasian Way of War Military Practice in Seventh-Century China and Byzantium, Routledge, ISBN 978-0-415-46034-7.
- Haywood, John (1998), Historical Atlas of the Medieval World, AD 600-1492, Barnes & Noble
- Latourette, Kenneth Scott (1964), The Chinese, their history and culture, Volumes 1-2, Macmillan
- Lorge, Peter (2005), War, Politics and Society in Early Modern China, 900–1795, Routledge, ISBN 978-0-203-96929-8
- Lorge, Peter A. (2008), The Asian Military Revolution: from Gunpowder to the Bomb, Cambridge University Press, ISBN 978-0-521-60954-8
- Luttwak, Edward N. (2009), The Grand Strategy of the Byzantine Empire, The Belknap Press of Harvard University Press
- Millward, James (2009), Eurasian Crossroads: A History of Xinjiang, Columbia University Press
- Mote, F. W. (2003), Imperial China: 900–1800, Harvard University Press, ISBN 978-0674012127
- Narangoa, Li (2014), Historical Atlas of Northeast Asia, 1590-2010: Korea, Manchuria, Mongolia, Eastern Siberia, New York: Columbia University Press, ISBN 9780231160704
- Needham, Joseph (1986), Science & Civilisation in China, vol. V:7: The Gunpowder Epic, Cambridge University Press, ISBN 0-521-30358-3
- Rong, Xinjiang (2013), Eighteen Lectures on Dunhuang, Brill
- Schafer, Edward H. (1985), The Golden Peaches of Samarkand: A study of T'ang Exotics, University of California Press
- Shaban, M. A. (1979), The ʿAbbāsid Revolution, Cambridge: Cambridge University Press, ISBN 0-521-29534-3
- Sima, Guang (2015), Bóyángbǎn Zīzhìtōngjiàn 54 huánghòu shīzōng 柏楊版資治通鑑54皇后失蹤, Yuǎnliú chūbǎnshìyè gǔfèn yǒuxiàn gōngsī, ISBN 978-957-32-0876-1
- Skaff, Jonathan Karam (2012), Sui-Tang China and Its Turko-Mongol Neighbors: Culture, Power, and Connections, 580-800 (Oxford Studies in Early Empires), Oxford University Press
- Standen, Naomi (2007), Unbounded Loyalty Frontier Crossings in Liao China, University of Hawai'i Press
- Swope, Kenneth (2014), The Military Collapse of China's Ming Dynasty, Routledge
- Twitchett, Denis C. (1979), The Cambridge History of China, Vol. 3, Sui and T'ang China, 589–906, Cambridge University Press
- Twitchett, Denis (1994), "The Liao", The Cambridge History of China, Volume 6, Alien Regime and Border States, 907-1368, Cambridge: Cambridge University Press, pp. 43–153, ISBN 0521243319
- Twitchett, Denis (1998), The Cambridge History of China Volume 7 The Ming Dynasty, 1368—1644, Part I, Cambridge University Press
- Twitchett, Denis (1998b), The Cambridge History of China Volume 8 The Ming Dynasty, 1368—1644, Part 2, Cambridge University Press
- Peterson, Willard (2008), The Cambridge History of China Volume 9 The Ch'ing Empire to 1800, Part 1, Cambridge University Press
- Wakeman, Frederic (1985), The Great Enterprise: The Manchu Reconstruction of Imperial Order in Seventeenth-Century China, vol. 1, University of California Press
- Wang, Zhenping (2013), Tang China in Multi-Polar Asia: A History of Diplomacy and War, University of Hawaii Press
- Wilkinson, Endymion (2015), Chinese History: A New Manual, 4th edition, Cambridge, MA: Harvard University Asia Center distributed by Harvard University Press, ISBN 9780674088467
- Xiong, Victor Cunrui (2000), Sui-Tang Chang'an: A Study in the Urban History of Late Medieval China (Michigan Monographs in Chinese Studies), U OF M CENTER FOR CHINESE STUDIES, ISBN 0892641371
- Xiong, Victor Cunrui (2009), Historical Dictionary of Medieval China, United States of America: Scarecrow Press, Inc., ISBN 978-0810860537
- Jerr, Nicole (2017), The Scaffolding of Sovereignty: Global and Aesthetic Perspectives on the History of a Concept, Columbia University Press
- Xu, Elina-Qian (2005), HISTORICAL DEVELOPMENT OF THE PRE-DYNASTIC KHITAN, Institute for Asian and African Studies 7
- Xue, Zongzheng (1992), Turkic peoples, China Social Sciences Press
- Yuan, Shu (2001), Bóyángbǎn Tōngjiàn jìshìběnmò 28 dìèrcìhuànguánshídài 柏楊版通鑑記事本末28第二次宦官時代, Yuǎnliú chūbǎnshìyè gǔfèn yǒuxiàn gōngsī, ISBN 957-32-4273-7
- Yule, Henry (1915), Cathay and the Way Thither: Being a Collection of Medieval Notices of China, Vol I: Preliminary Essay on the Intercourse Between China and the Western Nations Previous to the Discovery of the Cape Route, Hakluyt Society
