= Seven Grievances =

1618 Manchu declaration of war against the Ming dynasty

The Seven Grievances (Note: Manchu: ᠨᠠᡩᠠᠨ ᡴᠣᡵᠣ nadan koro; Chinese: 七大恨; pinyin: Qī Dà Hèn; lit. 'Seven Great Resentments') was a manifesto announced by Nurhaci, khan of the Later Jin, on 7 May 1618. (Note: Sources give the thirteenth day of the fourth lunar month in the third year of the Tianming (天命; lit. 'Mandate of Heaven') era of his reign, in accordance with contemporary calendar conventions; 7 May 1618 is the corresponding date on the Gregorian calendar.) It effectively declared war against the Ming dynasty.

There were several accounts of the Seven Grievances, one from the Veritable Records of the Manchus, another from the Qing Veritable Records, and the one from Nurhaci's successor Hong Taiji. According to the last account, the seven grievances are:

1. The Ming killed Nurhaci's father and grandfather without reason;
2. The Ming suppressed Jianzhou and favored Yehe and Hada clans;
3. The Ming violated agreement of territories with Nurhaci;
4. The Ming sent troops to protect Yehe against Jianzhou;
5. The Ming supported Yehe to break its promise to Nurhaci;
6. The Ming forced Nurhaci to give up the lands in Chaihe, Sancha, and Fuan;
7. The Ming's official Shang Bozhi abused his power and rode roughshod over the people.

Shortly after the announcement of the Seven Grievances, the attack against the Ming on Fushun started. Han defectors played a very important role in the Qing conquest of Ming. Ethnic Han generals who defected to the Manchus were often given women from the imperial Aisin Gioro family in marriage while the ordinary soldiers who defected were often given non-royal Manchu women as wives. Nurhaci married one of his granddaughters to the Ming general Li Yongfang after the latter surrendered Fushun in Liaoning to the Manchus in 1618. The offspring of Li received the "Third Class Viscount" (三等子爵; Sān-děng Zǐjué) title. In retaliation, a year later, a Ming punitive force of about 100,000 men, which included Korean and Yehe troops, approached Nurhaci's Manchus along four different routes. The Manchus scored successive victories, the most decisive being the battle of Sarhu in which Nurhaci defeated Ming dynasty and Korean troops that were far superior in numbers and armaments.

The Ming dynasty was wearied by a combination of internal strife and constant harassment by the Manchu. On May 26, 1644, Beijing fell to a peasant rebel army led by Li Zicheng. During the turmoil, the last Ming emperor Zhu Youjian hanged himself on a tree in the imperial garden outside the Forbidden City. The Manchus then allied with Ming general Wu Sangui and seized control of Beijing and overthrew Li Zicheng's short-lived Shun dynasty, establishing the Qing dynasty rule in China.

== See also ==
- Manchuria under Ming rule
- Jurchen unification
- Transition from Ming to Qing
