= Wild Jurchens =

Exonymic term applied by Han Chinese to an ethnic group or groups

The Wild Jurchens (Chinese: 野人女真) or Haidong Jurchens (Chinese: 海東女真) were a group of the Tungusic peoples in Northeast Asia identified by the Ming dynasty as the northernmost of the three groups of Jurchen people (the other two being the Jianzhou Jurchens and Haixi Jurchens). In the 14th century, they inhabited the northernmost part of Greater Manchuria from the western side of the Greater Khingan Range to the Ussuri River and the lower Amur River bordered by the Tatar Strait and the Sea of Japan.

The descendants of Wild Jurchens do not identify themselves as Manchus. Instead, they formed different nations such as Nanai, Evenks, Negidals, Oroqen, and Nivkh.

== Etymology ==
The Wild Jurchens, as their name suggests, lived in the wilds. The word Yeren (野人) in Chinese means "wild people", i.e. "savages". The Yeren had been a general name for all Jurchens before the rise of Jianzhou Jurchens and Haixi Jurchens. As vassals to Ming China, Jianzhou and Haixi became closer with their Chinese suzerain while the rest of Jurchens who did not establish constant connection with the Ming are known as the wild Jurchens.

== See also ==
- Jurchen unification
- List of Manchu clans
- Sinicization of the Manchus
