= Jurchen people =

Tungusic-speaking people in East Asia

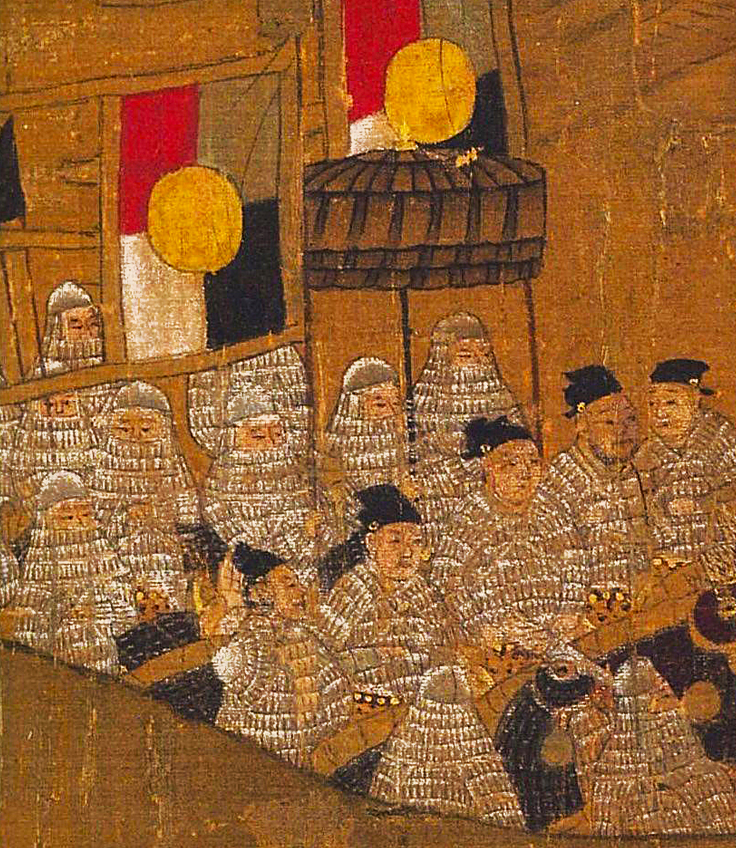
- Jurchens during the Jin dynasty

Chinese name
- Chinese: 女真
- Traditional Chinese: 女真/女眞
Transcriptions
Standard Mandarin
- Hanyu Pinyin: Nǚzhēn
- Wade–Giles: Nü^{3}-chên^{1}

South Korean name
- Hangul: 여진
Transcriptions
- Revised Romanization: Yeojin

North Korean name
- Chosŏn'gŭl: 녀진
Transcriptions
- McCune–Reischauer: Nyŏjin

Russian name
- Russian: Чжурчжэни
- Romanization: Chzhurchzheni

Khitan name
- Khitan: dʒuuldʒi (女直)

Mongolian name
- Mongolian: ᠵᠦ᠋ᠷᠴᠢᠳ; Зүрчид, Зөрчид, Жүрчид; Zürchid, Zörchid, Jürchid

Middle Chinese name
- Middle Chinese: /ɳɨʌX t͡ɕiɪn/

Jurchen (Manchu: ᠵᡠᡧᡝᠨ, romanized: Jušen, [dʒuʃən]; Chinese: 女真, romanized: Nǚzhēn, [nỳ.ʈʂə́n]) were a number of East Asian Tungusic-speaking people. (Note: In the past, scholars such as Jean-Pierre Abel-Rémusat (apud Viktorova, 1980) Fan Zuoguai and Han Feimu (apud Zarrow, 2015) proposed that the Jurchens and other Tungusic peoples descended from the Donghu people; this proposal has been critiqued by ethnographer Lydia Viktorova and sinologist-linguist Edwin G. Pulleyblankas being based on merely phonetic similarity between Tungus and modern Mandarin pronunciation Dōnghú; Tung-hu (IPA: [tʊ́ŋ.xǔ]) of 东胡; 東胡.) They lived in northeastern China, also known as Manchuria, before the 18th century. Hong Taiji renamed the Jurchens as Manchus in 1635. The Jurchens were culturally diverse, with different groups living as hunter-gatherers, pastoralist semi-nomads, or sedentary agriculturists. Generally lacking a central authority, and having little communication with each other, many Jurchen groups fell under the influence of neighbouring dynasties, their chiefs paying tribute and holding nominal posts as effectively hereditary commanders of border guards.

The Jurchens are chiefly known for establishing the Jin (1115–1234) and Qing (1636–1912) conquest dynasties on Chinese territory. The latter dynasty, originally calling itself the Later Jin, was founded by a Jianzhou commander, Nurhaci (r. 1616–26), who unified most Jurchen tribes, incorporated their entire population into hereditary military regiments known as the Eight Banners, and patronized the creation of an alphabet for their language based on the Mongolian script. The term Manchu, already in official use by the Later Jin at that time, was in 1635 decreed to be the sole acceptable name for that people.

== Classification ==
Han officials of the Ming dynasty (1368–1644) classified them into three groups, reflecting relative proximity to the Ming:

1. Jianzhou (Chinese: 建州) Jurchens, some of whom were mixed with Chinese populations, lived in the proximity of the Mudan River, the Changbai mountains, and Liaodong. They were noted as able to sew clothes similar to the Chinese, and lived by hunting and fishing, sedentary agriculture, and trading in pearls and ginseng.
2. Haixi (Chinese: 海西) Jurchens, named after the Haixi or Songhua River, included several populous and independent tribes, largely divided between semi-nomadic pastoralists in the west and sedentary agriculturalists in the east. They were the Jurchens most strongly influenced by the Mongols.
3. Yeren (Chinese: 野人, lit. 'Wild People,' or, 'savage,' 'barbarian'), a term sometimes used by Chinese and Korean commentators to refer to all Jurchens. It more specifically referred to the inhabitants of the sparsely populated north of Manchuria beyond the Liao and Songhua river valleys, supporting themselves by hunting, fishing, pig farming, and some migratory agriculture.

Many "Yeren Jurchens", like the Nivkh (speaking a language isolate), Negidai, Nanai, Oroqen, and many Evenks, are today considered distinct ethnic groups. In Outer Manchuria, some Han Chinese men married the local "Yeren Jurchen" women, and their mixed Sinitic-Tungusic descendants became the Taz people.

== Name ==
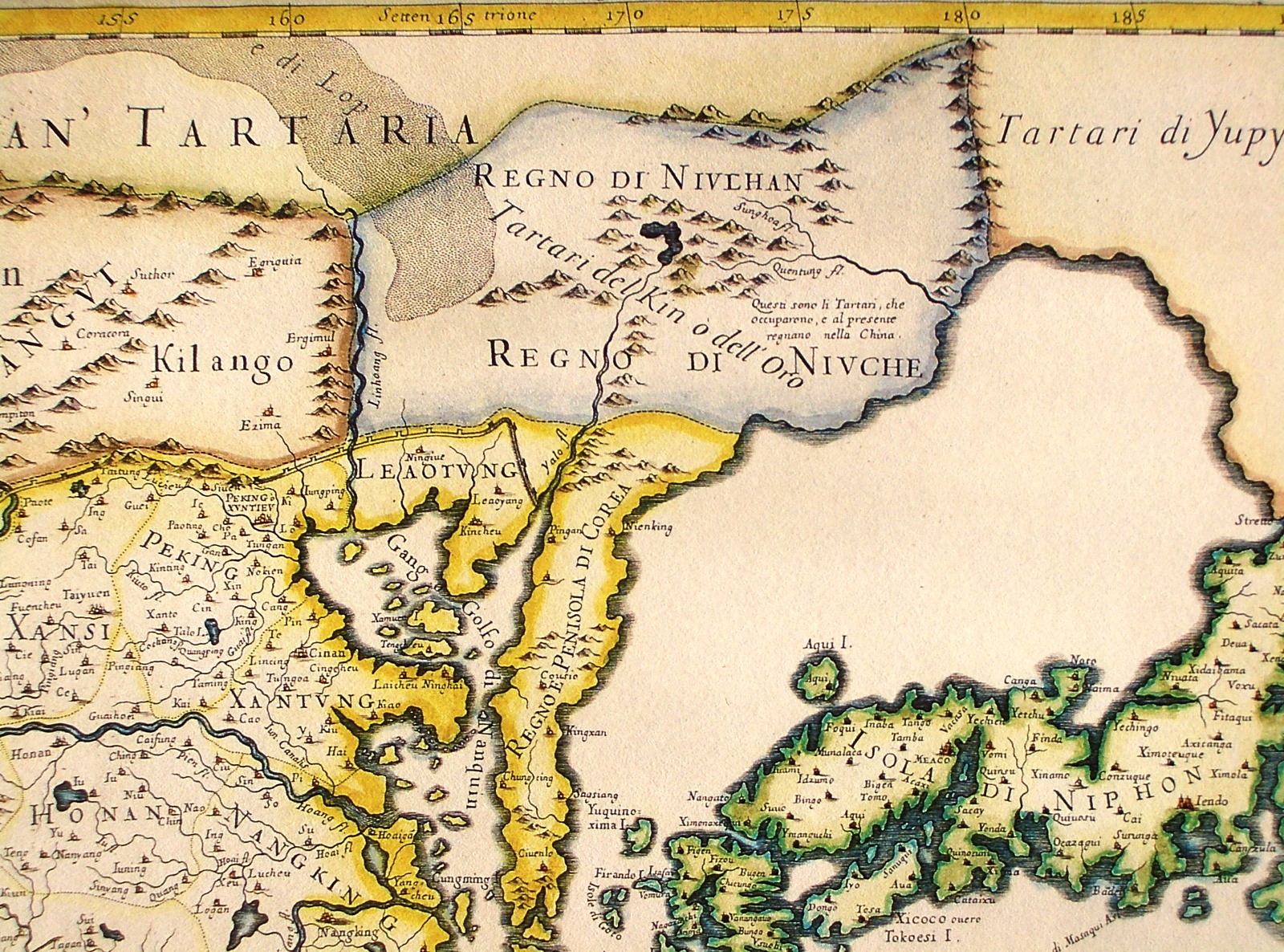
A 1682 Italian map showing the "Kingdom of the Niuche" (i.e., Nǚzhēn) or the "Kin (Jin) Tartars", who "have occupied and are at present ruling China", north of Liaodong and Korea

=== Lüzhen/Nüzhen ===
The name Jurchen is derived from a long line of other variations of the same name.

The initial Khitan form of the name was Lüzhen. The variant Nrjo-tsyin (now Chinese: 女真 Nüzhen, whence English Nurchen) appeared in the 10th century under the Liao dynasty. The Jurchens were also interchangeably known as the Nrjo-drik (now Chinese: 女直 Nüzhi). This is traditionally explained as an effect of the naming taboo, with the character 真 being removed after the 1031 enthronement of Zhigu, Emperor Xingzong of Liao, because it appeared in the sinified form of his personal name, Zongzhen. Aisin Gioro Ulhicun, however, argues that this was a later folk etymology and the original reason was uncertainty among dialects regarding the name's final -n.

The form Niuche was introduced to the West by Martino Martini in his 1654 work De bello tartarico historia, and it soon appeared, e.g., on the 1660 world map by Nicolas Sanson.

=== Jurchen ===
Jurchen is an anglicization of Jurčen, an attempted reconstruction of this unattested original form of the native name, which has been transcribed into Middle Chinese as Tsyu-li-tsyin (朱理真; Pinyin: Zhūlǐzhēn (Note: The Japanese government and Franke give the modern Mandarin pronunciation Zhulizhen.)) and into Khitan small script as Julisen. The ethnonyms Sushen (Old Chinese: 肅慎 */siwk-[d]i[n]-s/) and Jizhen (稷真, Old Chinese: */tsək-ti[n]/) recorded in geographical works like the Classic of Mountains and Seas and the Book of Wei are possibly cognates. It was the source of Fra Mauro's Zorça and Marco Polo's Ciorcia, reflecting the Persian form of their name. Vajda considers that the Jurchens' name probably derives from the Tungusic words for "reindeer people" and is cognate with the names of the Orochs of Khabarovsk Province and the Oroks of Sakhalin. ("Horse Tungus" and "Reindeer Tungus" are still the primary divisions among the Tungusic cultures.)

Janhunen argues that these records already reflect the Classical Mongolian plural form of the name, recorded in the Secret History as J̌ürčät, and further reconstructed as *Jörcid, The modern Mongolian form is Зүрчид (Zürčid) whose medial -r- does not appear in the later Jurchen Jucen or Jušen (Jurchen:) (Note: First attested in a late 15th-century glossary for the Ming Bureau of Translators.) or Manchu Jushen (Jussin). In Manchu, this word was more often used to describe the serfs—though not slaves—of the free Manchu people, who were themselves mostly the former Jurchens. To describe the historical people who founded the Jin dynasty, they reborrowed the Mongolian name as Jurcit.

In the dictionary "Complete Manchu-Russian dictionary" by Ivan Zakharov, the word чжурчэнь (Jurchen’) is defined as resistance, disobedience, insubordination (сопротивление, непослушание, непокорность).

== Appearance ==
According to William of Rubruck, the Jurchens were "swarthy like Spaniards."

Sin Chung-il, a Korean emissary who in 1595 had visited the Jurchen living north-west of the Yalu River, notes that during his visit to Fe Ala all those who served Nurhaci were uniform in their dress and hairstyle. They all shaved a portion of their scalp and kept the remaining hair in a long plaited braid. All men wore leather boots, breeches, and tunics.

== History ==
=== Origin ===
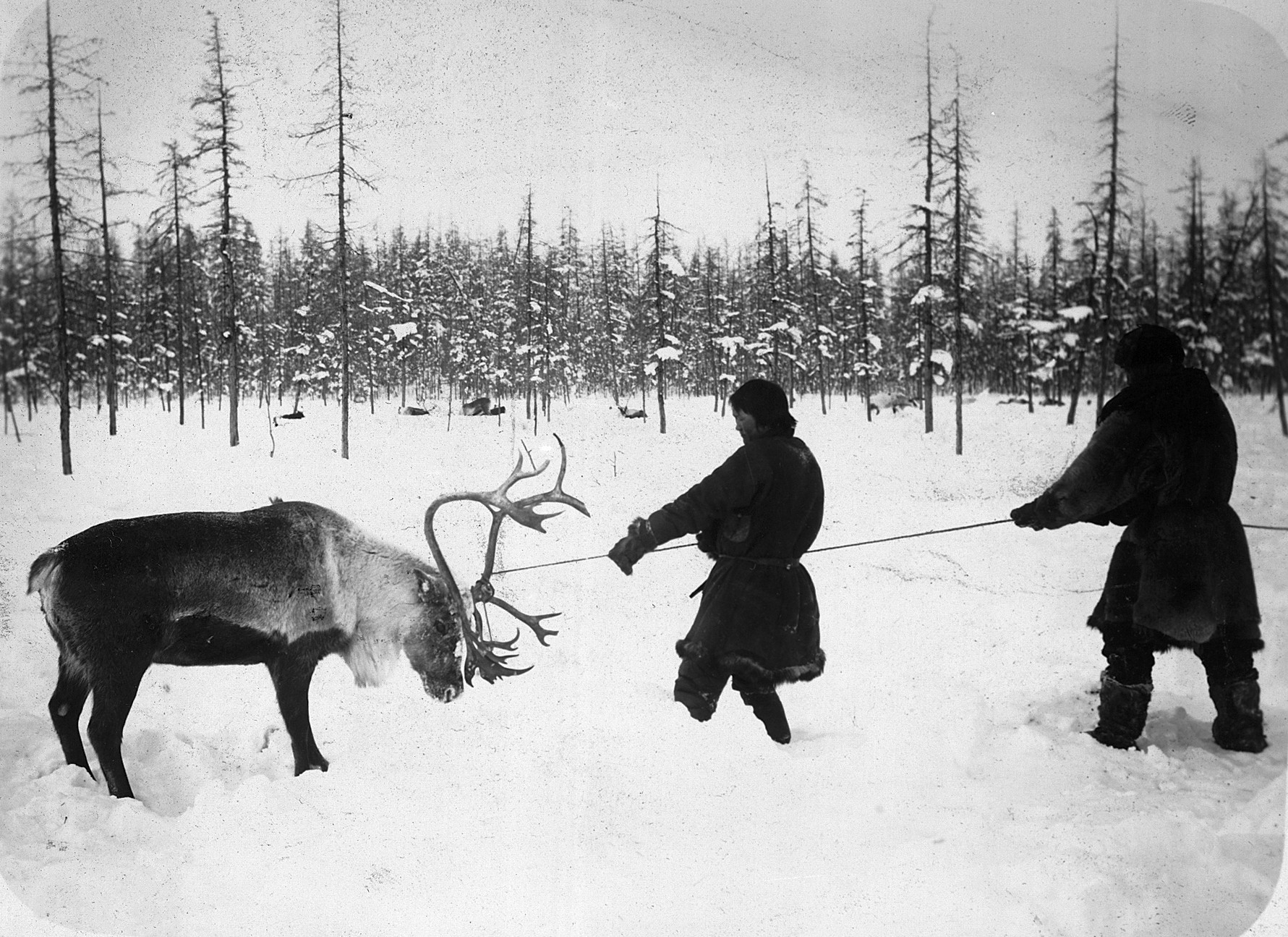
Siberians capturing a reindeer

==== Mohe origin ====
When the Jurchens first entered Chinese records in 748, they inhabited the forests and river valleys of the land which is now divided between China's Heilongjiang Province and Russia's Primorsky Krai. In earlier records, this area was known as the home of the Sushen (c. 1100 BC), the Yilou (around AD 200), the Wuji (c. 500), and the Mohe (c. 700). Scholarship since the Qing period traces the origin of the Jurchens to the "Wanyen tribe of the Mohos" around Mt. Xiaobai, or to the Heishui or Blackwater Mohe, and some sources stress the continuity between these earlier peoples with the Jurchen but this remains conjectural.

The tentative ancestors of the Jurchens, the Tungusic Mohe tribes, were people of the multi-ethnic kingdom of Balhae. The Mohe enjoyed eating pork, practiced pig farming extensively, and were mainly sedentary. They used both pig and dog skins for coats. They were predominantly farmers and grew soybean, wheat, millet, and rice in addition to hunting. The Mohe practiced slavery. Horses were rare in the region they inhabited until the 10th century under the domination of the Khitans. The Mohe rode reindeer.

==== Wanyan origin ====
There is no dated evidence of the Jurchens before the time of Wugunai (1021–74), when the Jurchens began to coalesce into a nation-like federation. According to tradition passed down via oral transmission, Wugunai was the 6th generation descendant of Hanpu, the founder of the Wanyan clan, who therefore must have lived around the year 900. Hanpu originally came from the Heishui Mohe tribe of Balhae. According to the History of Jin, when he came to the Wanyan tribe, it was for the repayment of a murder and a form of compensation. He had two brothers, one who stayed in Goryeo and the other in Balhae when he left. By the time he arrived and settled among the Wanyan, he was already 60 years old and accepted as a "wise man". He succeeded in settling a dispute between two families without resorting to violence, and as a reward, was betrothed to a worthy unmarried maiden also 60 years old. The marriage was blessed with the gift of a dark ox, which was revered in Jurchen culture, and from this union came one daughter and three sons. With this, Hanpu became the chief of the Wanyan and his descendants became formal members of the Wanyan clan.

Because Hanpu arrived from Goryeo, some South Korean scholars have claimed that Hanpu hailed from Goryeo. According to Alexander Kim, this cannot be easily identified as him being Korean because many Balhae people lived in Goryeo at that time. Later when Aguda appealed to the Balhae people in the Liao dynasty for support by emphasizing their common origin, he only mentioned those who descended from the "seven Wuji tribes", which the Goguryeo people were not a part of. It seems by that point, the Jurchens saw only the Mohe tribes as a related people. Some western scholars consider the origin of Hanpu to be legendary in nature. Herbert Franke described the narrative provided in the History of Jin as an "ancestral legend" with a historical basis in that the Wanyan clan had absorbed immigrants from Goryeo and Balhae during the 10th century. Frederick W. Mote described it as a "tribal legend" that may have born the tribe's memories. The two brothers remaining in Goryeo and Balhae may represent ancestral ties to those two peoples while Hanpu's marriage may represent the tribe's transformation from a matrilineal to patrilineal society.

==== Qing origin ====
Hongtaiji, the Qing dynasty emperor of the Aisin Gioro clan, claimed that their progenitor, Bukūri Yongšon (布庫里雍順), was conceived from a virgin birth. According to the legend, three heavenly maidens, namely Enggulen (恩古倫), Jenggulen (正古倫) and Fekulen (佛庫倫), were bathing at a lake called Bulhūri Omo near the Changbai Mountains. A magpie dropped a piece of red fruit near Fekulen, who ate it. She then became pregnant with Bukūri Yongšon. However, another older version of the story by the Hurha (Hurka) tribe member Muksike recorded in 1635 contradicts Hongtaiji's version on location, claiming that it was in Heilongjiang province close to the Amur river where Bulhuri lake was located where the "heavenly maidens" took their bath. This was recorded in the Jiu Manzhou Dang and is much shorter and simpler in addition to being older. This is believed to be the original version and Hongtaiji changed it to the Changbai mountains. It shows that the Aisin Gioro clan originated in the Amur area and the Heje (Hezhen) and other Amur valley Jurchen tribes had an oral version of the same tale. It also fits with Jurchen history since some ancestors of the Manchus originated north before the 14th-15th centuries in the Amur and only later moved south.

=== Liao vassals ===
By the 11th century, the Jurchens had become vassals of the Khitan rulers of the Liao dynasty. The Jurchens in the Yalu River region had been tributaries of Goryeo since the reign of Wang Geon, who called upon them during the wars of the Later Three Kingdoms period, but the Jurchens opportunistically switched allegiance between Liao and Goryeo multiple times. They offered tribute to both courts out of political necessity and the desire for material benefits.

In 1019, Jurchen pirates raided Japan for slaves. The Jurchen pirates slaughtered Japanese men while seizing Japanese women as prisoners. Fujiwara Notada, the Japanese governor, was killed. In total, 1,280 Japanese were taken prisoner, 374 Japanese were killed and 380 Japanese owned livestock were killed for food. Only 259 or 270 were returned by Koreans from the eight ships. Uchikura no Ishime, a Japanese woman, left behind a report which was copied down.

One of the causes of the Jurchen rebellion and the fall of the Liao was the Khitan custom of forcing married Jurchen women and Jurchen girls to provide sexual services to Khitan envoys, which caused resentment from the Jurchens. The custom of taking unmarried girls for sexual services was not by itself a source of resentment, since the practice of guest prostitution - giving female companions, food and shelter to guests - was common among Jurchens. Unmarried daughters of Jurchen families of lower and middle classes in Jurchen villages were provided to Khitan messengers for sexual services, as recorded by Hong Hao. Song envoys among the Jin were similarly entertained by singing girls in Guide, Henan. Hence, there is no evidence that guest prostitution of unmarried Jurchen girls to Khitan men encountered Jurchen objections. However, when the Khitans forced aristocratic Jurchen families to give up their wives as guest prostitutes to Khitan messengers, the Jurchens became resentful. This suggests that in Jurchen upper classes, only a husband had the right to his married wife while among lower class Jurchens, the virginity of unmarried girls and sex with Khitan men did not impede their ability to marry later.

The Jurchens and their Manchu descendants had Khitan linguistic and grammatical elements in their personal names, such as suffixes; many Khitan names had a "ju" suffix.

=== Goryeo-Jurchen war ===
The Jurchens in the Yalu River region were tributaries of Goryeo since the reign of Taejo of Goryeo (r. 918-943), who called upon them during the wars of the Later Three Kingdoms period. Taejo relied heavily on a large Jurchen cavalry force to defeat Later Baekje. The Jurchens switched allegiances between Liao and Goryeo multiple times depending on which alliance they deemed the most beneficial. The Liao and Goryeo competed to gain the allegiance of Jurchen settlers who effectively controlled much of the border area beyond Goryeo and Liao fortifications. These Jurchens offered tribute but expected to be rewarded richly by the Goryeo court in return. However the Jurchens who offered tribute were often the same ones who raided Goryeo's borders. In one instance, the Goryeo court discovered that a Jurchen leader who had brought tribute had been behind the recent raids on their territory. The frontier was largely outside of direct control and lavish gifts were doled out as a means of controlling the Jurchens. Sometimes Jurchens submitted to Goryeo and were given citizenship. Goryeo inhabitants were forbidden from trading with Jurchens.

The tributary relations between Jurchens and Goryeo began to change under the reign of Jurchen leader Wuyashu (r. 1103–1113) of the Wanyan clan. The Wanyan clan was intimately aware of the Jurchens who had submitted to Goryeo and used their power to break the clans' allegiance to Goryeo, unifying the Jurchens. The resulting conflict between the two powers led to Goryeo's withdrawal from Jurchen territory and acknowledgment of Jurchen control over the contested region.

As the geopolitical situation shifted, Goryeo unleashed a series of military campaigns in the early 12th century to regain control of its borderlands. Goryeo had already been in conflict with the Jurchens before. In 984, Goryeo failed to control the Yalu River basin due to conflict with the Jurchens. In 1056, Goryeo repelled the Eastern Jurchens and afterward destroyed their stronghold of over 20 villages. In 1080, Munjong of Goryeo led a force of 30,000 to conquer ten villages. However by the rise of the Wanyan clan, the quality of Goryeo's army had degraded and it mostly consisted of infantry. There were several clashes with the Jurchens, usually resulting in Jurchen victory with their mounted cavalrymen. In 1104, the Wanyan Jurchens reached Chongju while pursuing tribes resisting them. Goryeo sent Lim Gan to confront the Jurchens, but his untrained army was defeated, and the Jurchens took Chongju castle. Lim Gan was dismissed from office and reinstated, dying as a civil servant in 1112. The war effort was taken up by Yun Kwan, but the situation was unfavorable and he returned after making peace.

Yun Kwan believed that the loss was due to their inferior cavalry and proposed to the king that an elite force known as the Byeolmuban (別武班; "Special Warfare Army") be created. it existed apart from the main army and was made up of cavalry, infantry, and a Hangmagun ("Subdue Demon Corps"). In December 1107, Yun Kwan and O Yŏnch’on set out with 170,000 soldiers to conquer the Jurchens. The army won against the Jurchens and built Nine Fortresses over a wide area on the frontier encompassing Jurchen tribal lands, and erected a monument to mark the boundary. However due to unceasing Jurchen attacks, diplomatic appeals, and court intrigue, the Nine Fortresses were handed back to the Jurchens. In 1108, Yun Kwan was removed from office and the Nine Fortresses were turned over to the Wanyan clan. It is plausible that the Jurchens and Goryeo had some sort of implicit understanding where the Jurchens would cease their attacks while Goryeo took advantage of the conflict between the Jurchens and Khitans to gain territory. According to Breuker, Goryeo never really had control of the region occupied by the Nine Fortresses in the first place and maintaining hegemony would have meant a prolonged conflict with militarily superior Jurchen troops that would prove very costly. The Nine Fortresses were exchanged for Poju (Uiju), a region the Jurchens later contested when Goryeo hesitated to recognize them as their suzerain.

Later, Wuyashu's younger brother Aguda founded the Jin dynasty (1115–1234). When the Jin was founded, the Jurchens called Goryeo their "parent country" or "father and mother" country. This reference was used because it had traditionally been part of their system of tributary relations, its rhetoric, advanced culture, as well as the idea that it was "bastard offspring of Koryŏ". The Jin also believed that they shared a common ancestry with the Balhae people in the Liao dynasty. The Jin went on to conquer the Liao dynasty in 1125 and capture the Song capital of Kaifeng in 1127 (Jingkang incident). The Jin also put pressure on Goryeo and demanded that Goryeo become their subject. While many in Goryeo were against this, Yi Cha-gyöm was in power at the time and judged peaceful relations with the Jin to be beneficial to his own political power. He accepted the Jin demands and in 1126, the king of Goryeo declared himself a Jin vassal (tributary). However the Goryeo king retained his position as "Son of Heaven" within Goryeo. By incorporating Jurchen history into that of Goryeo and emphasizing the Jin emperors as bastard offspring of Goryeo, and placing the Jin within the template of a "northern dynasty", the imposition of Jin suzerainty became more acceptable.

=== Jin dynasty ===
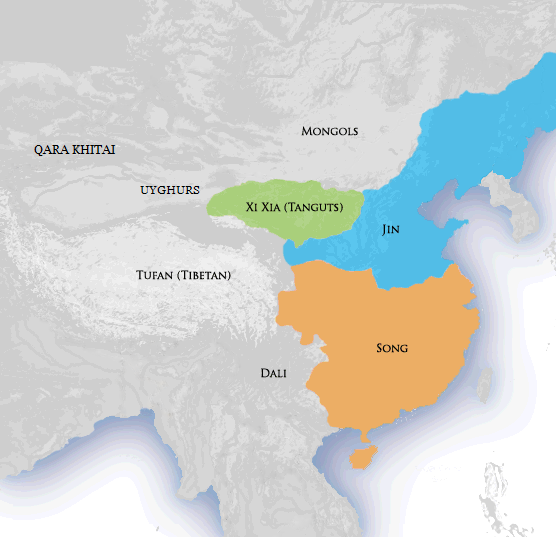
China in c. 1141.

Wanyan Aguda, chief of the Wanyan tribe, unified the various Jurchen tribes in 1115 and declared himself emperor. In 1120 he seized Shangjing, also known as Linhuang Prefecture (臨潢府), the northern capital of the Liao dynasty. During the Jin–Song Wars, the Jurchens invaded the Northern Song dynasty and overran most of northern China. The Jurchens initially created the puppet regimes of Da Qi and Da Chu but later adopted a dynastic name and became known as "Jin" 金, which means "gold", not to be confused with the earlier Jin 晋 dynasties named after the region around Shanxi and Henan provinces. The name of the Jurchen dynasty in Chinese — meaning "gold"—is derived from the "Gold River" (Jurchen: antʃu-un; Manchu: Aisin) in their ancestral homeland. The Jurchens who settled into urban communities eventually intermarried with other ethnicities in China. The Jin rulers themselves came to follow Confucian norms. The Jin dynasty captured the Northern Song dynasty's capital, Bianjing, in 1127. Their armies pushed the Song all the way south to the Yangtze River and eventually settled on a border with the Southern Song dynasty along the Huai River.

Poor Jurchen families in the southern Routes (Daming and Shandong) Battalion and Company households tried to live the lifestyle of wealthy Jurchen families and avoid doing farming work by selling their own Jurchen daughters into slavery and renting their land to Han tenants. The Wealthy Jurchens feasted and drank and wore damask and silk. The History of Jin (Jinshi) says that Emperor Shizong of Jin took note and attempted to halt these things in 1181.

After 1189, the Jin dynasty became increasingly involved in conflicts with the Mongols. By 1215, after losing much territory to the Mongols, the Jurchens moved their capital south from Zhongdu to Kaifeng. The Jin emperor Wanyan Yongji's daughter, Jurchen Princess Qiguo was married to Mongol leader Genghis Khan in exchange for relieving the Mongol siege upon Zhongdu. After a siege lasting about a year, Kaifeng fell to the Mongols in 1233. Emperor Aizong fled to Caizhou for shelter, but Caizhou also fell to the Mongols in 1234, marking the end of the Jin dynasty.

=== Ming dynasty ===
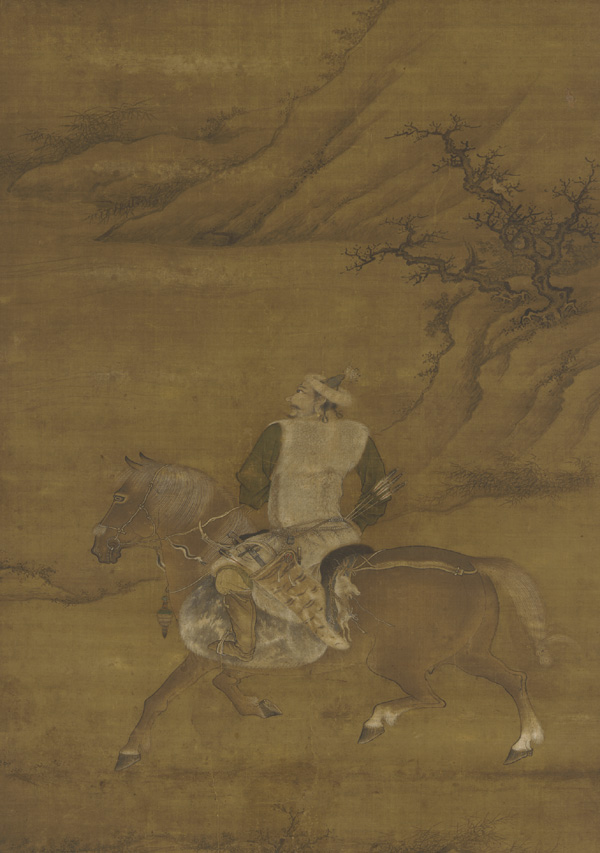
A Jurchen man hunting from his horse, from a 15th-century ink and color painting on silk.

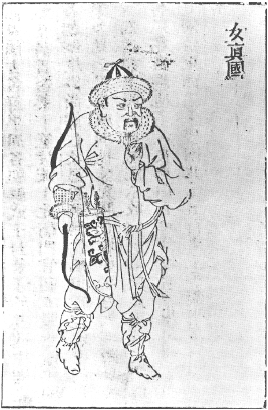
A late Ming era woodblock print of a Jurchen warrior.

Chinese chroniclers of the Ming dynasty distinguished three different groups of Jurchens: the Wild Jurchens (野人女真; yěrén Nǚzhēn) of what became Outer Manchuria, the Haixi Jurchens (海西女真) of modern Heilongjiang Province and the Jianzhou Jurchens of modern Jilin Province. They led a pastoral-agrarian lifestyle, hunting, fishing, and engaging in limited agriculture. In 1388, the Hongwu Emperor dispatched a mission to establish contact with the Odoli, Huligai and T'owen tribes.

The issue of controlling the Jurchens was a point of contention between Joseon Korea and the early Ming.

The Yongle Emperor (r. 1402–1424) found allies among the various Jurchen tribes against the Mongols. He bestowed titles and surnames to various Jurchen chiefs and expected them to send periodic tribute. One of the Yongle Emperor's consorts was a Jurchen princess, which resulted in some of the eunuchs serving him being of Jurchen origin.

Chinese commanderies were established over tribal military units under their own hereditary tribal leaders. In the Yongle period, 178 commanderies were set up in Manchuria. Later on, horse markets were established in the northern border towns of Liaodong. Increased contact with the Chinese gave Jurchens the more complex and sophisticated organizational structures.

The Koreans dealt with the Jurchen military through appeals to material benefits and launching punitive expeditions. To appease them the Joseon court handed out titles and degrees, trading with them, and sought to acculturate them by having Korean women marry Jurchens and integrating them into Korean culture. These measures were unsuccessful and fighting continued between the Jurchen and the Koreans. This relationship between the Jurchens and Koreans was ended by the Ming which envisioned the Jurchens as a form of protective border to the north. In 1403, Ahacu, chieftain of Huligai, paid tribute to the Yongle Emperor. Soon after, Mentemu, chieftain of Odoli clan of the Jianzhou Jurchens, defected from paying tribute to Korea, becoming a tributary to China instead. Yi Seong-gye, the first ruler of Joseon, asked the Ming dynasty to send Mentemu back but was refused. The Yongle Emperor was determined to wrest the Jurchens out of Korean influence and have China dominate them instead. The Koreans tried to persuade Mentemu to reject the Ming dynasty's overtures but were unsuccessful. The Jurchen tribes presented tribute to the Ming dynasty in succession. They were divided in 384 guards by the Ming dynasty and the Jurchen became vassals to the Ming emperors. The name given to the Jurchen land by the Ming dynasty was Nurgan. Later, a Korean army led by Yi-Il and Yi Sun-sin would expel them from Korea.

In 1409, the Ming government created the Nurgan Command Post (奴兒干都司) at Telin (present-day Tyr, Russia, about 100 km upstream from Nikolayevsk-on-Amur in the Russian Far East) in the vicinity of Heilongjiang. The Jurchens came under the nominal administration of the Nurgan Command Post which lasted only 25 years and was abolished in 1434. Leaders of the Haixi and Jianzhou tribes did, however, accept the Ming titles.

From 1411 to 1433, the Ming eunuch Yishiha (who himself was a Haixi Jurchen) led ten large missions to win over the allegiance of the Jurchen tribes along the Songhua River and Amur River. His fleet sailed down the Songhua into the Amur, and set up the Nurgan Command at Telin near the mouth of the Amur River. These missions are not well recorded in the Ming histories, but there exist two stone steles erected by Yishiha at the site of the Yongning Temple, a Guanyin temple commissioned by him at Telin. The inscriptions on the steles are in four languages: Chinese, Jurchen, Mongol, and Tibetan. There is probably quite a lot of propaganda in the inscriptions, but they give a detailed record of the Ming court's efforts to assert suzerainty over the Jurchen. When Yishiha visited Nurgan for the 3rd time in 1413, he built a temple called Yongning Temple at Telin and erected the Yongning Temple Stele in front of it. Yishiha paid his 10th visit to Nurgan in 1432, during which he rebuilt the Yongning Temple and re-erected a stele in front of it. The stele bore the heading "Record of Re-building Yongning Temple". The setting up of the Nurgan Command Post and the repeated declarations to offer blessings to this region by Yishiha and others were all recorded in this and the first steles.

In the ninth year of the Ming Xuande Emperor, the Jurchens in Manchuria under Ming rule suffered from famine forcing them to sell their daughters into slavery and moving to Liaodong to beg for help and relief from the Ming dynasty government.

=== Establishment of the Manchus ===
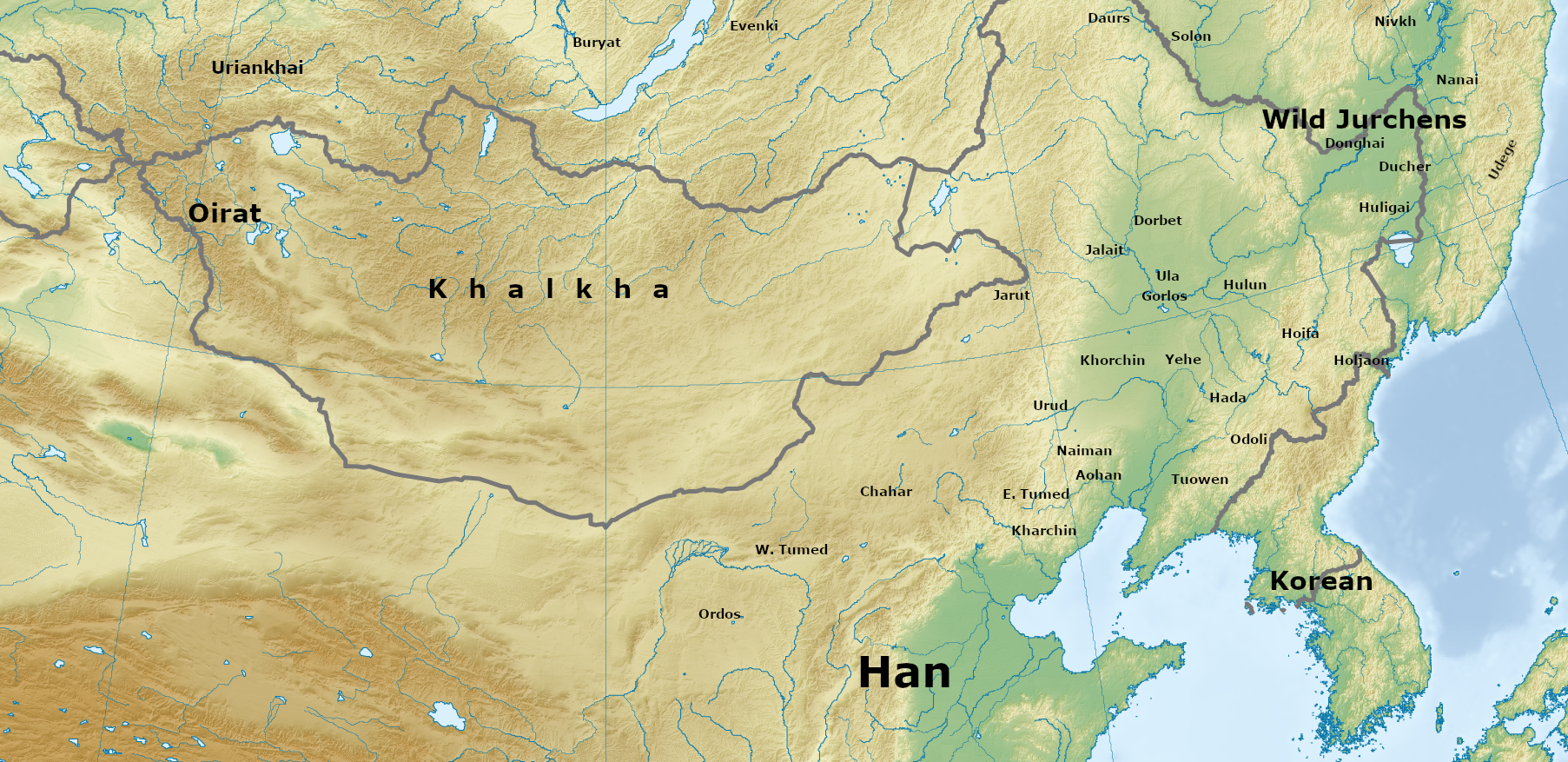
Ethnic map prior to Jurchen unification

Over a period of 30 years from 1586, Nurhaci, a chieftain of the Jianzhou Jurchens, united the Jurchen tribes. In 1635, his son and successor, Hong Taiji, renamed his people the Manchus as a clear break from their past as Chinese vassals. During the Ming dynasty, the Koreans of Joseon referred to the Jurchen-inhabited lands north of the Korean peninsula, above the rivers Yalu and Tumen as part of the "superior country" (sangguk) which they called Ming China. The Qing deliberately excluded references and information that showed the Jurchens (Manchus) as subservient to the Ming dynasty, when composing the History of Ming to hide their former subservient relationship. The Ming Veritable Records were not used to source content on Jurchens during Ming rule in the History of Ming because of this. The Yongzheng Emperor attempted to rewrite the historical record and claim that the Aisin Gioro were never subjects of past dynasties and empires trying to cast Nurhaci's acceptance of Ming titles like Dragon Tiger General (longhu jiangjun 龍虎將軍) by claiming he accepted to "please Heaven".

During the Qing dynasty, the two original editions of the books of the "Qing Taizu Wu Huangdi Shilu" and the "Manzhou Shilu Tu" (Taizu Shilu Tu) were kept in the palace, forbidden from public view because they showed that the Manchu Aisin Gioro family had been ruled by the Ming dynasty.

Our gurun (tribe, state) originally had the names Manju, Hada, Ula, Yehe, and Hoifa. Formerly ignorant persons have frequently called [us] jušen. The term jušen refers to the Coo Mergen of Sibe barbarians and has nothing to do with our gurun. Our gurun establishes the name Manju. Its rule will be long and transmitted over many generations. Henceforth persons should call our gurun its original name, Manju, and not use the previous demeaning name.

— Hong Taiji

== Culture ==
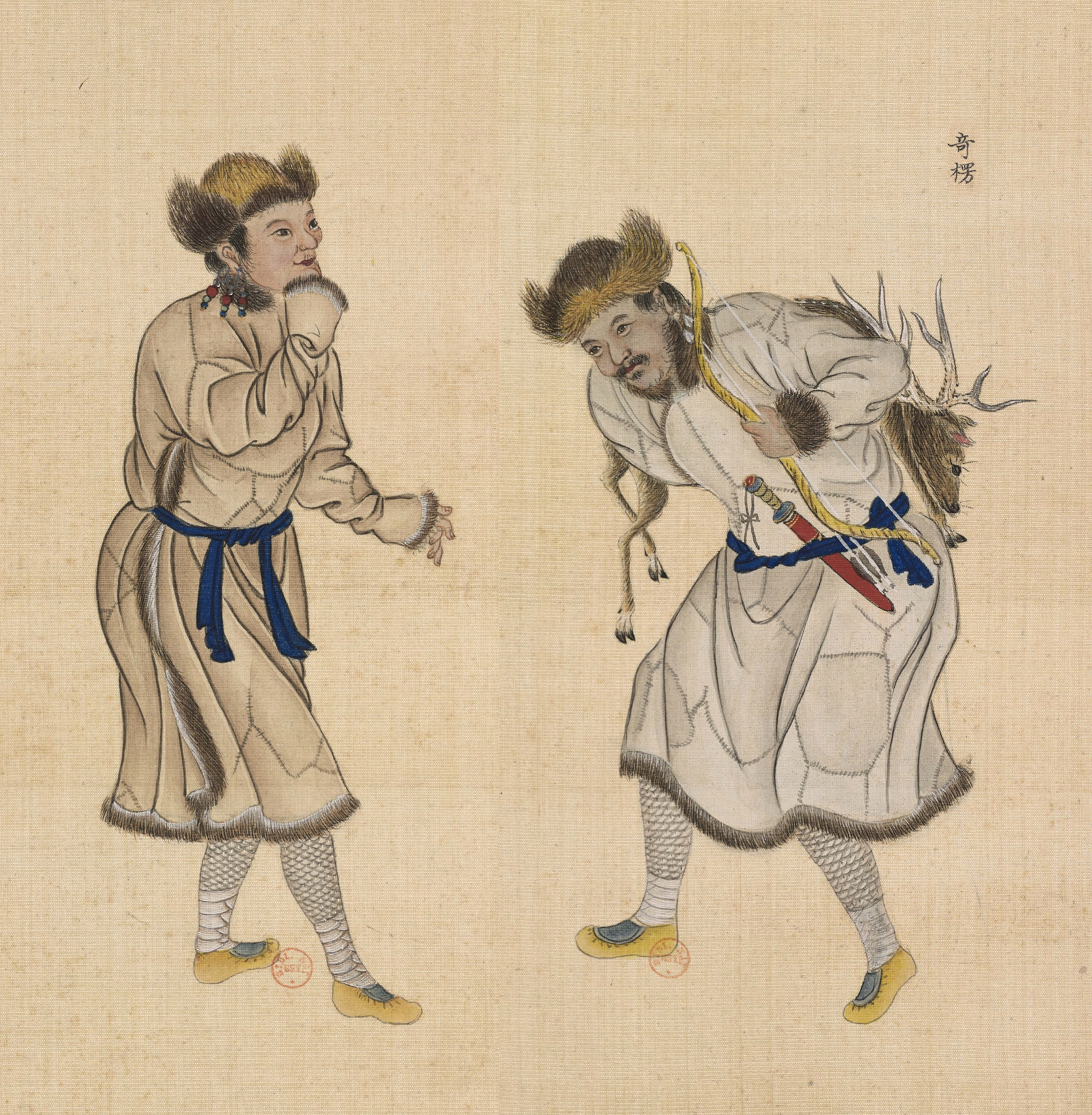
Qilang people (奇楞). Huang Qing Zhigong Tu, 1769

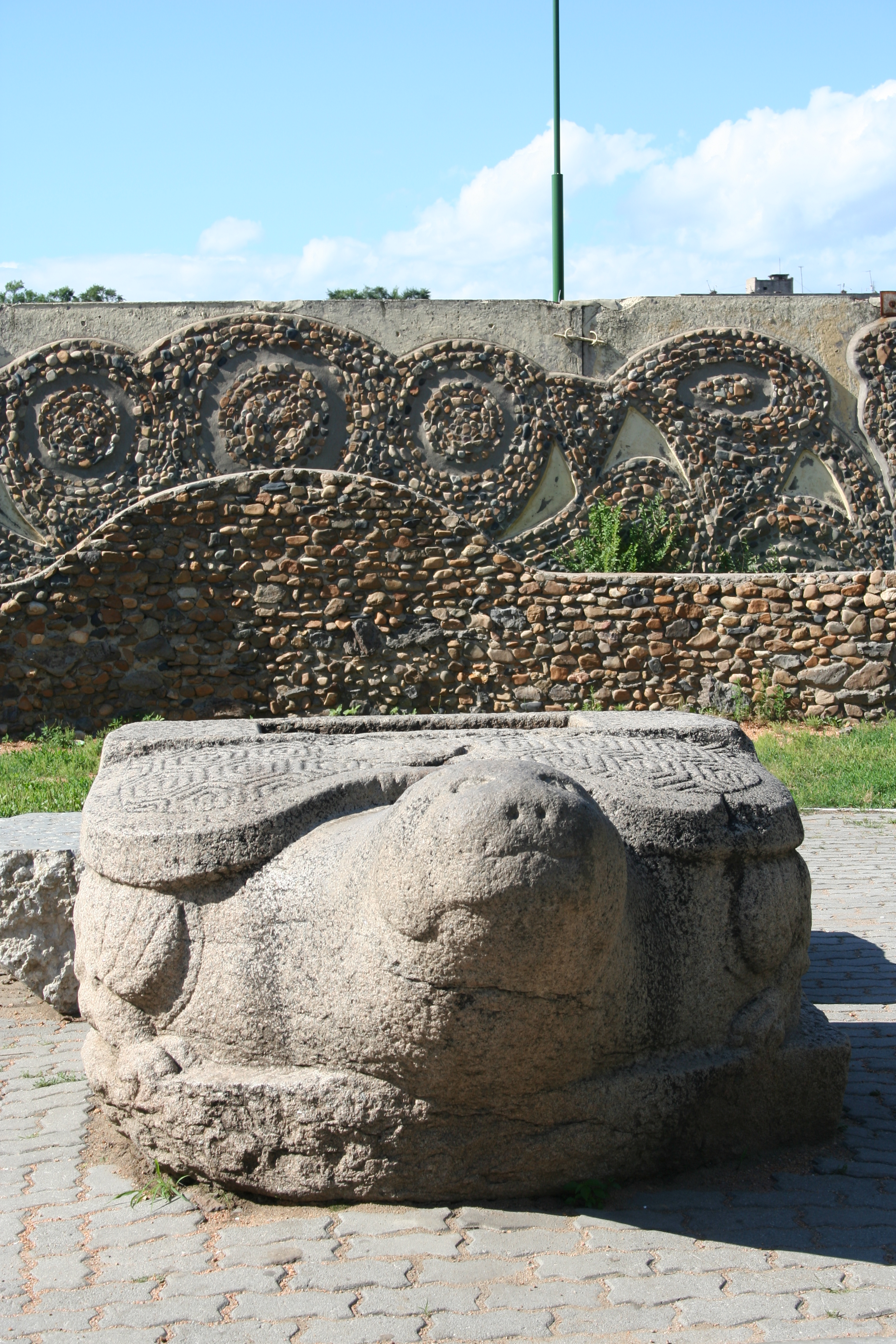
Bixi from the grave of a 12th-century Jurchen leader in today's Ussuriysk

Jurchen culture shared many similarities with the hunter-gatherer lifestyle of Siberian-Manchurian tundra and coastal peoples. Like the Khitans and Mongols, they took pride in feats of strength, horsemanship, archery, and hunting. Both Mongols and Jurchens used the title Khan for the leaders of a political entity, whether "emperor" or "chief". A particularly powerful chief was called beile ("prince, nobleman"), corresponding with the Mongolian beki and Turkic baig or bey. Also like the Mongols and the Turks, the Jurchens did not observe primogeniture. According to tradition, any capable son or nephew could be chosen to become leader.

Unlike the Mongols, the Jurchens were a sedentary and agrarian society. They farmed grain and millet as their primary cereal crops, grew flax, and raised oxen, pigs, sheep, and horses. "At the most", the Jurchen could only be described as "semi-nomadic" while the majority of them were sedentary.

Jurchen similarities and differences with the Mongols were emphasized to various degrees by Nurhaci out of political expediency. Nurhaci once said to the Mongols that "the languages of the Chinese and Koreans are different, but their clothing and way of life is the same. It is the same with us Manchus (Jušen) and Mongols. Our languages are different, but our clothing and way of life is the same." Later, Nurhaci indicated that the bond with the Mongols was not based on any real shared culture, but rather on pragmatic reasons of "mutual opportunism". He said to the Mongols, "You Mongols raise livestock, eat meat and wear pelts. My people till the fields and live on grain. We two are not one country and we have different languages".

During the Ming dynasty, the Jurchens lived in sub-clans (mukun or hala mukun) of ancient clans (hala). Not all clan members were blood related, and division and integration of different clans was common. Jurchen households (boo) lived as families (booigon) consisting of five to seven blood-related family members and a number of slaves. Households formed squads (tatan) to engage in tasks related to hunting and food gathering and formed companies (niru) for larger activities, such as war.

=== Haixi, Jianzhou, and Yeren ===
The Haixi Jurchens were "semi-agricultural, the Jianzhou Jurchens and Maolian (毛怜) Jurchens were sedentary, while hunting and fishing was the way of life of the "Wild Jurchens". Hunting, horseback archery, horsemanship, livestock raising, and sedentary agriculture were all practiced by Jianzhou Jurchens. The Jurchen way of life (economy) was described as agricultural. They farmed crops and raised animals. Jurchens practiced slash-and-burn agriculture in the areas north of Shenyang.

"建州毛憐則渤海大氏遺孽，樂住種，善緝紡，飲食服用，皆如華人，自長白山迤南，可拊而治也。
The (people of) Jianzhou and Mao Lian are the descendants of the Ta family of Balhae. They love to be sedentary and sow, and they are skilled in spinning and weaving. As for food, clothing and utensils, they are the same as (those used by) the Chinese. (Those living) south of Changbai Mountain are apt to be soothed and governed."

— 据魏焕《皇明九边考》卷二《辽东镇边夷考》 Translation from Sino-J̌ürčed relations during the Yung-Lo period, 1403–1424 by Henry Serruys.

=== Queue ===
In 1126, the Jurchens initially ordered male Han Chinese within their conquered territories to adopt the Jurchen hairstyle by shaving the front of their heads and adopting Jurchen dress, but the order was later lifted. Ethnic Han rebels sometimes wore their hair in the Jurchen queue to impersonate Jurchens, and thus strike fear within their population. During the Qing dynasty, the Manchus, who descended from the Jurchens, similarly made Han Chinese men shave the front of their head and wear the rest of their hair in a queue, or soncoho (ᠰᠣᠨᠴᠣᡥᠣ) (辮子; biànzi), the traditional Manchu hairstyle.

=== Dogs ===
Although their Mohe ancestors did not revere dogs, the Jurchens began to revere dogs around the time of the Ming dynasty and passed this tradition on to the Manchus. It was prohibited in Jurchen culture to use dog skin, and forbidden for Jurchens to harm, kill, or eat dogs. The Jurchens believed that the "utmost evil" was the usage of dog skin by Koreans.

=== Sex and marriage ===
Pre-marital sex was probably accepted in lower class Jurchen society since the practice of guest prostitution - providing visitors with sex - did not impede their ability to marry later. The Jurchens also allowed marriage with in-laws, a practice considered taboo in Chinese society. Abduction marriages were common.

=== Burial ===
Until recently, it was uncertain what kind of burial rites existed among the Jurchens. In July 2012, Russian archaeologists discovered a Jurchen burial ground in Partizansky District of Primorye in Russia. Fifteen graves dating to the 12th or 13th century were found, consisting of the grave of a chieftain placed in the centre, with the graves of 14 servants nearby. All the graves contained pots with ashes, prompting the scientists to conclude that the Jurchens cremated the corpses of their dead. The grave of the chieftain also contained a quiver with arrows and a bent sword. The archaeologists propose that the sword was purposely bent, to signify that the owner would no longer need it in earthly life. The researchers planned to return to Primorye to establish whether this was a singular burial or a part of the larger burial ground.

=== Agriculture ===
Only the Mongols and the northern "wild" Jurchen were semi-nomadic, unlike the mainstream Jianzhou Jurchens descended from the Jin dynasty, who were farmers that foraged, hunted, herded and harvested crops in the Liao and Yalu river basins. They gathered ginseng root, pine nuts, hunted for came pels in the uplands and forests, raised horses in their stables, and farmed millet and wheat in their fallow fields. They engaged in dances, wrestling and drinking strong liquor as noted during midwinter by the Korean Sin Chung-il when it was very cold. These Jurchens who lived in the northeast's harsh cold climate sometimes half sunk their houses in the ground which they constructed of brick or timber and surrounded their fortified villages with stone foundations on which they built wattle and mud walls to defend against attack. Village clusters were ruled by beile, hereditary leaders. They fought each other and dispensed weapons, wives, slaves and lands to their followers in them. This was how the Jurchens who founded the Qing lived and how their ancestors lived before the Jin. Alongside Mongols and Jurchen clans there were migrants from Liaodong provinces of Ming China and Korea living among these Jurchens in a cosmopolitan manner. Nurhaci, who was hosting Sin Chung-il, was uniting all of them into his own army, having them adopt the Jurchen hairstyle of a long queue and a shaved forecrown and wearing leather tunics. His armies had black, blue, red, white and yellow flags. These became the Eight Banners, initially capped to 4 then growing to 8 with three different types of ethnic banners as Han, Mongol and Jurchen were recruited into Nurhaci's forces. Jurchens like Nurhaci spoke both their native Tungusic language and Chinese, adopting the Mongolian script for their own language, unlike the Jin Jurchen's use of the Khitan large script. They adopted Confucian values and practiced shamanist traditions. Most Jurchens raised pigs and stock animals and were farmers.

The Qing stationed the "New Manchu" Warka foragers in Ningguta and attempted to turn them into normal agricultural farmers but then the Warka just reverted to hunter gathering and requested money to buy cattle for beef broth. The Qing wanted the Warka to become soldier-farmers and imposed this on them, but the Warka simply left their garrison at Ningguta and went back to the Sungari to their homes to herd, fish and hunt. The Qing accused them of desertion.

== Religion ==
Jurchens practiced shamanic rituals and believed in a supreme sky goddess (abka hehe, literally sky woman). The Jurchens of the Jin dynasty practiced Buddhism, which became the prevalent religion of the Jurchens, and Taoism. The Jurchen word for "sorceress" was shanman. Under Confucian influence during the Qing dynasty, the gender of the female sky deity was switched to a male sky father, Abka Enduri (abka-i enduri, abka-i han).

== Language ==
The early Jurchen script was invented in 1120 by Wanyan Xiyin, acting on the orders of Wanyan Aguda. It was based on the Khitan script that was inspired in turn by Chinese characters. The written Jurchen language died out soon after the fall of the Jin dynasty. The Translators' Bureau of the Ming tributary bureaucracy received a communication from the Jurchens in 1444 stating that nobody among them understood the Jurchen script, so all letters sent to them should be written in Mongolian.

Until the end of the 16th century, when Manchu became the new literary language, the Jurchens used a combination of Mongolian and Chinese. The pioneering work on studies of the Jurchen script was done by Wilhelm Grube at the end of the 19th century.

== Genetics ==
Haplogroup C3b2b1*-M401(xF5483) has been identified as a possible marker of the Aisin Gioro and is found in ten different ethnic minorities in northern China, but completely absent from Han Chinese.

Genetic testing also showed that the haplogroup C3b1a3a2-F8951 of the Aisin Gioro family came to southeastern Manchuria after migrating from their place of origin in the Amur river's middle reaches, originating from ancestors related to Daurs in the Transbaikal area. The Tungusic speaking peoples mostly have C3c-M48 as their subclade of C3 which drastically differs from the C3b1a3a2-F8951 haplogroup of the Aisin Gioro which originates from Mongolic speaking populations like the Daur. Jurchen (Manchus) are a Tungusic people. The Mongol Genghis Khan's haplogroup C3b1a3a1-F3796 (C3*-Star Cluster) is a fraternal "brother" branch of C3b1a3a2-F8951 haplogroup of the Aisin Gioro. A genetic test was conducted on 7 men who claimed Aisin Gioro descent with 3 of them showing documented genealogical information of all their ancestors up to Nurhaci. 3 of them turned out to share the C3b2b1*-M401(xF5483) haplogroup, out of them, 2 of them were the ones who provided their documented family trees. The other 4 tested were unrelated. The Daur Ao clan carries the unique haplogroup subclade C2b1a3a2-F8951, the same haplogroup as Aisin Gioro and both Ao and Aisin Gioro only diverged merely a couple of centuries ago from a shared common ancestor. Other members of the Ao clan carry haplogroups like N1c-M178, C2a1b-F845, C2b1a3a1-F3796 and C2b1a2-M48. People from northeast China, the Daur Ao clan and Aisin Gioro clan are the main carriers of haplogroup C2b1a3a2-F8951. The Mongolic C2*-Star Cluster (C2b1a3a1-F3796) haplogroup is a fraternal branch to Aisin Gioro's C2b1a3a2-F8951 haplogroup.

== In fiction ==
In the alternative history timeline of Harry Turtledove's novel Agent of Byzantium, the Jurchens migrate westwards, reach Europe and become a serious threat to the Byzantine Empire.

They are a playable civilization in the video games Age of Empires II and Age of Empires IV.

== See also ==
- Ethnic groups in Chinese history
- Korean–Jurchen border conflicts
- List of Jurchen chieftains
- Nanai people
- Jaegaseung
- Toi invasion
- Researches on Manchu Origins
