= Jianzhou Jurchens =

Former ethnic group

Jianzhou Jurchens 建州女真
- Jurchens
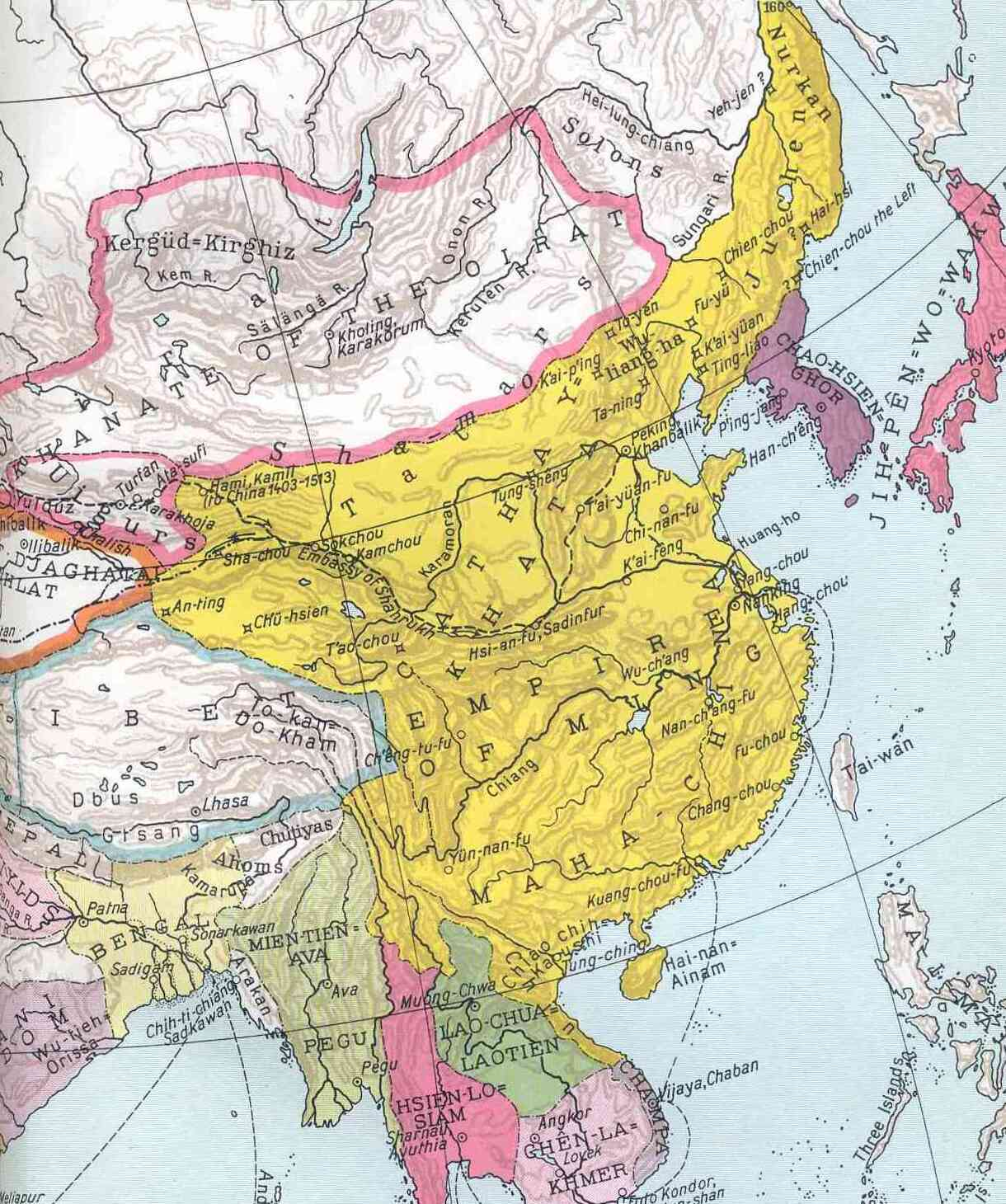
- Map of Ming Empire 1415, Jianzhou is labelled as Chien-chou near Korean Peninsula in the upper right
- Location: Manchuria
- Descended from: Odori Jurchens
- Language: Manchu language

The Jianzhou Jurchens (Chinese: 建州女真) were one of the three major groups of Jurchens as identified by the Ming dynasty. Although the geographic location of the Jianzhou Jurchens changed throughout history, during the 14th century they were located south of the Wild Jurchens and the Haixi Jurchens, and inhabited modern-day Liaoning and Jilin provinces in China. The Jianzhou Jurchens were known to possess an abundant supply of natural resources. They also possessed industrial secrets, particularly in processing ginseng and the dyeing of cloth. They were powerful due to their proximity to Ming trading towns such as Fushun, Kaiyuan, and Tieling in Liaodong, and to Manpojin camp near Korea.

== Origins ==
According to Pamela Crossley, a historian specializing in Manchu history, the origin of the name Jianzhou is contested. Xu Zhongsha thought it was derived from the region of Parhae, from the Songari and Hun Rivers. Japanese scholars disagree and state that the name was created from the migrating Jurchens, near the present border with Korea.

After the fall of the Yuan dynasty in 1368, pockets of Yuan loyalists retreated to the northeast. In 1375, a former Yuan official Naghachu residing in Liaoyang Province invaded Liaodong with the hope of restoring the Yuan dynasty. After he was defeated in 1387, the Ming began reorganizing the Jurchens in Liaodong to protect the Ming border region from further incursions. Various Jurchen groups had migrated south and three tribes settled themselves around the Tumen River near the modern border of China, Russia, and North Korea.

The Jianzhou Jurchen originate partially from the Huligai who were classified by the Liao dynasty as a separate ethnicity from the Jurchen people who founded the Jin dynasty and were classified as separate from Jurchens during the Yuan dynasty. Their home was in the lower reaches of the Songhua River and Mudanjiang. The Huligai later moved west and became a major component of the Jianzhou Jurchens led by Mentemu during the Ming dynasty, and the Jianzhou Jurchens later became Manchus. The Jurchens during the Ming dynasty lived in Jilin. According to the records of Ming Dynasty officials, the Jianzhou Jurchen was descended from Mohe people who established Balhae Kingdom.

The Taowen, Huligai, and Wodolian Jurchen tribes lived in the area of Heilongjiang in Yilan during the Yuan dynasty when it was part of Liaoyang Province and governed as a circuit. These tribes became the Jianzhou Jurchens in the Ming dynasty. In the Jin dynasty, the Jin Jurchens did not regard themselves as the same tribes as the Hurka people who became the Huligai. Uriangqa was used as a name in the 1300s by Jurchen migrants in Korea from Ilantumen because the Uriangqa influenced the people at Ilantumen. Bokujiang, Tuowulian, Woduolian, Huligai, and Taowan separately made up 30,000 households and were the divisions used by the Yuan dynasty to govern the people along the Wusuli River and Songhua area. To control the local population, the Yuan Empire appointed its supporters from among the Koreans, Khitans, and Mongols as leaders of the Jurchens. In the Jin dynasty the Shangjing route (上京路) governed the Huligai. A Huligai route was created as well by the Jin.

In 1388, the Hongwu Emperor established contact with three tribes of Ilan Tumen in modern Yilan County near the confluence of the Mudanjiang River and the Songhua River. The Odori, Huligai (Hūrha or Hurka) and Tuowen Jurchens were enlisted as allies against the Mongols. Jurchens began accepting Ming titles. Ahacu, chief of the Huligai, became commander of the Jianzhou Guard in 1403, named after a Yuan Dynasty political unit in the area. Möngke Temür (孟特穆) of the Odoli became the leader of the Jianzhou Left Guard and accepted the Chinese surname of Tong not long afterward. The two Jianzhou guards engaged in trade with the Ming at the designated market of Kaiyuan and Fushun. They undertook several short-term moves west, battling the Wild Jurchens of the north and the Koreans to their south. Jurchen raids into Korean territory brought about joint Korean-Ming counterattacks in 1467 and 1478 which severely weakened the Jianzhou Jurchens.

Jianzhou Jurchens adopted agriculture during the Ming dynasty when they acquired knowledge of fertilization, draft animals, and iron plows as they moved south closer to Asian agricultural civilizations. Iron-smelting and mining knowledge was acquired by the Jurchens from 1599 after they bought iron plowshares from the Chinese and learned how to turn iron into weapons from Koreans.

== Confederation building ==
By the mid-16th century, the Ming guard structure had mostly disappeared and the Jurchens were split between two confederations: the Haixi Jurchens and the Jianzhou Jurchens. The Jianzhou confederates continued to live north of the Yalu River in five tribes: the Suksuhu River tribe, Hunehe, Wanggiya, Donggo, and Jecen. Under the leadership of Wang Gao, the confederation raided the Ming frontier and even killed the Ming commander at Fushun in 1473. A major counterattack by the Chinese ended in the death of Wang Gao and the dissolution of the confederation.

In 1582, the Jianzhou confederation was met by the Ming military who launched a campaign which intended to stabilize the disintegrating confederation. The chieftain Nikan Wailan allied with the Ming general Li Chengliang against Wang Gao's son Atai. Giocangga, chief of the Beiles of the Sixes, was originally under Li's command since his grandson, the young Nurhaci was under his hostage. But Giocangga later chose to oppose Nikan Wailan and took his fourth son Taksi to support Atai at his stronghold Fort Gure. The battle at Gure, claimed Atai, Giocangga, and Taksi's lives.

A number of leaders within the Suksuhu tribe stood ready to take Nurhaci's place. However, Nurhaci eventually rose to power.

== Nurhaci and leadership of Jianzhou Jurchens ==
Taking control of his grandfather's Suksuhu River tribe, Nurhaci confronted the Ming and released the Seven Grievances. Nurhaci sought vengeance for the untimely deaths of his immediate family members and a vendetta against the Ming forces who took his father and grandfather's life was launched. Although the Ming were reluctant, Nikan Wailan was eventually held responsible for the deaths of Giocangga and Taksi, and was killed in 1586. The Ming claimed that their deaths were accidental and not part of the campaign. Afterwards, Li Chengliang even acted as a surrogate father. Nurhaci may have had actually lived within Li Chengliang's household in Fushun in his youth and perhaps gained his literacy in Chinese as a result of this experience. Nurhaci would later be responsible for unifying the Jurchens confederacies.

The leadership of the Jianzhou confederacies found its lineage from the Odori Jurchens whose leader Mongke Temur was renown by both the Ming and by the Yi. Giocangga, Nurhaci grandfather, claimed to be a fourth-generation descendant of Mongke Temur. The elite members of the Jurchen lineage possessed the Chinese characters for Jiagu in their names. In 1588 Nurhaci brought the Wanggiya tribe and Donggo tribe together. The unification of the Jianzhou Jurchens became a stepping stone for Nurhaci to expand his power throughout southern and central Manchuria, and to create a truly unified Manchu state. The very name Manchu (Jurchen: manju) was perhaps an old term for the Jianzhou Jurchens.

== Language ==
Unlike the Jurchen people, who spoke the Jin Jurchen language that was adopted from phonetic Kitan language established in the Jin dynasty, the Jianzhou Jurchens commonly used three different language: Jurchen, Mongolian and Chinese. According to the Qing imperial history, the Jianzhou leader Nurgaci sought to devise a suitable system that integrated the phonetic Mongolian and Jurchen language. This resulted in the creation of the Manchu language, which would later be deemed one of the greatest inventions that sparked the unification of Manchuria. However, for some time the script was not well received and the Jianzhou continued to use Mongolian as their lingua franca.

== Relationship with the Joseon dynasty ==
The Korean Joseon dynasty, incepted in the 1300s, had considered some Jurchen headmen as useful allies. Jurchens were positioned as far south as Hamhung in north central Korea since the 12th century. However, the Yi order in Korea included intense military campaigns to drive Jurchens northward toward the Yalu River and ultimately beyond it, into present-day Manchuria.

One of the most vivid narratives and depictions of the Jianzhou comes from a passage supplied by Sin Chun-li. Sin Chun-li's mission to the Jianzhou Jurchens was aimed to resolve the incident of 1594, in which the Jianzhou Jurchens captured at least seventeen Koreans and were being held for ransom. To resolve the issue, Sin was dispatched by the Korean court to Nurgaci's capital at Fe Ala. He and a small party of Korean officials crossed the Yalu river at Mamp Ojin, and followed a tributaries northwest to the Suksu Valley where Nurhaci was based.

Sin kept a detailed written record of his journey as he moved through Jianzhou Jurchen confederation. Despite it being winter, his insights tell us that the Jianzhou land was abundant with rivers, forests, and saw industrialization. Sin stratified his findings and stated that the Jianzhou Jurchen divided their society into villages of about twenty households or less, which were clustered along forested riverbanks. They lived off of the river and its surrounding terrain.

== Relationship with the Ming dynasty ==
The Jianzhou Jurchens, and other Jurchen groups were often in contention with the Ming and Yi for rights to trade. They often contended at Nurgan and Liaodong, which were politically and culturally marked territories before the Conquest of Qing China. However, there was also simultaneously cohesion, which was reflected in the scheduled visits of Jurchen leaders to Peking to "make ritual obeisance" to the Ming emperor. These visits were to satisfy the Ming tributary system. Conversely, it helped the Ming establish a list of Jurchen elites and military occupancies, but also deescalated tensions between the two groups. Nurgaci conducted at least two of the tributaries – one with his father at a young age and another led by himself. There, as early as 1580, he echoed the Jianzhou Jurchen elite's frustrations with the Ming officials in Liaodong. He established his grievances that the Ming officials were corrupt and often interfered with trading. However, the Jurchen were not viewed as a threat at this time by the Ming.

The change of the name from Jurchen to Manchu was made to hide the fact that the ancestors of the Manchus, the Jianzhou Jurchens, were ruled by the Chinese. The Qing dynasty carefully hide the 2 original editions of the books of "Qing Taizu Wu Huangdi Shilu" and the "Manzhou Shilu Tu" (Taizu Shilu Tu) in the Qing palace, forbidden from public view because they showed that the Manchu Aisin Gioro family had been ruled by the Ming dynasty. In the Ming period, the Koreans of Joseon referred to the Jurchen inhabited lands north of the Korean peninsula, above the rivers Yalu and Tumen to be part of Ming China, as the "superior country" (sangguk) which they called Ming China. The Qing deliberately excluded references and information that showed the Jurchens (Manchus) as subservient to the Ming dynasty, from the History of Ming to hide their former subservient relationship to the Ming. The Veritable Records of Ming were not used to source content on Jurchens during Ming rule in the History of Ming because of this.

== Trading along the border ==
When Nurhaci came to power, he implemented a strengthening of the Jianzhou Jurchen's by way of amassing agricultural laborers. This was achieved in part through the kidnapping of farmers living in border regions. However, unlike previous rulers, the Jianzhou Jurchens under Nurhaci provided shelter and gave other benefits and resources to these farmers which helped ease assimilation and established their allegiance to Nurhaci's regime.

Fushan was an "Tong ancestral town" and during the early 17th century, it was fortified by the Ming since it served as Liaodong's border that met with Nurgan – territories occupied by the Haixi, Jianzhou, and wild Jurchens. Fushan was the primacy licensed center for the trade, particularly renown for cured ginseng, horse trade, and dyed clothing. Fushan was also a primary location for Jianzhou embassy members who were conducting tributary missions to stop for entertainment and refreshments.

In 1618, Nurhaci's forces captured Fushun. This escalated tensions and in 1621, the Jianzhou Jurchens broke out in warfare with the Ming in Liaodong in which Nurhaci fought with Xiong Tingbi (1569–1625), the Ming military commander. By this time, he had declared a unified Jurchen regime that called itself "Jin," reminiscent of the former Jurchen empire. From this warfare, the Ming grew increasingly aware of Nurhaci's increasing and tremendous military power. Nurhaci, in 1622, convinced Mongols who were supporting the Ming's military efforts, to abandon their posts and it resulted in a disastrous defeat for the Ming at Guangning. Nurhaci's troops soon occupied Shenyang, the former Ming provincial capitol. This battle helped strengthen the Jianzhou and established more relationships with surrounding groups.

== See also ==
- List of Manchu clans
- Gioccanga
- Nurhaci
- Jurchen people
- Jurchen unification
- Sinicization of the Manchus
