= Haixi Jurchens =

Former ethnic group

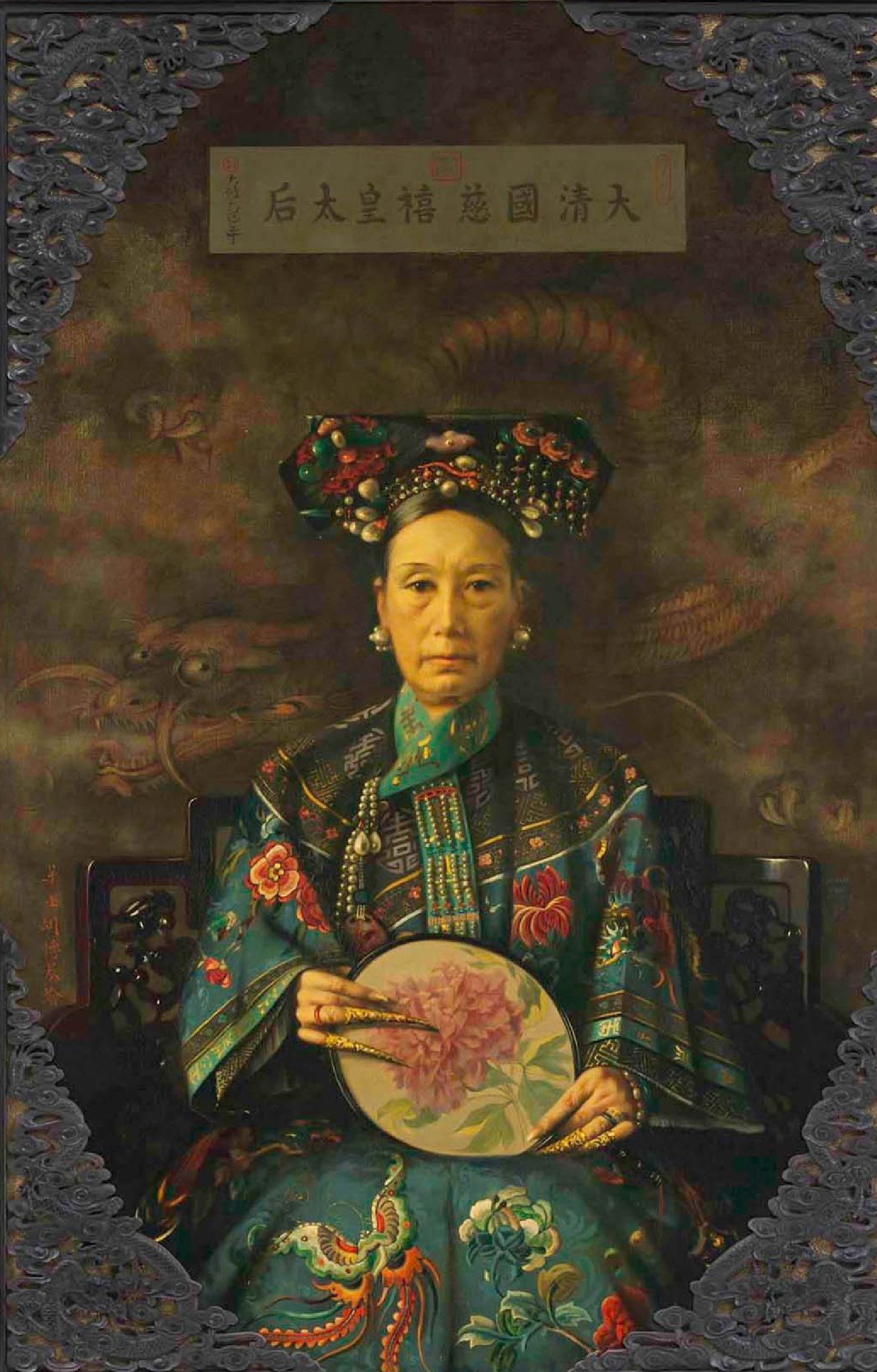
Empress Dowager Cixi became de facto ruler of China during the late Qing dynasty

The Haixi Jurchens (Chinese: 海西女真) were a grouping of the Jurchens as identified by the Chinese of the Ming dynasty. They inhabited an area that consists of parts of modern-day Jilin, Heilongjiang, Liaoning, and Inner Mongolia in China.

== Etymology ==
Haixi (Chinese: 海西; pinyin: Hǎixī; lit. 'West of the Sea') Jurchens is a name used by Han Chinese dynasties to denote this specific group of Tungusic people. In the records of other Jurchens, they are called "Hūlun gurun" which means "the country or land of the Hulun" (Chinese: 扈倫; pinyin: hùlún). The four powerful clans that dominated this tribe are called "Four Huluns" which consists of Ula, Hoifa, Hada, and Yehe.

The Haixi Jurchens was one of the three nomadic Jurchen tribes that was living on the northern border of Ming dynasty China. The other two Jurchens are Jianzhou Jurchens and Wild Jurchens respectively. Although the contemporary use of the word "Manchu" include the Haixi and Wild Jurchens, these two tribes are not originally called Manchus since the word "Manchu" or "Manju" was the indigenous name of the Jianzhou Jurchens only.

== History ==
The Haixi Jurchens appeared on the northern border of Ming China in the 1520s. Wangji Wailan, chieftain of the Hada clan obtained a peerage title from the Ming dynasty and became a vassal under the Chinese polity. Wanji Wailan's nephew Wan expanded the territories under his control and proclaimed himself a Khan. He established his seat in Hetu Ala and was also referred as the "Ningguta Beile”. The Haixi Jurchens sided with the Ming dynasty throughout the rule of Wan. When Wanggao, chieftain of the Jianzhou Jurchens started a rebellion against Ming China, the Haixi Jurchens actively participated in the repression of Wanggao's rebellion. After Wanggao was captured and executed, China rewarded the Haixi Jurchens greatly.

At the early stages of the rise of Qing empire, the Haixi Jurchens played an important and antagonistic role. The Jianzhou Jurchens which later become the ruler of Qing China had bitter relationships with the Haixi Jurchens. Eventually, the Hada clan were defeated by the Jianzhou Jurchens in the year of 1601 marking the end of its independence. Another notable clan Yehe resisted the Jianzhou Jurchens longer with failed attempts of seeking alliance with Ming dynasty (Since both Haixi and Ming are decisively defeated by Jianzhou and were not able to even up the odds). In 1619, Jianzhou Chieftain Nurhaci besieged the seat of Haixi Chieftain Gintaisi. Gintaisi died during the siege while leaving a famous curse "Even if there is only one daughter left in my clan, I will overthrow the Manchus!". The curse was arguably fulfilled by his direct descendant, Empress Dowager Cixi, who usurped power from the house of Aisin-gioro and became the de facto ruler of China. The curse was also fulfilled by Empress Dowager Longyu, a descendant of Gintaisi, and the one who eventually signed Puyi's abdication from the throne, thus ending the Qing dynasty.

== Notable people ==
- Cuigiya Lianyuan
- Empress Dowager Cixi
- Nalan Mingzhu
- Nalan Xingde

== See also ==
- Jurchen unification
- List of Manchu clans
- Sinicization of the Manchus
