= Yehe (disambiguation) =

Yehe may refer to:

- Yehe (葉赫), one of the 16th-century Jurchen/proto-Manchu tribal federations of Hulun (alliance)
- Yehe, Hebei, a town in Luancheng County, Hebei, China
- Yehe, Chongqing (野鹤), a town in Zhong County, Chongqing, China
- Yehe Manchu Ethnic Town (叶赫满族镇), a town in Siping, Jilin, China
