= Empress Yehe Nara =

Empress Yehe Nara may refer to:

- Empress Xiaocigao (1575–1603), consort of Nurhaci of the Later Jin dynasty
- Empress Dowager Cixi (1835–1908), consort of the Xianfeng Emperor
- Empress Dowager Longyu (1868–1913), consort of the Guangxu Emperor

== See also ==
- Empress Nara
- Empress Ula Nara (disambiguation)
- Yehe Nara clan
