= List of The Life and Times of a Sentinel characters =

The Life and Times of a Sentinel is a Hong Kong television drama produced by Television Broadcasts Limited (TVB). Some of the characters' names listed below are in Cantonese romanisation.

== Qing Dynasty ==
Cast	Role	Description	Age
Ching Hor-wai	Empress Dowager Xiaozhuang, during Kangxi reign known as The Grand Empress Dowager 孝莊太后 (孝莊太皇太后)	The Grand Empress Dowager; Aisin-Gioro Fulin's mother Aisin-Gioro Fuchuan, Aisin-Gioro Xuanye, Aisin-Gioro Changning, Aisin-Gioro Duanmin's grandmother Mastermind for genocide of Kei Family, to protect her personal interest Strong suspicious of Aisin-Gioro Fuchuan; Lost the amnesties from Kangxi Emperor for her outstanding wrongdoings and unforgivable crimes Died in Episode 27 at the age of 75. (Villain)	
Sunny Chan	Aisin-Gioro Fulin (Shunzhi Emperor) 愛新覺羅·福臨 (順治帝)	Shunzhi Emperor; Empress Dowager Xiaozhuang's son Died of grief due to the death of Empress Donggo	22
Power Chan	Aisin-Gioro Xuanye (Kangxi Emperor) 愛新覺羅·玄燁 (康熙帝)	Kangxi Emperor; Shunzhi Emperor's third son Empress Dowager Xiaozhuang's grandson Aisin-Gioro Fuchuan, Aisin-Gioro Changning, Aisin-Gioro Duanmin's brother	
Kenneth Ma	Aisin-Gioro Fuchuan (Prince Yu) 愛新覺羅·福全	Prince Yu; Shunzhi Emperor's second son Empress Dowager Xiaozhuang's grandson Aisin-Gioro Xuanye, Aisin-Gioro Changning, Aisin-Gioro Duanmin's brother Tongjia Manyun's ex-boyfriend Mild hostility against Empress Dowager Xiaozhuang; Nip Dor-po's friend, later enemy Expelled to Mongolia by Kangxi Emperor in Episode 27 (Villain)	
Natalie Tong	Xiluke Guilun 西魯克·桂倫	Aisin-Gioro Fuchuan's wife Hot-bo-ngak Ha-sin and Tongjia Manyun's cousin Expelled to Mongolia by Kangxi Emperor in Episode 27 (Villain)	25
Steven Ma	Nip Dor-po (Prince Rong) 聶多寶 (榮親王)	Prince Rong; Shunzhi Emperor's fourth son Empress Dowager Xiaozhuang's grandson	26
Tsui Wing	Aisin-Gioro Changning (Prince Gong) 愛新覺羅·常寧	Prince Gong; Empress Dowager Xiaozhuang's grandson Shunzhi Emperor and Consort Chenxiu's son Guertu Jiancheng's husband Aisin-Gioro Fuchuan, Aisin-Gioro Xuanye, Aisin-Gioro Duanmin's brother	30
Christine Kuo	Guertu Jiancheng 古爾圖·建澄	Aisin-Gioro Changning's wife Poisoned by Hot-bo-ngak Ha-sin under the order of Aisin-Gioro Fuchuan in Episode 23	22
Selena Li	Aisin-Gioro Duanmin (Cheuk Tsz-yi) 愛新覺羅·端敏 (卓紫凝)	Empress Dowager Xiaozhuang's granddaughter Shunzhi Emperor and Consort Chenxiu's daughter Cheuk Shu-tong's adopted daughter Aisin-Gioro Fuchuan, Aisin-Gioro Xuanye, Aisin-Gioro Changning's sister Nip Dor-po's love interest Killed by Hor Yee in Episode 25	25

== Imperial Harem ==
Cast	Role	Description	Age
Elaine Yiu	Tongjia Manyun (Imperial Noble Consort) 佟佳·曼筠 (皇貴妃)	Kangxi Emperor's consort Xiluke Guilun's cousin Aisin-Gioro Fuchuan's ex-girlfriend Ngan Ying-suet's enemy Harmed by Xiluke Guilun to cause abortion in Episode 21; Survived a suicide attempt though became paralyzed in Episode 24; Appointed Queen in Episode 25	29
Grace Wong	Ngan Ying-suet (Consort Wai) 顏映雪 (惠妃)	Ngan Yuk-ming's daughter Kangxi Emperor's consort Tongjia Manyun's enemy Banished to the cold palace by Kangxi Emperor in Episode 13; Framed by Aisin-Gioro Fuchuan and killed by Hot-bo-ngak Ha-sin in Episode 21 (Villain)	24
Rosanne Lui	Consort Chenxiu 陳秀妃	Shunzhi Emperor's consort Aisin-Gioro Changning and Aisin-Gioro Duanmin's mother	
Océane Zhu	Empress Xiaoxianzhang 孝獻章皇后	Shunzhi Emperor's favorite consort Deceased	21

== Nip Family ==
Cast	Role	Description	Age
Samuel Kwok	Nip Koon-yat 聶貫一	A restaurant owner Ko Choi-king's husband Nip Dor-po's adopted father Fung Sheung-hei's uncle Committed suicide by poisoning in Episode 19, but actually caused to death by Aisin-Gioro Fuchuan in later episodes	50
Helen Ma	Ko Choi-king 高彩瓊	Nip Koon-yat's wife Nip Dor-po's adopted mother Fung Sheung-hei's aunt Committed suicide by poisoning in Episode 19, but actually caused to death by Aisin-Gioro Fuchuan in later episode	
Steven Ma	Nip Dor-po (Kei Chun-kit) 聶多寶 (祈俊傑)	Imperial guard Nip Koon-yat and Ko Choi-king's adopted son Fung Sheung-hei's cousin	26
Katy Kung	Fung Sheung-hei 馮雙喜	Nip Koon-yat and Ko Choi-king's niece Nip Dor-po's cousin Yan Chak's love interest, later girlfriend	23

== Kei Family ==
Cast	Role	Description
Ben Wong	Kei To-ting 祈道廷	Imperial Guard Grade 1, later a monk Kei Man-cheong's father Kei Chun-kit's grandfather Tin Kong-ching's master Killed himself to protect family
Felix Lok	Kei Man-cheong (Sham Chin-yat) 祈萬昌 (岑千日)	Kei To-ting's son Kei Chun-kit's father Died in Episode 14 when he fell off a cliff while he was being chased by imperial guards Youngster portrayed by Lai Lok-yi
Steven Ma	Kei Chun-kit (Nip Dor-po) 祈俊傑 (聶多寶)	Kei To-ting's grandson Kei Man-cheong's son

== Imperial Guard ==
Cast	Role	Description	Age
Evergreen Mak	Cheuk-muk-hak Bo-chai 卓木克·布齊	Imperial Guard superintendent Sheung-chak-yi Tai-shek, Bo-li-ngai Hin-shing, Hot-bo-ngak Ha-sin's superior Served under the Emperor, but only truly loyal to the Grand Empress; Antagonistic and mild grudge to Nip Dor-po (Villain)	40
Deno Cheung	Sheung-chak-yi Tai-shek 尚澤爾·泰石	Imperial Guard Grade 1 Cheuk-muk-hak Bo-chai's subordinate Antagonistic to Nip Dor-po; Killed by Hot-bo-ngak Ha-sin in Episode 23 (Villain)	
Lam King-kong	Bo-li-ngai Hin-shing 布里雅·憲承	Imperial Guard Grade 1 Cheuk-muk-hak Bo-chai's subordinate Antagonistic to Nip Dor-po; Captured and executed by Imperial Guards in Episode 9 (Villain)	
Jack Wu	Hot-bo-ngak Ha-sin 渴布額·哈善	Imperial Guard Grade 1 Cheuk-muk-hak Bo-chai's subordinate Xiluke Guilun's cousin Aisin-Gioro Fuchuan's right man, but later turned against and fully loyaled to the Grand Enpress in Episode 25; Killed by Aisin-Gioro Fuchuan in the same episode (Villain)	
Steven Ma	Nip Dor-po (Kei Chun-kit) 聶多寶 (祈俊傑)	Blue Feather Imperial Guard, promoted to Imperial Guard Grade 3 followed by another promotion to Grade 1 then later on to Commander	
Fred Cheng	Bo-kei-lok Yan-chak 布奇諾·恩澤	Blue Feather Imperial Guard; Loved Fung Sheung-hei; Nip Dor-po's friend Had his left arm chopped off by Cheuk-muk-hak Bo-chai in Episode 24	
Stephen Wong Ka-lok	Nalan Xingde 納蘭·性德	Imperial Guard Grade 1 Nalan Mingzhu's son Aisin-Gioro Xuanye's personal bodyguard Stripped of his rank and banished from the palace by Aisin-Gioro Xuanye in Episode 23	29
Matthew Ko	Ngai Chun 倪俊	Real name Hung Kwan; Imperial Guard Trainee; Anti-Qing Dynasty activist Killed by Bo-li-ngai Hin-shing in Episode 6	

== Others ==
Cast	Role	Description	Age
Cheung Kwok-keung	Cheuk Shu-tong 卓樹棠	A pharmacy owner Anti-Qing Dynasty activist Cheuk Tsz-yi's adopted father Executed by Empress Dowager Xiaozhuang in Episode 21	
Lau Kong	Tin Kong-ching 田剛正	Monk Hin Yan; A monk Kei To-ting's apprentice Youngster portrayed by Au Siu-wai	
Law Lok-lam	Nalan Mingzhu 納蘭·明珠	Nalan Xingde's father Ngan Yuk-ming's enemy	50
Yu Tsz-ming	Ngan Yuk-ming 顏玉銘	Ngai Ying-suet's father Nalan Mingzhu's enemy Expelled to Tibet by Kangxi Emperor in Episode 10	
Lo Chun-shun	Chiu Lai-wo 趙禮和	Empress Dowager Xiaozhuang's eunuch	50
Lily Ho	Sham Chui-yuk 岑翠玉	Introduced in Episode 10; Aisin-Gioro Duanmin's servant girl Anti-Qing Dynasty activist Committed suicide in Episode 20	
Angel Chiang	Hor Yee 可兒	Aisin-Gioro Duanmin's servant girl Anti-Qing Dynasty activist	

== See also ==
- The Life and Times of a Sentinel
