= Xiao (surname) =

Xiao / Hsiao / Shaw
- Xiao surname in regular script
- Pronunciation: Xiāo (Pinyin); Siau, Sio (Pe̍h-ōe-jī)
- Language: Chinese, Vietnamese, Korean

Origin
- Language: Old Chinese
- Origin: Xiao County, Anhui
- Derivation: State of Xiao (萧国)

Other names
- Variant forms: Xiao, Hsiao (Mandarin); Siu, Shiu, Siew (Cantonese, Hakka); Siow, Sio, Siaw, Seow (Hokkien, Foochow, Hainan, Teochew); Shaw (Overseas); Tiêu (Vietnamese)

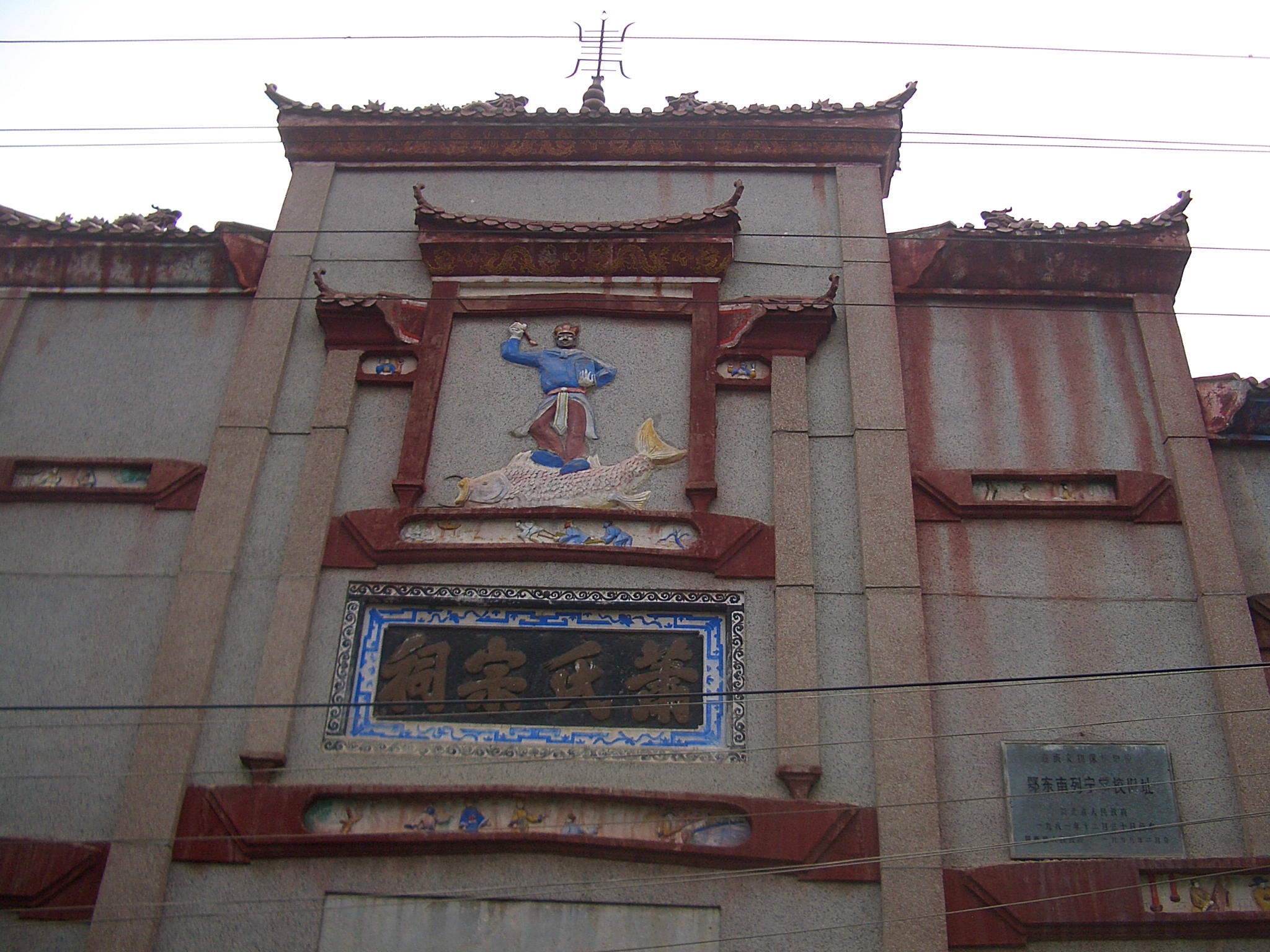
The ancestral hall of the Xiao clan (蕭氏宗祠) in Yangxin County, Hubei

Xiao (/ʃaʊ/; Chinese: 蕭) is a Chinese-language surname. In the Wade-Giles system of romanization, it is rendered as Hsiao, which is commonly used in Taiwan. It is also romanized as Siauw, Shiao, Siaw, Siew, Siow, Seow, Siu, Shiu or Sui, as well as Shaw among overseas Chinese communities. It is the 99th name on the Hundred Family Surnames poem.

After the demise of the Qing dynasty, some of the descendants of Manchu clan Šumuru sinicized their clan name to the Chinese surnames Shu (舒), Xu (徐) or Xiao (蕭).

A 1977 study found that it was the 20th most common Chinese surname in the world. It is said to be the 30th most common in China. In 2019 it was the 33rd most common surname in mainland China.

== History ==
=== Han Chinese surname ===
The Xiao surname originated from Xiao County in Anhui province, China. In the state of Song during the Spring and Autumn period of ancient China, the nobleman Daxin (蕭叔大心) was enfeoffed at Xiao, which became an attached state of Song. The people of Xiao later adopted the name of their state as their surname. Centuries later, Xiao He was the first prime minister of the Han dynasty. Later on, his descendant Xiao Biao (萧彪) moved to Lanling (兰陵), now Yicheng in Shandong province, due to political problems during the reign of Emperor Wu of Han. The Xiao people therefore also trace their origin to Lanling, and sometimes they are called Lanling Xiao (“兰陵萧”).

Another mass movement of Xiao people came during the Disaster of Yongjia at the end of the Western Jin dynasty, when Xiao Zheng (萧整) moved to Danyang, Jiangsu. It was also called South Lanling (南兰陵). The descendants of Danyang Xiao (丹阳萧氏) later founded two dynasties: Xiao Daocheng was the founding emperor of the Southern Qi dynasty, and Xiao Yan founded the Liang dynasty.

During the Tang dynasty, there were nine Xiao family members appointed as chancellors (or prime ministers), the continuous eight chancellors (八叶传芳, "八叶世家"). The first was Xiao Yu (萧瑀), followed by the other eight Xiao families:

his great grand nephew Xiao Song (萧嵩)
Xiao Song's eldest son Xiao Hua (萧华)
Xiao Hua's nephew Xiao Fu (萧復)
Xiao Hua's grandson Xiao Fu (萧俯, written with a different character for Fu)
Xiao Fu's grandson Xiao Zhen (萧真)
Xiao Hua's grandson Xiao Fang (萧仿)
Xiao Fang's son Xiao Gou (萧遘).

There were altogether nine chancellors from the Xiao family during the Tang dynasty.

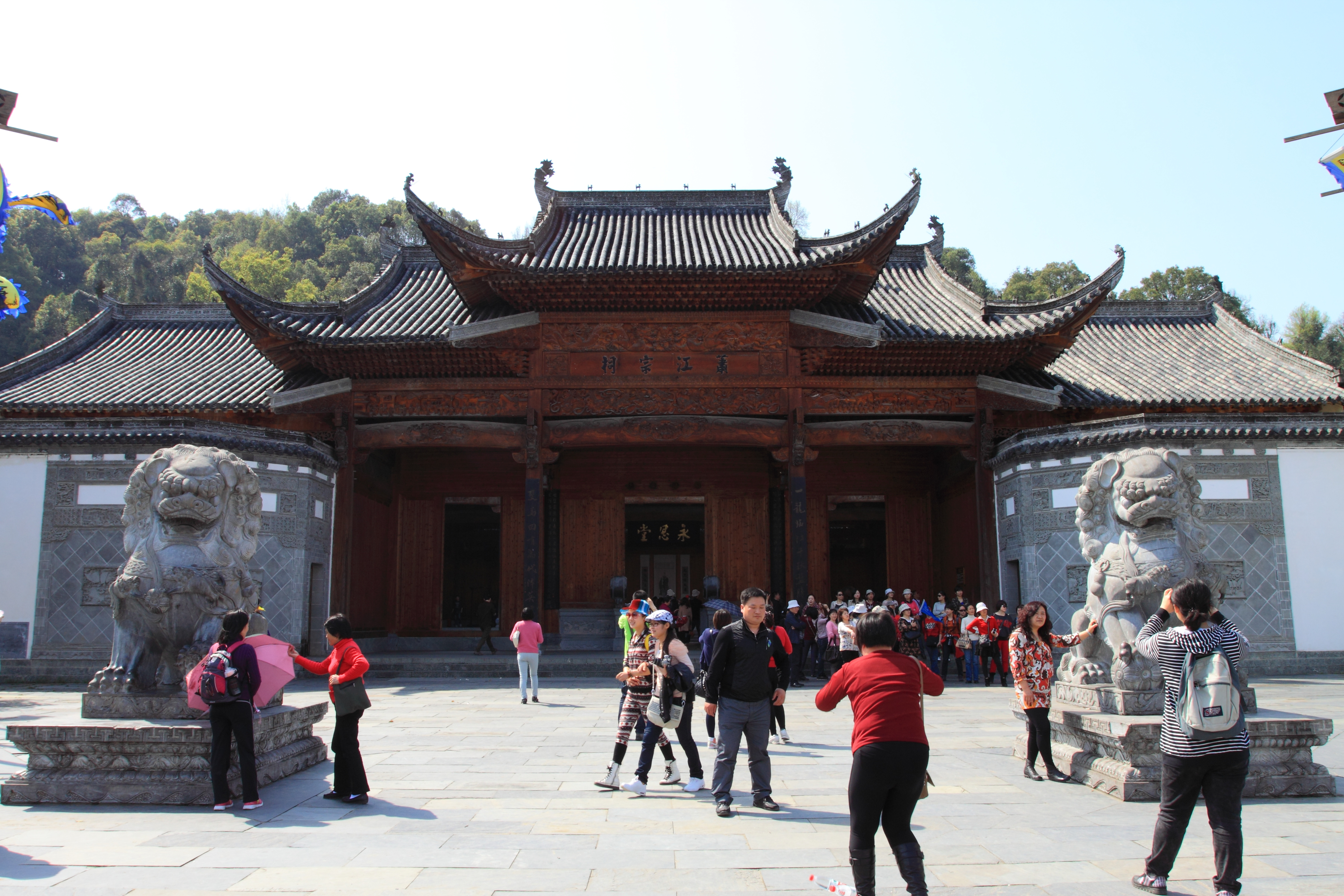
The Xiao–Jiang Ancestral Hall in Jiangwan, Wuyuan

The Jiang family (江氏) from Jiangwan (江湾), Wuyuan, Jiangxi was originally surnamed Xiao and they call themselves the Xiao–Jiang family (萧江氏). The Xiao-Jiang family was from Danyang (丹阳 (南兰陵) 东城里萧氏). When the Later Liang dynasty overthrew the Tang dynasty in 907, the Tang general Xiao Zhen (萧桢) led a revolt against the Later Liang dynasty but failed. Xiao Zhen was the second son of the Tang chancellor Xiao Gou. The Xiao family left Danyang and escaped to the south. They changed their surname to Jiang; Xiao Zhen (萧桢) became Jiang Zhen (江桢) and he was the progenitor of the Xiao–Jiang family. They later moved to Yunwan (云湾, which changed the name to Jiangwan 江湾). This means that the Jiang family from this area is actually also part of the Xiao family, they are known as the Xiao-Jiang family.

During the Southern Song dynasty, Xiao Guoliang (萧国梁) was the first member of the Xiao family in Zhangzhou, Fujian province. His grandson, Xiao Xun (萧洵) became the county magistrate of Chaoyang in Guangdong province. He became the founder of the Xiao family of Chaoyang. During this period, some members of the Xiao family moved across the sea to Taiwan.

=== Khitan, Uighur and Manchu surname ===
During the Liao dynasty, the emperor Abaoji conferred the surname "Xiao" on two Khitan clans, the Bali and the Yishi, reportedly out of admiration for Xiao He. Abaoji's son Yaogu further conferred the surname "Xiao" on the Uighur Shulü clan. Throughout the Liao dynasty, many empresses were surnamed "Xiao" (see list).

After the demise of the Manchu Qing dynasty, many Manchus adopted Han Chinese-style surnames. Some members of the Manchu Šumuru clan, which claims descent from the Uighur Shulü clan, adopted "Xiao" as their surname.

=== Later history ===
During the Yuan dynasty, members of the Xiao family moved from Jiangxi to Meizhou and Dabu in Guangdong province. They are mainly the Hakka Xiao family.

In the early Ming dynasty, the population in North and Central China was declining due to wars. In order to increase the population and start the economic recovery of these war-torn areas, the Ming government organized many large-scale forced mass migration to the area. People were moved from Shanxi province, which had been less affected by the wars, to the war-torn, less populated area of North and Central China. The people were ordered to move to a location near "the tree" (大槐树), and prepare themselves for the family migration. The Shanxi Xiao family were part of this group of "immigrants under the tree" (在大槐树下集中移民), which were moved to the modern provinces of Henan, Shandong, Hebei, Beijing, Tianjin, Shaanxi, Gansu, Ningxia, Anhui, Jiangsu, Hubei, Hunan, Guangxi, Liaoning, Jilin, Heilongjiang, Shanxi and other places. Today, the Xiao family still has memorial tablets dedicated to their ancestors among the "immigrants under the tree" at the fourth cabinet of the memorial hall at the "large tree roots memorial garden" (大槐树寻根祭祖园祭祖堂四号供橱).

During the Ming dynasty, many members of the Xiao family also moved to Yunnan province. They became the first members of the Yunnan Xiao family (云南萧氏).

During the Ming and Qing dynasties, there were also mass migrations of Xiao kinspeople from Jiangxi to Sichuan, especially at the beginning of these dynasties, when two major revolutions took place. Historians have called this process of mass migration "Jiangxi filled Huguang, Huguang filled Sichuan" (江西填湖广，湖广填四川). "Huguang" refers to the provinces of Hunan and Guangdong. According to historical materials, from the beginning of the reign of the Qianlong Emperor of the Qing dynasty, many members of the Xiao family moved to Sichuan.

During the Chinese Civil War between the Communists and the Nationalists, Xiao people, especially those from Fujian, moved to Taiwan with the Nationalists. In Taiwan, they lived primarily in the cities and counties of Changhua, Chiayi, Taipei, Kaohsiung and Taoyuan. Today, Xiao is the 30th-most common surname in Taiwan.

The World Congress of Xiao people was held in Chaoyang, Guangdong province, China in 2010.

=== Overseas ===
At the end of the Qing dynasty, Chinese started to move to other countries to work there. The Xiao also moved to other countries such as Vietnam, Thailand, Singapore, Malaysia and Indonesia. Others migrated from Fujian to Taiwan.

In Malaysia and Singapore, direct transliterations from the various Chinese dialects were used to write Chinese surnames. The Hokkien or Teochew Chinese romanized "Xiao" as "Seow". Teochew "Seow" are mainly Xiao from Chaoyang in Guangdong province. The Hakka Xiao, especially Huizhou Hakka of Titi (知知港) (in Negeri Sembilan state of Malaysia), a village with a high concentration of Hakka people surnamed Xiao, romanized "Xiao" as "Siow" or "Seow". These days, some members of younger generations use Hanyu Pinyin and write their surname as "Xiao".

In the United States, the surname is also romanized as Shaw. The connection between "Shaw" and "萧" is influenced by phonetic resemblance, and is exemplified in the transliteration of notable figures such as Irish playwright George Bernard Shaw, rendered in Chinese as 萧伯纳, and English actor Robert Shaw, often written 勞勃·蕭. This reflects established conventions for translation between foreign and Chinese names, as outlined in resources like the English Name Translation Manual (英语姓名译名手册), ensuring that translated names resonate with native speakers and maintain phonetic consistency with the original pronunciation.

== Simplified Chinese forms ==
The traditional surname 蕭 is currently represented by three different characters derived from traditional Chinese (蕭), simplified Chinese (萧), and the rescinded second-round simplification (肖). Hong Kong, Malaysia and Taiwan maintain traditional Chinese characters and therefore write 蕭. In mainland China and Singapore, where simplified Chinese is used, most linguistics agree the surname should be written as 萧. However, many people in mainland China still have 肖 as their surname in their legal documents for historical reasons (see below). In mainland China, people may regard them as two separate surnames. However, in circumstances where traditional Chinese is used, e.g. in cross-strait relations, this may lead to confusion.

People have long been writing the surname 肖 for simplicity, but the form was considered informal and not used in formal texts. However, the second-round Chinese simplification established 肖 as the standard form. When the second-round simplification was rescinded in 1984, some people restored their surname in legal documents to the traditional writing form, but some others did not.

Most other surnames do not share these problems. For example, Liao (廖) was simplified to 𭙏 (character composition: ⿸广了) in the second-round simplification. All Liao people reverted to using 廖 after the rescission, because the modification is no longer considered a valid character and cannot be typed into the computer. However, 肖, which has other meanings, is still valid so some people have continued to use this form including in legal documents.

== Notable people surnamed Xiao ==
=== Historical figures ===
- Emperor Wu of Liang (464–549), founder of the Liang dynasty
- Empress Xiao (disambiguation), various Liao dynasty empresses
- Xiao He (257 BC–193 BC), Chinese calligrapher and politician
- Xiao Yu (575–648), official under the Sui and Tang dynasties
- Pure Consort Xiao (Xiao Shufei) (d. c. November 655), Consort of Emperor Gaozong of Tang

=== Modern times ===
- Xiao Qian (1910–1999), Chinese essayist, journalist and translator
- Hsiao Bi-khim (born 1971), Taiwanese politician and diplomat
- Hsiao Chia-chi (born 1961), Taiwanese politician
- Elva Hsiao (born 1979), Taiwanese singer
- Jam Hsiao (born 1987), Taiwanese singer
- Hsiao Sa (born 1953), Taiwanese educator and writer
- William Hsiao (born 1936), American economist
- Seow Poh Leng (1883–1942), Singaporean banker and philanthropist
- Josephine Siao (born 1946), Hong Kong actress, writer and psychologist
- Felix Siauw (born 1984), Chinese-Indonesian Islamic cleric, author and da'i
- Siauw Giok Tjhan (1914–1981), Chinese Indonesian activist and politician
- Gaétan Siew (born 1954), Mauritian architect
- Vincent Siew (born 1939), Taiwanese politician
- Siow Lee Chin (born 1966), Singaporean violinist
- Anna Sui (born 1964), American fashion designer
- Arlen Siu (1955–1975), Nicaraguan singer-songwriter, essayist and Sandinista revolutionary
- Edwin Siu (born 1977), Hong Kong actor and singer
- Yum-Tong Siu (born 1943), Chinese mathematician
- Andrew Seow (born c. 1969), Singaporean actor and model
- Siow Hui Mei (born 1982), Malaysian news journalist and television personality
- Choon-Leong Seow, Singaporean biblical scholar and historian
- Francis Seow (1928–2016), Singaporean lawyer and politician
- Seow Sin Nee (born 1995), Malaysian host, actress and radio DJ
- David Xiao (born 1960), Canadian businessman and politician
- Di Xiao, Chinese pianist
- Jeffrey Siow (born 1978), Singaporean politician and former civil servant
- Xiao Dejun (born 1999) Chinese singer, Member of WayV)
- Xiao Fuxing (born 1947), Chinese novelist
- Xiao Guodong (born 1989), Chinese professional snooker player
- Xiao Hong (1911–1942), Chinese writer
- Xiao Jie (born 1957), Chinese politician
- Xiao Ke (1907–2008), Chinese general
- Xiao Qiang (born 1961), Chinese scientist and academic
- Xiao Yang (judge) (1938–2019), Chinese judge and politician
- Xiao Zhan (born 1991), Chinese actor and singer
- Carl K. Y. Shaw (蕭高彥), Taiwanese political scientist, Distinguished Research Fellow at Academia Sinica, and Professor at National Taiwan University
- Chen-Fu Shaw (蕭正夫), Taiwanese biologist and professor of biological sciences at National Sun Yat-sen University
- Cheng-Mei Shaw (蕭成美), Professor Emeritus of Neuropathology at the University of Washington
- Fu-Zen Shaw (蕭富仁), Taiwanese neuroscientist and Distinguished Professor of Psychology at National Cheng Kung University
- Jin-Siang Shaw (蕭俊祥), Taiwanese mechanical engineer and professor at National Taipei University of Technology
- Mei-Chi Shaw (蕭美琪), Taiwanese-American mathematician and Professor of Mathematics at the University of Notre Dame.
- Michael J. Shaw (蕭正平), information systems scholar and Professor Emeritus of Business Administration at the University of Illinois Urbana-Champaign
- Ning-Sing Shaw (蕭寧馨), Professor of Biochemical Science and Technology at National Taiwan University
- Ping Shaw (蕭蘋), Taiwanese communications scholar and professor at the Institute of Marketing Communication, National Sun Yat-sen University
- Ruey-Shiang Shaw (蕭瑞祥), Taiwanese information management scholar and Chief Sustainability Officer at Tamkang University
- Shih-Lung Shaw (蕭世倫), geography and geographic information science (GIS) scholar, Chancellor's Professor at the University of Tennessee, Knoxville
- Steven Sheng-Wen Shaw (蕭勝文), Taiwanese fetal medicine specialist, researcher, and Associate Professor at Chang Gung Memorial Hospital
