= Gintaisi =

Gintaisi (Manchu: ; died September 29, 1619), known as Jintaishi (Chinese: 金台石, 錦台什) or Jintaiji (Chinese: 金台吉) in Chinese, was a Jurchen beile (chieftain) of the Yehe tribal confederation.

He was the younger brother of Narimbulu, and became one of the two beile of the Yehe tribe after the death of his brother which took place sometime before 1613. In 1613, Bujantai the beile of the Ula tribe had fled to the Yehe after the defeat of his forces at the hands of Nurhaci. Gintaisi gave him protection and when attacked by Nurhaci, he appealed to the Ming Chinese for help. In 1615, he attempted to appease the Mongols on the west by marrying his cousin (who had eighteen years before been promised to Nurhaci) to the Khalka beile. The alliance with the Chinese in the end proved to be a futile arrangement, for in 1619 Nurhaci defeated a large Chinese army, together with its Yehe auxiliaries at the Battle of Sarhu and then proceeded to besiege Gintaisi in his own stronghold. Despite attempts at a settlement by Nurhaci's son, Hong Taiji the future emperor who was also Gintaisi's nephew, the fighting continued until both Gintaisi and his cousin Buyanggu (布揚古) had been captured. Gintaisi was either executed by hanging or he committed suicide, but not before he allegedly cursed Nurhaci that as long as one of his descendants lived, even a female one, he or she would remember the clan's vendetta and bring down the Aisin Gioro.

With his death, the independent existence of the Yehe tribe came to an end and the last of the Jurchen tribes under the Hūlun (alliance) were brought under the control of Nurhaci, but many of its members, including his descendants, became prominent in the service of Nurhaci and of the succeeding Manchu emperors. Even the Empress Dowager Cixi traced her descent back to the Yehe division of the Nara clan, and recognized Yangginu, the father of Gintaisi, as her great ancestor.

Gintaisi Yehe Born: ? Died: 1619
Regnal titles
Preceded by Narimbulu	Beile of the Yehe Nara; 1613-1619	Extinct
