= Empress Xiaocigao =

Empress Xiaocigao may refer to:

- Empress Xiaocigao (Ming Dynasty), empress of the Hongwu Emperor of the Ming Dynasty, also known as Empress Ma
- Empress Xiaocigao (Qing Dynasty), concubine of Nurhaci, founder of the Qing Dynasty, also known as Lady Yehenara Monggo
