= Yangginu and Cinggiyanu =

Jurchen chieftains (died 1583)

Yangginu (Manchu:ᠶᠠᠩᡤᡳᠨᡠ, died c. December 1583) and Cinggiyanu (ᠴᡳᠩᡤᡳᠶᠠᠨᡠ, died c. December 1583) were Jurchen chieftains of the Yehe-Nara clan. They were either the sons or grandsons of the Yehe chief Cukungge, who was executed by the Hada chief Wangji Wailan during an invasion. They were made wards and vassals of the Hada Khan Wan, who had conquered a wide swath of territory and formed the Hulun confederation. Inheriting the eastern half of the Hada territory, Yangginu secured a marriage with a Mongol noblewoman and eventually gained the clan's independence from Wan, who died soon afterwards. Along with their Mongol allies, the brothers invaded the Hada in 1583, but was ambushed and killed by a Hada ally, Chinese general Li Chengliang.

== Biography ==
Yangginu and his brother Cinggiyanu were beile (chieftains) of the Yehe Nara clan, either the sons or grandsons of the clan leader Cukungge. The Yehe were not directly related to the Nara clan, but were descendants of a Tumed Mongol leader named Singgen Dargan who destroyed a group of Jurchen of the Nara clan along the Yehe River and adopted their clan name.

Unlike the neighboring Hada tribe, the Yehe were raiders hostile to the Ming dynasty. With Ming support, the Hada chief Wangji Wailan invaded the Yehe and executed Cukungge. Orphaned, Yangginu and Cinggiyanu were made wards and vassals of Wangji Wailan's nephew, the Hada Khan Wan. Yangginu was married to one of Wan's daughters, while Wan took one of Yangginu's sisters as a concubine. Wan conquered a wide territory, incorporated the Yehe, Hoifa, and Ula tribes into his Hulun confederation. The Yehe were divided between the two brothers, with Yangginu controlling the eastern portion of their previous territory and Cinggiyanu the west. Yagginu participated in raids on Liaodong with the Jianzhou leader Wang Gao and traded with the Ming at the frontier market of Zhenbei. On one occasion, Yangginu dispatched a small force, including Chinese-speaking tribesmen, to meet at the market and distract the local guards while the main force proceeded into Ming territory to raid.

While under Hada authority, Yangginu and Cinggiyanu schemed to avenge Cukungge, and grew their power. By 1572, they had a combined total of 20,000 horsemen under their command. Wan's power began to decline; he grew senile and was weakened by the tyrannical actions of his son Hurhan. Gradually increasing his power, Yangginu was able to marry a Mongol noblewoman and secured the independence of both the Yehe and the Ula in 1582. Wan died soon afterwards, and the Hada collapsed into a secession dispute between Hurhan and his illegitimate brother Kangguru. The young Jianzhou chieftain Nurhaci sought a marriage connection with the Yehe. Although he was relatively weak in terms of military power, Yangginu was impressed by Nurhaci's abilities and betrothed his youngest daughter Xiaoce (also known as Monggo-gege, an epithet meaning "Mongol lady") to him.

In 1583, Yangginu and Cinggiyanu invaded the Hada alongside a large force of Mongol allies, and ransacked the territory of the chief Menggebulu. They then moved south to attack the Chinese trading centers. The forces of General Li Chengliang came to the aid of the Hada. Li was able to lure them both to the North Pass, where they were ambushed and killed by his forces around December 1583. Yangginu's son Narimbulu succeeded him as beile of the Yehe and continued his fight against the Ming, although was eventually subdued after a long campaign. Honoring his father's agreement, he escorted Xiaoce, aged 14, to Nurhaci in 1588. This was Nurhaci's first diplomatic marriage. She became his favored consort, was proclaimed the Empress Xiaocigao, and bore him a son named Hong Taiji, who would go on to become the first emperor of the Qing Dynasty.
