= Luancheng, Hebei =

Luancheng 栾城镇
- Town
- Interactive map of Luancheng
- Coordinates: 37°54′01″N 114°38′54″E
- Country: People's Republic of China
- Province: Hebei
- Prefecture-level city: Shijiazhuang
- District: Luancheng
- Elevation: 55 m (180 ft)
- Time zone: UTC+8 (China Standard Time)

Luancheng (simplified Chinese: 栾城; traditional Chinese: 欒城; pinyin: Luánchéng) is a town in and the seat of Luancheng District of Shijiazhuang, in southwestern Hebei province, China, about 20 km (12 mi) south of the provincial capital of Shijiazhuang along China National Highway 308. As of 2011, it has 47 villages under its administration.

== Transport ==
It is served by the Shijiazhuang Luancheng Airport (IATA: LCT).

== See also ==
- List of township-level divisions of Hebei
