= Wan (khan) =

Jurchen ruler (died July 1582)

- Traditional Chinese: 萬
Transcriptions
Standard Mandarin
- Hanyu Pinyin: Wàn
- Wade–Giles: Wan^{4}

Alternate name
- Traditional Chinese: 王台
Transcriptions
Standard Mandarin
- Hanyu Pinyin: Wáng Tái
- Wade–Giles: Wang^{2}-tai^{2}

Wan (Manchu:ᠸᠠᠨ, died July 1582) was a Haixi Jurchen chieftain, a self-proclaimed Khan (ᡥᠠᠨ, han), and leader of the Hūlun tribal confederacy. A member of the Nara clan and leader of the Hada tribe, he succeeded his uncle Wangju-wailan as beile of the Hada. He was a skilled political leader and the most powerful Jurchen leader of his era, establishing dominance over the Ula, Yehe, and Hoifa tribes, which he organized into the Hūlun tribal confederation. His power waned late into his rule, and the Yehe and Ula broke off from the Hūlun under the leadership of Yangginu. Wan died soon after and was succeeded by his son Hûrhan.

== Biography ==
Wan was a member of the Nara clan, an influential Jurchen noble clan in what is now Northeastern China. He was the grandson of Kesina, a frontier official of the Ming dynasty, and ultimately a descendant of Nacibulu, the beile of the Ula tribe. Wan's uncle, Wangju-wailan, left the Ula and became the beile of the Hada, a Jurchen tribe living east of Kaiyuan. After Wangju-wailan's death, leadership of the Hada passed to Wan.

Wan was a skilled political leader. He established dominance over trade with the Ming at Guangshun Pass, east of Kaiyuan. By the 1570s, his political influence grew to encompass the Ula, Yehe, and Hoifa tribes of the Haixi, which he organized into the Hūlun tribal confederation. He declared the Hada a kingdom and adopted the title of Khan (renderedᡥᠠᠨ, han in Manchu). Wan was the most powerful Jurchen leader of his era; he achieved some degree of political hegemony over both the Haixi and the Jianzhou. He took one of the daughters of Cukungge, a Yehe chieftain defeated and executed by Wangju-wailan, as a concubine. In 1573, Wan was forced to enter a marriage alliance with a group of Mongols to the west of Kaiyuan.

Wan frequently recruited talented officials to his headquarters who were at risk of harm or violence in their home territories. He employed Han Chinese officials as his secretaries, instituted laws, and regularly received tribute from Jurchen and Mongol emissaries. Unlike the nomadic and pastoral Jurchen, he oversaw some degree of agriculture and constructed permanent residences. He gained the favor of the Ming administration by capturing the Jianzhou chief Wang-gao, who had frequently led raids into Chinese territory. At times, he coordinated with the Ming general and governor Li Chengliang. One Chinese source, the Dongyi Kaolue, stated that Wan was a major contributor to peace along the eastern frontier of Liaodong, praising him for obeying the Ming and defending the borderlands. Another account, from the Manzhou Shilu, presents his reign in a less favorable light, charging it with widespread bribery and corruption.

By the early 1580s, Wan's power had waned, partially due to his son Hûrhan, whose behavior was tyrannical and alienating to the Hada's allies. Cukungge's sons, beile Yangginu and Cinggiyanu, sought to regain the independence of the Yehe and avenge their father. They gradually began to assert their autonomy, until Yangginu managed to firmly break off both the Yehe and the Ula from the Hūlun confederation. Wan died in July 1582. After Wan's death, a succession conflict broke out between Hûrhan and Wan's illegitimate son Kanggûru. Kanggûru lost the dispute and went into exile among the Yehe; however, Hûrhan soon died and was succeeded by Menggebulu, another son of Wan. Nurhaci, a Jianzhou chieftain and founder of the Later Jin dynasty, and a son-in-law of Wan, took strong political inspiration from Wan. Later chronicles of the Qing dynasty, led by Nurhaci's descendants, would dub Wan the "lord of the Manchu nations".
