= Mingju =

Qing Dynasty statesman

Grand Secretary of the Wuying Hall
- In office 1677–1688

Minister of Personnel
- In office November 17, 1675 – August 27, 1677 Serving with Ai Yuanzheng (until 1676), Yao Wenran (since 1676)
- Preceded by: Duikana
- Succeeded by: Udari

Minister of War
- In office December 25, 1671 – November 17, 1675 Serving with Zhu Zhibi (until 1673), Wang Xi (since 1673)
- Preceded by: Ke'erkeda
- Succeeded by: Sesehei

Minister of Justice
- In office October 17, 1668 – July 31, 1669 Serving with Zhu Zhibi
- Preceded by: Duikana
- Succeeded by: Duikana

Personal details
- Born: November 19, 1635
- Died: June 3, 1708 (aged 72)
- Relations: Yangginu (paternal great-grandfather); Gintaisi (paternal grandfather); Empress Xiaocigao (grandaunt); Narimbulu (granduncle); Ajige (father-in-law); Shunzhi Emperor (second cousin); Consort Hui (relative, possibly niece); Yinzhi (relative, possibly grandnephew)
- Children: Xingde; Kuiju; Kuifang

Mingju (Manchu:ᠮᡳᠩᠵᡠ, Mölendroff: mingju; Chinese: 明珠; pinyin: Míngzhū, November 19, 1635 – June 3, 1708), of the Manchu Nara clan, was an official of the Qing Dynasty during the reign of the Kangxi Emperor. He was thrown in prison for corruption.

Second cousin to the Shunzhi Emperor, Mingzhu came from an aristocratic line that belonged to the Plain Yellow Banner of the Eight Banners. His grandfather, Gintaisi, was the last prince of the Yehe Nara clan.

In 1677, Mingju was named the Grand Secretary, one of the top-ranking positions, and became involved in a long power struggle with Songgotu throughout the middle years of Kangxi's reign. He was related to Consort Hui, one of the Kangxi Emperor's concubines who bore the emperor his first surviving son, Yinzhi. Consequently, he supported Yinzhi during the struggles for succession.

He was sent to prison for corruption and various other charges in his final years.

He married Ajige's fifth daughter and had at least three sons. His oldest son, Nara Singde, grew up to be a famous poet.
