= Ưu Đàm Hoa =

Phạm Công Lánh
- Born: July 25, 1956 (age 70); Saigon, Republic of Vietnam

Ưu Đàm Hoa ( chữ Hán: 優曇花, born 1956 in Saigon), nickname Master Ưu (優老爺), is a Vietnamese wuxia ("martial arts and chivalry") novelist.

== Biography ==
Ưu Đàm Hoa's background remains a mystery that wuxia fans have always wanted to uncover. Using a pseudonym, he made his literary debut in the end of 1990s enjoying anonymity until 2010 when some of the readers exposed his real name as Phạm Công Lánh (范公另), who resides in 11th district of Saigon. He was born in 1956 in Saigon of South Vietnam.

In the beginning, having been interested in Jin Yong's wuxia stories growing up, he attempted to write some stories when he was 17 with limited success. Before seriously pursuing literature, he has undertaken different jobs with unstable income. He considered adrift fates of characters in The smiling, China the reflection of his impoverished life, especially Nam Cung Giao.

Between 1992 and 1993, Ưu Đàm Hoa listened to his friend and gave up his job at printing firm as well as the eau de rose style to permanently move to another genre known as journey wuxia. Later on, he decided to use the name Ưu Đàm Hoa (優曇花) when his first published novel was critically acclaimed.

As of 2015, there have been 30 literary works including novelettes and purely wuxia novels, most of which mention love affairs, classical references, the beauty of Chinese history and culture. His works usually embedded with verses of Li Shangyin, Li Bai, Du Fu, Bai Juyi, Zhao Ji, Tang Yin, Nalan Xingde with accumulative narrative in the setting of Jiangnan.

== Works ==
Novel makes up the bulk of Ưu Đàm Hoa's literary works, whereas poems, novelettes, journals... written as a dedication to his wife and friends remains unprinted. However, there are some drafts that are not meant to be published and he never disclosed the reason.

=== Poems ===
- A memory for daisies (1993)
- Little bizarre trivia for the new year (1994-5)

=== Novelette ===
- Remembering somebody (1993)

=== Novels ===
1. Bích Nhãn thần quân (碧眼神君)
2. Tình ma (鬼情)
3. Tuyết Hồ công tử (雪湖公子)
4. Kim Giáp môn (金甲門)
5. Du Già đại pháp (瑜伽大法)
6. Ngư Trường kiếm (魚腸劍)
7. Bàn Long đao (盤龍刀)
8. Tiếu ngạo Trung Hoa (笑傲中華)
9. Nga Mi kiếm khách (峨眉劍客)
10. Giang Nam oán lục (江南怨錄)
11. Giang hồ mộng kí (江湖夢記)
12. Tần Nhương Thư (秦穰苴)
13. Võ lâm u linh kí (武林幽靈記)
14. Bạch nhật quỷ hồn (白日鬼魂)
15. Hắc bạch hương hồ kí (黑白香狐記)
16. Trang Tử tam kiếm (莊子三劍)
17. Sơn quỷ (山鬼)
18. Âu Dương Chính Lan (歐陽正蘭)
19. Bạch Hổ tinh quân (白虎星君)
20. Ta Bà phong vân kí (娑婆風雲記)

=== Essays ===
- A short talk (1999)
- Beauty (2016)

== See also ==
- Kim Dung
