= Hulun =

Hulun may refer to:

- Hulun (alliance), historical alliance of Jurchen tribes
- Hulun Buir, city in Inner Mongolia, China
- Lake Hulun, lake in Inner Mongolia, China
