= Loudi, Hebei =

Loudi 楼底镇
- Town
- Location in Hebei
- Coordinates: 37°57′54″N 114°32′19″E
- Country: People's Republic of China
- Province: Hebei
- Prefecture-level city: Shijiazhuang
- District: Luancheng
- Village-level divisions: 16 villages
- Elevation: 66 m (217 ft)
- Time zone: UTC+8 (China Standard)
- Postal code: 051430
- Area code: 0311

Loudi (simplified Chinese: 楼底; traditional Chinese: 樓底; pinyin: Lóudǐ; lit. 'building bottom') is a town of Luancheng District of Shijiazhuang in southwestern Hebei province, China, located in the southern suburbs of Shijiazhuang about 12 kilometres (7.5 mi) northwest of the Luancheng District seat. As of 2011, it has 16 villages under its administration.

== See also ==
- List of township-level divisions of Hebei
