= China National Highway 308 =

Road in China

National Highway 308
- 308国道

Route information
- Length: 637 km (396 mi)

Major junctions
- From: Qingdao, Shandong
- To: Shijiazhuang, Hebei

Location
- Country: China

Highway system
- National Trunk Highway System; Primary; Auxiliary
← G307	→ G309

China National Highway 308 (G308) runs northwest from Qingdao, Shandong towards Shijiazhuang, Hebei. It is 637 kilometres in length.

== Route and distance ==
Route and distance

City	Distance (km)
Qingdao, Shandong	0
Nanquan, Shandong	7
Weifang, Shandong	121
Shouguang, Shandong	159
Zibo, Shandong	219
Zhoucun District, Shandong	238
Zouping, Shandong	248
Zhangqiu, Shandong	272
Jinan, Shandong	318
Qihe, Shandong	360
Gaotang, Shandong	408
Xiajin, Shandong	434
Qinghe County, Hebei	466
Nangong, Hebei	516
Xinhe, Hebei	542
Ningjin, Hebei	576
Zhao County, Hebei	594
Luancheng, Hebei	611
Shijiazhuang, Hebei	637

== See also ==
- China National Highways
