= Baishenshou Township =

Baishenshou Township 白神首乡
- Rural Township
- Báishénshǒu Xiāng
- Location in Hebei Location in China
- Coordinates: 37°31′24″N 115°11′44″E
- Country: People's Republic of China
- Province: Hebei
- Prefecture-level city: Xingtai
- County: Xinhe

Area
  - Total: 43.63 km^{2} (16.85 sq mi)

Population (2010)
  - Total: 17,600
  - Density: 403.4/km^{2} (1,045/sq mi)
- Time zone: UTC+8 (China Standard)

Baishenshou Township (Chinese: 白神首乡; pinyin: Báishénshǒu Xiāng) is a rural township located in Xinhe County, Xingtai, Hebei, China. According to the 2010 census, Baishenshou Township had a population of 17,600, including 8,655 males and 8,945 females. The population was distributed as follows: 2,823 people aged under 14, 13,336 people aged between 15 and 64, and 1,441 people aged over 65.

== See also ==
- List of township-level divisions of Hebei
