= Qiema =

Coordinates: 37°58′35″N 114°37′33″E

Qiema 郄马镇
- Town

Chinese transcription(s)
- Interactive map of Qiema
- Country: China
- Province: Hebei
- Prefecture: Shijiazhuang
- District: Luancheng
- Time zone: UTC+8 (China Standard Time)

Qiema (Chinese: 郄马镇) is a township-level division of Luancheng District, Shijiazhuang, Hebei, China.

== See also ==
- List of township-level divisions of Hebei
