= Xiying Township =

Coordinates: 37°49′55″N 114°34′36″E

Xiying Township 西营乡
- Township

Chinese transcription(s)
- Interactive map of Xiying Township
- Country: China
- Province: Hebei
- Prefecture: Shijiazhuang
- District: Luancheng
- Time zone: UTC+8 (China Standard Time)

Xiying Township (Chinese: 西营乡) is a township-level division of Luancheng District, Shijiazhuang, Hebei, China.

== See also ==
- List of township-level divisions of Hebei
