= Nangao Township =

Nangao Township 南高乡
- Township

Chinese transcription(s)
- Interactive map of Nangao Township
- Coordinates: 37°51′08″N 114°43′57″E
- Country: China
- Province: Hebei
- Prefecture: Shijiazhuang
- District: Luancheng

Area
  - Total: 37.66 km^{2} (14.54 sq mi)

Population (2006)
  - Total: 25,540
- Time zone: UTC+8 (China Standard Time)
- Postal code: 051430

Nangao Township (Chinese: 南高乡) is a township-level division of Luancheng District, Shijiazhuang, Hebei, China.

== See also ==
- List of township-level divisions of Hebei
