= Empress Dowager Xiao =

Empress Dowager Xiao (蕭太后) may refer to:

- Xiao Wenshou (蕭文壽, 343–423), empress dowager of the Liu Song dynasty
- Empress Dowager Xiao (Tang dynasty) (died 847), empress dowager of the Tang dynasty
- Empress Dowager Xiao (Shizong) (died 951), empress dowager of the Liao dynasty, Emperor Shizong's mother
- Empress Xiao Yanyan (蕭燕燕, 953–1009), (932–1009), empress dowager of the Liao dynasty, Emperor Shengzong's mother
- Empress Dowager Xiao Noujin (蕭耨斤, died 1057), empress dowager of the Liao dynasty, Emperor Xingzong's mother
- Empress Dowager Xiao Tali (蕭撻裏, died 1076), empress dowager of the Liao dynasty, Emperor Daozong's mother

== See also ==
- Empress Xiao (disambiguation)
