= Liulintun Township =

Liulintun Township 柳林屯乡
- Township
- Location in Hebei
- Coordinates: 37°53′09″N 114°43′38″E
- Country: People's Republic of China
- Province: Hebei
- Prefecture-level city: Shijiazhuang
- District: Luancheng
- Village-level divisions: 23 villages
- Elevation: 55 m (180 ft)
- Time zone: UTC+8 (China Standard)
- Area code: 0311

Liulintun (Chinese: 柳林屯; pinyin: Liǔlíntún) is a township of Luancheng District of Shijiazhuang in southwestern Hebei province, China, located about 7 kilometres (4.3 mi) east of the county seat. As of 2011, it has 23 villages under its administration.

== See also ==
- List of township-level divisions of Hebei
