= Yehe Nara =

Manchu clan and family name

Manchu name
- Manchu script: ᠶᡝᡥᡝ ᠨᠠᡵᠠ

Chinese name
- Traditional Chinese: 葉赫那拉氏
- Simplified Chinese: 叶赫那拉氏
Transcriptions
Standard Mandarin
- Hanyu Pinyin: yè hè nà lā shì

Pronunciation respelling name
- Pronunciation respelling: YƏ-hə-NAH-rah

The Yehe Nara is one of the main branches of the Nara clan of Manchu origin. It is the family surname of the beile (chieftains) of the Yehe tribe of the Haixi Jurchens. The clan's progenitor was a Mongol named Singgen darhan (Manchu: ᠰᡳᠩᡤᡝᠨ
ᡩᠠᡵᡥᠠᠨ, Chinese: 星根達爾漢), who changed his surname to Nara after capturing the territory of the Hulun state's Zhang City, originally belonging to the Nara clan. His followers later migrated to the Yehe River, hence the name Yehe nation. Singgen Darhan great-grandson, Taicu (太杵), had two sons: Cinggiyanu and Yangginu. The brothers unified the Yehe tribes, each ruling a city and both titled beile. During the times of Gintaisi and Buyanggu, Yehe was annexed by Nurhaci, and its clans and followers were incorporated into the Eight Banners system.

During the Qing dynasty, the Yehe Nara produced many notable families, nobles, civil and military officials. Prominent figures from this clan include Empress Xiaocigao, the mother of Hong Taiji, Suksaha, one of the Four Regents of the early Kangxi era, and Mingju, an important official during the Kangxi reign. Additionally, Empress Dowager Cixi, who held actual power over the Qing Empire for over forty years, was also from the Yehe-Nara clan. Her ancestor, Kazan (喀山), was a resident of the Suwan area in Yehe state. After the founding of the Republic of China, many from the Yehe-Nara clan adopted Han surnames such as Na (那), Ye (叶), Bai (白), Zhang (张), Luo (罗), and Su (苏).

== Prominent families in the Qing dynasty ==
=== Yehe beile clan ===
==== Descendants of Gintaisi ====
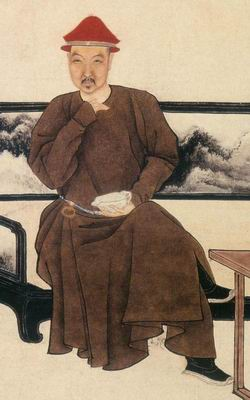
The famous poet Nalan Xingde was the great-grandson of Gintaisi.

After Nurhaci conquered Yehe, the descendants of Gintaisi, beile of the Eastern City, were incorporated into the Manchu Plain Yellow Banner. Gintaisi’s son, Deerge (德尔格) was granted the title of third-class baron. His son Nanchu (南楮) inherited the title but was stripped of it due to misconduct. Nanchu’s brother, Suo'er (索尔), inherited the title, and through several imperial decrees of favor, it was elevated to first-class baron with the additional title of Yun Qiwei (云骑尉, Cloud Cavalry Captain). Suo'er served as Vice Minister of the Ministry of Personnel and as a banner commander but was demoted to second-class baron. Subsequently, the title passed through successive generations: Ese (鄂色), Ganahai (噶纳海), and Bashen (巴什). Bashen’s father, Wudan (武丹), served as General Jianwei (建威) and died in battle against the Dzungars. He was posthumously awarded the title of Yun Qiwei, which was inherited by Bashen, who then received the title of first-class baron. The title was later reverted to second-class baron for hereditary succession.

Gintaisi’s son, Niyaha (尼雅哈), was awarded the hereditary title of cavalry captain due to his contributions. He held the position of Langzhong (郎中, captain). His son Zhengku (郑库) inherited the title and, through several imperial decrees of favor, it was elevated to second-class light chariot captain. His grandson Mingju inherited the title, which was reverted to cavalry captain. Gintaisi’s grandson Mingju was a prominent official during the Kangxi reign, serving as Grand Secretariat of the Hall of Preserving Harmony and as an Inner Minister. His great-grandson Muzhan (穆占) served as General of the South, Kuixu (揆叙) as Left Censor-in-Chief of the Censorate, and Kuifang (揆芳) as Prince Consort of Heshuo (和硕). Other descendants of Gintaisi held various important government positions such as Inner Academy Scholars, guardian of tombs, governors, deputy commanders, guards, commanders, lieutenants, deputy directors, and scribes.

Gintaisi’s younger brother Saibitu’s (赛碧图) son, Shuose (硕色), served as a fifth-rank official, and Saibitu’s grandson Daimu (岱穆) served as a second-class guard and died in battle in Xiamen, Fujian. He was posthumously awarded the title of Yun Qiwei, which was inherited by his son Sandan (三丹). Other descendants of Saibitu held positions such as Guards, Assistant Commanders, Deputy Directors, Scribes, Secretaries, and Ceremonial Officials. Gintaisi’s younger brother Ashan’s (阿山) grandson Baose (保色) served as a class leader in the Imperial Stables, and his great-grandson Liuzhu (留住) served as a captain and banner commander.

==== Descendants of Buyanggu ====
After Nurhaci conquered Yehe, the descendants of Buyanggu, beile of the Western City, were incorporated into the Manchu Plain Red Banner. His brother Buerhangwu (布尔杭武) was granted the title of third-class baron and appointed as a banner commander. By the time his grandson Yintu (音图) inherited the title, he served as General of Girin but lost the title due to misconduct. Buyanggu’s grandson Chaketu (察克图) inherited the banner commander position, and his nephew Garli (噶尔立) inherited the title, achieving merit in campaigns against the Dzungars. He was granted the title of third-class light chariot captain, later changed to the hereditary title of Yun Qiwei. Buerhangwu's other son Shuose (硕色) served as a Junior Imperial Guard, and his grandson Fulata (富拉塔) served as Minister of Justice. Other descendants held positions such as assistant commanders, lieutenants, clerks, guards, secretaries, and writers.

Buyanggu’s younger brother Darhan’s (达尔汉) son, De'ersun (德尔荪), served as a fourth-rank ceremonial official, and his grandson Xizhu (西柱) served as Vice Minister of Justice and banner commander. Other descendants held positions such as assistant commanders, lieutenants, and chancellors.

==== Descendants of Efu Suna ====
Suna (苏纳) of the Plain White Banner was a member of the same clan as Gintaisi. He married a princess and was titled Efu (额驸). He served as Minister of War and also held the position of a banner commander. Due to his military achievements in Guangning, Jinzhou, Daling, and Ningyuan, he was granted immunity from death four times and awarded the title of third-class light chariot captain. Later, he was stripped of his position due to misconduct. His son, Suksaha, inherited the position of banner commander. Due to his military achievements in Jinzhou and Songshan, he was awarded the title of cavalry captain. Through several imperial decrees of favor, he was elevated to third-class light chariot captain. The Qing court, in recognition of Suna's long service, restored the title of third-class light chariot captain and merged it with Suksaha's original hereditary title, making him a third-class baron. Later, Suksaha was promoted to second-class viscount due to imperial favor and his military achievements in Huguang and other places. He served as an Inner Minister, a regent, but was forced to commit suicide by the powerful minister Oboi. In the eighth year of the Kangxi reign, after Oboi's downfall, Suksaha's descendants were rehabilitated, and the Kangxi Emperor restored their hereditary titles. When his grandson Zhongshenbao (众神保) inherited the title, it was changed to third-class baron. Besides Suksaha, Suna had several other sons, including Kongguji (孔固济), who was a Doroi Efu, Sumara (苏玛拉), who served as a first-class guard, and Maise (迈色), who served as a second-class guard. Other descendants of Suna held various positions such as guards, Langzhong, clerks, and banner commanders. Suksaha's eldest son, Zhakedan (札克丹), served as an Inner Minister and was executed along with his father.

Suna Efu's paternal uncle, Baisihu's (拜思瑚) son, Ayusi, served as a clerk and was awarded the title of Yun Qiwei due to his satisfactory performance. Through several imperial decrees of favor and military achievements in Jinzhou and Jiangxi, he was promoted to second-class light chariot captain but later demoted to third-class light chariot captain due to misconduct, eventually serving as a deputy commander. His grandson, Duliku (都理库), inherited the position and was awarded the title of second-class light chariot captain for his military achievements in the Dzungar campaign. His descendants later adjusted the title to cavalry captain. Other descendants of Baisihu served in various positions such as guards, assistant commanders, clerks, lieutenants, banner commanders, writers, and clerks. Among them, Baisihu's son, Badana (巴达纳), was titled Efu, and his great-grandson, Erge (二格), served as a minister of the Privy Council, Minister of Works, and Deputy Censor-in-Chief of the Censorate.

==== Others ====
Ashen (阿什) Darhan of the Plain White Banner was Gintaisi's brother. He served as a banner commander and was awarded the title of first-class light chariot captain for his military achievements in Liaodong. He later served as Minister of the Court of Colonial Affairs. In the sixth year of the Tiancong reign, he was given the honorary title of "Uncle" by the Khan Hong Taiji because he was the brother of Empress Dowager Xiaocigao. Ashen Darhan earned further military merits during the Korean campaign and was promoted to third-class baron but was later demoted to cavalry captain due to misconduct. His son, Xidari (席达理), inherited the title and earned multiple military merits, eventually being promoted to first-class light chariot captain. His descendants' titles fluctuated, but his great-grandson, Nayantai (纳延泰), settled on the title of third-class light chariot captain. Other descendants of Ashen Darhan served in various positions such as guards, defenders, and assistant commanders.

Baierhetu (柏尔赫图) of the same banner, related to Gintaisi, served as a forward banner commander. He earned multiple military merits in battles at Jinzhou, the southern campaigns, and capturing the Yongli Emperor of the Southern Ming in Burma. He was awarded the title of first-class baron. His third son, Bairken (柏尔肯), inherited the title, served as a minister without portfolio and banner commander, and was later granted the title of third-class viscount due to his father's previous military achievements. His son, Baiqing’e (柏清额), inherited the title and served as deputy commander. Baierhetu's eldest son, Sehe (色赫), served as a guard commander and died in battle against Ma Bao (马宝) in Yanshanling, Huguang, and was posthumously awarded the title of Yun Qiwei. Baierhetu's second son, Arsai, served as a censor, and other descendants held various positions such as banner commanders, clerks, and more.

Other members of the same clan as Gintaisi included Huniu (瑚钮), Esen (额森), Husala (瑚沙喇), Gangada (刚阿达), Harsai (哈尔萨), Aimintaiji (爱敏台济), Badang’a (巴当阿), Bayali (巴雅理), and Buyantu (布彦图). Huniu served as a guard commander, earned military merits in campaigns in Sichuan and Yangping Pass, and was posthumously awarded the title of cavalry captain. His son, Yanbu (颜布), inherited the title and earned military merits in campaigns in Yunnan, being awarded the title of Yun Qiwei. Esen's great-grandson, Qina (启纳), served as a seventh-rank official and earned military merits in campaigns against the Chahars and was awarded the title of Yun Qiwei. Esen's nephew, Budangqili (布当奇理), served as a guard commander and earned military merits in Jinzhou, Shandong, Henan, and Jiangnan, being awarded the title of cavalry captain. Husala's grandson, Sehe (色赫), served as a guard commander and earned military merits in campaigns in Shandong, Chahar, and Yunnan, being awarded the title of cavalry captain. Gangada surrendered before the fall of Yehe and was awarded the title of lieutenant general. Harsai, Aimintaiji, Badang’a, Bayali, and Buyantu did not have hereditary titles.

Among other clans, Harson'a (哈尔松阿) of the Plain Yellow Banner, Abai (阿拜) of the Plain Red Banner, Kexine (克锡讷), Bayan (巴颜), and others of the Bordered White Banner were also related to Gintaisi. Harson'a's grandson, Hayartu (哈雅尔图), served as Minister of the Court of Colonial Affairs and a minister of the Privy Council. His great-grandson, Baizhuhu (拜珠瑚), served as a military officer and earned military merits in Yunnan, being awarded the title of Yun Qiwei. Harson'a's paternal uncle, Zhehe's (哲赫) fourth-generation grandson, Shuangbao (双保), was awarded the title of Yun Qiwei for his military merits. Abai's son, Nomutu (诺谟图), was an Efu. Kexine's grandson, Bozhili (博济理), served as a guardian of tombs, and Namutaiwozihe (纳穆泰倭济赫) earned military merits in campaigns in Heilongjiang and was awarded the title of cavalry captain and served as a banner commander. His son, Seleng’e (色楞额), inherited the title and through several imperial decrees of favor, was elevated to second-class light chariot captain. Kexine's great-grandson, Aisongwu (爱松武), served as a deputy director and earned military merits in campaigns in Taiyuan and Mongolia, being awarded the titles of cavalry captain and Yun Qiwei. Kexine's great-grandson, Baketa (巴克塔), served as a clerk and participated in suppressing the Rebellion of the Three Feudatories in Sichuan, dying in the rebellion of Wang Fuchen, and was posthumously awarded the title of Yun Qiwei. Other descendants of Kexine served in various positions such as scholars, guards, assistant commanders, military officers, gatekeepers, writers, banner commanders, and clerks. Bayan did not have hereditary titles.

Other members of the same clan as Gintaisi in the Bordered Blue Banner included Huxibu (瑚锡布), Gusan'tai (固三泰), Shaozhan (韶瞻), Subahai (苏霸海), Hetuo (和托), Anabu (阿那布), Shangjinu (商吉努), Jimutu (济穆图), and others. Huxibu served as a banner commander and was awarded the title of cavalry captain, inherited by his son Daiku (岱库). Huxibu's other son, Muchene (穆彻讷), served as a guard commander and earned military merits in campaigns in Mongolia, Shanxi, and Guangdong, being awarded the title of third-class light chariot captain. His descendants' titles fluctuated, but the title of cavalry captain was settled for hereditary succession. Other descendants of Huxibu served as guard commanders, guards, and banner commanders. Gusan'tai served as a banner commander and commander-in-chief. His son, Gertu (格尔图), succeeded as banner commander, and Minga'tu (明阿图) served as acting deputy commander, earning the title of cavalry captain for his military merits in campaigns. His descendants held various positions, including deputy commander and assistant commander. During the Qing invasion, he served in the rear guard and was honored with the title of cavalry commander for his achievements. Later, due to his capable administration, he was promoted to the hereditary position of Yun Qiwei. Additionally, Gusantai's great-grandson Zengshu (增舒) served as deputy Minister of Public Works in Shengjing, and Ha'er Tai (哈尔泰) served as scholar in the Hanlin Academy. Ashan's (阿山) son, Aisai (爱赛), died in battle against Zhang Chun (张春), a Ming dynasty commander, in Jinzhou, and was posthumously awarded the title of Yun Qiwei. His grandson, Hese (和色), inherited the title and earned military merits in campaigns in Huguang, Guangdong, and Yunnan, being awarded the title of second-class light chariot captain. Shaozhan served as a guard commander and died in battle in Hengzhou, Huguang, being posthumously awarded the title of Yun Qiwei. Subahai, Hetuo, Anabu, Shangjinu, and Jimutu did not have hereditary titles.

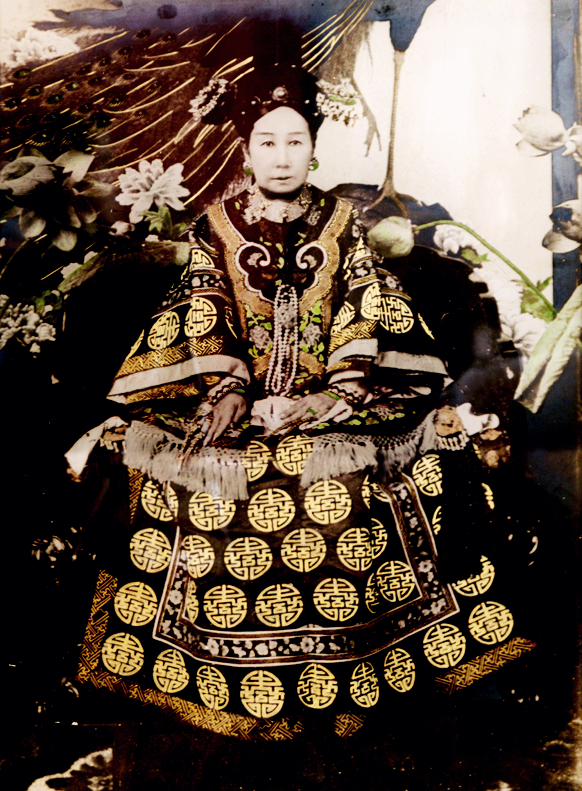
Empress Dowager Cixi was the eighth-generation granddaughter of Kasan.

=== Kasan Family ===
Kasan (喀山) of the Bordered Blue Banner resided in the Suwan area of Yehe State. Unlike the Yehe beile family, Kasan's family belonged to a different branch. Before the Later Jin (predecessor of the Qing dynasty) conquered Yehe, the entire Kasan family had already surrendered to Nurhaci and was granted the title of Cavalry Captain. Due to repeated military achievements and three imperial decrees of favor, Kasan was awarded the title of second-class viscount and posthumously honored with the title of Minzhuang. A memorial stone was erected in his honor. His son, Nahai (纳海), served as a banner commander and was awarded the title of Yun Qiwei for his contributions in defeating Hong Chengchou at Songshan and Xing Mountain. Through three imperial decrees of favor, he was promoted to third-class light chariot captain and, upon inheriting his father Kasan’s title, was also given the title of second-class count. After his death without an heir, the title was inherited by his younger brother Naqin's (纳亲) grandson, Qishan (奇善), who held the title of hereditary first-class baron and Yun Qiwei. After Qishan, his son Kaying'a (喀英阿) and grandson Zhalanga (札郎阿) inherited the title, and the line continued with Zhalanga's branch until the late Qing dynasty. Zhalanga's brother, Jilanga's (吉郎阿) great-granddaughter, was Empress Dowager Cixi, the mother of the Tongzhi Emperor. Cixi’s brother, Guixiang (桂祥), inherited the title of third-class En Gong (恩公), and Guixiang's daughter was Empress Dowager Longyu. The Kasan family held two positions as hereditary banner commanders within the Eight Banners, with other descendants serving as banner commanders, guards, clerks, and other official positions.

Kasan’s paternal cousin Wentuohun's (温托浑) great-grandson, Xinzhu (新柱), served as a clerk and was killed on a mission to Yunnan, posthumously awarded the title of cavalry captain. Other descendants of Wentuohun held various positions such as banner commanders, assistant commanders, military officers, guards, ceremonial officials, and writers.

=== Hoifa beile Clan ===
Turkun (图尔坤), Baxi (巴禧), Namuzhan (纳穆占), and Wenbulu (温布禄) of the Plain Blue Banner, along with Baji Lan (巴奇兰) of the Bordered Red Banner, who lived in Yibadan (伊巴丹), and Tonggui (通贵) of the Hoifa beile family, were of the same clan. Turkun's grandson, Zhonggui (钟贵), served as an associate in the Office of Communications and was killed in action in Hengzhou, Huguang, and posthumously awarded the title of Yun Qiwei. Other descendants of Turkun served as clerks, captains, writers, clerks, guards, and military officers. Baxi, during Nurhaci's founding period, led his descendants to surrender and was awarded the title of Yun Qiwei, stationed in Sijianfang. During this period, Baxi gathered 56 people who had fled from Yehe and led them as a banner commander. When his son, Suiha (和色), inherited the title, he was promoted to third-class light chariot captain through three imperial decrees of favor. When Baxi’s great-grandson, Chang Guli (常古理), inherited the title, it was reverted to Yun Qiwei. Other descendants of Baxi served as banner commanders, military officers, and personal guards. Baxi's brother, Bazar (巴扎尔), served as a defender, and his nephew Jinggurdai (敬古尔岱) served as a clerk. His grandsons, Zongshenbao (宗神保) and Nading (纳定), served as military officers. Descendants of Namuzhan held positions such as military officers, guards, and cavalry officers. Wenbulu’s son, Darhan, served as a military officer.

=== Others ===
- Gulugechuhuer (古鲁格楚瑚尔) of the Plain White Banner received the title of First Class Duke for his contributions in rallying the remnants of Tumet in Guihua City to submit to the Later Jin. He was granted command over a company and stationed at Guihua City. When the Qing army entered the Central Plains, he was bestowed the hereditary title of Third Class Duke and served as a commander.
- Emoketu (鄂谟克图) of the Plain Blue Banner was awarded the title of Baturu (a warrior title) and Third Class Light Chariot Commander for being the first to scale the walls during the campaign against Bao'an City. He achieved numerous military successes in Heilongjiang, Shandong, Jinzhou, Qingdu, and Sichuan, eventually being promoted to First Class Duke. He held the position of vice commander-in-chief and was posthumously honored with the title Xiangzhuang (襄壮). His son, Chuoshiqi (绰世琦), and others successively inherited his title. Another son, Chundui (春对), served as a company commander and earned the title of Yun Qiwei for his merits in the Yunnan campaign.
- Wudaha (吴达哈) of the Bordered Red Banner was a company commander, succeeded by his son Nikan (尼堪) and grandson Yangge (杨格), both serving as company commanders. Wudaha's younger brother, Hetuo (和托), served as a military officer and distinguished himself in campaigns in Beijing, Shandong, Heilongjiang, Jinzhou, and Shanhaiguan. He was awarded the title of Second Class Light Chariot Commander and, after several assessments and imperial edicts, was promoted to First Class Light Chariot Commander with Yun Qiwei privileges. His son, Kepusuo (科普索), inherited the title and, after receiving two imperial edicts, was promoted to Second Class Baron. He died in battle at Maolu Mountain during the Huguang campaign and was posthumously honored as First Class Baron with Yun Qiwei privileges, with his title divided between his two sons.

Additionally, various other families from different banners, including Xinggeli (星格理), Laidou (赖都), Fuhachan (福哈禅), and Wutai (武泰) of the Bordered Yellow Banner; Botun (博屯) and Subahai (苏巴海) of the Plain Yellow Banner; Abutai (阿布泰), Baban (巴班), and Kenjike (肯济克) of the Plain White Banner; Andali (安达理) of the Plain Red Banner; and Esai (额塞), Sahai (萨海), and Suhe (苏赫) of the Bordered White Banner, held hereditary titles such as Light Chariot Commander, Cavalry Commander, and Yu Qiwei. Baban and Deken (德肯) of the same banner and region were of the same clan.

== Modern notables ==
Calligrapher Ye Shimeng was born into the Plain Blue Banner and was the son of Zuilin, the Governor-General of Liangguang. Sinologist Ye Jiaying's ancestors were from the Plain Yellow Banner, and her grandfather Zhongxing was a translator jinshi in the eighteenth year of Guangxu. Other notable figures with claimed descent from the Yehe Nara clan include Kunqu opera actor Ye Yangxi, writer Ye Guangqin, singer Na Ying, businesswoman Chen Lihua, host Na Wei, actors Na Wei-hsun and Kara Wai.

== Genetics ==
In the 23Mofang database, 40% of the Yehe Nara clan have haplogroup C, and 20% have C-MF46267, which descended from C-M407, the same branch as Dayan Khan. C-M407 is also widespread among Buryats and Oirats, suggesting that they may share similar paternal origins with the Yehe Nara clan.

== Bibliography ==
- 鄂尔泰; et al. (1985). 八旗通志初集 (in Chinese). Northeast Normal University Press.
- 弘昼等; et al. (2002). 八旗满洲氏族通谱 (in Chinese). Liaohai Publishing House. ISBN 9787806691892.
- 金毓黻; (清) 杨同桂 (1985). 辽海丛书·沈故 (in Chinese). 辽沈书社.
- 刘庆华 (2010). 满族家谱序评注 (in Chinese). Liaoning Nationalities Publishing House. ISBN 9787807229445.
- 赵尔巽等; et al. (1998). 清史稿 (in Chinese). Zhonghua Book Company. ISBN 9787101007503.
- 赵力 (2012). 满族姓氏寻根词典 (in Chinese). Liaoning Nationalities Publishing House. ISBN 9787549702862.
