= Empress Ula Nara =

Empress Ula Nara may refer to:

- Lady Abahai (1590–1626), consort of Nurhaci of the Later Jin dynasty
- Empress Xiaojingxian (1681–1731), consort of the Yongzheng Emperor

== See also ==
- Empress Nara
- Empress Yehe Nara (disambiguation)
