= Douyu (town) =

Douyu 窦妪镇
- Town
- Location in Hebei
- Coordinates: 37.90066°N 114.50354°E
- Country: People's Republic of China
- Province: Hebei
- Prefecture-level city: Shijiazhuang
- District: Luancheng
- Village-level divisions: 17 villages
- Elevation: 66 m (217 ft)
- Time zone: UTC+8 (China Standard)
- Area code: 0311

Douyu (simplified Chinese: 窦妪; traditional Chinese: 竇嫗; pinyin: Dòuyù) is a town of Luancheng District of Shijiazhuang in southwestern Hebei province, China, located 12 kilometres (7.5 mi) west of the county seat and about the same distance south of Shijiazhuang near the interchange of G20 Qingdao–Yinchuan Expressway with China National Highway 107. In 2011, it had 17 villages under its administration.

== See also ==
- List of township-level divisions of Hebei
