= Shijiazhuang Luancheng Airport =

Shijiazhuang Luancheng Airport 石家庄栾城机场
- IATA: LCT; ICAO: none

Summary
- Airport type: Public
- Operator: Hebei Airport Management Group
- Serves: Shijiazhuang, Hebei
- Location: Luancheng, Luancheng District, Hebei
- Hub for: Hebei Airlines
- Elevation AMSL: 70 m / 230 ft
- Coordinates: 37°54′47″N 114°35′30″E
- Website: www.hebeiairport.cn/

Map
- Location within Shijiazhuang LCT (Hebei) LCT (China) LCT (Asia) LCT (Earth)

Runways
Direction	Length		Surface
Direction	m	ft	Surface
17/35	1,500	4,921	Concrete
- Source: IATA

Shijiazhuang Luancheng Airport
- Simplified Chinese: 石家庄栾城机场
- Traditional Chinese: 石家莊欒城機場
Transcriptions
Standard Mandarin
- Hanyu Pinyin: Shíjiāzhuāng Luánchéng Jīchǎng

Shijiazhuang Luancheng Airport (IATA: LCT) is a small airport serving Shijiazhuang, the capital of Hebei province, China. It is located near Luancheng, the head of the Luancheng District in the Hebei province. The main airport serving Shijiazhuang is Shijiazhuang Zhengding International Airport.

== See also ==
- Shijiazhuang Zhengding International Airport
- List of airports in China
