= Empress Xiao =

Empress Xiao may refer to:

== Empresses with the surname Xiao 蕭 ==
- Empress Xiao (Sui dynasty) (566–648), empress consort of the Sui dynasty
- Xiao Wen (蕭溫, died 936), married to Emperor Taizong of Liao
- Xiao Sagezhi (蕭撒葛只, died 951), married to Emperor Shizong of Liao
- Empress Xiao, married to Emperor Muzong of Liao
- Xiao Yanyan (蕭燕燕, 953–1009), married to Emperor Jingzong of Liao
- Empress Xiao (deposed, personal information unknown) Emperor Shengzong of Liao's first empress
- Xiao Pusage (蕭菩薩哥) (983–1032), Emperor Shengzong of Liao's second empress
- Xiao Sanqian (蕭三蒨), Emperor Xingzong of Liao's first empress
- Xiao Tali (蕭撻裏, died 1076), Emperor Xingzong of Liao's second empress
- Xiao Guanyin (蕭觀音, 1040–1075), Emperor Daozong of Liao's first empress
- Xiao Tansi (蕭坦思, died 1118), Emperor Daozong of Liao's second empress
- Xiao Duolilan (蕭奪裏懶), married to Emperor Tianzuo of Liao
- Empress Xiao, Yelü Dashi's first empress
- Xiao Tabuyan (蕭塔不煙), Yelü Dashi's second empress
- Empress Xiao, married to Yelü Zhilugu, emperor of Qara Khitai

== Filial Empress 孝皇后 ==
- Yu Daolian (died 366), Jin dynasty empress, posthumously known as Empress Xiao
- Empress Xiaocigao (Ming dynasty) (1332–1382), wife to the Hongwu Emperor
- Empress Xiaocigao (Qing dynasty) (1575–1603), wife to Nurhaci, Khan of Later Jin
- Empress Xiaoduanwen (1599–1649), Qing dynasty empress, wife to Hong Taiji, Qing Emperor
- Empress Xiaozhuangwen (1613–1688), Qing dynasty imperial consort to Hong Taiji, Qing Emperor, posthumously created Empress by her son the Shunzhi Emperor
- Empress Xiaochengren (1654–1674), Qing dynasty empress, wife to the Kangxi Emperor
- Empress Xiaogongren (1660–1723), Qing dynasty imperial consort to Kangxi Emperor, posthumously created Empress by her son the Yongzheng Emperor
- Empress Xiaoshengxian (1692–1777), Qing dynasty imperial consort to Yongzheng Emperor, posthumously created Empress by her son the Qianlong Emperor
- Empress Xiaojingxian (1681–1731), Qing dynasty empress, wife to the Yongzheng Emperor
- Empress Xiaoxianchun (1712–1748), Qing dynasty empress, wife to the Qianlong Emperor
- Empress Xiaoyichun (1727–1775), Qing dynasty imperial consort to Qianlong Emperor, posthumously created as an empress by her son the Jiaqing Emperor
- Empress Xiaoshurui (1760–1797), Qing dynasty empress, first empress to the Jiaqing Emperor
- Empress Xiaoherui (1776–1860), Qing dynasty empress, second empress to the Jiaqing Emperor
- Empress Xiaoshencheng (1792–1833), Qing dynasty empress, first empress to Daoguang the Emperor
- Empress Xiaoquancheng (1808–1840), Qing dynasty empress, second empress to the Daoguang Emperor and birth mother of the Xianfeng Emperor
- Empress Xiaojingcheng (1812–1855), Qing dynasty imperial consort to Daoguang Emperor, posthumously created Empress by her adopted son the Xianfeng Emperor
- Empress Xiaozheyi (1854–1875), Qing dynasty empress, wife to Tongzhi Emperor

== See also ==
- Empress Dowager Xiao (disambiguation)
- Consort Xiao (disambiguation)
