= Xinhe County, Hebei =

Xinhe County 新河县 Sinho
- County
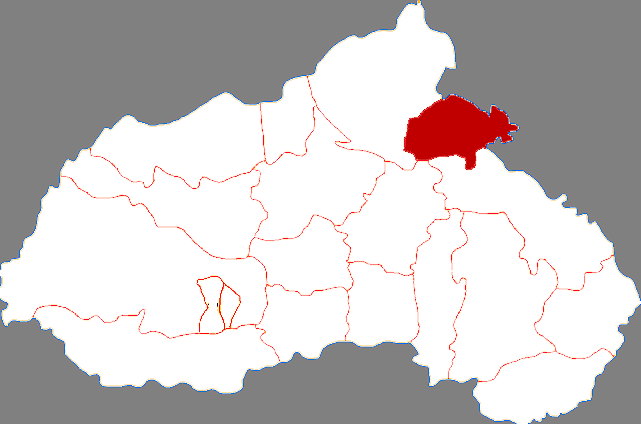
- Xinhe in Xingtai

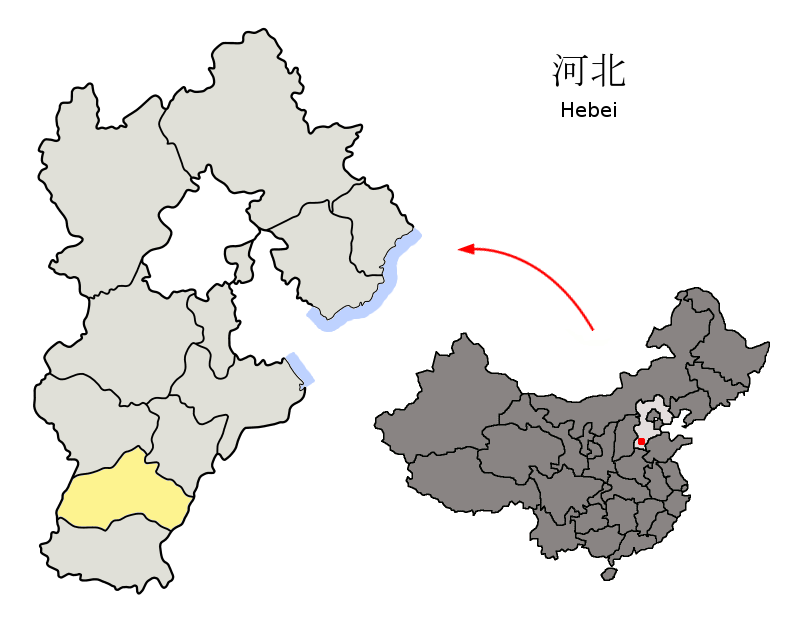
- Xingtai in Hebei
- Coordinates: 37°31′12″N 115°14′20″E
- Country: People's Republic of China
- Province: Hebei
- Prefecture-level city: Xingtai
- County seat: Xinhe Town (新河镇)

Area
  - Total: 366 km^{2} (141 sq mi)
- Elevation: 29 m (95 ft)

Population
  - Total: 170,000
  - Density: 460/km^{2} (1,200/sq mi)
- Time zone: UTC+8 (China Standard)
- Postal code: 051730

Xinhe (Chinese: 新河; pinyin: Xīnhé; lit. 'new river') is a county in the south of Hebei province, China, located on the Fuyang River (滏阳河), which is part of the Hai River watershed. It is under the administration of the prefecture-level city of Xingtai, with a population of 170,000 residing in an area of 366 km^{2} (141 sq mi). The county is served by G20 Qingdao–Yinchuan Expressway and China National Highway 308.

== Administrative divisions ==
There are 2 towns (镇) and 4 townships (乡):

Towns:

- Xinhe (新河镇), Xunzhai (寻寨镇)

Townships:

- Baishenshou Township (白神首乡), Jingjiazhuang Township (荆家庄乡), Xiliu Township (西流乡), Renrangli Township (仁让里乡)

== Climate ==
Climate data for Xinhe, elevation 26 m (85 ft), (1991–2020 normals, extremes 1981–2010)
| Month | Jan | Feb | Mar | Apr | May | Jun | Jul | Aug | Sep | Oct | Nov | Dec | Year |
|---|---|---|---|---|---|---|---|---|---|---|---|---|---|
| Record high °C (°F) | 17.5 (63.5) | 24.2 (75.6) | 32.3 (90.1) | 34.7 (94.5) | 40.4 (104.7) | 40.8 (105.4) | 42.7 (108.9) | 37.9 (100.2) | 37.8 (100.0) | 33.0 (91.4) | 27.1 (80.8) | 21.6 (70.9) | 42.7 (108.9) |
| Mean daily maximum °C (°F) | 3.4 (38.1) | 7.7 (45.9) | 14.9 (58.8) | 22.2 (72.0) | 27.9 (82.2) | 32.4 (90.3) | 32.4 (90.3) | 30.7 (87.3) | 27.1 (80.8) | 21.1 (70.0) | 11.9 (53.4) | 4.9 (40.8) | 19.7 (67.5) |
| Daily mean °C (°F) | −2.5 (27.5) | 1.4 (34.5) | 8.2 (46.8) | 15.3 (59.5) | 21.4 (70.5) | 26.1 (79.0) | 27.6 (81.7) | 26.0 (78.8) | 20.9 (69.6) | 14.3 (57.7) | 5.8 (42.4) | −0.7 (30.7) | 13.7 (56.6) |
| Mean daily minimum °C (°F) | −6.9 (19.6) | −3.4 (25.9) | 2.5 (36.5) | 9.3 (48.7) | 15.1 (59.2) | 20.3 (68.5) | 23.3 (73.9) | 22.1 (71.8) | 16.1 (61.0) | 9.0 (48.2) | 1.1 (34.0) | −4.8 (23.4) | 8.6 (47.6) |
| Record low °C (°F) | −19.4 (−2.9) | −17.2 (1.0) | −10.1 (13.8) | −0.6 (30.9) | 5.4 (41.7) | 10.8 (51.4) | 17.1 (62.8) | 12.8 (55.0) | 5.5 (41.9) | −2.6 (27.3) | −13.8 (7.2) | −22.7 (−8.9) | −22.7 (−8.9) |
| Average precipitation mm (inches) | 2.2 (0.09) | 6.2 (0.24) | 7.8 (0.31) | 25.0 (0.98) | 43.8 (1.72) | 53.9 (2.12) | 133.0 (5.24) | 106.0 (4.17) | 39.2 (1.54) | 25.5 (1.00) | 15.0 (0.59) | 3.3 (0.13) | 460.9 (18.13) |
| Average precipitation days (≥ 0.1 mm) | 1.7 | 3.0 | 2.5 | 5.3 | 6.3 | 7.8 | 10.4 | 9.5 | 6.5 | 5.1 | 3.7 | 2.3 | 64.1 |
| Average snowy days | 2.8 | 2.9 | 1.0 | 0.2 | 0 | 0 | 0 | 0 | 0 | 0 | 1.2 | 2.2 | 10.3 |
| Average relative humidity (%) | 61 | 57 | 53 | 56 | 58 | 59 | 73 | 77 | 73 | 67 | 68 | 65 | 64 |
| Mean monthly sunshine hours | 156.3 | 163.7 | 216.6 | 235.4 | 262.8 | 227.2 | 187.5 | 185.6 | 182.2 | 182.6 | 153.8 | 149.3 | 2,303 |
| Percentage possible sunshine | 51 | 53 | 58 | 59 | 60 | 52 | 42 | 45 | 49 | 53 | 51 | 50 | 52 |
Source: China Meteorological Administration
