= Luancheng, Shijiazhuang =

Luancheng 栾城区 Lwancheng
- District
- Interactive map of Luancheng
- Location in Hebei Luancheng (Shijiazhuang)
- Coordinates: 37°54′01″N 114°38′54″E
- Country: People's Republic of China
- Province: Hebei
- Prefecture-level city: Shijiazhuang

Area
  - Total: 347 km^{2} (134 sq mi)

Population
  - Total: 328,933
  - Density: 948/km^{2} (2,460/sq mi)
- Time zone: UTC+8 (China Standard)

Luancheng District (simplified Chinese: 栾城区; traditional Chinese: 欒城區; pinyin: Luánchéng Qū; lit. 'Golden Rain Tree City') is one of eight districts of the prefecture-level city of Shijiazhuang, the capital of Hebei Province, North China. Luancheng is a mostly rural district covering the southeast outskirts of Shijiazhuang.

In 2004, some parts of Luancheng were ceded to divisions of the urban area of Shijiazhuang, because Shijiazhuang is undergoing rapid development and its current geographical size doesn't meet the demands.

== Administrative divisions ==
Towns:

- Luancheng Town (栾城镇), Qiema (郄马镇), Yehe (冶河镇), Douyu (窦妪镇), Loudi (楼底镇)

Townships:

- Nangao Township (南高乡), Liulintun Township (柳林屯乡), Xiying Township (西营乡)

== Climate ==
Climate data for Luancheng, elevation 53 m (174 ft), (1991–2020 normals, extremes 1981–2010)
Month	Jan	Feb	Mar	Apr	May	Jun	Jul	Aug	Sep	Oct	Nov	Dec	Year
Record high °C (°F)	17.4 (63.3)	25.2 (77.4)	32.1 (89.8)	32.9 (91.2)	38.7 (101.7)	41.6 (106.9)	42.6 (108.7)	36.7 (98.1)	37.6 (99.7)	34.1 (93.4)	26.5 (79.7)	23.1 (73.6)	42.6 (108.7)
Mean daily maximum °C (°F)	3.5 (38.3)	7.7 (45.9)	14.8 (58.6)	21.6 (70.9)	27.4 (81.3)	32.4 (90.3)	32.6 (90.7)	30.8 (87.4)	27.1 (80.8)	20.8 (69.4)	11.5 (52.7)	4.8 (40.6)	19.6 (67.2)
Daily mean °C (°F)	−1.8 (28.8)	1.9 (35.4)	8.5 (47.3)	15.4 (59.7)	21.3 (70.3)	26.3 (79.3)	27.6 (81.7)	26.0 (78.8)	21.5 (70.7)	14.9 (58.8)	6.3 (43.3)	−0.1 (31.8)	14.0 (57.2)
Mean daily minimum °C (°F)	−6.1 (21.0)	−2.9 (26.8)	3.1 (37.6)	9.6 (49.3)	15.4 (59.7)	20.6 (69.1)	23.2 (73.8)	22.0 (71.6)	16.7 (62.1)	10.0 (50.0)	2.1 (35.8)	−3.9 (25.0)	9.2 (48.5)
Record low °C (°F)	−18.1 (−0.6)	−19.7 (−3.5)	−7.6 (18.3)	−3.0 (26.6)	3.1 (37.6)	9.9 (49.8)	16.4 (61.5)	13.8 (56.8)	3.6 (38.5)	−2.8 (27.0)	−15.1 (4.8)	−23.9 (−11.0)	−23.9 (−11.0)
Average precipitation mm (inches)	2.4 (0.09)	5.0 (0.20)	9.9 (0.39)	26.3 (1.04)	40.1 (1.58)	56.2 (2.21)	133.1 (5.24)	136.9 (5.39)	48.9 (1.93)	26.7 (1.05)	15.6 (0.61)	3.1 (0.12)	504.2 (19.85)
Average precipitation days (≥ 0.1 mm)	1.8	2.6	2.8	4.9	6.2	8.4	11.1	10.5	7.3	5.1	3.6	2.2	66.5
Average snowy days	2.4	2.4	1.0	0.2	0	0	0	0	0	0	1.2	2.4	9.6
Average relative humidity (%)	56	51	49	55	58	57	72	76	69	63	64	60	61
Mean monthly sunshine hours	147.7	164.4	212.4	233.5	261.6	228.8	189.7	186.4	182.4	178.0	142.0	134.7	2,261.6
Percentage possible sunshine	48	53	57	59	59	52	43	45	50	52	47	46	51
Source: China Meteorological Administration

== Transport ==
Luancheng District is served by the Shijiazhuang Luancheng Airport (IATA: LCT).
