= Xiao Fuxing =

Chinese novelist (born 1947)

- 肖复兴
- Born: 1947 (age 78–79); Beijing, China
- Education: Central Academy of Drama
- Occupation: Novelist
- Children: 1
- Writing career
- Language: Chinese
- Period: 1988–present
- Genre: Novel、reportage
- Subject: Laosanjie (老三届)
- Notable works: The Puppy Love; A Female Middle School Student's Diary; The Youth Sonata

Xiao Fuxing (simplified Chinese: 肖复兴; traditional Chinese: 肖復興; pinyin: Xiāo Fùxīng; born 1947) is a Chinese novelist. He is now the associate editor for People's Literature.

== Biography ==
Xiao was born in Beijing in 1947, with his ancestral home in Cangzhou, Hebei. His father was an office clerk and his family had 6 members.

When he was a junior graduate student, his composition A Portray (Chinese: 一幅画像) won first prize in the Beijing Youth Session Competition.

From 1971 to 1974, during the Cultural Revolution, Xiao worked in Qixing Farm (Chinese: 七星农场) as a farmer. In 1974, Xiao returned to Beijing taught in a school. Xiao was admitted into the Central Academy of Drama in 1978 and taught there after he graduated.

In 1983, Xiao joined the China Writers Association.

From 1988 to 2000, Xiao published the novels The Puppy Love (Chinese: 早恋), A Female Middle School Student's Diary (Chinese: 一个女中学生的日记) and The Youth Sonata (Chinese: 青春奏鸣曲).

In 2006, Xiao published his novels My Youth Memoirs (Chinese: 黑白记忆：我的青春回忆录).

== Works ==
=== Long-gestating novels ===
- The Puppy Love (Chinese: 早恋)
- A Female Middle School Student's Diary
- The Youth Sonata (Chinese: 青春奏鸣曲)
- The story of Beijing (Chinese: 京城旧事)

=== Reportage ===
- Talking to the Middle Student (Chinese: 和当代中学生对话)
- Writing Letters to Middle Student (Chinese: 和当代中学生写信)
- Mr.Ye (Chinese: 叶圣陶先生)
- A Small House on The Coast of Ocean (Chinese: 海边的一间小屋)
- Being The Hero (Chinese: 生当作人杰)
- Tongfei Sketch (Chinese: 《童非素描》)

=== Prose and essay ===
- My Note (Chinese: 我的读书笔记)
- The Note of Music (Chinese: 音乐笔记)
- Thinking of Qin E (Chinese: 忆秦娥)

== Awards ==
- The story of Beijing – Shanghai Literary Award
- The Note of Music – 1st Bing Xin Prose Prize
- A Small House on The Coast of Ocean – 2nd National Excellent Reportage Literary Award
- Being The Hero – 3rd National Excellent Reportage Literary Award
- Thinking of Qin E – 3rd Lao She Literary Prize for Prose
- Tongfei Sketch – 1st National Reportage Literary First Prize

== Personal life ==
Xiao's son, Xiao Tie (Chinese: 肖铁), is a member of China Writers Association, who was a Peking University student, studying in the United States.
