= Nalan Xingde =

Manchu poet in Qing China (1655–1685)

Nalan Xingde 納蘭性德
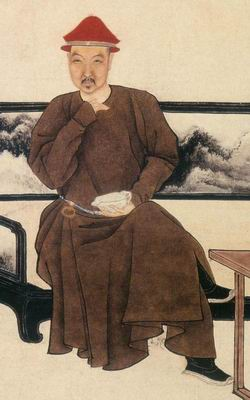
- Yu Zhiding's portrait of Nalan Xingde
- Born: Nalan Chengde (納蘭成德); January 19, 1655
- Died: July 1, 1685 (aged 30); Beijing, China
- Education: Chin-shih Degree
- Occupations: Poet, Imperial Guard
- Spouse(s): Lu (盧氏; c. 1674~1677); Yan (顏氏; concubine); Guan (官氏); Shen Wan (沈宛, concubine)
- Children: 3 sons and several daughters
- Relatives: Mingju (father)
- Writing career
- Pen name: 楞伽山人
- Language: Mandarin Chinese, Manchu language
- Period: Early Qing dynasty
- Genre: ci poetry
- Notable work: Drinking Water poem (飲水詞)

Nalan Xingde (simplified Chinese: 纳兰性德; traditional Chinese: 納蘭性德; Wade–Giles: Na-lan Hsing-te; January 19, 1655 – July 1, 1685), Manchu name Nara Singde, courtesy name Rongruo (容若), was a Chinese poet in Qing dynasty, famous for his ci poetry. He was born Nalan Chengde (納蘭成德), but had to change his name when the Kangxi Emperor named Yunreng his crown prince. The character cheng (成) became taboo because it was phonetic part of Yunreng's birth name.

Born in Beijing in January 1655, Nalan Xingde came from a powerful Manchu family that not only belonged to the Plain Yellow Banner of the Eight Banners, but was also related to royalty. His father Mingju, who became Grand Secretary in 1677, was second cousin to the Shunzhi Emperor, and his mother was the fifth daughter of Ajige, Prince Ying of the First Rank, and thus first cousin to the Shunzhi Emperor. Xingde's genealogical origins could have been Mongolian, however, since his clan was originally a tribe of the Mongol Yehe who defeated the Manchu Nara tribe and adopted their name.

He was reportedly a bright child with a talent in writing poetry and essays. Like all Manchu boys, however, he was also taught riding and archery, and was said to be quite proficient in both.

By nineteen, he was already enjoying a literary reputation. However, success at the national civil service examination eluded him until 1676, when he obtained the Chin-shih Degree. In contrast to the more common practice of naming a chin-shih a bureaucrat/official, the Kangxi Emperor gave Xingde a military position as a junior grade officer in the Imperial Bodyguard (三等侍衛).

Xingde became a close associate of the emperor, perhaps due to their similar ages, and often accompanied the emperor on royal tours of inspection. Later, Xingde was promoted to a higher position (一等侍衛). He was sent on a tour of the northern border to assess the damage caused by the Russian border raids and skirmishes.

He died at the age of 30, due to an unspecified illness.

When he was 19, he married the daughter of Lu Xingzu (盧興祖), who was the Viceroy of Guangdong. Three years into the marriage, his wife died in childbirth. He later took a concubine whose family name was Yan (顏) and eventually married a woman whose family name was Guan (官). At thirty, he took another concubine, Shen Wan (沈宛), who was a poet of some standing herself. He had at least three sons and several daughters.

One of the daughters of Nalan Xingde was married to Han Bannerman Nian Gengyao.

== Character ==
Nalan was born with great talent in literature. Though his supernormal background paved the way for his political career, it also controlled his freedom. So in Nalan's mind, he was tired of his position, and freedom was the pursuit of his life. Coming from a rich family, Nalan did not value the material comforts, and literature was his favorite. His dear wife's death made him feel pained and pessimistic, and intensified his eagerness to get close to nature.

== In fiction and popular culture ==
- Portrayed by Benny Chan in Yan Hua San Yue (2005)
- Portrayed by Stephen Wong Ka-lok in The Life and Times of a Sentinel (2011)
- Portrayed by Vin Zhang in Chronicle of Life (2016) as Nalan Rongruo, whose character is inspired by the persona Nalan Xingde.
- Portrayed by Zhao Dong Hao in The Flowers Filled the Palace and Missed the Time (2017)
