= Hoifa Nara =

Manchu clan and family name

Manchu name
- Manchu script: ᡥᠣᡳ᠌ᡶᠠ ᠨᠠᡵᠠ
- Möllendorff: hoifa nara

Chinese name
- Chinese: 辉发那拉氏
Transcriptions
Standard Mandarin
- Hanyu Pinyin: huī fā nà lā shì

Pronunciation respelling name
- Pronunciation respelling: HOY-fah-NAH-rah

Hoifa Nara is a one of the four major branches of the Nara clan and among the eight greatest Manchu families in some of the historical records during Qing dynasty. It was also the ruling clan of the Hoifa tribal nation (輝發國, -1607). Its ancestor, Angguli, originally belonged to the Ikderi clan of the Nimaca tribe in the Heilongjiang region. After migrating south, he adopted the surname Nara through association with local Nara families. By the late Ming period, the clan established the tribal nation in the Hoifa River basin under the leadership of Wangginu (王機褚). After the defeat of his grandson Baindari (拜音達禮) by Nurhaci, the clan and its followers were incorporated into the Eight Banners.

== Overview ==
During the Qing dynasty, the most distinguished branch was that of the Empress Nara of the Qianlong Emperor, whose father Narbū was posthumously granted the title of a first-rank duke due to his daughter's elevation. Following the empress's fall from favor, however, the family lost its hereditary banner command and declined. Apart from this branch, several members of the clan held hereditary titles such as qingcheduwei (輕車都尉, Light Chariot Commandant) and Qiduwei (騎都尉, Knight Commandant). After the fall of the Qing dynasty, descendants of the Hoifa Nara generally adopted the Sino surnames Zhang (張), Shi (施), Su (蘇), and You (游).

The descendants of the Hoifa beile family were mainly distributed among the Bordered Red Banner, Bordered Blue Banner, and Imperial Household Bordered Yellow Banner (內務府鑲黃旗). Tunggui (通貴), a grandson of Wangginu, surrendered to Nurhaci and was granted the hereditary rank of Qiduwei and Banner company commander (niru janggin). His descendants and clansmen produced numerous military and civil officials, including Banner-level commanders and company commanders. Mangko (莽科), another grandson of Wangginu, his great-grandson Narbu (納爾布) was the father of the Qianlong Emperor's Step Empress Nara.

Besides the ruling clan, several unrelated Hoifa Nara families also attained hereditary ranks through military service. Notable among them were the descendants of Sandan, who obtained multiple hereditary titles such as Qingcheduwei and Qiduwei. Another example, Šose Uba, who was granted Qiduwei due to his refusal to surrender while held captive by the Chahar Mongols for three years. After escaping, he served as superintendent of the imperial mausoleums (陵寢總管).
