= Yehe, Hebei =

Coordinates: 37°56′30″N 114°35′34″E

Yehe (town) 冶河镇
- Town

Chinese transcription(s)
- Interactive map of Yehe (town)
- Country: China
- Province: Hebei
- Prefecture: Shijiazhuang
- District: Luancheng
- Time zone: UTC+8 (China Standard Time)

Yehe (Chinese: 冶河镇) is a town and township-level division of Luancheng District, Shijiazhuang, Hebei, China.

== See also ==
- List of township-level divisions of Hebei
