= Hūlun =

Jurchen tribal confederacy

Hūlun gurun (Manchu: ᡥᡡᠯᡠᠨ
ᡤᡠᡵᡠᠨᡳ, simplified Chinese: 扈伦国; traditional Chinese: 扈倫國; pinyin: hùlúnguó) was a powerful confederacy of Haixi Jurchen tribes in the late 16th century, based primarily in modern Jilin province of China.

The Hūlun confederacy was formed by Hada-nara Wang-tai (d. 1582), the leader of the Hada tribe, which had drawn its importance from the control of commerce between the late-Ming Liaodong and Jurchen tribes to the east via Guangshun Pass (east of Kaiyuan, which is located near the northern tip of today's Liaoning Province). Besides the Hada themselves, the Hūlun included three other tribal federations, known as Ula, Yehe, and Hoifa.

While the Hūlun people were mostly of Jurchen origin, they had been heavily influenced by the Mongol language and culture, and intermarried with the neighboring Khorchin and Kharchin Mongols. Therefore, were viewed by their southern neighbors – Jianzhou Jurchens, which were in the late 16th century led by Nurhaci – as Monggo ("Mongols").

The Hūlun khan Wang-tai aspired to paramount leadership in the region, establishing a network of political and business relations with Jurchen and Mongol leaders, as well as with the Ming governor of Liaodong, Li Chengliang.

Nurhaci, the chief of the Jianzhou Jurchens, was Wang-tai's son-in-law, (Note: Jurchen and Mongol chieftains of the time were often polygamous, thus it would be common for each of them to be a son-in-law, and later in life father-in-law, of many other chiefs; see many allusions to such relations elsewhere in Crossley (2006).) and, in Pamela Crossley's view, viewed Wang-tai and his Hūlun as role models for himself and his Later Jin dynasty in northeastern China. Many years later, long after Hong Taiji had renamed Jurchens to Manchus, and both Wang-tai and Nurhaci were dead, Qing historians referred to Wang-tai as one of the first great leaders of the "Manchu nations".

In the closing years of the 16th century, Hūlun tribes started recognizing Nurhaci's supremacy although, in some cases, the Nurhaci-appointed chief of a tribe would then try to assert his independence, and a new war would result, as it was the case with Bujantai, the leader of the Ula. Eventually, all four tribes were fully incorporated into Nurhaci's empire (Hada 1601, Hoifa 1607, Ula 1613, Yehe 1619).
