= Empress Xiaocigao (Qing dynasty) =

Empress of the Qing dynasty (1575–1603)

- Empress of the Qing dynasty (posthumously)
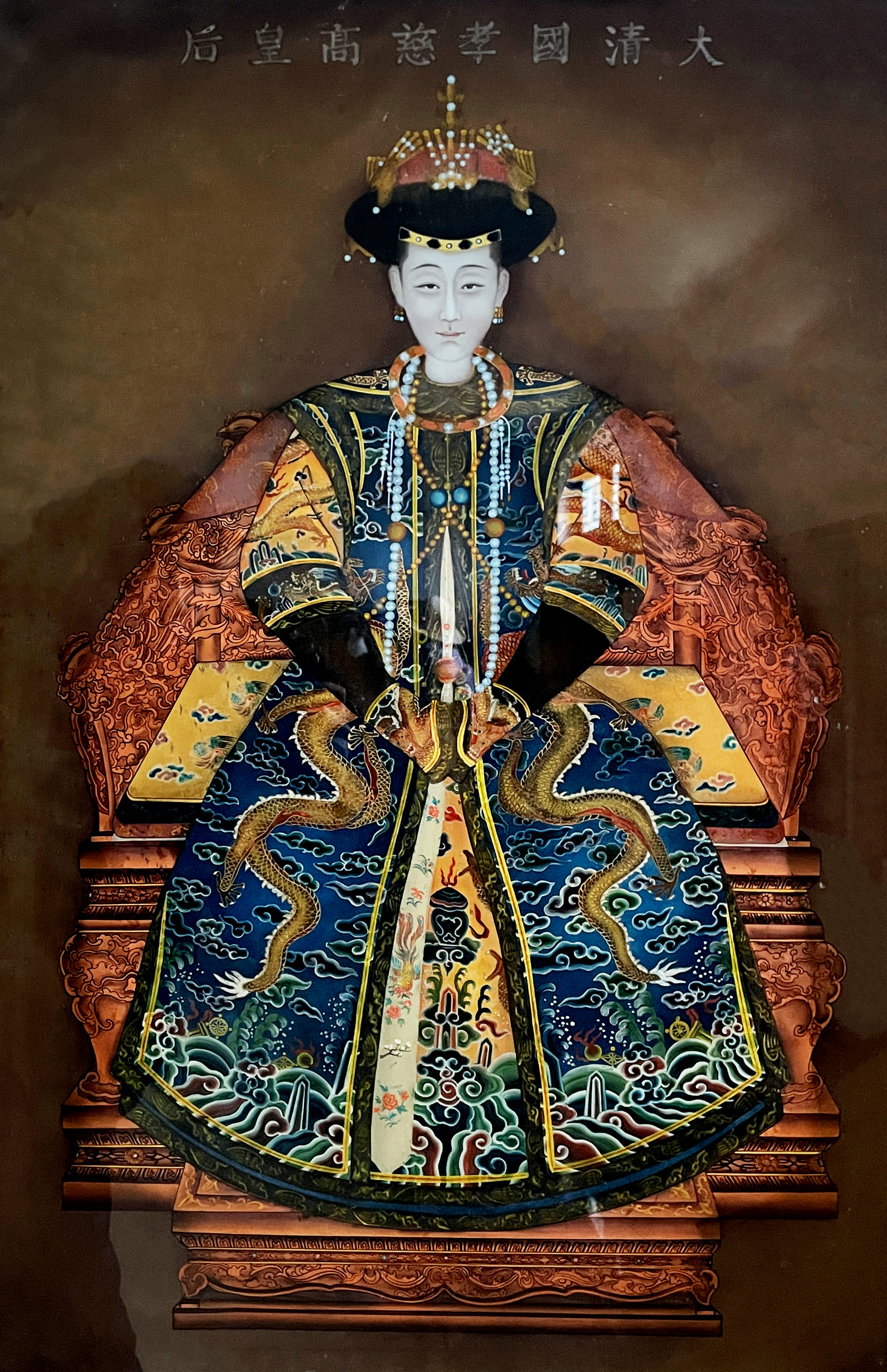
- Anachronistic state portrait, at the Eastern Qing Tombs Museum
- Born: 1575
- Died: 31 October 1603 (aged 27–28)
- Burial: Fu Mausoleum
- Spouse: Nurhaci (m. 1588)
- Issue Detail: Hong Taiji
Names
- Monggo Jerjer (孟古哲哲)
Posthumous name
- Empress Xiaoci Zhaoxian Jingshun Renhui Yide Qingxian Chengtian Fusheng Gao (孝慈昭憲敬順仁徽懿德慶顯承天輔聖高皇后)
- House: Yehe-Nara (by birth); Aisin-Gioro (by marriage)
- Father: Yangginu

Chinese name
- Traditional Chinese: 孝慈高皇后
- Simplified Chinese: 孝慈高皇后
Transcriptions
Standard Mandarin
- Hanyu Pinyin: Xiàocígāo Huánghòu

Manchu name
- Manchu script: ᡥᡳᠶᠣᠣᡧᡠᠩᡤᠠ ᡤᠣᠰᡳᠨ ᡩᡝᡵᡤᡳ ᡥᡡᠸᠠᠩᡥᡝᠣ
- Romanization: hiyoošungga gosin dergi hūwangheo

Empress Xiaocigao (1575 – 31 October 1603), of the Yehe-Nara clan, personal name Monggo Jerjer, was a wife of Nurhaci.

== Life ==
=== Family background ===
- Father: Yangginu (楊吉努; d. 1583); held the title of beile (貝勒)
  - Grandfather: Taicu (台杵); held the title of beile (貝勒)
  - Uncle: Cinggiyanu (清佳砮; d. 1583); held the title of beile (貝勒)
- Two elder brothers
  - First elder brother: Narimbulu (納林布祿; d. 1609); held the title of beile (貝勒)
  - Second elder brother: Gintaisi (d. 1619); held the title of beile (貝勒)

=== Wanli era ===
In October or November 1588, Monggo Jerjer married Nurhaci, becoming one of his many wives. On 28 November 1592, she gave birth to Nurhaci's eighth son, Hong Taiji. She died on 31 October 1603.

=== Chongde era ===
After Hong Taiji proclaimed the Qing dynasty in 1636, he posthumously honored his mother as "Empress Xiaociwu".

=== Kangxi era ===
In 1662, Monggo Jerjer's posthumous name was changed from "Empress Xiaociwu" to "Empress Xiaocigao", reflecting her status as a wife of Nurhaci (Emperor Gao).

== Titles ==
- During the reign of the Wanli Emperor (r. 1572–1620):
  - Lady Yehe-Nara (葉赫那拉氏)
  - Consort (福晉; from October/November 1588) (Note: The Jurchens had multiple wives with very little distinction between them, all being addressed by this general term. This was also the case for Nurhaci's wives. It was in later compilations of documents that the women were attributed new titles to differentiate them.)
  - Great Consort of the Central Chamber (中室大福晉; from unknown date)
- During the reign of Hong Taiji (r. 1626–1643):
  - Empress Xiaociwu (孝慈武皇后; from 1636)
- During the reign of the Kangxi Emperor (r. 1661–1722):
  - Empress Xiaocigao (孝慈高皇后; from 1662)

== Issue ==
- Hong Taiji (皇太極; 28 November 1592 – 21 September 1643), Nurhaci's eighth son; enthroned on 20 October 1626

== In popular culture ==
- Portrayed by Mak Tsui-han in The Rise and Fall of Qing Dynasty (1987)
- Portrayed by Shi Xiaoqun in Taizu Mishi (2005)

== See also ==
- Imperial Chinese harem system § Qing
- Imperial and noble ranks of the Qing dynasty
