= Nara clan =

Manchu clan and family name

Manchu name
- Manchu script: ᠨᠠᡵᠠ
- Möllendorff: nara

Chinese name
- Chinese: 那拉氏 / 纳兰氏
Transcriptions
Standard Mandarin
- Hanyu Pinyin: nà lā shì / nà lán shì

Pronunciation respelling name
- Pronunciation respelling: NAH-rah

Nara is one of the eight prominent Manchu clans (著姓) listed in the General Genealogy of the Eight Banners Manchu Clans (八旗滿洲氏族通譜). It is also the surname of the ruling families of the four Hūlun tribal nations — Yehe, Ula, Hada, and Hoifa — during the late Ming period. The clan was also distributed across many regions of Manchuria and gradually conquered and incorporated into the Eight Banners by Nurhaci. During the Qing dynasty, the Nara clan produced numerous nobles, officials, generals, and imperial consorts, most notably Empress Dowager Cixi, who dominated Qing politics for more than forty years. After the fall of Qing, descendants commonly adopted the Chinese surnames Na (那), Ye (葉), Bai (白), Nan (南), and others.

== Overview ==
The Nara clan is one of the oldest Jurchen-Manchu surnames, tracing its origins to the clan known as Nalan (納蘭) in Chinese. It was recorded among the “Thirty Common Jurchen Surnames” (女真通用三十姓) of the late Tang period and utilized though the Jurchen Jin dynasty. By the late Ming period, the clan had developed into four major branches—Yehe Nara, Ula Nara, Hada Nara, and Hoifa Nara—although many other branches existed and most were not closely related.

The clan showed exceptional prominence during the Qing era. Its uncountable members included high-ranking nobles, the Grand Secretary Mingju, and numerous imperial consorts, among them Empress Xiaocigao, Empress Xiaojingxian, the Qianlong Emperor's Step Empress, and Empress Dowager Cixi. Several branches held hereditary noble titles and military ranks.

Besides the four ruling lineages, other notable families included the Bacilan (巴奇蘭) family of Ibadan, clansmen of the Hoifa Nara beile family, whose descendants held hereditary titles and senior official posts, and various banner families from Jang (張), Jilin Ula, Changbai Mountain, and other regions. Throughout the Qing dynasty, members of the Nara clan served as ministers, governors, military commanders, and banner officials, making it one of the most distinguished Manchu surnames.
