= Expressways of Henan =

Expressway network in Henan Province of China

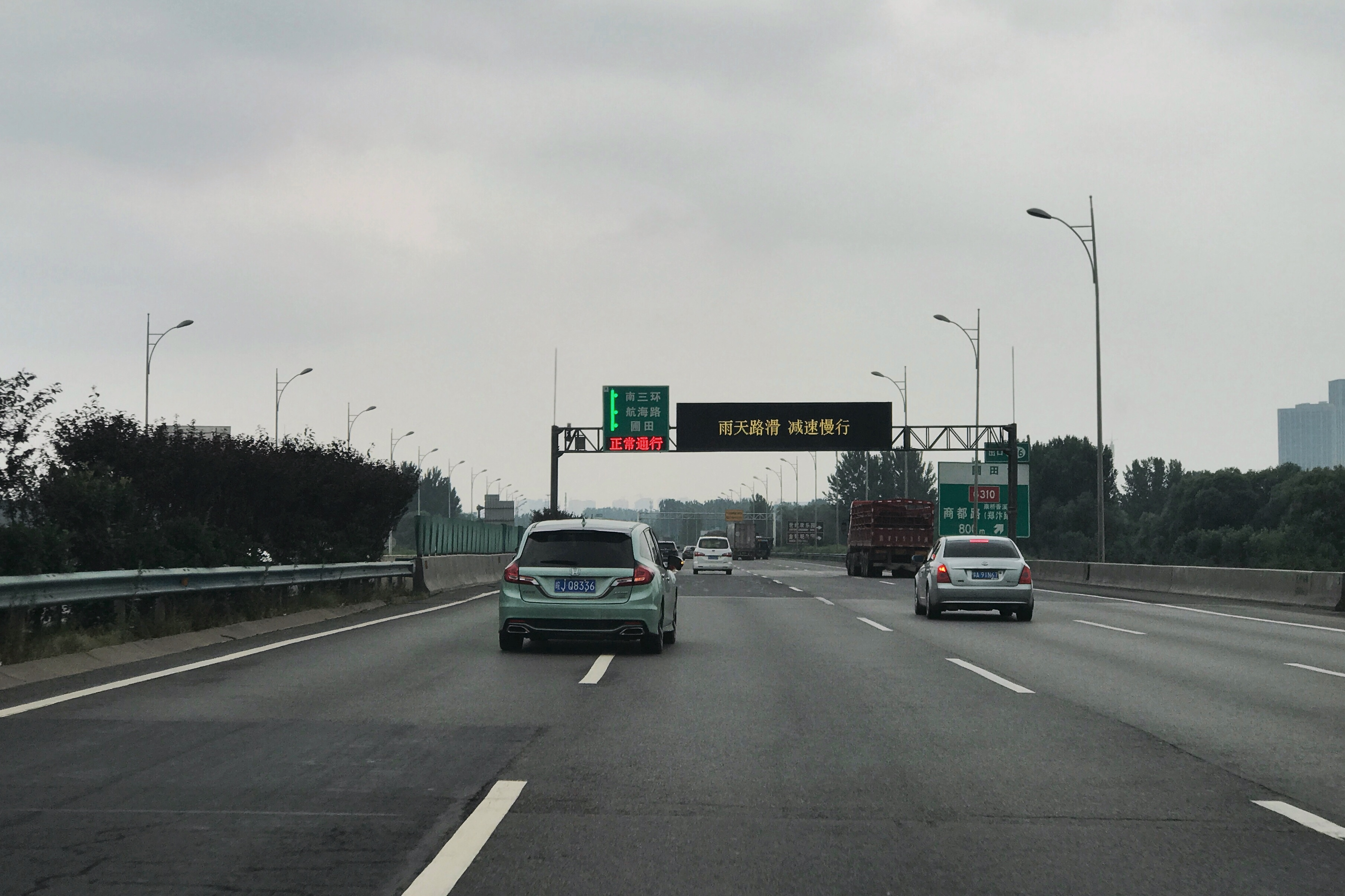
G4 Expressway in Zhengzhou

Henan, a Chinese province on the central plain area, has an expansive network consisting of national-level and provincial level expressways. As of 2025, the province had 10,088 km (6,268 mi) of expressways. All of the counties in Henan has expressway connections.

== Numbering ==
The national-level expressways are numbered with a letter prefix G, which is short for "guojia" in Chinese meaning "national". For provincial-level expressways, a letter prefix S, which is short for "shengji" (province level). The numbering of provincial-level expressways in Henan follows the rules below:

- For radial expressways leaving Zhengzhou (the province capital), use a number in 81–90. (except for S1)
- For north–south expressways, use an odd number in 11–59. (in ascending order from east to west, except for S81)
- For east–west expressways, use an even number in 10–60. (in ascending order from north to south, except for S72 and S82)
- For connection or parallel routes, use a number in 61–80, 91–99, except for S38 and S84
- The numerical sequence number of the provincial expressway does not overlap with the numerical sequence number of the national expressway within the province.

On July 8, 2024, the latest version of Henan Expressway numbering was released by Henan Provincial Department of Transportation.

== List of routes ==
=== National-level expressways ===
Name and number	Abbreviated name	Name in simplified Chinese	Termini in Henan		Length (Henan section)	Status	Note
G4 (Beijing–Hong Kong and Macau Expressway)	Jinggang'ao Expressway	京港澳高速	Anyang (Hebei border)	Lingshan, Xinyang (Hubei border)	522.94 km (324.94 mi)	Fully completed	
G30 (Lianyungang–Khorgas Expressway)	Lianhuo Expressway	连霍高速	Mangshan, Shangqiu (Anhui border)	Lingbao (Shaanxi border)	609.96 km (379.01 mi)	Fully completed	
G35 (Jinan–Guangzhou Expressway)	Jiguang Expressway	济广高速	Shangqiu (Shandong border)	Mulan, Shangqiu (Anhui border)	57.45 km (35.70 mi)	Fully completed	
G36 (Nanjing–Luoyang Expressway)	Ningluo Expressway	宁洛高速	Shenqiu, Zhoukou (Anhui border)	G30 in Luoyang	367.13 km (228.12 mi)	Fully completed	
G40 (Shanghai–Xi'an Expressway)	Hushan Expressway	沪陕高速	Chenlinzi, Gushi, Xinyang (Anhui border)	Xiping, Xixia, Nanyang (Shaanxi border)	518.8 km (322.4 mi)	Fully completed	
G45 (Daqing–Guangzhou Expressway)	Daguang Expressway	大广高速	Nanle, Puyang (Hebei border)	Xinxian, Xinyang (Hubei border)	558.1 km (346.8 mi)	Fully completed	
G55 (Erenhot–Guangzhou Expressway)	Erguang Expressway	二广高速	Jiyuan (Shanxi border)	Goulin, Dengzhou (Hubei border)	371.7 km (231.0 mi)	Fully completed	
G59 (Hohhot–Beihai Expressway)	Hubei Expressway	呼北高速	Yunbao Yellow River Bridge (Shanxi border)	Siwan, Xichuan, Nanyang (Hubei border)	207.8 km (129.1 mi)	Fully completed	
G0321 (Dezhou–Shangrao Expressway)	Deshang Expressway	德上高速	Yancunpu Township, Fan County, Puyang / Tiaohe Town, Yongcheng, Shangqiu	Chenzhuang Town, Fan County, Puyang / Houling Subdistrict, Yongcheng, Shangqiu	59.91 km (37.23 mi)	Fully completed	
G0411 (Anyang–Changzhi Expressway)	Anchang Expressway	安长高速	G4 in Anyang	Linzhou, Anyang (Shanxi border)	87 km (54 mi)	Fully completed	
G0421 (Xuchang–Guangzhou Expressway)	Xuguang Expressway	许广高速	G4 in Xuchang	Tongbai, Nanyang (Hubei border)	213 km (132 mi)	Fully completed	
G0424 (Beijing–Wuhan Expressway)	Jingwu Expressway	京武高速	Neihuang, Anyang (Hebei border)	Luoshan, Xinyang (Hubei border)	624.11 km (387.80 mi)	Beiguo, Anyang County, Anyang - G40 section completed, other sections under construction	
G0513 (Pingyao–Luoyang Expressway)	Pingluo Expressway	平洛高速	Jiyuan (Shanxi border)	G30 / G36 in Luoyang	61.99 km (38.52 mi)	Fully completed	
G1511 (Rizhao–Lankao Expressway)	Rilan Expressway	日兰高速	Shandong border	G30 / Henan S37 (S37) in Lankao, Kaifeng	43.08 km (26.77 mi)	Fully completed	
G1516 (Yancheng–Luoyang Expressway)	Yanluo Expressway	盐洛高速	Luyi, Zhoukou (Anhui border)	G55 / G36 in Luoyang	296.78 km (184.41 mi)	Fully completed	
G3001 (Zhengzhou Ring Expressway)		郑州绕城高速	G30	G4	106 km (66 mi)	Fully completed	Ring expressway
G3031 (Shangqiu–Gushi Expressway)	Shanggu Expressway	商固高速	G30 / Henan S21 (S21) in Ningling / Huaibin, Xinyang (Anhui border)	Liufu Town, Shenqiu, Zhoukou (Anhui border) / G40 in Gushi	About 250 km (160 mi)	Fully completed	
G3511 (Heze–Baoji Expressway)	Hebao Expressway	菏宝高速	Changyuan, Xinxiang (Shandong border)	Jiyuan (Shanxi border)	320.57 km (199.19 mi)	Fully completed	
G3611 (Nanjing–Xinyang Expressway)	Ningxin Expressway	宁信高速	Huaibin, Xinyang (Anhui border)	G40 in Xingji Town, Xinyang	158 km (98 mi)	Fully completed	
G3612 (Pingdingshan–Yichang Expressway)	Pingyi Expressway	平宜高速	G36 in Ye County, Pingdingshan	Xinye, Nanyang (Hubei border)	About 190 km (120 mi)	G36 - G40 section completed, other sections in planning	
G3613 (Luoyang–Neixiang Expressway)	Luonei Expressway	洛内高速	Luoyang	G40 / Henan S98 (S98) in Neixiang, Nanyang	TBD	Luoyang - Henan S42 (S42) / Henan S96 (S96) section completed, other sections in planning	
G3615 (Luoyang–Lushi Expressway)	Luolu Expressway	洛卢高速	Luoyang	G59 in Lushi, Sanmenxia	137.03 km (85.15 mi)	Fully completed	Connecting route of G36
G4222 (He County–Xiangyang Expressway)	Hexiang Expressway	和襄高速	Shangcheng, Xinyang (Anhui border)	Panjiatai, Shihe, Xinyang (Hubei border)	About 260 km (160 mi)	Anhui border - Dongjiahe Town, Xinyang section completed, other sections in planning	
G5512 (Jincheng–Xinxiang Expressway)	Jinxin Expressway	晋新高速	Jiaozuo (Shanxi border)	G4 / Henan S32 (S32) in Xinxiang	106 km (66 mi)	Fully completed	Parallel route of Henan S32 (S32)
G9905 (Zhengzhou Metropolitan Area Ring Expressway)		郑州都市圈环线高速	City ring expressway		308 km (191 mi)	Henan S60 (S60) / Henan S39 (S39) - G30 / Henan S39 (S39) section ( Henan S39 (S39) concurrency) under construction, other sections completed	Ring expressway

=== Provincial-level expressways ===
Name and number	Abbreviated name	Name in simplified Chinese	Termini		Length	Status	Note
Henan S1 (Zhengzhou Airport Expressway)	Airport Expressway	机场高速	Zhongzhou Avenue and Longhai Expressway interchange	G4 in Xinzheng	26.4 km (16.4 mi)	Fully completed	
Henan S21 (Puyang–Shangqiu Expressway)	Pushang Expressway	濮商高速	Nanle, Puyang (Shandong border / Minquan, Shangqiu (Shandong border)	Liyuan Township, Puyang County, Puyang (Shandong border) / G30 / G3031 in Ningling, Shangqiu	About 120 km (75 mi)	Shandong border - Henan S22 (S22) section in planning, other sections completed	
Henan S22 (Nanle–Anyang Expressway)	Nan'an Expressway	南安高速	Nanle, Puyang, (Shandong border)	G4 / G0411 in Anyang	98.4 km (61.1 mi)	Fully completed	
Henan S23 (Gushi–Shangcheng Expressway)	Gushang Expressway	固商高速	G40 / G3031 in Gushi, Xinyang	Shangcheng, Xinyang (Hubei border)	About 70 km (43 mi)	G40 / G3031 - G4222 section completed, other sections in planning	
Henan S25 (Anyang - Xinxiang Expressway)	Anxin Expressway	安新高速	Anyang County, Anyang (Hebei border)	G3511 in Xinxiang	About 120 km (75 mi)	Henan S64 (S64) - G0411 section ( Henan S71 (S71) concurrency) completed, G0411 - Henan S26 (S26) section under construction, other sections in planning	
Henan S26 (Taiqian–Huixian Expressway)	Taihui Expressway	台辉高速	Taiqian, Puyang (Shandong border)	Henan S84 (S84) in Huixian	225.75 km (140.27 mi)	Fully completed	
Henan S29 (Xuchang–Xinyang Expressway)	Xuxin Expressway	许信高速	G0421 / G1516 in Xuchang	Tanjiahe Township, Xinyang (Hubei border)	About 250 km (160 mi)	Fully completed	
Henan S32 (Alone the Yellow River Expressway)	Yanhuang Expressway	沿黄高速	Minquan, Shangqiu (Shandong border)	G55 / G3511 in Jiyuan	About 320 km (200 mi)	Henan S65 (S65) - G45 section under construction, other sections completed	
Henan S33 (Along the Taihang Mountain Expressway)	Yantaihang Expressway	沿太行高速	Linzhou, Anyang (Hebei border)	G0513 in Jiyuan	About 210 km (130 mi)	Baoquan, Huixian - G5512 section under construction, other sections completed	
Henan S37 (Lankao–Xuchang Expressway)	Lanxu Expressway	兰许高速	G30 / G1511 in Lankao, Kaifeng	G1516 in Xuchang	114 km (71 mi)	Fully completed	
Henan S38 (Xincai–Biyang Expressway)	Xinyang Expressway	新阳高速	Licheng, Xincai, Zhumadian (Anhui border)	G0421 in Biyang, Zhumadian	163.5 km (101.6 mi)	Fully completed	
Henan S39 (Jiaozuo - Xuchang Expressway)	Jiaoxu Expressway	焦许高速	G327 in Jiaozuo	G0421 / Henan S46 (S46) in Xiangcheng, Xuchang	176.588 km (109.727 mi)	under construction	
Henan S42 (Yongcheng–Lingbao Expressway)	Yongling Expressway	永灵高速	Yongcheng, Shangqiu (Anhui border)	Lingbao, Sanmenxia (Shaanxi border)	515 km (320 mi)	G3615 - G59 section ( G3615 concurrency) and Henan S37 (S37) - Henan S88 (S88) section completed, other sections in planning	
Henan S46 (Zhoukou - Pingdingshan Expressway)	Zhouping Expressway	周平高速	Dancheng, Zhoukou (Anhui border)	G36 in Baofeng, Pingdingshan	TBD	G4 - Henan S77 (S77) / Henan S39 (S39) section under construction, other sections in planning	
Henan S48 (Shenqiu - Lushi Expressway)	Shenlu Expressway	沈卢高速	Shenqiu, Zhoukou (Anhui border)	Lushi, Sanmenxia (Shaanxi border)	About 490 km (300 mi)	G3031 - G4 section completed, other sections in planning	
Henan S49 (Jiaozuo–Tanghe Expressway)	Jiaotang Expressway	焦唐高速	Henan S308 in Jiaozuo	Tanghe, Nanyang, (Hubei border)	376.05 km (233.67 mi)	Jiaozuo–Wen County section and G30 - Hubei border section completed, other sections in planning	
Henan S57 (Mianchi–Xichuan Expressway)	Mianxi Expressway	渑淅高速	Mianchi, Sanmenxia (Shanxi border)	Xichuan, Nanyang (Hubei border)	About 173 km (107 mi)	Luoning - Henan S96 (S96) section in planning, other sections completed	
Henan S60 (Shangqiu–Dengfeng Expressway)	Shangdeng Expressway	商登高速	G30 in Shangqiu	Henan S85 in Dengfeng	222 km (138 mi)	Fully completed	
Henan S61 (Yucheng–Yongcheng Expressway)	Yuyong Expressway	虞永高速	Yucheng, Shangqiu (Shandong border)	G1516 in Yongcheng, Shangqiu	About 80 km (50 mi)	In planning	Parallel route of G35
Henan S63 (Shangcai–Xin County Expressway)	Shangxin Expressway	上新高速	G0424 in Shangcai, Zhumadian	Xin County, Xinyang (Hubei border	TBD	In planning	Parallel route of G0424
Henan S64 (Neihuang–Linzhou Expressway)	Neilin Expressway	内林高速	G0424 in Neihuang, Anyang	Henan S33 (S33) in Linzhou, Anyang	About 90 km (56 mi)	G4 - Henan S25 (S25) section ( Henan S71 (S71) concurrency) completed, other sections in planning	Parallel route of Henan S22 (S22); G0411
Henan S65 (Lankao - Shenqiu Expressway)	Lanshen Expressway	兰沈高速	Lankao, Kaifeng (Shandong border)	Henan S48 (S48) in Shenqiu, Zhoukou	About 200 km (120 mi)	G1511 - G1516 section completed, other sections in planning	Parallel route of G45
Henan S66 (Neihuang - Hebi Expressway)	Neihe Expressway	内鹤高速	G0424 in Neihuang, Anyang	Henan S25 (S25) in Hebi	About 55 km (34 mi)	In planning	Parallel route of Henan S26 (S26)
Henan S67 (Qi County - Yanjin Expressway)	Qiyan Expressway	淇延高速	G4 in Qi County, Hebi	G0424 in Yanjin, Xinxiang	About 40 km (25 mi)	In planning	Parallel route of G4
Henan S68 (Changyuan - Xiuwu Expressway)	Changxiu Expressway	长修高速	Changyuan, Xinxiang (Shandong border)	Xiuwu, Jiaozuo	128.8 km (80.0 mi)	Fengqiu - Xiuwu section completed, other sections in planning	Parallel route of G3511
Henan S69 (Weishi - Linying Expressway)	Weilin Expressway	尉临高速	G0424 in Weishi, Kaifeng	G4 in Linying, Luohe	About 80 km (50 mi)	In planning	Parallel route of G4
Henan S70 (Shenqiu - Wuyang Expressway)	Shenwu Expressway	沈舞高速	G3031 in Shenqiu, Zhoukou	Henan S29 (S29) in Wuyang, Luohe	About 130 km (81 mi)	In planning	Parallel route of G36
Henan S71 (Anyang Ring Expressway)		安阳绕城高速	G4	G0411	27.153 km (16.872 mi)	Fully completed	Ring expressway
Henan S72 (Puyang–Huixian Expressway)	Puhui Expressway	濮辉高速	Puyang County, Puyang	Henan S84 (S84) / Henan S33 (S33) in Huixian, Xinxiang	About 140 km (87 mi)	Puyang County - Weihui section completed, other sections in planning	
Henan S73 (Nanyang - Dengzhou Expressway)	Nandeng Expressway	南邓高速	G40 / G55 in Zhenping, Nanyang	Dengzhou, Nanyang (Hubei border)	About 80 km (50 mi)	Fully completed	Connecting route of G40
Henan S74 (Lingbao Ring Expressway)		灵宝绕城高速	Shanxi border	G59	About 33 km (21 mi)	G30 - G59 section completed, other sections in planning	Ring expressway
Henan S75 (Sanmenxia–Luoning Expressway)	Sanluo Expressway	三洛高速	Sanmenxia Yellow River Expressway-Railway Dual purpose Bridge (Shanxi border)	G3615 in Luoning, Luoyang	About 140 km (87 mi)	Shanxi border - G30 section completed, other sections in planning	Parellel route of G59
Henan S76 (Luanchuan–Lushi Expressway)	Luanlu Expressway	栾卢高速	Henan S57 (S57) in Luanchuan, Luoyang	Lushi, Sanmenxia (Shaanxi border)	75.3 km (46.8 mi)	Fully completed	Connecting route of Henan S57 (S57)
Henan S77 (Zhengzhou - Nanyang Expressway)	Zhengnan Expressway	郑南高速	G3001 in Zhengzhou	Henan S81 (S81) in Nanyang	About 240 km (150 mi)	G3001 - G1516 section under construction, other sections in planning	Parallel route of G1511 Henan S37 (S37) G3612
Henan S78 (Xincai - Queshan Expressway)	Xinque Expressway	新确高速	Xincai, Zhumadian (Anhui border)	Henan S29 (S29) in Queshan, Zhumadian	About 105 km (65 mi)	In planning	Parallel route of G3611
Henan S79 (Ye County - Lushan Expressway)	Yelu Expressway	叶鲁高速	G36 in Ye County, Pingdingshan	Henan S88 (S88) in Lushan, Pingdingshan	About 67.5 km (41.9 mi)	In construction	Parallel route of G36
Henan S80 (Along the Huai River Expressway)	Yanhuai Expressway	沿淮高速	Gushi, Xinyang (Anhui border)	G55 / Henan S98 (S98)in Xingji, Xinyang	About 220 km (140 mi)	Anhui border - G3031 section completed, others sections in planning	Parallel route of G40
Henan S81 (Shangqiu–Nanyang Expressway)	Shangnan Expressway	商南高速	G35 in Shangqiu	G55 in Nanyang	342.2 km (212.6 mi)	Fully completed	
Henan S82 (Zhengzhou–Shangqiu Expressway)	Zhengshang Expressway	郑商高速	G4 / G3001 in Zhongmu, Zhengzhou	Yucheng, Shangqiu (Anhui border)	About 230 km (140 mi)	G4 / G3001 - G30 section completed, other sections in planning	
Henan S83 (Zhengzhou - Luoyang Expressway)	Zhengluo Expressway	郑洛高速	G3001 in Zhengzhou	G55 in Luoyang	94.939 km (58.992 mi)	under construction	
Henan S84 (Zhengzhou–Huixian Expressway)	Zhenghui Expressway	郑辉高速	G30 in Zhengzhou	Huixian, Xinxiang (Shanxi border)	About 130 km (81 mi)	G3511 - Shanxi border section completed, other sections in planning	Parallel route of Henan S25 (S25) Henan S29 (S29)
Henan S85 (Zhengzhou–Shaolinsi Expressway)	Zhengshao Expressway	郑少高速	West 4th Ring Road in Zhengzhou	G1516 / Henan S49 (S49) in Dengfeng	53.3 km (33.1 mi)	Fully completed	
Henan S86 (Zhengzhou–Jiaozuo Expressway)	Zhengjiao Expressway	郑焦高速	G30 in Xingyang, Zhengzhou	Xiuwu, Jiaozuo (Shanxi border)	About 70 km (43 mi)	In planning	
Henan S87 (Zhengzhou–Yuntaishan Expressway)	Zhengyun Expressway	郑云高速	G30 / G3001 in Xingyang, Zhengzhou	Yuntai Mountain Scenic Area, Xiuwu, Jiaozuo	65.5 km (40.7 mi)	Fully completed	
Henan S88 (Zhengzhou–Luanchuan Expressway)	Zhengluan Expressway	郑栾高速	Zhengzhou	Henan S57 (S57) in Luanchuan, Luoyang	276.87 km (172.04 mi)	Fully completed	
Henan S89 (Zhengzhou–Xinxiang Expressway)	Zhengxin Expressway	郑新高速	G30 in Zhengzhou	G5512 in Yuanyang, Xinxiang	About 18 km (11 mi)	In planning	
Henan S95 (Qinyang - Yichuan Expressway)	Qinyi Expressway	沁伊高速	Henan S33 (S33) in Qinyang, Jiaozuo	G36 / G55 / Henan S97 (S97) in Yichuan, Luoyang	About 115 km (71 mi)	G3511 - G36 / G55 / Henan S97 (S97) section completed, other sections in planning	Parallel route of G55
Henan S96 (Song County–Luanchuan Expressway)	Songluan Expressway	嵩栾高速	Henan S42 (S42) / G3613 in Song County, Luoyang	Henan S57 (S57) in Tantou Town, Luanchuan	About 40 km (25 mi)	Fully completed	Connecting route of Henan S42 (S42)
Henan S97 (Jiyuan–Yichuan Expressway)	Jiyi Expressway	济伊高速	G3511 in Jiyuan	G55 Yichuan, Luoyang	129.74 km (80.62 mi)	Fully completed	Connecting route of G55
Henan S98 (Neixiang–Dengzhou Expressway)	Neideng Expressway	内邓高速	G40 in Neixiang, Nanyang	G55 in Dengzhou, Nanyang	90.7 km (56.4 mi)	Fully completed	Connecting route of G40
