= S22 Nanle–Anyang Expressway =

Road in Henan, China

Nanle–Linzhou Expressway
- Nan'an Expressway 南安高速公路

Route information
- Length: 98.4 km (61.1 mi)
- Existed: 2015–present

Major junctions
- East end: Henan-Shandong border near Fukan Town, Nanle County, Puyang
- Henan S21 (S21) (under construction) in Nanle, Puyang; G45 in Nanle, Puyang; G0424 in Anyang County, Anyang (under construction)
- West end: G4 in Anyang

Location
- Country: China
- Province: Henan

Highway system
- Transport in China

The Nanle–Anyang Expressway (Chinese: 南乐－安阳高速公路), abbreviated as Nan'an Expressway (Chinese: 南安高速) and designated as S22 in Henan's expressway system, is 98.4-kilometre (61.1 mi) long regional expressway in the northern part of Henan, China.

== History ==
This expressway started construction on 28 June 2012, and was open to traffic on 16 November 2015 in the name of S22 Nanle–Linzhou Expressway (Chinese: 南乐－林州高速公路) or Nanlin Expressway (Chinese: 南林高速) (Shandong border-Nanle section). The S22 Nanle–Linzhou Expressway itself was opened on 5 December 2008 (Anyang-Linzhou section). The expressway was fully completed on 28 September 2018.

On July 8, 2024, the latest version of Henan Expressway numbering was released by Henan Provincial Department of Transportation. The previous Henan S22 (Nanle–Linzhou Expressway) was abolished. Instead, the Anyang-Linzhou(Shanxi border) section was redesignated as G0411, and the Nanle(Shandong border)-Anyang section was renamed as Nan'an Expressway.

== Exit list ==
From east to west:

Location	km	mi	Exit	Name	Destinations	Notes
Henan S22 (Nanle–Anyang Expressway)
Continues east towards Shen County as Shandong S28 (S28)
Nanle, Puyang				(nameless interchange)	Henan S21 (S21) – Shangqiu	Under construction
Nanle, Puyang				Nanle East	Henan S209 / Henan S214 – Hanzhang, Qiankou	
Nanle, Puyang	Nanle Service Area					
Nanle, Puyang				Nanle South	G106 – Nanle	
Nanle, Puyang				Daguang Expressway Interchange	G45 – Daqing, Puyang, Guangzhou	
Neihuang, Anyang	Neihuang North Parking Area					
Neihuang, Anyang				Neihuang	G230 (Diku Avanue) – Neihuang	
Anyang County, Anyang				Xincun Interchange	G0424 – Beijing, Wuhan	Under construction
Anyang County, Anyang	Anyang East Service Area					
Anyang County, Anyang				Anyang East	G515 – Wadian	
Anyang County, Anyang	Jiangtai Parking Area					
Wenfeng District, Anyang				Jinggang'ao & Nanlin Expressway Interchange	G4 – Beijing, Shijiazhuang, Zhengzhou; G0411 – Linzhou, Changzhi; Anyang urban area	
Continues west towards Linzhou as G0411
Closed/former; Concurrency terminus; HOV only; Incomplete access; Tolled; Route transition; Unopened
