= S22 Nanle–Linzhou Expressway =

Road in Henan, China

Nanle–Linzhou Expressway
- Nanlin Expressway 南林高速公路
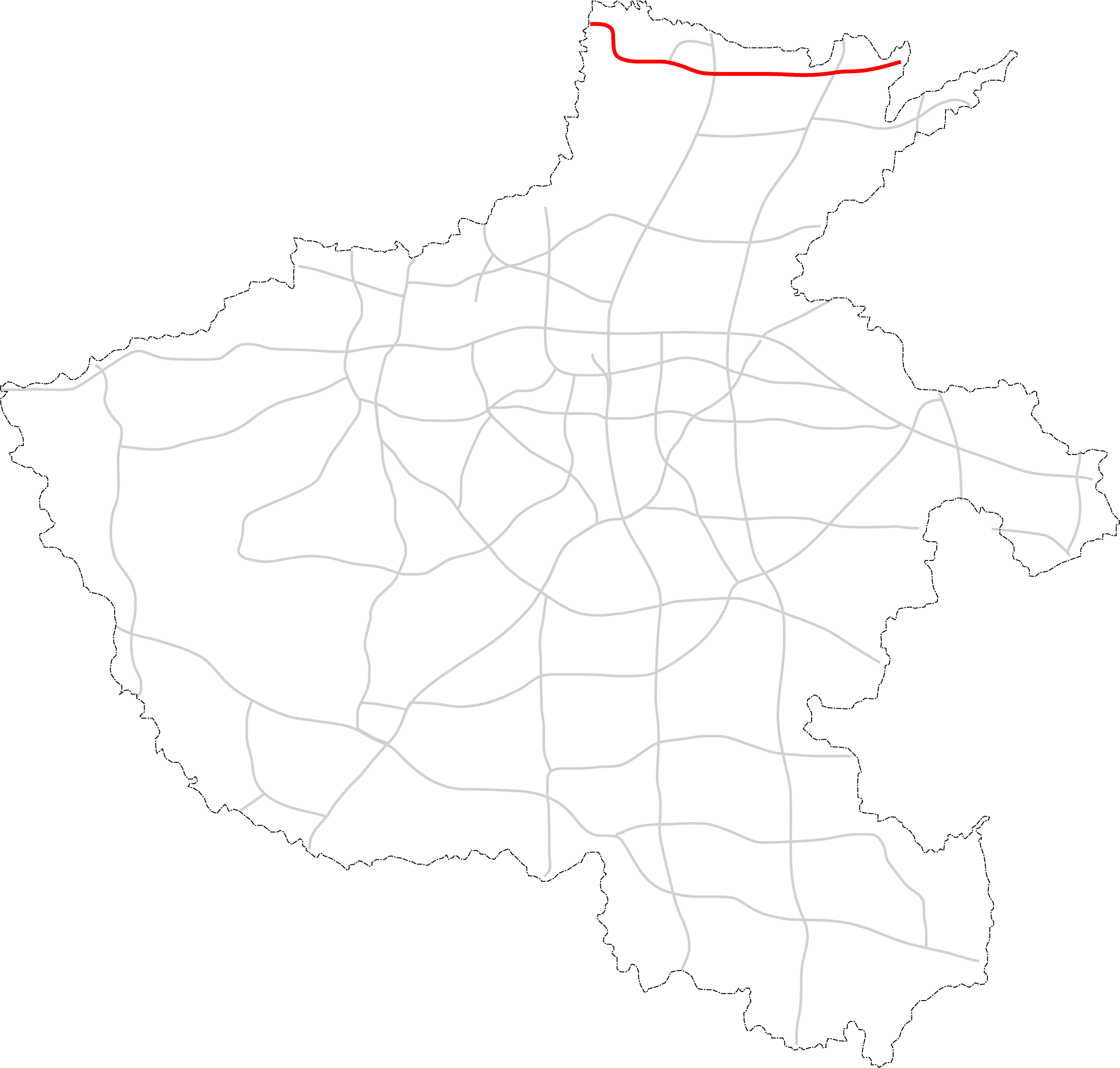

Route information
- Length: 170 km (110 mi)
- Existed: 2007–2024

Major junctions
- East end: S209 Road, Nanle County, Puyang, Henan (current); Border of Henan and Shandong near Nanle County, Puyang, Henan (planned)
- G45 – Qingshigun, Puyang; G4 – Anyang
- West end: Border of Henan and Shanxi near Linzhou, Anyang, Henan

Location
- Country: China
- Province: Henan

Highway system
- Transport in China

The Nanle–Linzhou Expressway (Chinese: 南乐－林州高速公路), abbreviated as Nanlin Expressway (Chinese: 南林高速) and designated as S22 in Henan's expressway system, is 170-kilometre (110 mi) long regional expressway in the northern part of Henan, China.

The section west of Anyang runs concurrently with the G0411 Anyang–Changzhi Expressway.

== Detailed itinerary ==
From east to west
Nanle East; S209 Road; Nanle County, Puyang
Nanle South; G106 Road; Nanle County, Puyang
G45 Daqing–Guangzhou Expressway
Neihuang; S215 Road; Neihuang County, Anyang
Anyang East Service Area
Anyang East; S219 Road; Anyang County, Anyang
Jiangtai Service Area
G4 Beijing–Hong Kong and Macau Expressway
Anyang Development Zone; G107 Road, S303 Road; Wenfeng District, Anyang
Anyang West; Wenming Avenue; Long'an District, Anyang
Qugou Service Area
Shuiye; S221 Road, S301 Road; Anyang County, Anyang
Linzhou; S226 Road, S301 Road; Linzhou, Anyang
Taihang Gorge; Linzhou, Anyang
Linzhou Service Area
Red Flag Canal; S228 Road; Anyang County, Anyang Red Flag Canal
Yujin Toll Station
Continues as S76 Pingshun–Changzhi Expressway
From west to east
