= Liucun =

Liucun may refer to the following places in China:

- Liucun Town, Beijing
- Liucun, Baoding, Hebei
- Liucun, Shanxi, in Linfen, Shanxi
- Liucun Township, Hebei, in Shenze County, Hebei
- Liucun Township, Henan, in Neihuang County, Henan
- Liucun station, a station of Nanjing Metro in Nanjing, Jiangsu
