= S97 =

S97 may refer to:

- Anderson Field (Washington), in Okanogan County, Washington, United States
- GCIRS 16SW, a star
- S97 Luoyang-Lushi Expressway, China
- SAS Spear (S97), formerly SAS Maria van Riebeeck, a submarine of the South African Navy
- Sikorsky S-97 Raider, an American helicopter prototype
- S97, a non-geographic postcode in Sheffield, England
