= G3031 Shangqiu–Gushi Expressway =

Road in China

Shangqiu–Gushi Expressway
- 商丘－固始高速公路
- Shanggu Expressway 商固高速公路

Route information
- Auxiliary route of G30
- Existed: 2022–present

Major junctions
- North end: Luogang Interchange connecting G30 in Shangqiu, Henan
- G1516 in Zhoukou, Henan; G36 in Zhoukou, Henan Anhui S33 (S33) / G3611 (under construction) in Fuyang, Anhui; G3611 in Xinyang, Henan
- South end: Xiaohuoyao Interchange connecting G40 in Gushi County, Xinyang, Henan

Location
- Country: China

Highway system
- National Trunk Highway System; Primary; Auxiliary; National Highways; Transport in China
← G3021	→ G3032

The G3031 Shangqiu–Gushi Expressway (Chinese: 商丘—固始高速公路), also referred to as the Shanggu Expressway (Chinese: 商固高速公路), is an expressway in China that connects Shangqiu to Gushi County.

== Route ==
The expressway begins in Shangqiu, passes through Dancheng County and Linquan County, before terminating in Gushi County. The northern and southern sections of the route are located in Henan with the central section travelling through Anhui.

== Exit list ==
From north to south

Location	km	mi	Exit	Name	Destinations	Notes
G3031 (Shangqiu - Gushi Expressway)
Continues north towards Puyang as Henan S21 (S21)
Ningling, Shangqiu, Henan	0	0		Luogang Interchange	G30 – Shangqiu, Lianyungang, Kaifeng, Zhengzhou	Northern terminus
Sui County, Shangqiu, Henan	Sui County East Service Area					
Sui County, Shangqiu, Henan				(nameless exit)	Jinxiu Avanue, Sui County urban area	In the service area above and under planning
Sui County, Shangqiu, Henan			16	Suidong New Area	G343 – Suidong New Area, Ningling	
Sui County, Shangqiu, Henan			19	Zhoutang Interchange	Henan S60 (S60) – Ningling, Shangqiu, Sui County, Dengfeng	
Sui County, Shangqiu, Henan			31	Sui County South	Henan S214 – Huiji, Hedi	
Zhecheng, Shangqiu, Henan			56	Liyuan Interchange	Henan S81 (S81) – Huaiyang, Zhoukou, Zhecheng West, Shangqiu	
Zhecheng, Shangqiu, Henan			58	Zhecheng South	Henan S207 – Zhecheng South, Liyuan	
Zhecheng, Shangqiu, Henan	Zhecheng South Service Area					
Luyi, Zhoukou, Henan			73	Gaoji Interchange	G1516 – Luyi, Yongcheng, Taikang, Xuchang	
Luyi, Zhoukou, Henan			80	Shiliang	G311 – Xinji, Shiliang	
Luyi, Zhoukou, Henan			86	Renji	Henan S322 – Renji, Zhangdian	
Dancheng, Zhoukou, Henan	Dancheng Service Area					
Dancheng, Zhoukou, Henan			104	Dancheng West	G344 – Dancheng West, Huaiyang	
Dancheng, Zhoukou, Henan			114	Dancheng South	Henan S324 – Dancheng South, Zhoukou	
Shenqiu, Zhoukou, Henan			131	Shenqiu North	Henan S211 – Shenqiu North, Shenqiu	
Shenqiu, Zhoukou, Henan	Shenqiu East Service Area					
Shenqiu, Zhoukou, Henan			140	Xin'anji Interchange	G36 – Bengbu, Nanjing, Zhoukou, Luoyang	
Shenqiu, Zhoukou, Henan			146	Gangtie Xincheng (Steel New City)	G239 – Gangtie Xincheng, Shicao	
Shenqiu, Zhoukou, Henan				Zhaodeying	X011 – Zhaodeying	
Shenqiu, Zhoukou, Henan	Zhaodeying Service Area					
Shenqiu, Zhoukou, Henan				Xingzhuang	Henan S216 – Xingzhuang	
Shenqiu, Zhoukou, Henan				Xingzhuang Interchange	Henan S48 (S48)	Under construction
Linquan, Fuyang, Anhui	Linquan West Service Area					
Linquan, Fuyang, Anhui				Linquan West	G220 – Linquan	
Linquan, Fuyang, Anhui				Linquan Interchange	Anhui S12 (S12)	
Linquan, Fuyang, Anhui				Linquan South	G220 – Huaji	
Linquan, Fuyang, Anhui	Lüzhai Service Area					
Funan, Fuyang, Anhui				Gongqiao Interchange	Anhui S33 (S33) / G3611	Northeast end of G3611 concurrency
Funan, Fuyang, Anhui				Fangji	Anhui S320 – Fangji	
Huaibin, Xinyang, Henan				Huaibin North	G328 – Huaibin	
Huaibin, Xinyang, Henan	Huaibin Service Area					
Huaibin, Xinyang, Henan				Qianyuan Interchange	G3611 – Xinyang	Southwest end of G3611 concurrency
Huaibin, Xinyang, Henan				Huaibin	Henan S335 (Wuliangye Avanue) – Huaibin	
Huaibin, Xinyang, Henan				Huaibin South	G220 – Zhangzhuang	
Gushi, Xinyang, Henan	Gushi Service Area					
Gushi, Xinyang, Henan				Sujiagang Interchange	Henan S80 (S80)	Under construction
Gushi, Xinyang, Henan				Gushi	G312 – Gushi	
Gushi, Xinyang, Henan				Xiaohuoyao Interchange	G40 – Lu'an, Shanghai, Xinyang, Xi'an	
Continues south towards Shangcheng as Henan S23 (S23)
Closed/former; Concurrency terminus; HOV only; Incomplete access; Tolled; Route transition; Unopened
