= G3615 Luoyang–Lushi Expressway =

Road in Henan, China

Luoyang–Lushi Expressway
- 洛阳－卢氏高速公路
- Luolu Expressway 洛卢高速
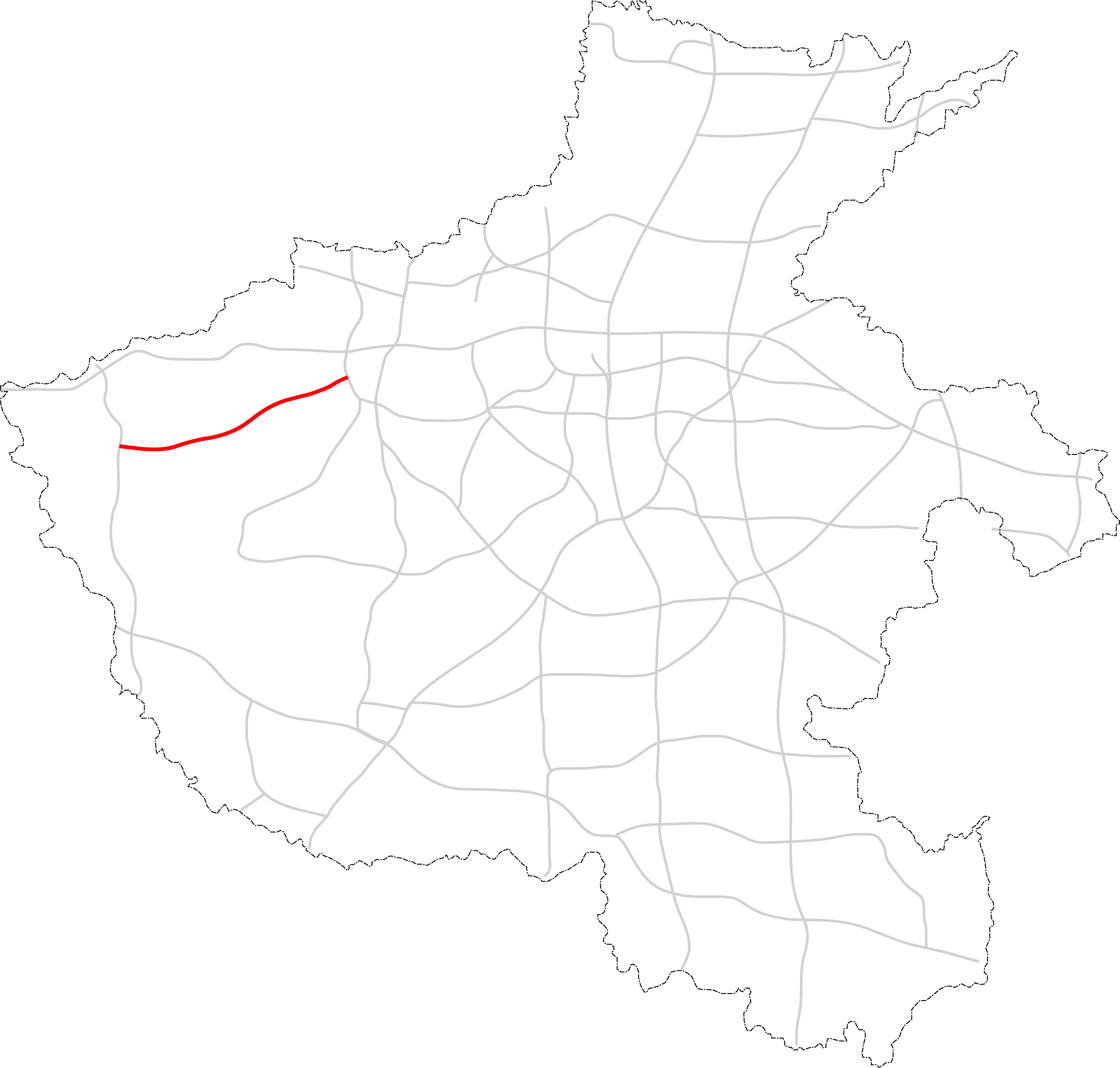

Route information
- Auxiliary route of G36
- Length: 137.3 km (85.3 mi)
- Existed: December 31 2012–present

Major junctions
- East end: Zhoushan Toll Station in Jianxi District, Luoyang, Henan
- G36 in Luoyang, Henan
- West end: G59 in Sanmenxia, Henan

Location
- Country: China
- Province: Henan

Highway system
- National Trunk Highway System; Primary; Auxiliary; National Highways; Transport in China
← G3613	→ G40

The Luoyang–Lushi Expressway (Chinese: 洛阳－卢氏高速公路), designated as G3615 and commonly abbreviated as Luolu Expressway (Chinese: 洛卢高速), is 137.3-kilometre (85.3 mi) long national expressway in Henan, China linking Luoyang and Lushi County. This expressway is a branch of the G36 Nanjing-Luoyang Expressway.

== History ==
This expressway was opened on December 31, 2012, as a section of the S85 Zhengzhou–Lushi Expressway. In 2015, the designations of expressways in Henan was adjusted and the expressway was re-designated as S97, and was re-designated again in 2019 to S92. When China's 2022 highway plan was released, the route was upgraded to a national expressway and changed to G3615.

== Exit list ==
From east to west

Location	km	mi	Exit	Name	Destinations	Notes
G3615 (Luoyang - Lushi Expressway)
Continues east towards downtown Luoyang as W. Jiudu Road
Jianxi District, Luoyang, Henan	Zhoushan Toll Station					
Jianxi District, Luoyang, Henan	0	0	0	Wulonggou Interchange	G36 – G30, Pingdingshan, Nanjing	
Yiyang, Luoyang, Henan			16	Yiyang	Yiyang, S314	
Yiyang, Luoyang, Henan				Liuquan Interchange	Henan S97 (S97) – Jiyuan, Xin'an, Yichuan	
Yiyang, Luoyang, Henan			43	Hancheng, G241 – Mianchi		
Yiyang, Luoyang, Henan	Hancheng Service Area					
Luoning, Luoyang, Henan			62	Luoning East Interchange	Henan S57 (S57) – Mianchi, Yuanqu, Yanhe Rd., Luoning East	
Luoning, Luoyang, Henan			68	Luoning	Luoning, Yongning Ave.	
Luoning, Luoyang, Henan			87	Luoning West	Luoning West, G241 – Luanchuan	
Luoning, Luoyang, Henan			114	Shangge	Shangge, G343 – Guxian	
Luoning, Luoyang, Henan	Guxian Service Area					
Lushi, Sanmenxia, Henan			137	Guandaokou Interchnge	G59 – Lingbao, Yuncheng, Lushi, Shiyan	
Merges into G59
Closed/former; Concurrency terminus; HOV only; Incomplete access; Tolled; Route transition; Unopened
