= G0412 Shenzhen–Nanning Expressway =

Road in China

Shenzhen–Nanning Expressway
- 深圳－南宁高速公路
- Shennan Expressway 深南高速公路

Route information
- Auxiliary route of G4

Major junctions
- West end: Nanning, Guangxi
- East end: Shenzhen, Guangdong

Location
- Country: China

Highway system
- National Trunk Highway System; Primary; Auxiliary; National Highways; Transport in China
← G0411	→ G0413

The G0412 Shenzhen–Nanning Expressway (Chinese: 深圳—南宁高速公路), also known as the Shennan Expressway (Chinese: 深南高速公路), is expressway under construction in China that will connect Shenzhen, Guangdong to Nanning, Guangxi.

== Route ==
The expressway will start at the Lingdingyang Bridge in Shenzhen and pass through Zhuhai, Jiangmen, Maoming and Yulin, before terminating in Nanning.
