= G0411 Anyang–Changzhi Expressway =

Road in China

Anyang–Changzhi Expressway
- 安阳－长治高速公路
- Anchang Expressway 安长高速公路

Route information
- Auxiliary route of G4

Major junctions
- West end: Shanxi S2201 / X673 in Huguan County, Changzhi, Shanxi
- East end: G4 / Henan S22 in Wenfeng District, Anyang, Henan

Location
- Country: China

Highway system
- National Trunk Highway System; Primary; Auxiliary; National Highways; Transport in China
← G0401	→ G0412

The G0411 Anyang–Changzhi Expressway (Chinese: 安阳—长治高速公路), also referred to as the Anchang Expressway (Chinese: 安长高速公路), is an expressway in China that connects Anyang, Henan to Changzhi, Shanxi.

== Route ==
=== Henan ===
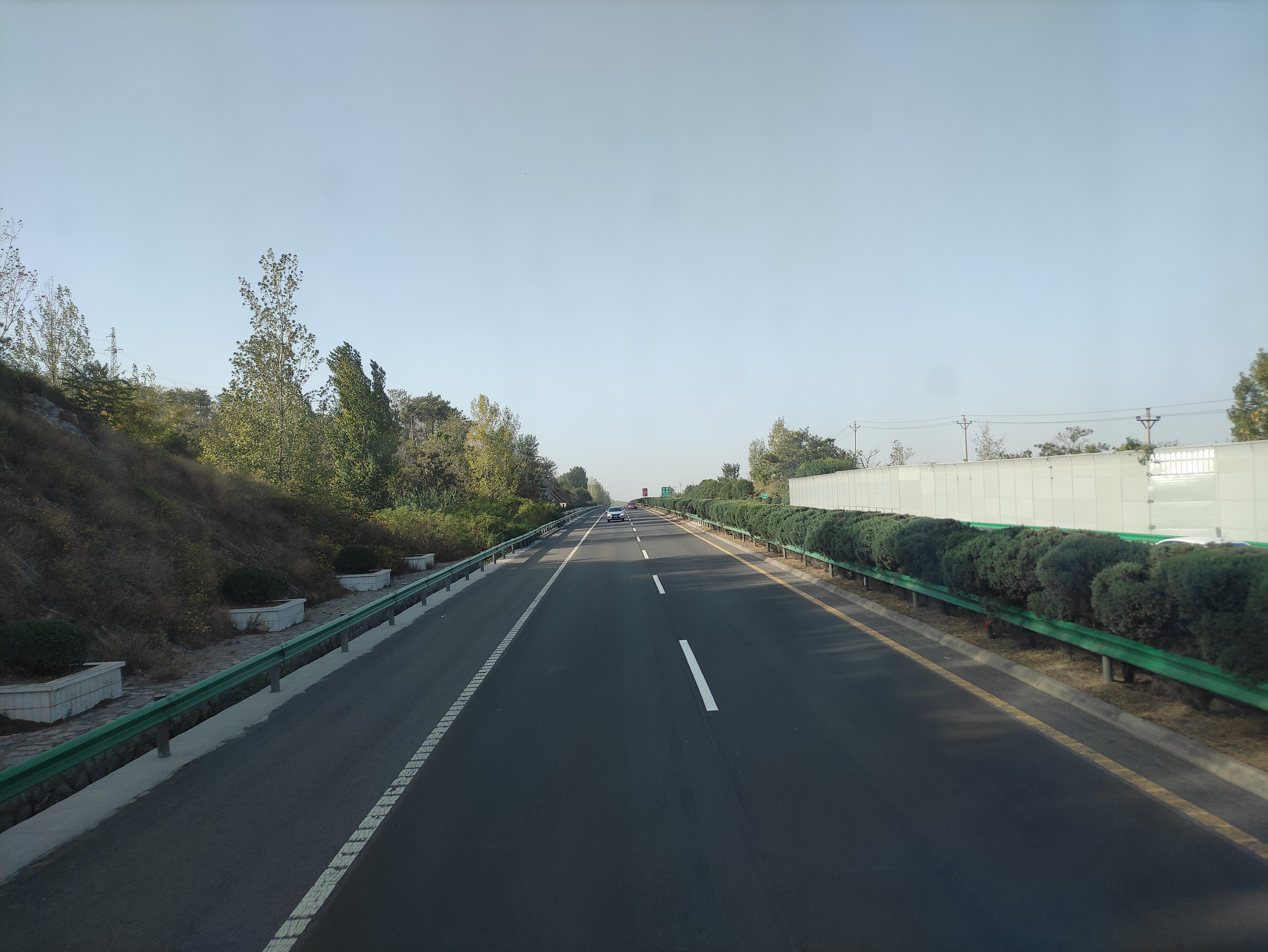
Anchang Expressway in Anyang County, Henan

The Henan section of the Anchang Expressway runs concurrently with the S22 Nanlin Expressway from Anyang to the boundary of Henan-Shanxi Province. Among them, the section from Anyang to Linzhou was completed and opened to traffic in October 2006. The section from Linzhou to the Henan-Shanxi border was completed and opened to traffic on 22 December 2012.

=== Shanxi ===
The Shanxi section of the Anchang Expressway is the original S76 Changping Expressway. It passes through Pingshun County and Huguan County along the way, with a total length of 39.910 kilometers. It was officially opened to traffic on 29 May 2013. Among them, the Hongtiguan Tunnel passing through the Taihang Mountains is the second longest highway tunnel in Shanxi, with a total length of 13.12 km, second only to the Taigu Expressway Xishan Tunnel.
