= 2022 Anyang factory fire =

Disaster in Henan, China

- Date: 21 November 2022
- Time: 16:22
- Location: Wenfeng District, Anyang, Henan, China
- Cause: Believed to be violations of electric welding policies
- Deaths: 38
- Injuries: 2

On 21 November 2022, at 16:22, a factory fire started, killing 38 people and injuring two others in Wenfeng District, Anyang City, Henan, central China. According to state media, the fire was started by "illegal welding".

More than 200 rescuers and 60 firemen battled the blaze, and there were also psychologists on the site for the victims' relatives. State media said that the fire started at a facility belonging to a tiny, privately held company in Anyang's "high tech zone" without going into further detail about the nature of the business.
