= G3612 Pingdingshan–Yichang Expressway =

Road in China

Pingdingshan–Yichang Expressway
- 平顶山－宜昌高速公路
- Pingyi Expressway 平宜高速公路

Route information
- Auxiliary route of G36

Major junctions
- North end: G36 in Pingdingshan, Henan
- South end: G42 in Yichang, Hubei

Location
- Country: China

Highway system
- National Trunk Highway System; Primary; Auxiliary; National Highways; Transport in China
← G3611	→ G3613

The G3612 Pingdingshan–Yichang Expressway (Chinese: 平顶山至宜昌高速公路), also referred to as the Pingyi Expressway (Chinese: 平宜高速公路), is an expressway in China that connects Pingdingshan, Henan to Yichang, Hubei.

== Route ==
=== Henan ===
==== Pingdingshan to Nanyang ====
The original S83 Lannan Expressway section from Pingdingshan to Nanyang, has a design speed of 100 kilometers per hour and was opened to traffic on 12 December 2004.

==== Nanyang to Xinye ====
The section from Nanyang to Xinye has a total length of around 60 kilometers.

=== Hubei ===
Map of the Pinyi Expressway in Hubei

==== Xinye to Xiangyang ====
The section from Xinye to Xiangyang has a total length of around 70 kilometers.

==== Xiangyang to Yichang ====
The Xiangyi Expressway starts from the South Outer Ring Road of Xiangyang City, passes through Xiangcheng District, Nanzhang County, Yuan'an County, Dangyang, and connects with the G42 Shanghai–Chengdu Expressway in Yiling District.

The route is 156 kilometers long and had a construction period of 48 months. Upon completion, the expressway travel time between Yichang and Xiangyang was shortened from 3 hours to 1.5 hours.
