= S1 Zhengzhou Airport Expressway =

Road in Henan, China

Zhengzhou Airport Expressway

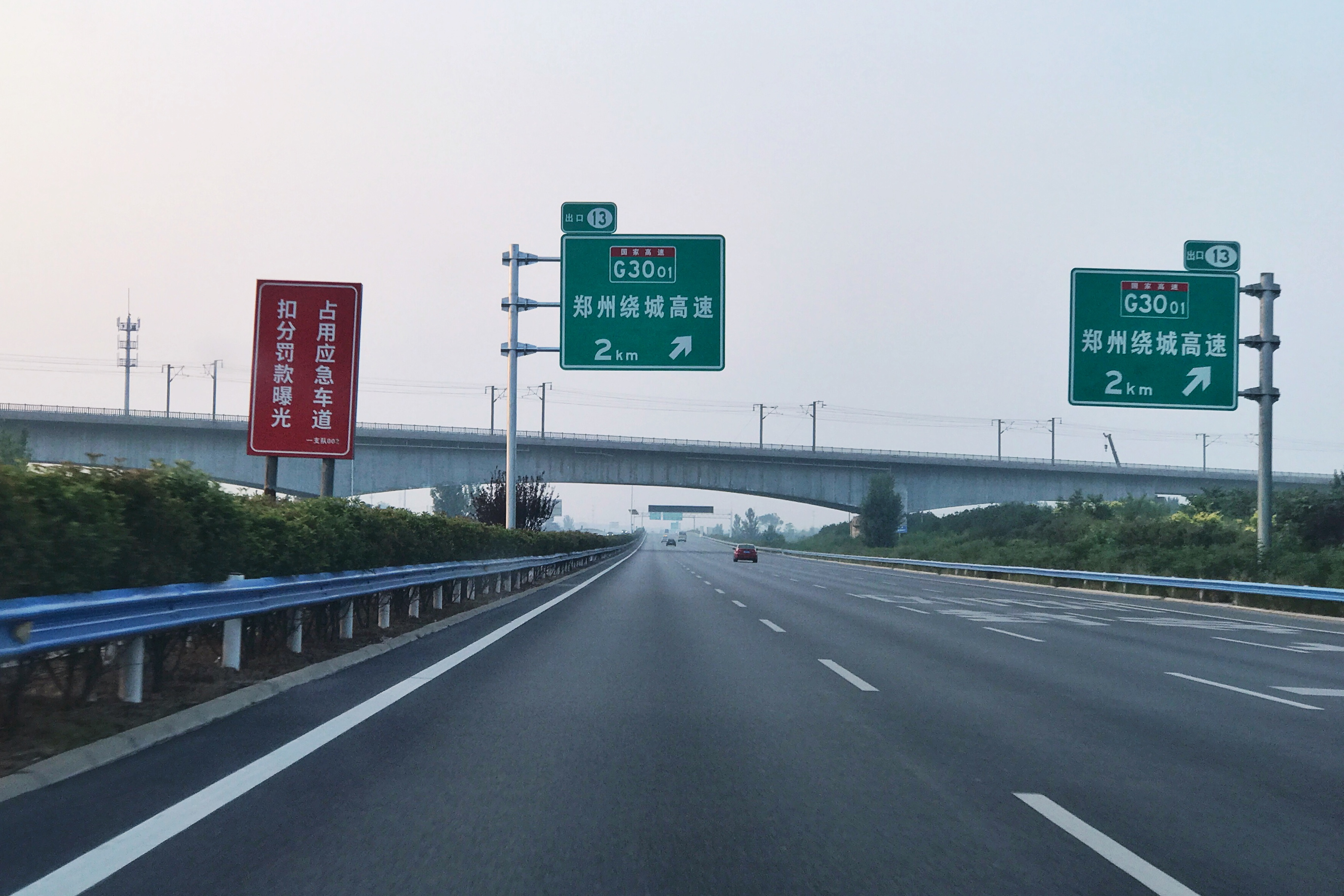

Route information
- Length: 26.4 km (16.4 mi)

Major junctions
- North end: Zhongzhou Avenue & Longhai Expressway Interchange in Jinshui District, Zhengzhou, Henan
- G3001 – Zhengzhou; Yingbin Elevated Road – Zhengzhou Xinzheng International Airport
- South end: G4 in Xinzheng, Zhengzhou, Henan

Location
- Country: China
- Province: Henan

Highway system
- Transport in China

The Zhengzhou Airport Expressway (Chinese: 郑州机场高速公路), designated as S1 in Henan's expressway system, is 26.4-kilometre-long expressway (16.4 mi) in Zhengzhou, Henan, China. The expressway connects Zhengzhou city center to Zhengzhou Xinzheng International Airport.

== History ==
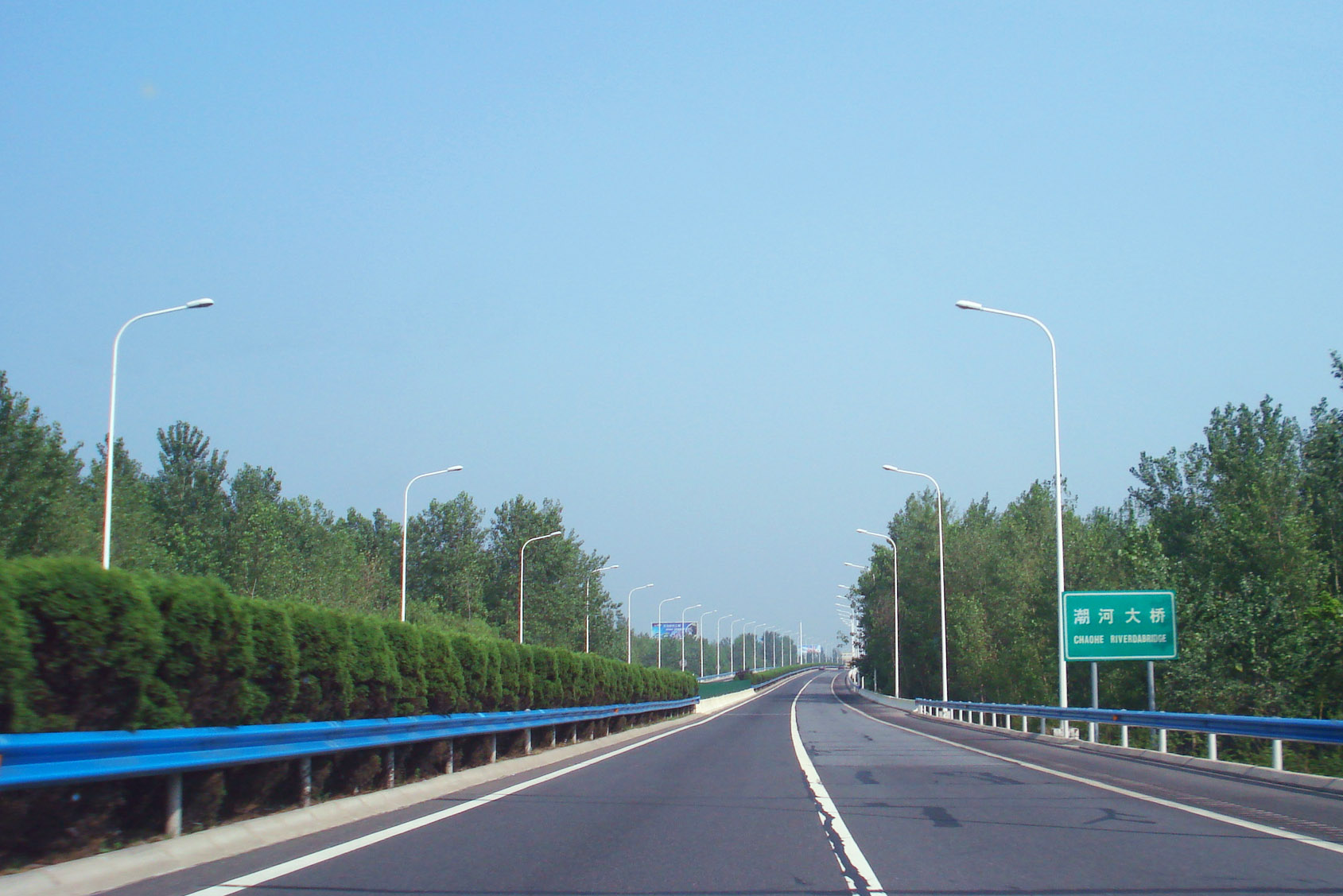
The expressway in 2006

The expressway was initially a section of the Zhengzhou–Xuchang Expressway, which was opened in the mid 1990s as a section of the Beijing–Zhuhai Expressway (Jingzhu Expressway, the G030 expressway then). On 1 October 2004, with the completion of the Xinxiang–Xuedian section of the Jingzhu Expressway, this expressway was dedicated to serve as a link between Zhengzhou city center and Zhengzhou Xinzheng International Airport and was re-designated as S1 in Henan's expressway system.

During 2014-2016, the expressway underwent a renovation project, which widened it from 4 lanes to 8 lanes.

== Route ==
The S1 expressway starts at the interchange of Zhongzhou Avenue and Longhai Expressway as an eight-lane controlled-access expressway. It then heads southeast, intersecting with Hanghai E. Road and South 3rd Ring Road before becoming a tolled expressway at Zhengzhou South Toll Station. It meets G3001 Zhengzhou Ring Expressway near Xiangyunsi, and then runs in parallel to G4 Beijing–Hong Kong and Macau Expressway just to its west. At Airport exit, it connects to Yingbin Elevated Road, a 1.48 kilometres (0.92 mi) long elevated expressway going directly to Zhengzhou Xinzheng International Airport. S1 continues south for about 2 kilometres (1.2 mi) as a four-lane expressway, before it joins G4 Beijing–Hong Kong and Macau Expressway near Xuedian at its southern terminus.

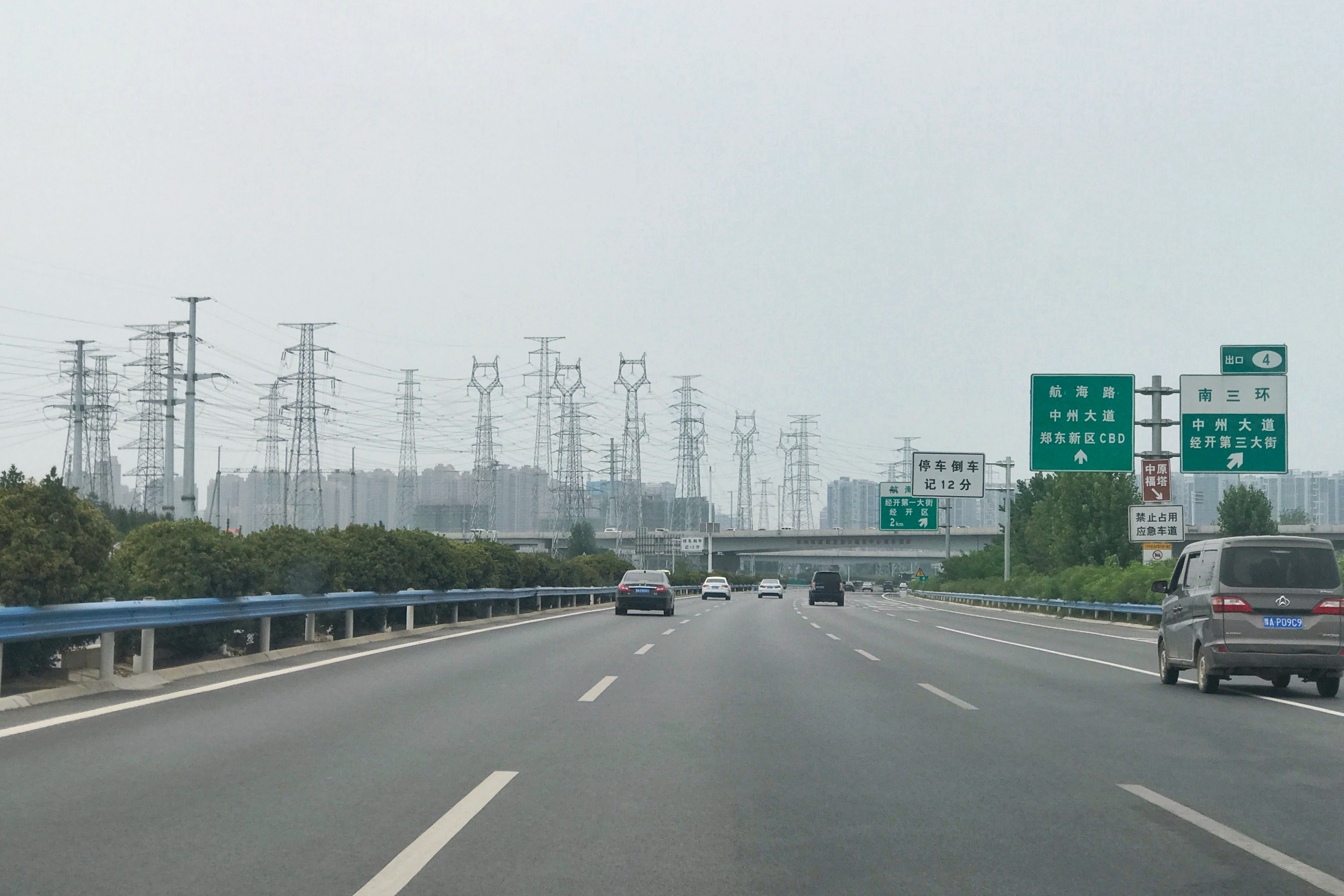
The expressway near South 3rd Ring Road

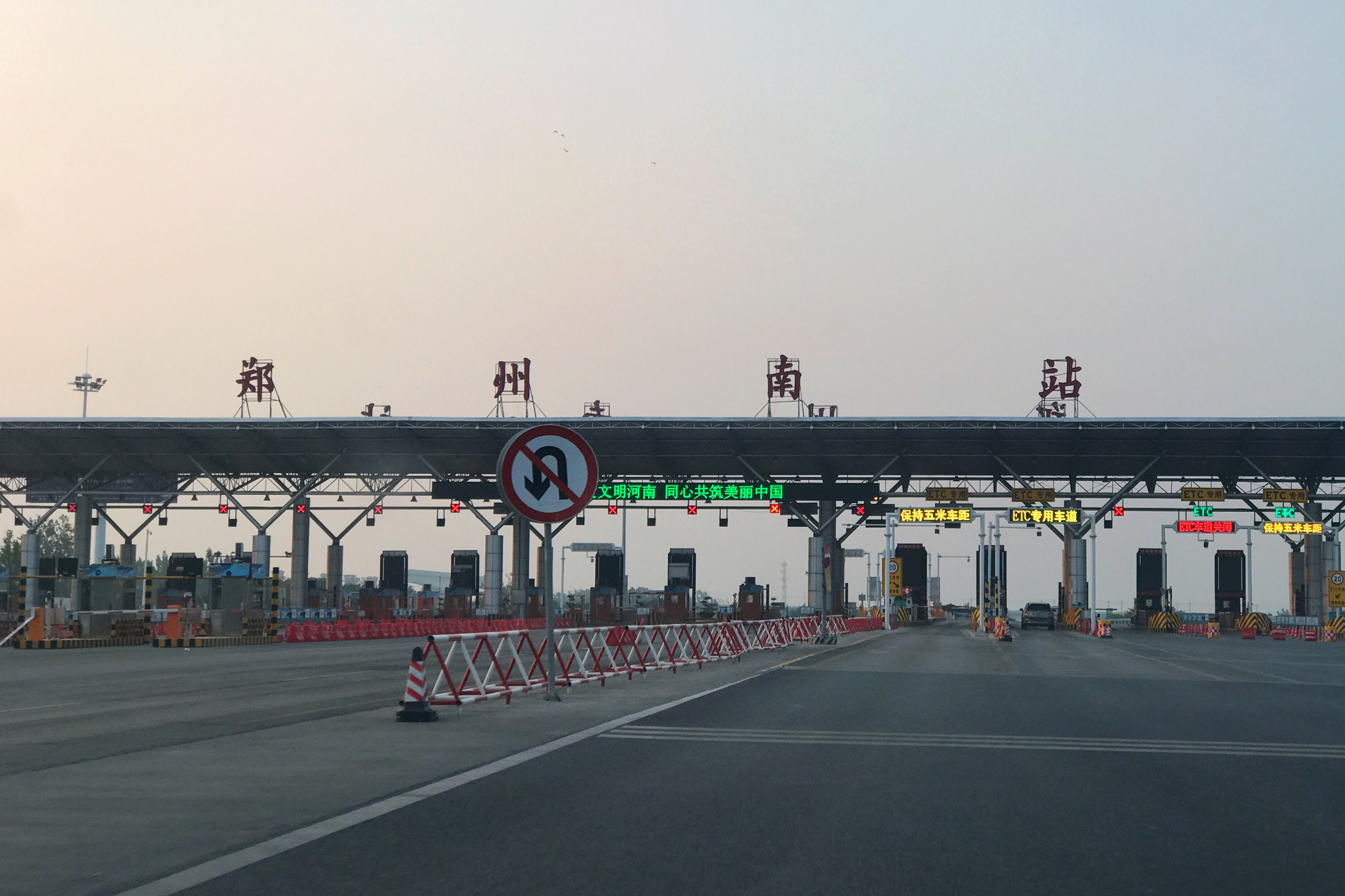
Zhengzhou South Toll Station

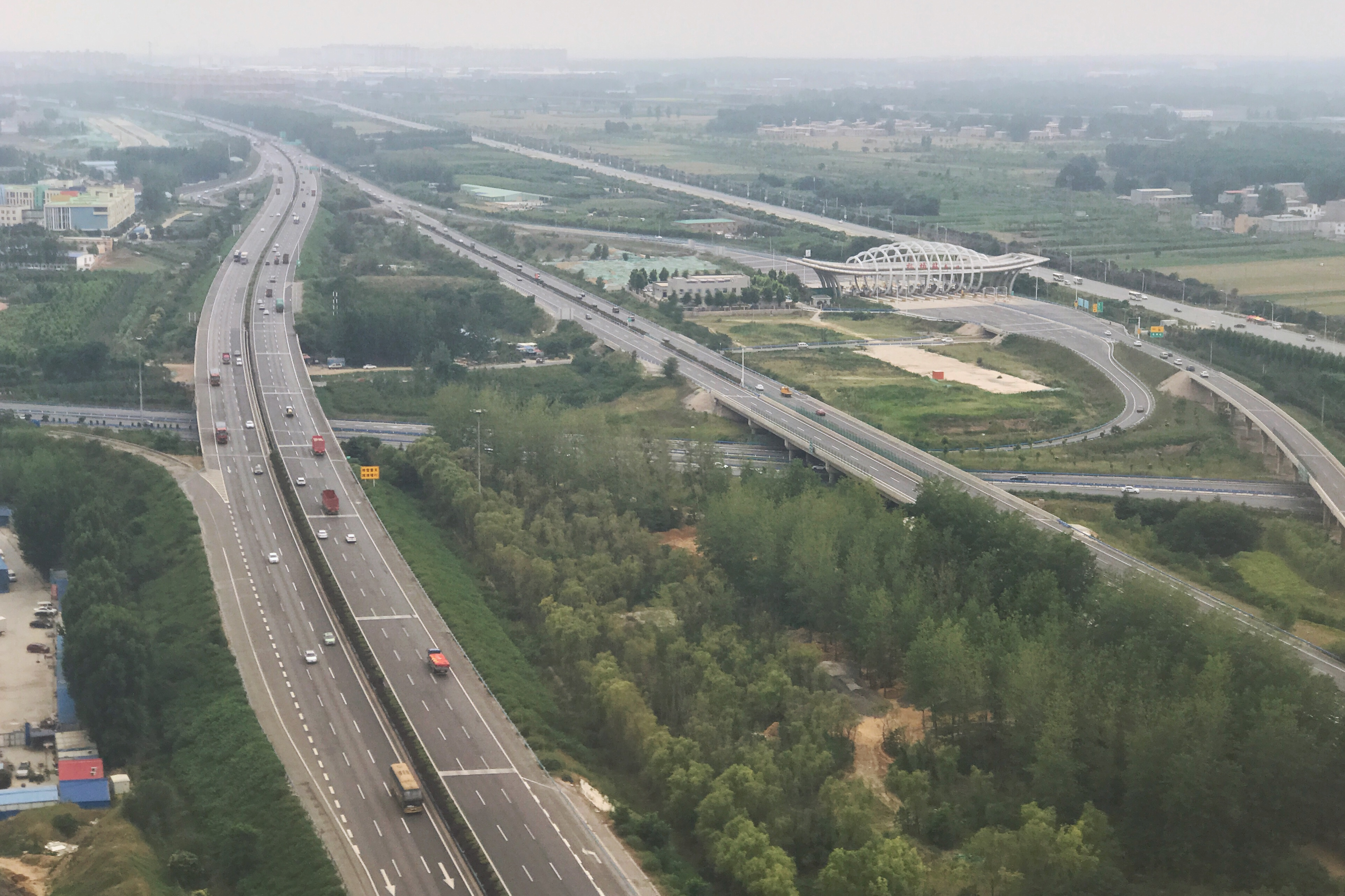
G4 (left) and S1 Expressway (middle) near Zhengzhou Xinzheng International Airport

== Road conditions ==
=== Speed Limit ===
The maximum speed limit is 120 km/h for the left two lanes and 100 km/h for the right two lanes. The minimum speed limit is 60 km/h.

=== Tolls ===
¥10 will be charged for vehicles using this expressway. (Zhengzhou South Toll Station–Xinzheng Airport Toll Gate)

=== Lanes ===
8 lanes. (4 lanes for each direction)

=== Surface conditions ===
The road surface was paved in asphalt.

== List of exits ==
Location	km	mi	Exit	Name	Destinations	Notes
Henan S1 (Zhengzhou Airport Expressway)
Continues north as Zhongzhou Avenue
Jinshui District, Zhengzhou	0	0	0	Zhongzhou Ave.	Zhongzhou Avenue – Zhengdong New Area CBD; Longhai Expressway	
Guancheng Hui District, Zhengzhou	2	1.2	2	Hanghai Road	Hanghai E. Rd.	
Guancheng Hui District, Zhengzhou	4	2.5	4A-B	South 3rd Ring Rd.	South 3rd Ring Road	No northbound entrance from westbound S. 3rd Ring Road
Guancheng Hui District, Zhengzhou	Zhengzhou South Toll Station					
Zhongmu County, Zhengzhou	13	8.1	13	Zhengzhou South Interchange	G3001 – Zhengzhou	No northbound exit to eastbound G3001 and southbound entrance from westbound G3001
Zhongmu County, Zhengzhou	17	11	17	ZAEZ North	Hongzehu Avenue, Huaxia Avenue	
Xinzheng, Zhengzhou	25	16	25	Airport	Yingbin Elevated Road – Zhengzhou Xinzheng International Airport	
Xinzheng, Zhengzhou	26	16		G4 – Xinzheng, Xuchang		Southbound exit and northbound entrance only
Continues south as G4
Closed/former; Concurrency terminus; HOV only; Incomplete access; Tolled; Route transition; Unopened
