= Liucun Township, Henan =

Liucun Township 六村乡
- Township
- Location in Henan
- Coordinates: 35°48′55″N 114°45′13″E
- Country: People's Republic of China
- Province: Henan
- Prefecture-level city: Anyang
- County: Neihuang County
- Time zone: UTC+8 (China Standard)

Liucun Township (Chinese: 六村乡; pinyin: Liùcūn Xiāng) is a township of Neihuang County in northern Henan province, China. As of 2020, it has 22 villages under its administration:

- Yangsang Village (杨桑村)
- Guosang Village (郭桑村)
- Zhangsang Village (张桑村)
- Xue Village (薛村)
- Pochekou Village (破车口)
- Wenxinggu Village (温邢固)
- Maxinggu Village (马邢固)
- Liuxinggu Village (刘邢固)
- Shangzhuang Village (尚庄村)
- Qiankou Village (千口)
- Maji Village (马集)
- Zhaozhuang Village (赵庄村)
- Qianhua Village (前化村)
- Zhonghua Village (中化村)
- Houhua Village (后化村)
- Taiping Village (太平村)
- Beiliu Village (北六村)
- Yuanliu Village (袁六村)
- Dailiu Village (代六村)
- Chenliu Village (陈六村)
- Muliu Village (穆六村)
- Jiao Village (焦村)

== See also ==
- List of township-level divisions of Henan
