= Liucun, Baoding =

Liucun 留村镇
- Town
- Location in Hebei
- Coordinates: 38°56′39″N 115°34′7″E
- Country: People's Republic of China
- Province: Hebei
- Prefecture-level city: Baoding
- District: Xushui District
- Time zone: UTC+8 (China Standard)

Liucun (Chinese: 留村; pinyin: Liúcūn) is a town in Xushui District, Baoding, Hebei province, China. As of 2020, it has 18 villages under its administration:

- Liucun Village
- Nangaoqiao Village (南高桥村)
- Changle Village (常乐村)
- Shizhuang Village (师庄村)
- Beichangpu Village (北常堡村)
- Liudongying Village (留东营村)
- Dongzhuang Village (东庄村)
- Nanzhuang Village (南庄村)
- Tianzhuang Village (田庄村)
- Hujiaying Village (胡家营村)
- Yi Village (仪村)
- Shandongying Village (山东营村)
- Liuxiangdian Village (刘祥店村)
- Banbidian Village (半壁店村)
- Jingtangpu Village (荆塘埔村)
- Daying Village (大营村)
- Nanting Village (南亭村)
- Beigaoqiao Village (北高桥村)

== See also ==
- List of township-level divisions of Hebei
