= G59 Hohhot–Beihai Expressway =

Expressway in China

Hohhot–Beihai Expressway
- 呼和浩特－北海高速公路
- 呼北高速公路; Hubei Expressway

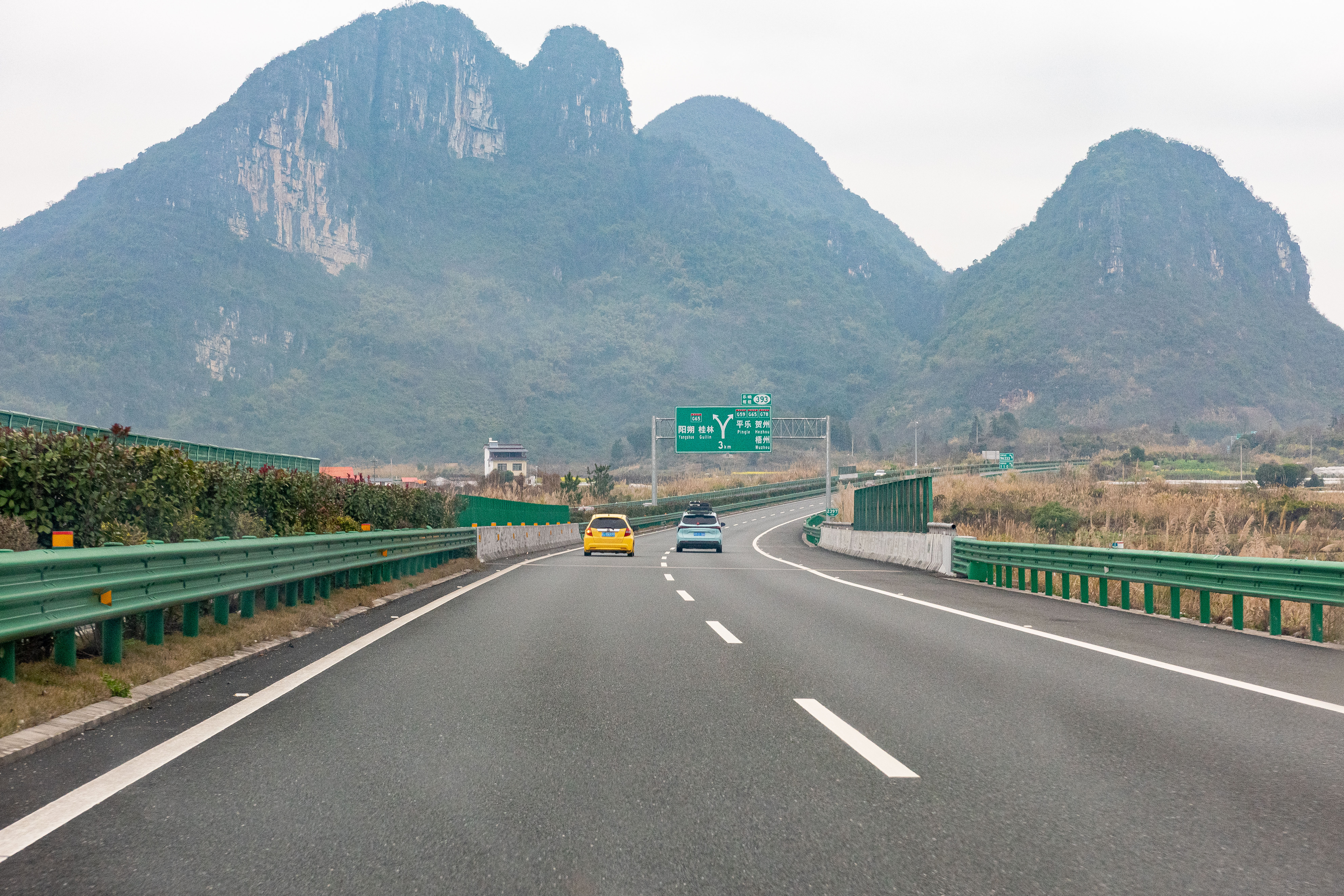
- G59 in Yangshuo County, Guangxi

Route information
- Length: 2,628 km (1,633 mi)

Major junctions
- North end: Hohhot, Inner Mongolia
- South end: Beihai, Guangxi

Location
- Country: China

Highway system
- National Trunk Highway System; Primary; Auxiliary; National Highways; Transport in China
← G5621	→ G5901

The Hohhot–Beihai Expressway (Chinese: 呼和浩特–北海高速公路), designated as G59 and commonly referred to as the Hubei Expressway (Chinese: 呼北高速公路; not to be confused with the province of Hubei), is an under-construction expressway in China. It is a major north–south expressway that when complete, will connect the cities of Hohhot, the capital of Inner Mongolia, with Beihai, on the southern coast, in the autonomous region of Guangxi. The expressway was announced as one of the eleven primary north–south expressways in China's expressway network on 24 May 2013.

G59 Hubei Expressway in Hubei Province
