= G0424 Beijing–Wuhan Expressway =

Road in China

Beijing–Wuhan Expressway
- 北京－武汉高速公路
- Jingwu Expressway 京武高速公路

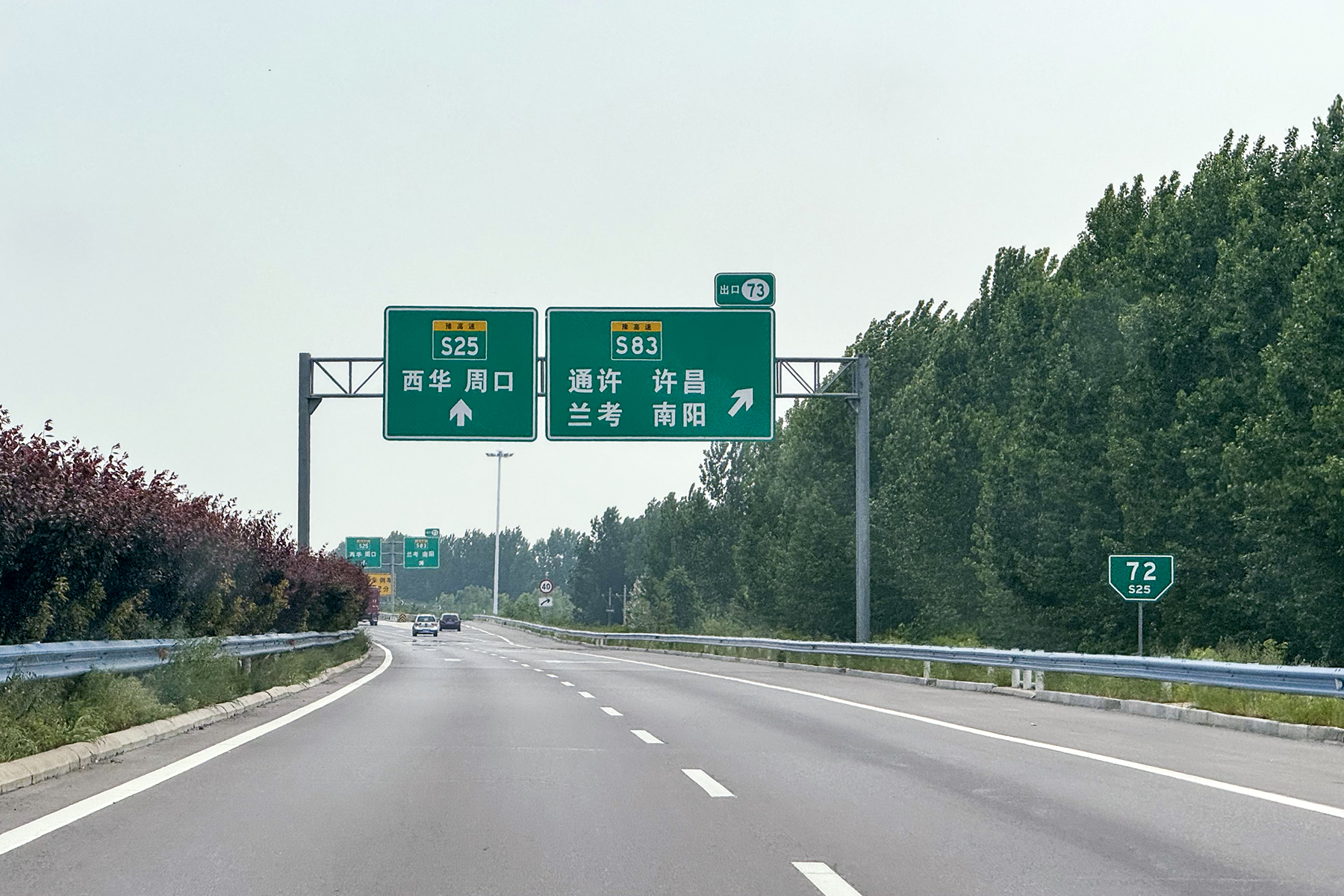
- S25 has been designated as G0424, but the signs have not been updated yet.

Route information
- Auxiliary route of G4

Major junctions
- North end: Beijing S50 in Fengtai District, Beijing
- South end: Huangpi District, Wuhan, Hubei

Location
- Country: China

Highway system
- National Trunk Highway System; Primary; Auxiliary; National Highways; Transport in China
← G0423	→ G0425

The G0424 Beijing–Wuhan Expressway (Chinese: 北京—武汉高速公路), also referred to as the Jingwu Expressway (Chinese: 京武高速公路), is an under construction expressway in China that will connect Beijing to Wuhan, Hubei via Zhengzhou, Henan. The expressway is fully completed in Beijing and Hubei while a few sections in Hebei and Henan still remain under construction.
