= G3611 Nanjing–Xinyang Expressway =

Road in China

Nanjing–Xinyang Expressway
- 南京－信阳高速公路
- Ningxin Expressway 宁信高速公路

Route information
- Auxiliary route of G36

Major junctions
- West end: G40 in Pingqiao District, Xinyang, Henan
- East end: G25 / G2503 in Luhe District, Nanjing, Jiangsu

Location
- Country: China

Highway system
- National Trunk Highway System; Primary; Auxiliary; National Highways; Transport in China
← G36	→ G3612

The G3611 Nanjing–Xinyang Expressway (Chinese: 南京—信阳高速公路), also referred to as the Ningxin Expressway (Chinese: 宁信高速公路), is an under construction expressway in China that will connect Nanjing, Jiangsu to Xinyang, Henan.

== Route ==
The route starts in Nanjing and travels through Lai'an County, Chuzhou, Hefei, Huoqiu County, Funan County and Huaibin County, before terminating in Xinyang. The expressway passes through the provinces of Anhui, Henan and Jiangsu.
