= Lushi County =

Lushi County 卢氏县 Lushih
- County
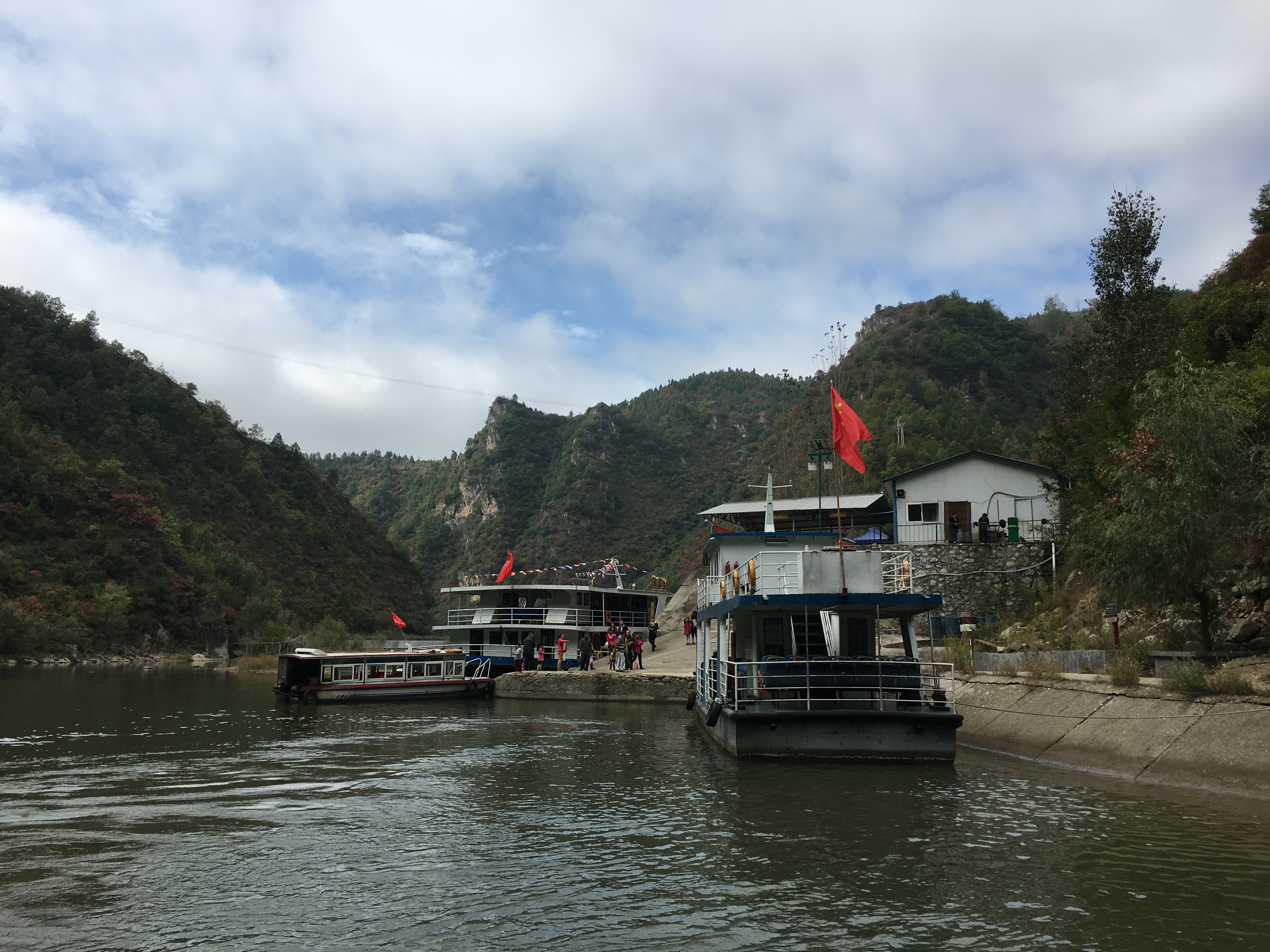

- Location in Henan
- Coordinates: 34°03′N 110°59′E
- Country: People's Republic of China
- Province: Henan
- Prefecture-level city: Sanmenxia

Area
  - Total: 4,004 km^{2} (1,546 sq mi)

Population (2020)
  - Total: 317,232
  - Density: 79.23/km^{2} (205.2/sq mi)
- Time zone: UTC+8 (China Standard)
- Postal code: 472200

Lushi County (simplified Chinese: 卢氏县; traditional Chinese: 盧氏縣; pinyin: Lúshì Xiàn) is a county under the jurisdiction of Sanmenxia City, Henan Province, the People's Republic of China. It is adjacent to Lingbao City in the north, Luoning County and Luanchuan County in the east, Xixia County in Nanyang City in the south, and Luonan County, Danfeng County and Shangnan County in Shaanxi Province in the west and southwest. It covers an area of 4,004 square kilometers and has a population of 317,232 in 2020. The county government is stationed in Chengguan Town. The county was established in 113 BC. It is the county with the largest area, the smallest population density and the highest average altitude in Henan Province, and it is also a provincial forest city in Henan Province.

== History ==
In the Paleolithic Age 100,000 years ago, the territory of Lushi County was the activity range of the Homo sapiens of Lushi. In the prehistoric period, there were Shilongtou Site, Guotai Site, Qicunwan Site, Gangtai Site, Huoyan Site, Sanjiaochengye Iron Site, etc. The archaeological site was the Xindi of the Guo State in the Western Zhou dynasty, and in the Spring and Autumn period was the residence of the Yin Rong. The earliest record of the Lushi in the history books is the account of the Jin State in 456 BC in the "Bamboo Book Chronicles". According to the records of occupying this place, after the three families were divided into the Jin dynasty, King Han Xuan set up Sanchuan Commandery, which belonged to the county. Later Qin attacked Han and took Sanchuan Commandery. In 205 BC, Sanchuan Commandery was changed to Henan Commandery.

In 113 BC, Lushi County was established in the Han dynasty, which belongs to Hongnong Commandery. In the Western Jin dynasty, it belonged to Shangluo Commandery, Qingzhou was set up here in the former Qin dynasty, and Nanshan County, Shicheng County and Zhuyang County were located in the Lushi County in the Northern Wei dynasty, and the Lushi County was included in Han'an Commandery. In the Western Wei dynasty, Yichuan Commandery was established, and Lushi County belonged to it. In 583, the Sui dynasty abolished the Commandery and changed the prefecture to Guo Zhou. In 607, the prefecture was abolished. Lushi County belonged to Henan Commandery. In 617, Guo Commandery was established, under the jurisdiction of Lushi County, Hongnong County, and Taolin County, where the governance is located in Lushi County. In 618, the Tang dynasty changed Guo Commandery to Guo Zhou, and in 634 the administrative office was moved to Hongnong. In the Yuan dynasty, Song County, Luanchuan County and Lushi County belonged to Song Zhou, Nanyang Prefecture. In 1370, the Ming dynasty put Lushi County under the jurisdiction of Shanzhou, Henan Prefecture, and it belonged to Henan Prefecture in the Qing dynasty.

In 1913, it belonged to West Henan Road. In 1914, West Henan Road was changed to Heluo Road. In 1920, Lushi suffered a severe drought and famine occurred. From August 1923 to June 1924, there were three successive civil uprisings in Lushi County. In 1928, Heluo Road was abolished, and Lushi County was directly under Henan Province. In 1931, it belonged to the Office of the Commissioner of the Eleventh District of Shanzhou. In 1934, the 25th Red Army occupied Lushi and became the core area of the Red Army base in Hubei, Henan and Shaanxi. In December 1938, the CCP decided to establish a Communist Party organization in Lushi County. In August 1947, it was the first agency of Henan Province. In October, Sanchuan Town, Luanchuan Town, Taowan Town and Miaozi Town in Lushi County were placed under the newly established Luanchuan County.

In 1949, it belonged to the Shaanzhou Special Area. In the spring of 1951, the land reform movement in Lushi County began. On April 8, 1952, Lushi County was placed under the Luoyang Special Area. On March 2, Lushi County began an anti-rightist movement. In the autumn of 1958, a large number of laborers in Lushi County participated in the large-scale iron and steel smelting, which seriously affected agricultural production and caused a famine. During the Cultural Revolution in 1968, there were many armed fighting incidents in Lushi County. After the Cultural Revolution, Sanmenxia City was established in 1986, and Lushi was a county. In late July 2007, a severe flood occurred in Lushi County. On February 26, 2020, the Henan provincial government approved 14 counties including Lushi County to withdraw from poverty-stricken counties.

== Geography ==
Lushi County is located in the west of Henan Province, southwest of Sanmenxia City, and is connected to Luoning County and Luanchuan County in Luoyang City in the east; adjacent to Luonan County in Shangluo City, Shaanxi Province in the west; and Xixia County in Nanyang City and Shangluo in Shaanxi Province in the south. Danfeng County and Shangnan County in the city; the north is connected with Lingbao City, with a total area of 4004 square kilometers. Lushi County spans Liao Mountain, Xiong'er Mountain and Funiu Mountain. The terrain is high in the southwest and low in the northeast. It is mainly composed of mountains, hills and valley basins. The average elevation of the county is 1221 meters. The highest point in the territory is Yuhuangjian, which is 2057.9 meters above sea level. Lushi County is located between the Yellow River Basin and the Yangtze River Basin. The Luo River and Duguan River in the north belong to the Yellow River water system, and the drainage area accounts for about 70% of the county; the Laoguan River and Qi River in the south are the upper reaches of the Danjiang River, a tributary of the Han River. accounting for 30% of the county. There are more than 2,400 rivers and streams in the county, including 14 rivers with a drainage area of more than 100 square kilometers. The total amount of water resources in the county is 846 million cubic meters, the average annual runoff of surface water is 840 million cubic meters, and the total amount of development and utilization is 466 million cubic meters.

Lushi County has a total of 366,354.89 hectares of land. As of 2019, forest land accounted for 80.2%. A total of 52 kinds of minerals have been discovered, accounting for 49.1% of the total number of minerals discovered in Henan Province, including 22 kinds of metal minerals and 30 kinds of non-metal minerals, 19 kinds of which have been developed and utilized, with a potential economic value of more than 1 trillion With a proven resource reserve of 370 million tons of molybdenum ore, it ranks first in Henan Province; iron ore reserves are 78 million tons, and prospective reserves are 150 million tons, ranking second in Henan Province; antimony ore and lithium ore are characteristic minerals in Henan, and antimony ore The proven resource reserves are 3,370,800 tons, and the amount of metals is 104,000 tons; the proven reserves of lithium ore and rare metals are 7,894,700 tons, 58,200 tons of lithium metal, 18,400 tons of niobium and tantalum, and 570 tons of symbiotic cesium oxide. 1,650 tons of beryllium oxide, 809 tons of rubidium oxide. The proven resource reserves of high-quality chemical limestone in the southern part of the county are 612 million tons, which is considered to be the highest quality chemical limestone north of the Yangtze River.

Lushi County has well-preserved vegetation, with more than 2,400 species of various plants and more than 1,200 kinds of wild Chinese medicinal materials. It is one of the top ten traditional Chinese medicinal materials base counties in China. There are 21 species of wild plants under national key protection in China, among which the first-level key protected plants are Ginkgo biloba, yew, Taxus chinensis, Metasequoia; the second-class protected plants include 17 species such as Qinling fir and spruce. There are more than 400 species of wild animals, and 46 species of wild animals under national key protection in China. Among them, the first-level key protected wild animals include North China leopard, forest musk deer, black stork, golden eagle, white-shouldered eagle, and white-tailed sea eagle. The second-level key protected wild animals include 40 species of golden pheasant and giant salamander.

== Climate ==
Lushi County is located in the transition zone between subtropical zone and warm temperate zone, and has the characteristics of continental monsoon climate. Spring and autumn are shorter, winter and summer are longer, and the temperature difference between day and night is large. The annual precipitation is 646.9 mm, the annual sunshine hours are 2021.2 hours, the annual average temperature is 12.6 °C, the extreme maximum temperature is 40.6 °C, the extreme minimum temperature is -18.8 °C, and the frost-free period is 184 days. The forest coverage rate of Lushi County is 69.34%, the southern mountainous area exceeds 90%, and the number of days with good atmospheric environment quality reaches more than 90%.

Climate data for Lushi, elevation 659 m (2,162 ft), (1991–2020 normals, extremes 1991–present)
Month	Jan	Feb	Mar	Apr	May	Jun	Jul	Aug	Sep	Oct	Nov	Dec	Year
Record high °C (°F)	21.4 (70.5)	25.8 (78.4)	33.6 (92.5)	37.1 (98.8)	36.4 (97.5)	40.1 (104.2)	40.7 (105.3)	39.2 (102.6)	38.6 (101.5)	32.6 (90.7)	28.3 (82.9)	21.0 (69.8)	40.7 (105.3)
Mean daily maximum °C (°F)	6.3 (43.3)	9.9 (49.8)	15.7 (60.3)	22.2 (72.0)	26.2 (79.2)	30.0 (86.0)	31.4 (88.5)	29.9 (85.8)	25.2 (77.4)	20.1 (68.2)	14.0 (57.2)	8.1 (46.6)	19.9 (67.9)
Daily mean °C (°F)	−0.8 (30.6)	2.7 (36.9)	8.2 (46.8)	14.5 (58.1)	18.8 (65.8)	22.9 (73.2)	25.2 (77.4)	23.7 (74.7)	18.8 (65.8)	12.9 (55.2)	6.6 (43.9)	0.8 (33.4)	12.9 (55.2)
Mean daily minimum °C (°F)	−5.4 (22.3)	−2.3 (27.9)	2.5 (36.5)	8.1 (46.6)	12.6 (54.7)	17.1 (62.8)	20.7 (69.3)	19.6 (67.3)	14.6 (58.3)	8.2 (46.8)	1.7 (35.1)	−3.9 (25.0)	7.8 (46.1)
Record low °C (°F)	−15.6 (3.9)	−13.3 (8.1)	−10.3 (13.5)	−3.1 (26.4)	0.0 (32.0)	8.4 (47.1)	13.4 (56.1)	11.9 (53.4)	2.6 (36.7)	−4.4 (24.1)	−12.8 (9.0)	−18.8 (−1.8)	−18.8 (−1.8)
Average precipitation mm (inches)	7.0 (0.28)	11.7 (0.46)	23.1 (0.91)	39.0 (1.54)	62.1 (2.44)	77.0 (3.03)	119.7 (4.71)	103.0 (4.06)	96.9 (3.81)	50.5 (1.99)	25.1 (0.99)	5.5 (0.22)	620.6 (24.44)
Average precipitation days (≥ 0.1 mm)	4.2	5.0	7.2	7.5	9.7	9.9	12.6	12.3	10.7	9.4	5.8	3.7	98
Average snowy days	5.7	5.0	2.2	0.3	0	0	0	0	0	0	1.9	4.1	19.2
Average relative humidity (%)	62	62	60	61	66	70	77	80	80	78	72	64	69
Mean monthly sunshine hours	149.4	142.5	171.2	195.7	196.3	187.1	194.3	176.6	142.5	145.1	145.5	158.8	2,005
Percentage possible sunshine	47	46	46	50	45	44	44	43	39	42	47	52	45
Source: China Meteorological Administration all-time February high

== Economy ==
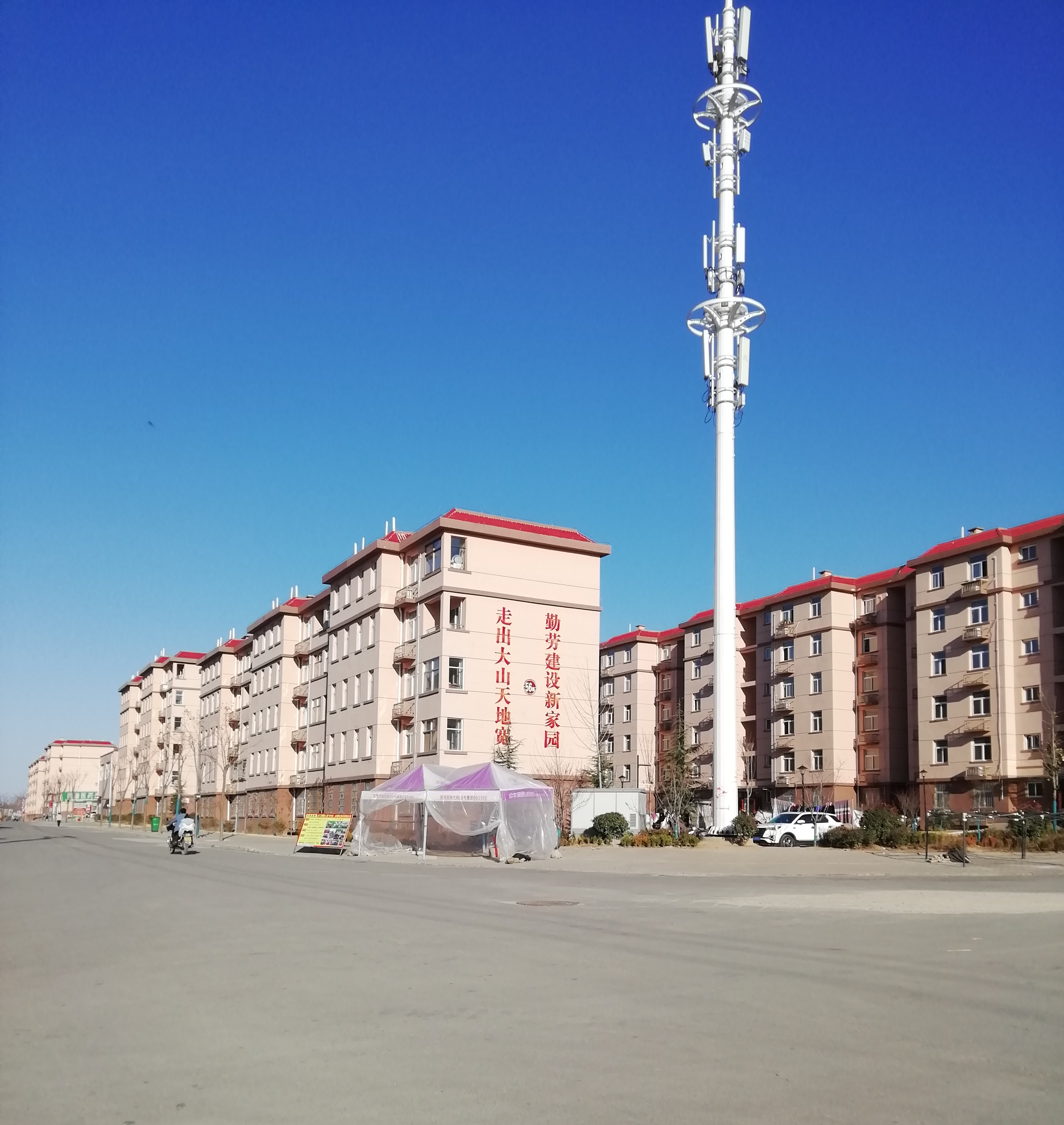

Lushi County's economy is dominated by agriculture. Edible fungi, Chinese medicinal materials, animal husbandry and under-forest economy are the pillar industries of Lushi's agriculture. It has 300 million bags of Lushi mushroom bags, 1,000,000 mu (70,000 hectares or 170,000 acres) of Lushi walnuts, 1 million mu of Lushi Forsythia serrata and more than 1,200 mu (80 ha or 200 acres) of greenhouse vegetables have won the National Edible Mushroom Industrialization Construction Demonstration County, National Export Mushroom Quality and Safety Demonstration Area, National Excellent Mushroom Export Base County, Lu's Forsythia Chinese Characteristic Agricultural Product Advantage Area, Henan Province Chinese Herbal Medicine Industry Development Ten Strong county title. Tourism is also an important economic pillar of Lushi County. In 2015, Lushi County received more than 8.54 million tourists and achieved a total tourism revenue of more than 6.17 billion yuan.

Lushi County is located in a contiguous poverty-stricken area in the Qinba Mountains. In 2016, the poverty incidence rate in the county reached 18.9%, ranking first in Henan Province. Lushi County began to carry out large-scale poverty alleviation and relocation in 2016, and as of February 2021 In January, 8,727 households with 31,353 people in Lushi County were relocated for poverty alleviation, and 55 resettlement sites were built. Among them, Xingxianli Community in Yingzi Village, Hengjian Township is the largest ex-situ poverty alleviation and relocation community in Henan Province. There are 2,757 households with 11,227 persons in 18 townships in the county. In 2020, the per capita disposable income of all residents in Lushi County is 17,195.5 yuan, the per capita disposable income of urban residents is 29,184 yuan, and the per capita disposable income of rural residents is 11,478.7 yuan. On February 26, 2020, the Henan Provincial Government approved Lushi County to withdraw from poverty-stricken counties. In March 2021, Lushi County was listed as a key county for rural revitalization in Henan Province.

In 2020, Lushi County completed a GDP of 11.93687 billion yuan, of which the primary industry was 2.78228 billion yuan, the secondary industry was 3.38671 billion yuan, and the tertiary industry was 5.76788 billion yuan. The ratio of the tertiary industry is 23.3:28.4:48.3. The county's grain planting area is 31,159.7 hectares, of which wheat accounts for 13,308 hectares, the county's grain output is 137,262 tons, and another 3,611 hectares of vegetables and 326 hectares of oil crops. In the whole year, the industrial added value of the high-tech industry was 186.55 million yuan, and the added value of the construction industry was 1,245.44 million yuan. The annual sales of goods amounted to RMB 8,035.96 million, of which the total retail sales of consumer goods was RMB 4,532,060,000, including RMB 2,531,140,000 in wholesale sales, RMB 4,481,760,000 in retail, RMB 148,570,000 in accommodation, and RMB 874,490,000 in catering.

== Transportation ==
The Haoji Railway passes through the territory of Lushi County, which is managed by the China Railway Xi'an Bureau Group. There are two freight stations at Lushi Station and Wulichuan Station. The Lingbao-Lushi section of the Sanxi Expressway and the Luoning-Lushi section of the Zhenglu Expressway were completed and opened to traffic on December 31, 2012, shortening the journey from Lushi County to Sanmenxia and Zhengzhou urban areas by half. The construction of the Luanchuan-Lushi Expressway officially started on March 22, 2019. Affected by the 2019 COVID-19 epidemic, the road freight turnover in Lushi County in 2020 was 2,024.22 million tons/km, a year-on-year decrease of 8.0%, and the road passenger turnover was 659.93 million/km, a year-on-year decrease of 35.0%. On December 27, 2021, the construction of the Lushi-Luonan Expressway started.

== Population ==
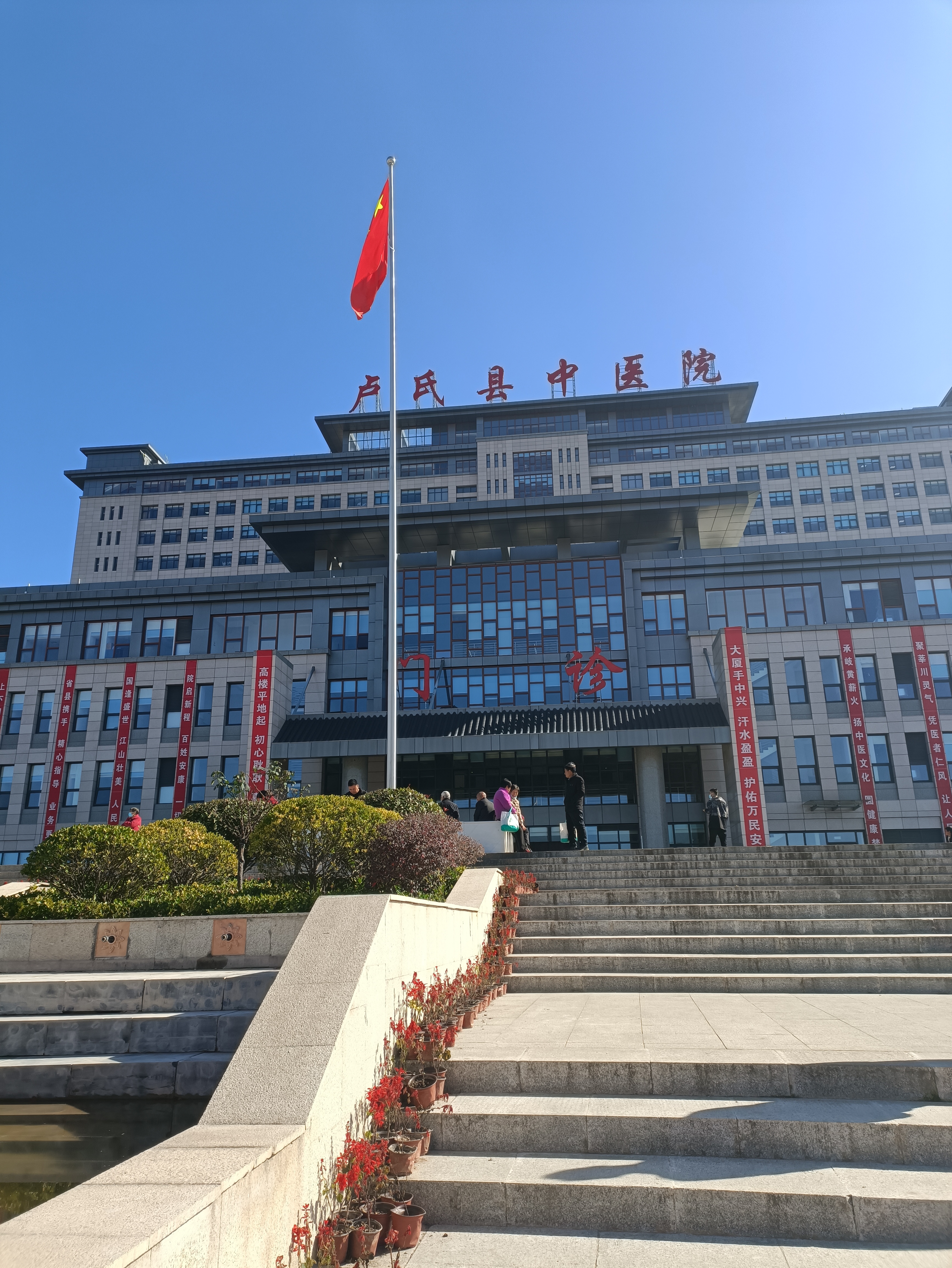

At the end of 2018, the birth rate of Lushi County was 7.7‰, the mortality rate was 5.6‰, the natural population growth rate was 2.1‰, and the urbanization rate was 40.51%. In the seventh national census in 2020, the resident population of Lushi County was 317,132, of which 51.25% were male, 48.75% were female, the sex ratio was 105.12%, 20.23% were under the age of 14, and 60.32% were aged 14–60, 19.45% were over the age of 60, of which 13.17% were over the age of 65. In addition to the Han nationality, there are 26 ethnic minorities in Lushi County, mainly Hui, Mongolian, Manchu and Tibetan, among which the Hui nationality has the largest population.

== Education ==
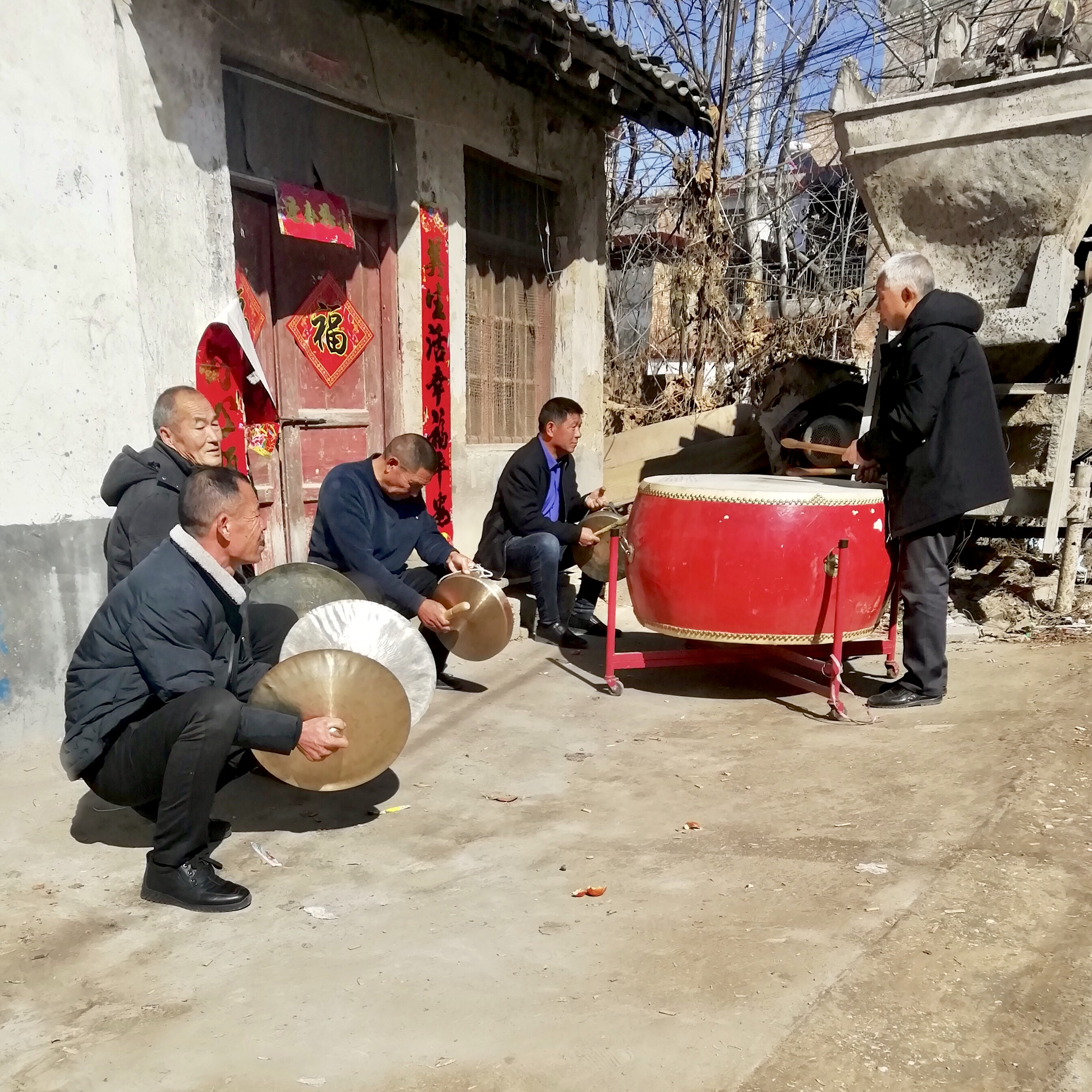

As of 2019, Lushi County has a total of 206 schools, including 25 junior high schools, 33 primary schools, 80 teaching points, one special education school, one private nine-year school, two ordinary high schools, and two vocational schools., 62 independent kindergartens. There are 58,664 students in total, including 23,215 primary school students, 14,370 middle school students, 6,557 high school students, 903 vocational college students and 13,619 kindergarten students. The county has a total of 3,700 faculty members, including 3,440 faculty members and 260 special post teachers. In 2019, the Lushi County education department invested 135 million yuan to improve 10 small-scale rural schools, build 7 township boarding schools, and renovated and expanded 17 primary and secondary schools. [54] In 2020, the average number of years of education for the population aged 15 and above in Lushi County is 9.2 years, with a college degree or above accounting for 6.664%, high school education accounting for 14.866%, junior high school education accounting for 39.944%, and primary school education accounting for 29.254%.

== Administrative divisions ==
As of 2012, this county is divided to 8 towns and 11 townships.

Towns

- Chengguan (城关镇)
- Duguan (杜关镇)
- Wulichuan (五里川镇)
- Guandaokou (官道口镇)
- Zhuyangguan (朱阳关镇)
- Guanpo (官坡镇)
- Fanli (范里镇)
- Dongming (东明镇)

Townships

- Wenyu Township (文峪乡)
- Hengjian Township (横涧乡)
- Mogoukou Township (磨沟口乡)
- Shuanghuaishu Township (双槐树乡)
- Tanghe Township (汤河乡)
- Wayaogou Township (瓦窑沟乡)
- Shiziping Township (狮子坪乡)
- Shahe Township (沙河乡)
- Xujiawan Township (徐家湾乡)
- Panhe Township (潘河乡)
- Mutong Township (木桐乡)
