= Wenfeng, Anyang =

Coordinates: 36°04′40″N 114°22′00″E

Wenfeng 文峰区
- District
- Interactive map of Wenfeng
- Country: People's Republic of China
- Province: Henan
- Prefecture-level city: Anyang

Area
  - Total: 179 km^{2} (69 sq mi)

Population (2019)
  - Total: 445,700
  - Density: 2,490/km^{2} (6,450/sq mi)
- Time zone: UTC+8 (China Standard)
- Postal code: 455000

Wenfeng District (Chinese: 文峰区; pinyin: Wénfēng Qū) is a district and the municipal seat of Anyang, Henan province, China.

== Administrative divisions ==
As of 2021, this district is divided to 12 subdistricts, 1 town and 1 township.

Subdistricts

- Beidajie Subdistrict (北大街街道)
- Dongdajie Subdistricts (东大街街道)
- Guanghualu Subdistrict (光华路街道)
- Nanguan Subdistrict (南关街道)
- Tianshuijing Subdistrict (甜水井街道)
- Tou'ersan Subdistrict (头二三街道)
- Xidajie Subdistrict (西大街街道)
- Xiguan Subdistrict (西关街道)
- Yongminglu Subdistrict (永明路街道)
- Zhonghualu Subdistrict (中华路街道)
- Ziweidadao Subdistrict (紫薇大道街道)

Towns

- Baoliansi Town (宝莲寺镇)

Townships

- Gaozhuang Township (高庄乡)

== Notable events ==
- 2022 Anyang factory fire (in Baoliansi Town, Wenfeng District, Anyang)
