= Nanle County =

Coordinates: 36°04′57″N 115°12′21″E

Nanle County 南乐县 Nanlo
- County
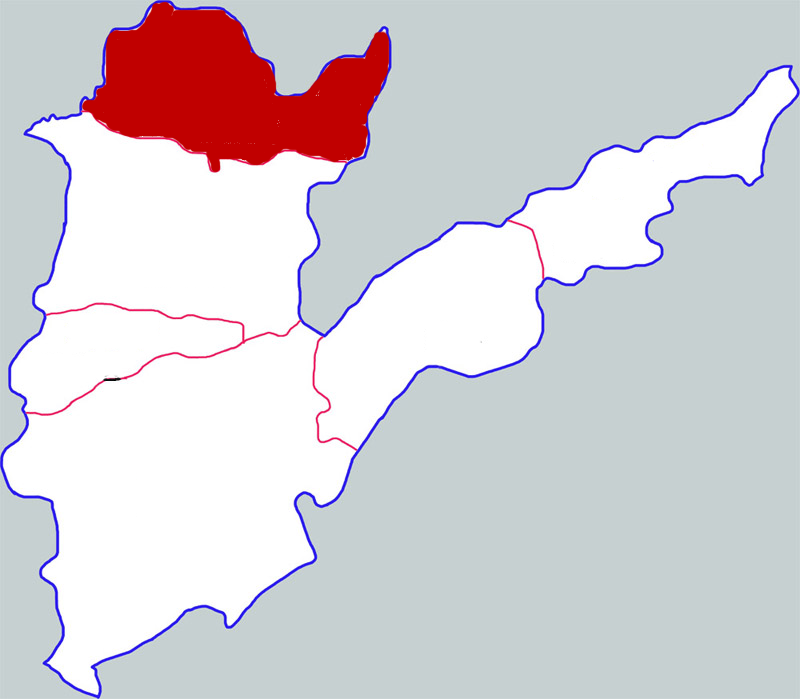
- Nanle County in Puyang

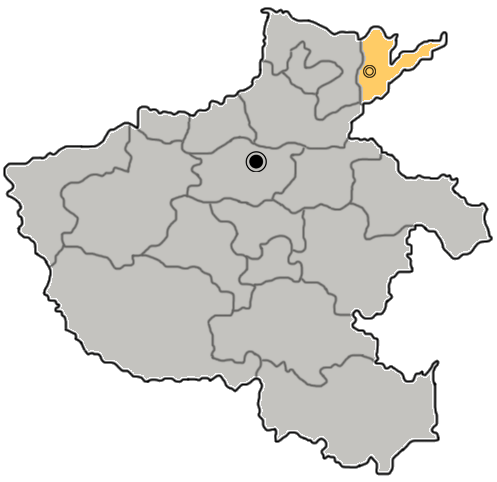
- Puyang in Henan
- Country: People's Republic of China
- Province: Henan
- Prefecture-level city: Puyang

Area
  - Total: 623 km^{2} (241 sq mi)

Population (2019)
  - Total: 458,900
  - Density: 737/km^{2} (1,910/sq mi)
- Time zone: UTC+8 (China Standard)
- Postal code: 457400

Nanle County (simplified Chinese: 南乐县; traditional Chinese: 南樂縣; pinyin: Nánlè Xiàn) is a county in the north of Henan province, China, bordering the provinces of Hebei and Shandong to the north and east, respectively. It is the northernmost county-level division of Puyang City.

== Administrative divisions ==
As of 2012, this county is divided to 4 towns and 8 townships.

Towns

- Chengguan (城关镇)
- Hanzhang (韩张镇)
- Yuancun (元村镇)
- Fukan (福堪镇)

Townships

- Yangcun Township (杨村乡)
- Zhangguotun Township (张果屯乡)
- Qiankou Township (千口乡)
- Gujinlou Township (谷金楼乡)
- Xishao Township (西邵乡)
- Sizhuang Township (寺庄乡)
- Liangcun Township (梁村乡)
- Jindegu Township (近德固乡)

== Climate ==
Climate data for Nanle, elevation 47 m (154 ft), (1991–2020 normals, extremes 1961–2010)
Month	Jan	Feb	Mar	Apr	May	Jun	Jul	Aug	Sep	Oct	Nov	Dec	Year
Record high °C (°F)	17.5 (63.5)	23.9 (75.0)	27.7 (81.9)	34.0 (93.2)	37.1 (98.8)	42.6 (108.7)	43.1 (109.6)	39.3 (102.7)	37.5 (99.5)	34.8 (94.6)	27.4 (81.3)	22.4 (72.3)	43.1 (109.6)
Mean daily maximum °C (°F)	4.0 (39.2)	8.0 (46.4)	15.3 (59.5)	21.0 (69.8)	26.7 (80.1)	32.4 (90.3)	32.0 (89.6)	30.3 (86.5)	27.0 (80.6)	21.6 (70.9)	13.0 (55.4)	5.8 (42.4)	19.8 (67.6)
Daily mean °C (°F)	−1.4 (29.5)	2.2 (36.0)	8.9 (48.0)	14.8 (58.6)	20.6 (69.1)	26.1 (79.0)	27.1 (80.8)	25.4 (77.7)	20.9 (69.6)	15.3 (59.5)	7.3 (45.1)	0.4 (32.7)	14.0 (57.1)
Mean daily minimum °C (°F)	−5.6 (21.9)	−2.2 (28.0)	3.5 (38.3)	9.0 (48.2)	14.8 (58.6)	20.3 (68.5)	23.1 (73.6)	21.7 (71.1)	16.2 (61.2)	10.3 (50.5)	2.7 (36.9)	−3.9 (25.0)	9.2 (48.5)
Record low °C (°F)	−20.6 (−5.1)	−16.8 (1.8)	−13.2 (8.2)	−3.6 (25.5)	2.0 (35.6)	8.5 (47.3)	15.6 (60.1)	11.1 (52.0)	2.9 (37.2)	−2.3 (27.9)	−19.0 (−2.2)	−21.0 (−5.8)	−21.0 (−5.8)
Average precipitation mm (inches)	4.9 (0.19)	8.2 (0.32)	12.4 (0.49)	30.2 (1.19)	48.1 (1.89)	63.0 (2.48)	161.3 (6.35)	133.9 (5.27)	52.5 (2.07)	29.7 (1.17)	19.5 (0.77)	5.7 (0.22)	569.4 (22.41)
Average precipitation days (≥ 0.1 mm)	2.2	3.5	3.6	5.1	6.1	7.4	10.7	9.5	7.2	5.7	4.4	2.6	68
Average snowy days	2.5	2.5	0.7	0.2	0	0	0	0	0	0	0.8	2.2	8.9
Average relative humidity (%)	63	59	58	65	67	61	77	82	76	68	68	66	68
Mean monthly sunshine hours	140.9	151.4	202.1	224.4	248.7	226.1	190.0	190.3	180.1	178.8	148.8	142.2	2,223.8
Percentage possible sunshine	45	49	54	57	57	52	43	46	49	52	49	47	50
Source: China Meteorological Administration
