= Neihuang County =

Neihuang County 内黄县 Neihwang
- County
- Location of the seat in Henan
- Coordinates: 35°58′19″N 114°54′04″E
- Country: People's Republic of China
- Province: Henan
- Prefecture-level city: Anyang

Area
  - Total: 1,146 km^{2} (442 sq mi)

Population (2019)
  - Total: 667,100
  - Density: 582.1/km^{2} (1,508/sq mi)
- Time zone: UTC+8 (China Standard)
- Postal code: 456350

Neihuang County (simplified Chinese: 内黄县; traditional Chinese: 內黃縣; pinyin: Nèihuáng Xiàn) is a county in the north of Henan province, China, bordering Hebei province to the north. It is under the administration of Anyang city.

== Administrative divisions ==
As of 2012, this county is divided to 7 towns and 10 townships.

Towns

- Chengguan (城关镇)
- Chuwang (楚旺镇)
- Dongzhuang (东庄镇)
- Houhe (后河镇)
- Jingdian (井店镇)
- Liangzhuang (梁庄镇)
- Tianshi (田氏镇)

Townships

- Bocheng Township (亳城乡)
- Dougong Township (豆公乡)
- Er'an Township (二安乡)
- Gaodi Township (高堤乡)
- Liucun Township (六村乡)
- Mashang Township (马上乡)
- Shipantun Township (石盘屯乡)
- Songcun Township (宋村乡)
- Zhanglong Township (张龙乡)
- Zhongzhao Township (中召乡)

== Climate ==
Climate data for Neihuang, elevation 52 m (171 ft), (1991–2020 normals, extremes 1981–2010)
Month	Jan	Feb	Mar	Apr	May	Jun	Jul	Aug	Sep	Oct	Nov	Dec	Year
Record high °C (°F)	17.5 (63.5)	25.5 (77.9)	28.4 (83.1)	34.3 (93.7)	36.4 (97.5)	41.8 (107.2)	41.2 (106.2)	36.7 (98.1)	37.4 (99.3)	35.0 (95.0)	27.9 (82.2)	21.8 (71.2)	41.8 (107.2)
Mean daily maximum °C (°F)	4.3 (39.7)	8.7 (47.7)	15.0 (59.0)	21.3 (70.3)	26.9 (80.4)	32.1 (89.8)	32.0 (89.6)	30.5 (86.9)	27.1 (80.8)	21.6 (70.9)	13.0 (55.4)	6.1 (43.0)	19.9 (67.8)
Daily mean °C (°F)	−1.3 (29.7)	2.6 (36.7)	8.7 (47.7)	15.1 (59.2)	20.7 (69.3)	25.8 (78.4)	27.1 (80.8)	25.5 (77.9)	20.8 (69.4)	14.9 (58.8)	7.0 (44.6)	0.6 (33.1)	14.0 (57.1)
Mean daily minimum °C (°F)	−5.6 (21.9)	−2.2 (28.0)	3.3 (37.9)	9.3 (48.7)	14.8 (58.6)	20.1 (68.2)	23.0 (73.4)	21.6 (70.9)	16.1 (61.0)	9.6 (49.3)	2.2 (36.0)	−3.7 (25.3)	9.0 (48.3)
Record low °C (°F)	−20.8 (−5.4)	−16.0 (3.2)	−8.4 (16.9)	−1.2 (29.8)	2.5 (36.5)	11.3 (52.3)	16.2 (61.2)	11.8 (53.2)	3.9 (39.0)	−1.7 (28.9)	−18.5 (−1.3)	−16.9 (1.6)	−20.8 (−5.4)
Average precipitation mm (inches)	4.9 (0.19)	8.3 (0.33)	12.8 (0.50)	30.0 (1.18)	46.5 (1.83)	61.8 (2.43)	156.6 (6.17)	129.0 (5.08)	55.9 (2.20)	28.6 (1.13)	22.3 (0.88)	5.8 (0.23)	562.5 (22.15)
Average precipitation days (≥ 0.1 mm)	2.4	3.4	3.4	4.9	6.1	7.5	10.8	9.5	6.9	5.3	4.6	2.5	67.3
Average snowy days	3.2	2.7	0.8	0.3	0	0	0	0	0	0	1.0	2.3	10.3
Average relative humidity (%)	63	60	58	64	67	64	79	83	78	71	70	67	69
Mean monthly sunshine hours	114.4	129.6	182.5	209.7	234.1	208.8	173.2	176.1	159.9	154.7	130.6	121.5	1,995.1
Percentage possible sunshine	37	42	49	53	54	48	39	43	43	45	43	40	45
Source: China Meteorological Administration
