= G36 Nanjing–Luoyang Expressway =

Road in China

Nanjing–Luoyang Expressway
- 南京－洛阳高速公路
- Jingluo Expressway 宁洛高速公路

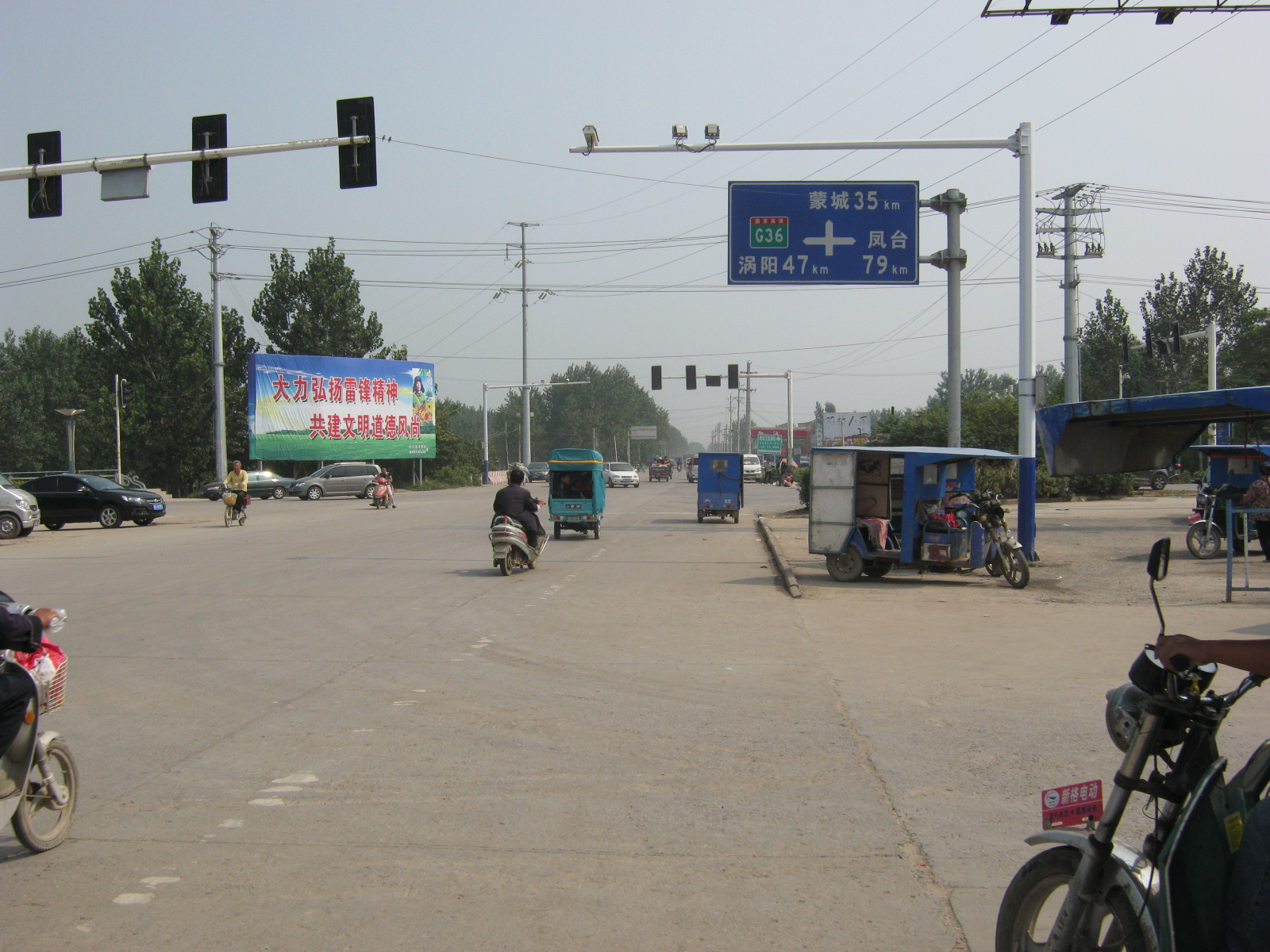
- An entrance to the Nanjing–Luoyang Expressway in Lixin County, Bozhou.

Route information
- Length: 1,354.7 km (841.8 mi)
- Existed: 30 September 2006–present

Major junctions
- East end: G25 / G42 / G2501 in Nanjing, Jiangsu
- West end: G30 in Luoyang, Henan

Location
- Country: China

Highway system
- National Trunk Highway System; Primary; Auxiliary; National Highways; Transport in China
← G3512	→ G3611

The Nanjing–Luoyang Expressway (Chinese: 南京—洛阳高速公路), designated as G36 and commonly referred to as the Ningluo Expressway (Chinese: 宁洛高速公路) is an expressway that connects the cities of Nanjing, Jiangsu, China, and Luoyang, Henan. It is 1,354.7 km (841.8 mi) in length.

The expressway was fully completed on 30 September 2006. It passes through the following cities:

- Nanjing, Jiangsu
- Bengbu, Anhui
- Fuyang, Anhui
- Zhoukou, Henan
- Pingdingshan, Henan
- Luoyang, Henan
