= Anyang County =

Anyang County 安阳县
- County
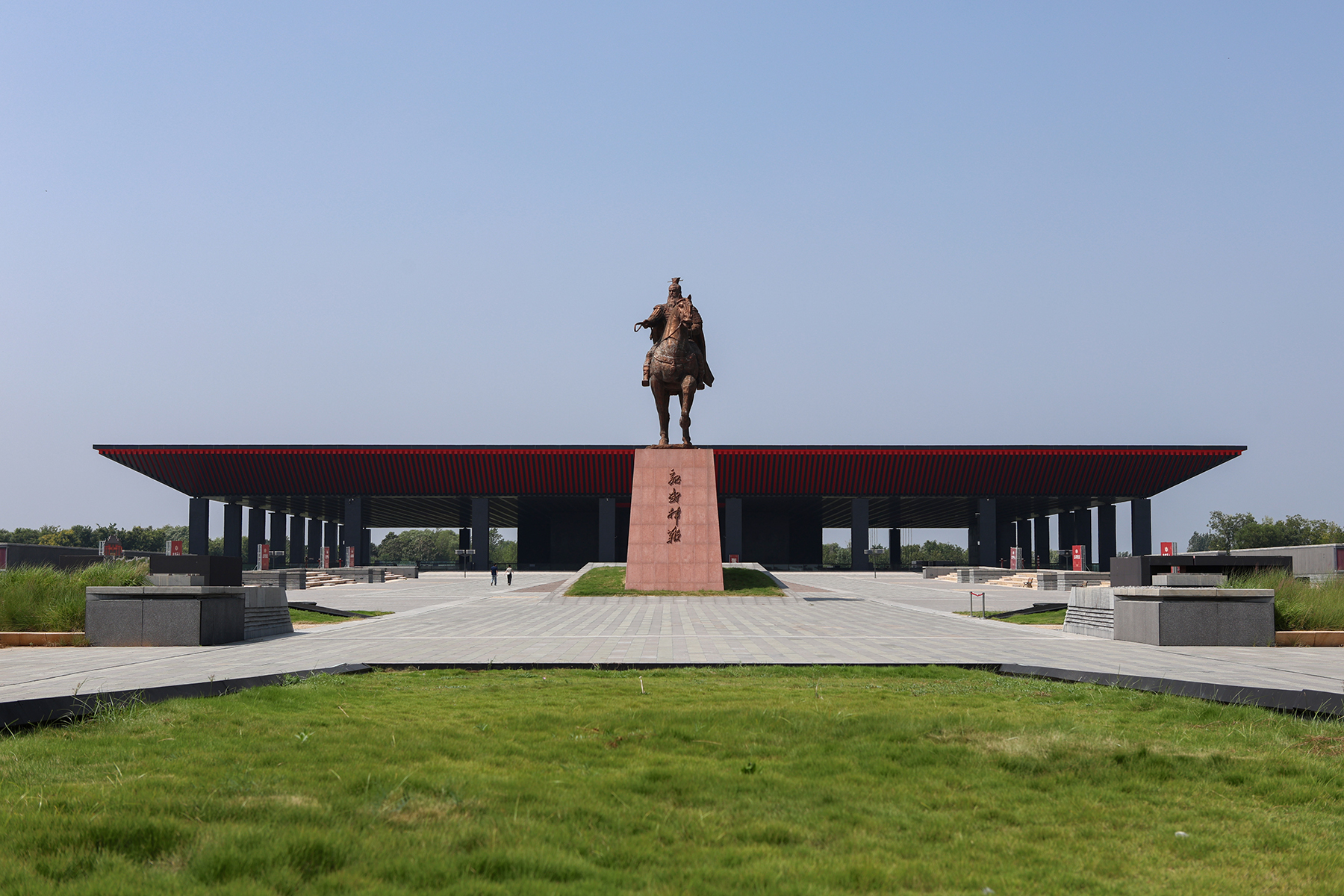
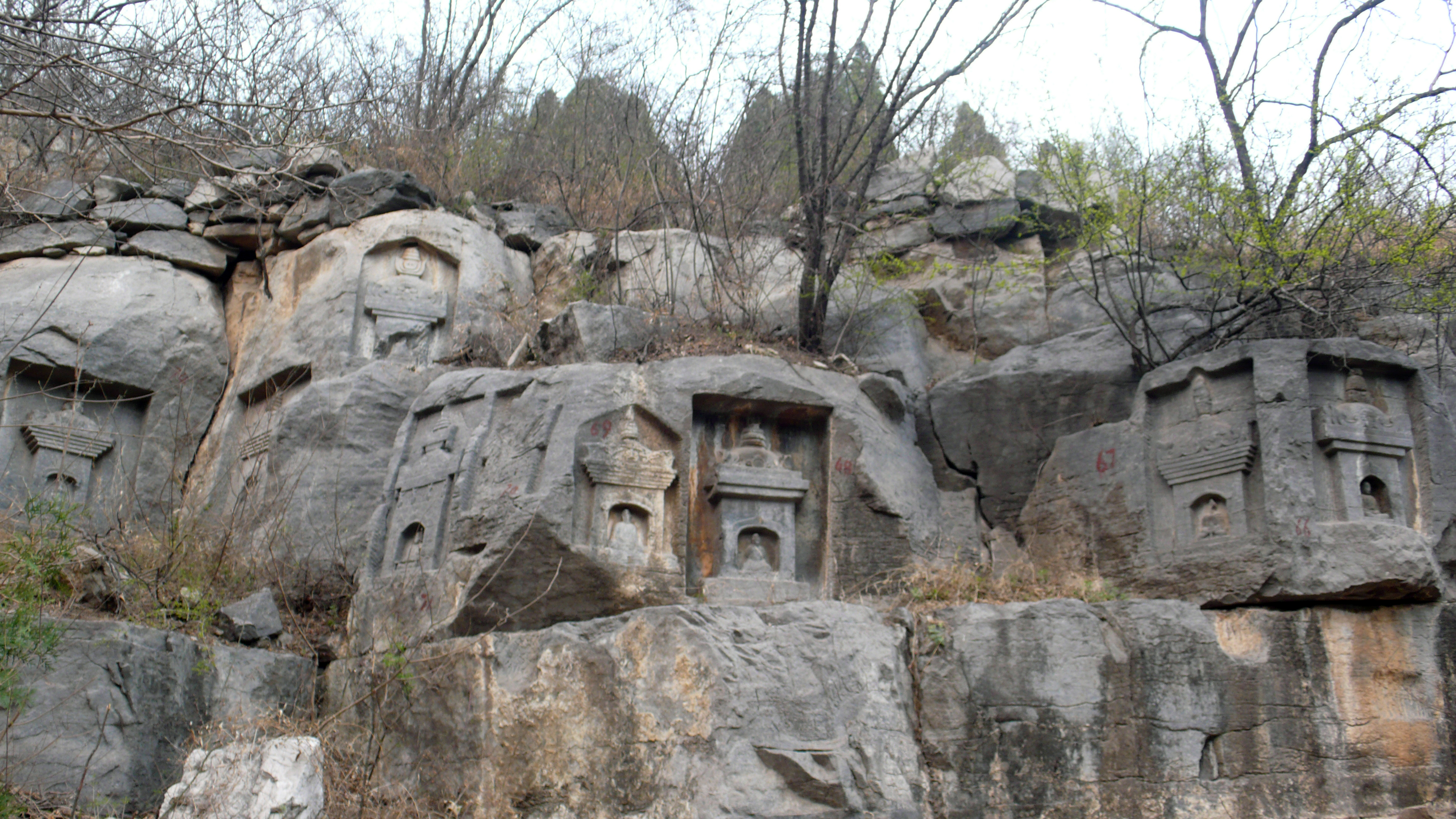
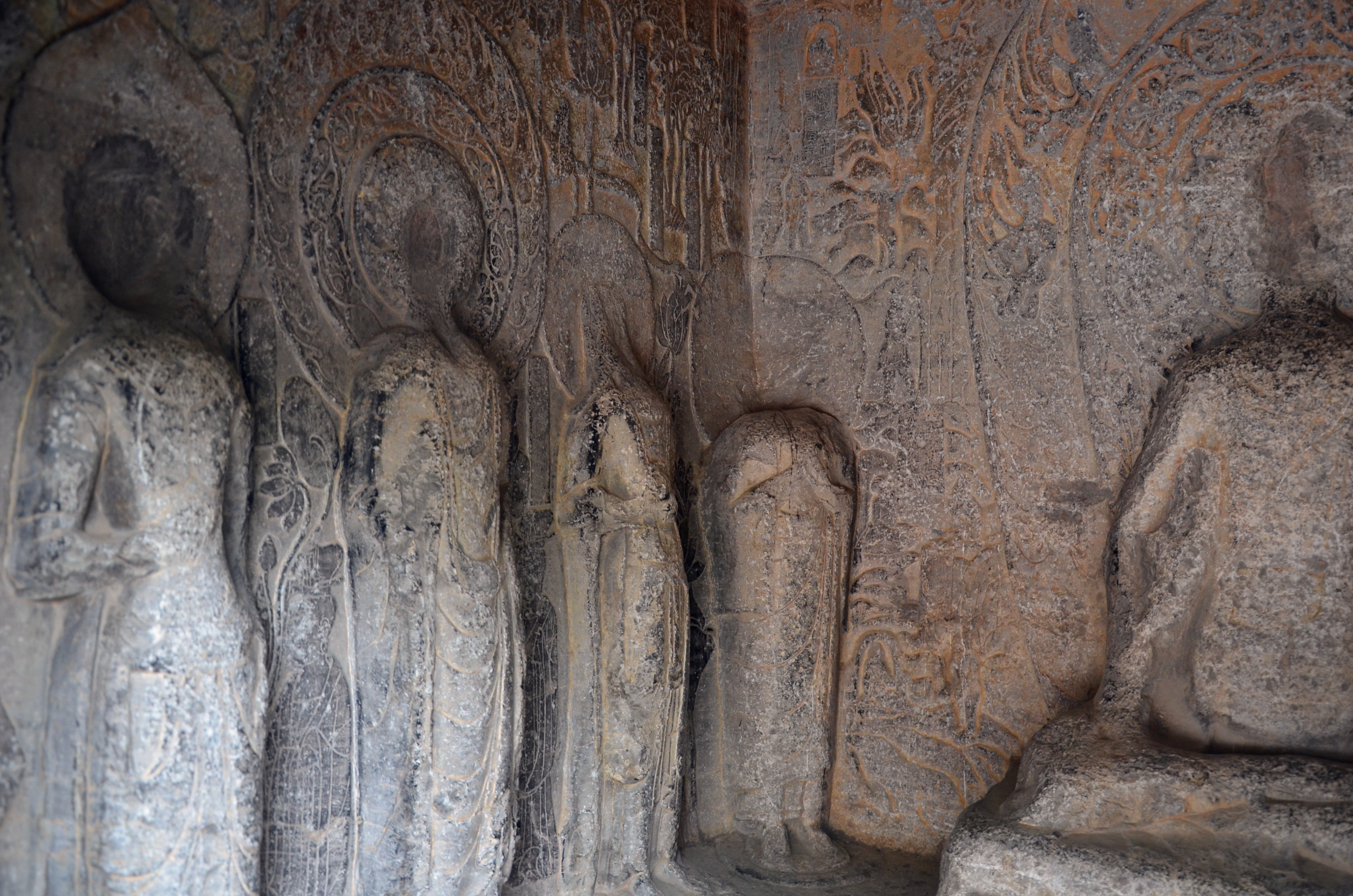
- Cao Cao Mausoleum Lingquan Temple Grottoes Xiaonanhai Grottoes

- Location in Henan
- Country: People's Republic of China
- Province: Henan
- Prefecture-level city: Anyang

Area
  - Total: 1,196 km^{2} (462 sq mi)

Population (2019)
  - Total: 844,700
  - Density: 706.3/km^{2} (1,829/sq mi)
- Time zone: UTC+8 (China Standard)
- Postal code: 455100

Anyang County (simplified Chinese: 安阳县; traditional Chinese: 安陽縣; pinyin: Ānyáng Xiàn) is a county in the north of Henan province, China. It is under the administration of Anyang city.

== History ==
Anyang County's existence was first attested during the Warring States period and under the Qin dynasty. The county seat during this period was a place located south of present-day Anyang city. Anyang County was abolished under the Western Han, but brought back under the Western Jin. The location of the county seat during this period is not listed. The county was then abolished again under the Eastern Wei. It was then reconstituted under the Sui dynasty in 590 CE and has existed continuously ever since. The present-day city of Anyang was made county seat c. 607, and has held that role continuously until the present day.

== Administrative divisions ==
As of 2012, this county is divided to 8 towns and 13 townships.

Towns

- Baibi (白壁镇)
- Baizhuang (柏庄镇)
- Cuijiaqiao (崔家桥镇)
- Lücun (吕村镇)
- Qugou (曲沟镇)
- Shanying (善应镇)
- Shuiye (水冶镇)
- Tongye (铜冶镇)

Townships

- Anfeng Township (安丰乡)
- Beiguo Township (北郭乡)
- Duli Township (都里乡)
- Hanling Township (韩陵乡)
- Honghetun Township (洪河屯乡)
- Jiangcun Township (蒋村乡)
- Leikou Township (磊口乡)
- Lunzhang Township (伦掌乡)
- Majia Township (马家乡)
- Wadian Township (瓦店乡)
- Xincun Township (辛村乡)
- Xujiagou Township (许家沟乡)
- Yonghe Township (永和乡)
