= G4 Beijing–Hong Kong and Macau Expressway =

Expressway in Beijing, Hebei, Henan, Hubei, Hunan, Guangdong and Hong Kong of China

Beijing–Hong Kong and Macau Expressway
- 北京－港澳高速公路
- Jinggang'ao Expressway 京港澳高速
- The Beijing–Hong Kong and Macau Expressway is highlighted in red.

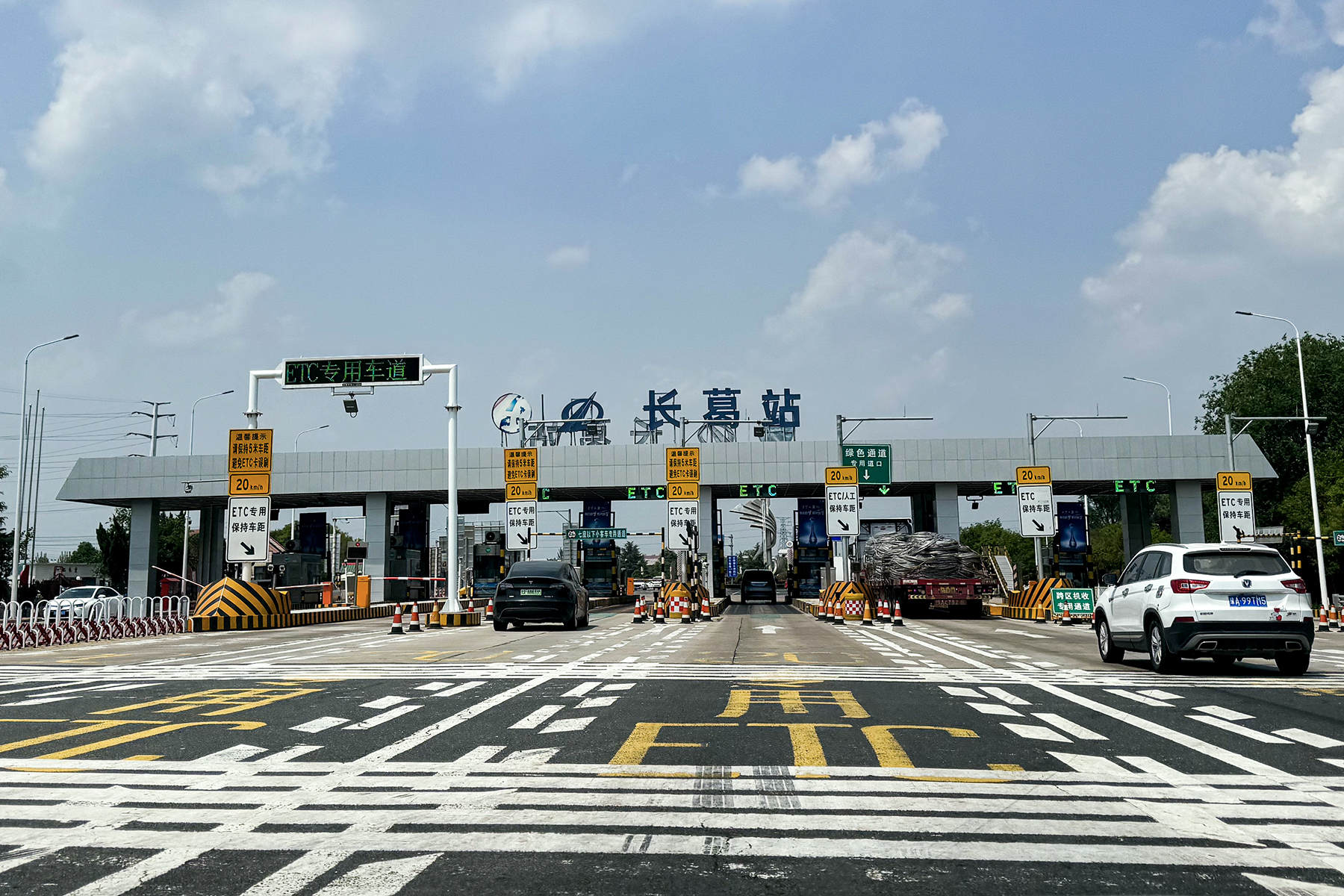
- Changge Toll Gate of G4 Expressway

Route information
- Part of AH1
- Length: 2,272.65 km (1,412.16 mi)

Major junctions
- North end: Liuli Bridge, West 3rd Ring Road, Beijing
- G4501 in Beijing G95 in Baoding, Hebei; G18 in Baoding, Hebei; G1812 in Baoding, Hebei; G1811 in Shijiazhuang, Hebei; G20 in Shijiazhuang, Hebei; G2516 in Xingtai, Hebei; G22 in Handan, Hebei; G5512 in Xinxiang, Henan; G30 in Zhengzhou, Henan; G3001 in Zhengzhou, Henan; G0421 / G1516 in Xuchang, Henan; G36 in Luohe, Henan; G40 in Xinyang, Henan; G70 in Xiaogan, Hubei; G42 in Wuhan, Hubei; G4201 in Wuhan, Hubei; G0422 in Wuhan, Hubei; G50 in Wuhan, Hubei; G0422 in Xianning, Hubei; G56 in Yueyang, Hunan; G0401 in Changsha, Hunan; G60 in Xiangtan, Hunan; G72 in Hengyang, Hunan; G76 in Chenzhou, Hunan; G0423 in Shaoguan, Guangdong; G6011 in Shaoguan, Guangdong; G45 / G94 in Guangzhou, Guangdong; G15 in Guangzhou, Guangdong; G35 in Guangzhou, Guangdong; G0425 in Guangzhou, Guangdong; G9411 in Dongguan, Guangdong G15 in Shenzhen, Guangdong
- South end: Huanggang Road, Huanggang Port Control Point, Shenzhen, Guangdong (and through it, Route 9)

Location
- Country: China

Highway system
- National Trunk Highway System; Primary; Auxiliary; National Highways; Transport in China
| ← G0323 | → G0401 |

Beijing-Hong Kong and Macau Expressway
- Traditional Chinese: 北京－港澳高速公路
- Simplified Chinese: 北京－港澳高速公路
Transcriptions
Standard Mandarin
- Hanyu Pinyin: Běijīng-Gǎng'ào gāosùgōnglù
- Wade–Giles: Pei^{3}-ching^{1}-Hsiang^{1}ao^{4} Kao^{1}-su^{4}-kung^{1}-lu^{4}
Yue: Cantonese
- Jyutping: Baak1 ging1-Gong2 ou3 gou1 cuk1 gung1 lou6

Jinggang'ao Expressway
- Chinese: 京港澳高速公路
Transcriptions
Standard Mandarin
- Hanyu Pinyin: Jīnggǎng'ào gāosùgōnglù
- Wade–Giles: Ching^{1}-kang^{3}-ao^{4} Kao^{1}-su^{4}-kung^{1}-lu^{4}
Yue: Cantonese
- Jyutping: Ging1 gong2 ou3 gou1 cuk1 gung1 lou6

The Beijing–Hong Kong and Macau Expressway (Chinese: 北京－港澳高速公路), designated as G4 and commonly referred to as the Jinggang'ao Expressway (Chinese: 京港澳高速公路) is a 2,272.65 km (1,412.16 mi)-long expressway that connects the Chinese cities of Beijing and Shenzhen, in Guangdong province, at the border of Hong Kong. The expressway terminates at the Huanggang Port Control Point in Shenzhen, opposite the Lok Ma Chau border control point in Hong Kong.

== Route ==
=== Beijing ===
The expressway begins at the interchange with the southwestern section of 3rd Ring Road, known as Liuheqiao Bridge, in Beijing. At first it heads west, passing through the 4th Ring Road at Yuegezhuang, and then approaches a heavily industrialized area, the Xidaokou area near Shougang. On the way out of Beijing the expressway passes through the famous Luguoqiao area, home of the Marco Polo Bridge and Wanping, marking where the Second Sino-Japanese War began in 1937. The expressway also links Beijing to the Zhoukoudian Peking Man cave, as well as Yunju Temple.

The expressway is free of charge in Beijing urban area, and then becomes tolled after Dujiakan Toll Station. The expressway then heads south, passing through Liangxiang in Fangshan, before leaving Beijing near Liulihe.

=== Hebei ===
- Baoding
- Shijiazhuang
- Xingtai
- Handan

=== Henan ===
- Anyang
- Xinxiang
- Zhengzhou
- Xuchang
- Luohe
- Zhumadian
- Xinyang

=== Hubei ===
G4 Jinggang’ao Expressway in Hubei Province

- Xiaogan
- Wuhan
- Xianning

=== Hunan ===
- Yueyang
- Changsha
- Zhuzhou
- Hengyang
- Chenzhou

=== Guangdong ===
- Shaoguan
- Guangzhou
- Shenzhen

The expressway ends at Huanggang Port, Shenzhen, connected with the road to Hong Kong.

== History ==
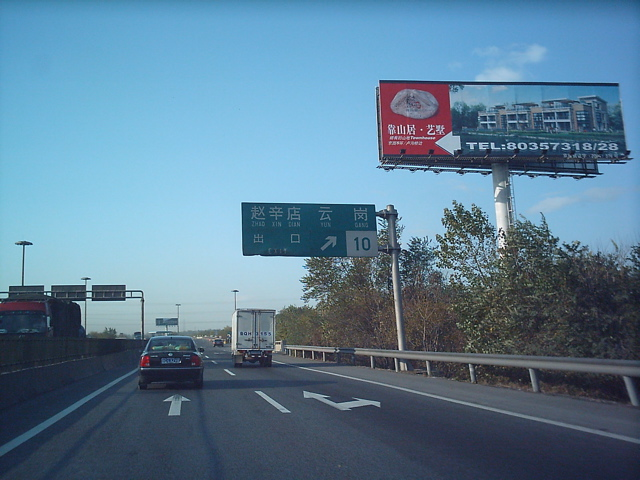
A section of G4 Expressway in Fengtai District of Beijing in 2004

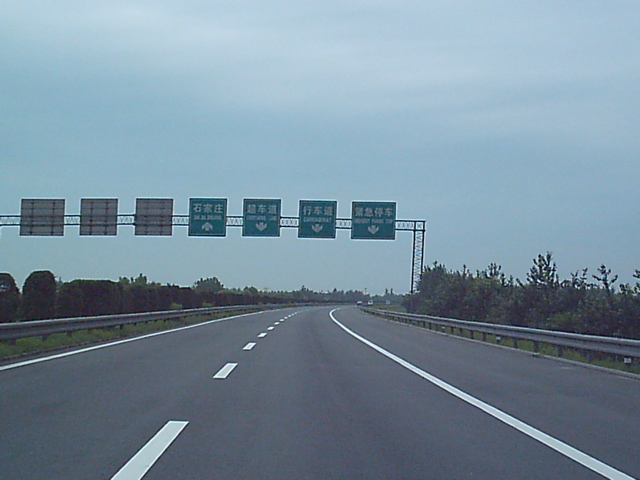
A section of G4 Expressway in Hebei in 2004

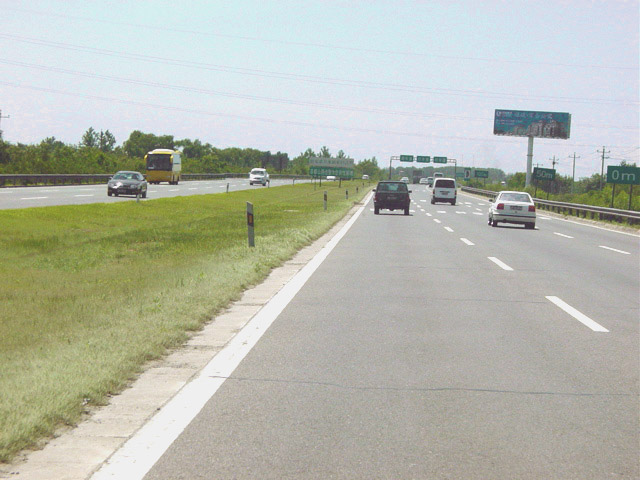
G4 Expressway near the Zhaoxindian/Changxindian exit in 2004

The expressway began as the Jingshi Expressway linking Beijing to Shijiazhuang, Hebei. Construction of this 270 km (168 mi) section began in April 1986 and was opened in full in November 1996. This first section was previously numbered G030.

== Exit list ==
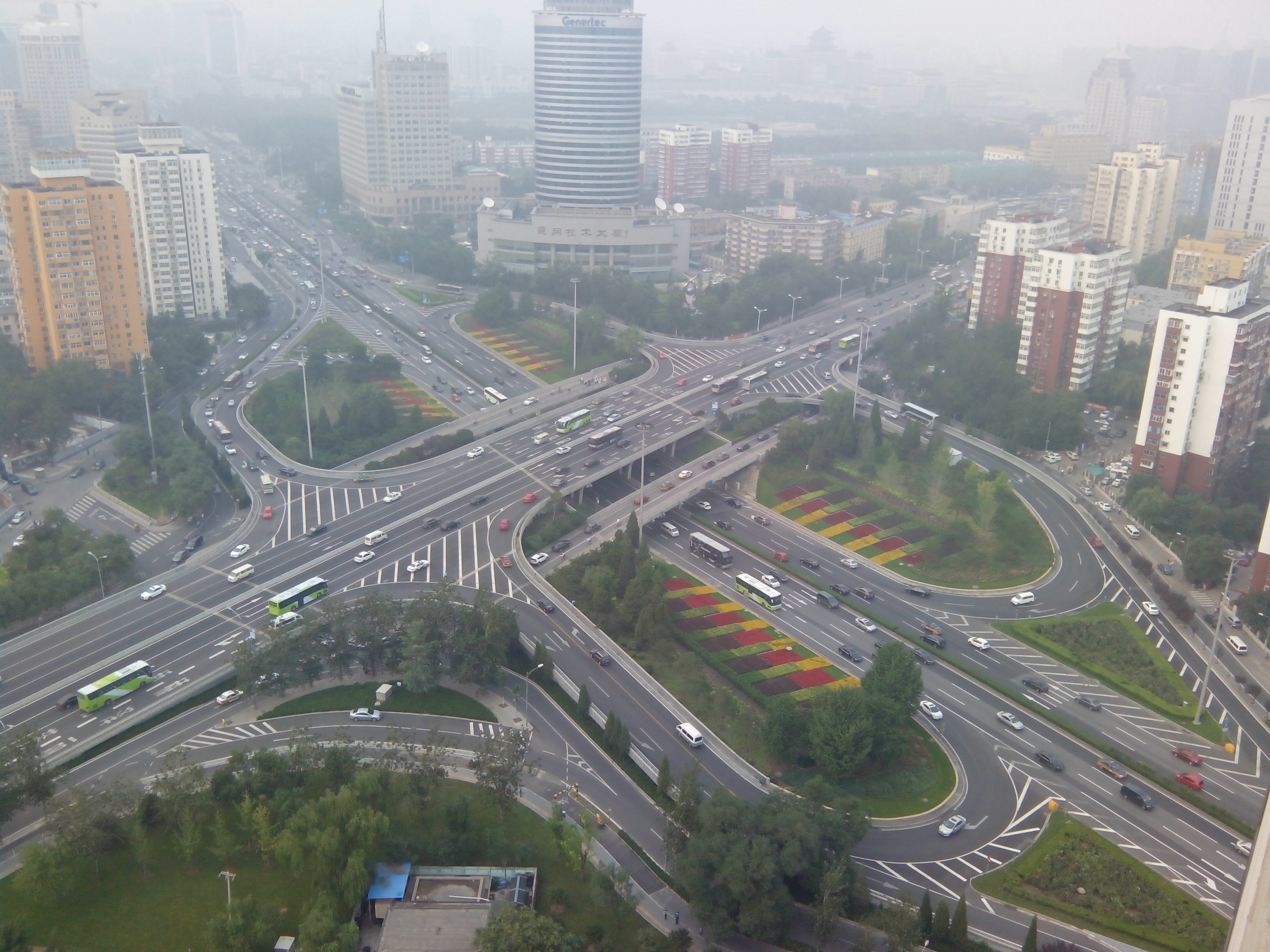
An aerial view of Liuliqiao Bridge, the starting point of G4 expressway

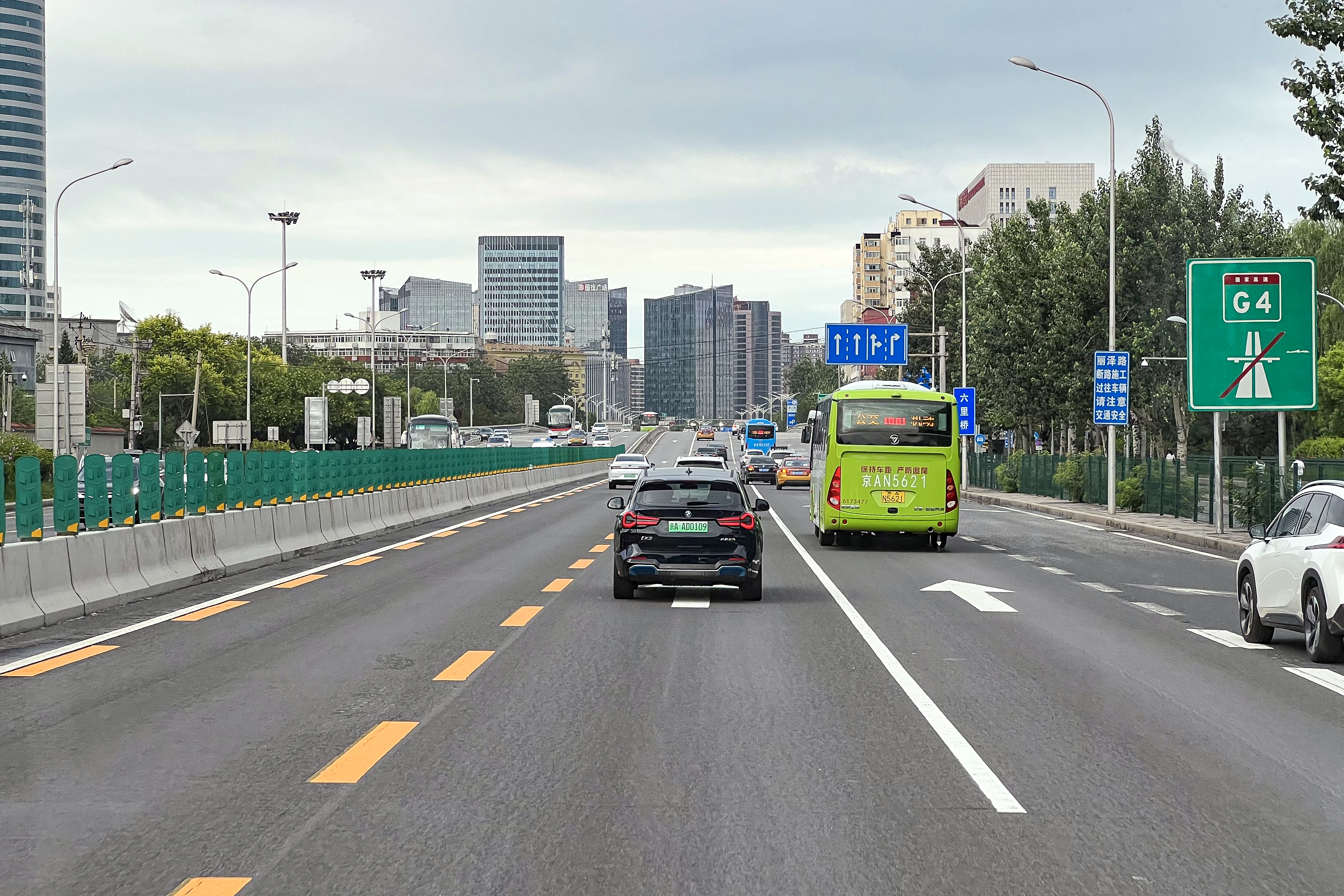
Northern end of G4 at Liuliqiao

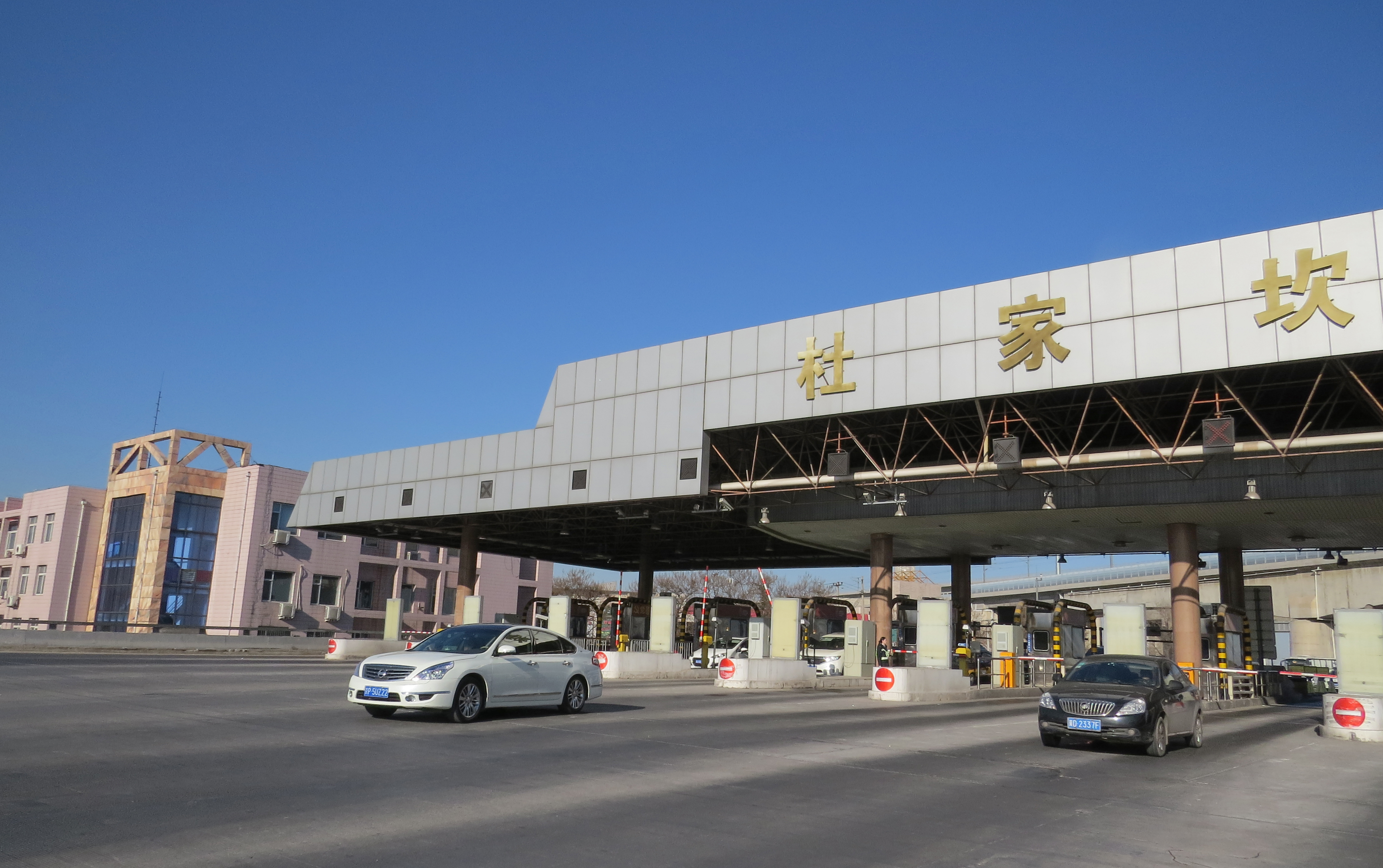
Dujiakan Toll Station in Beijing

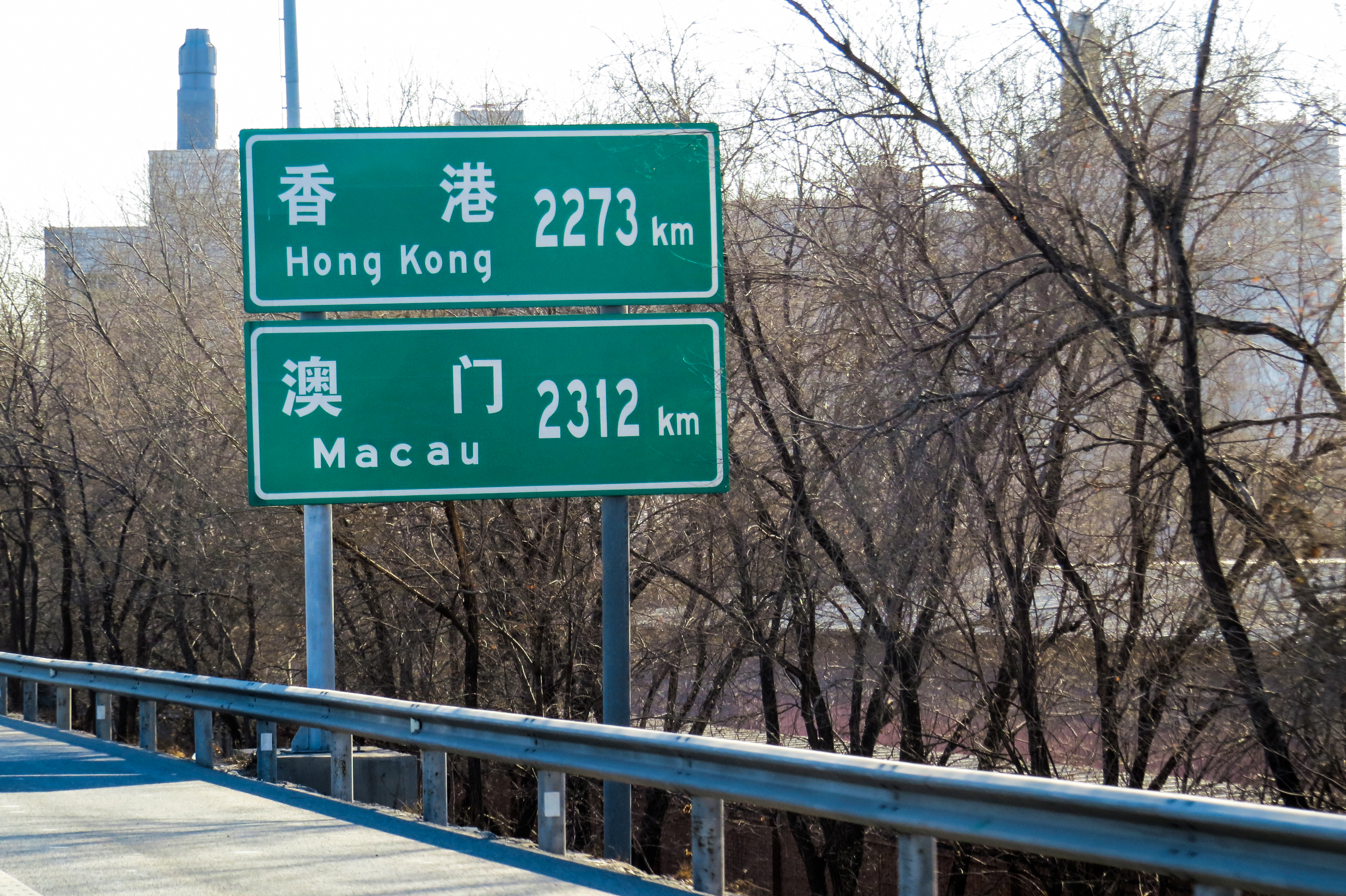
Distance sign to HK and Macau at Dujiakan, Beijing

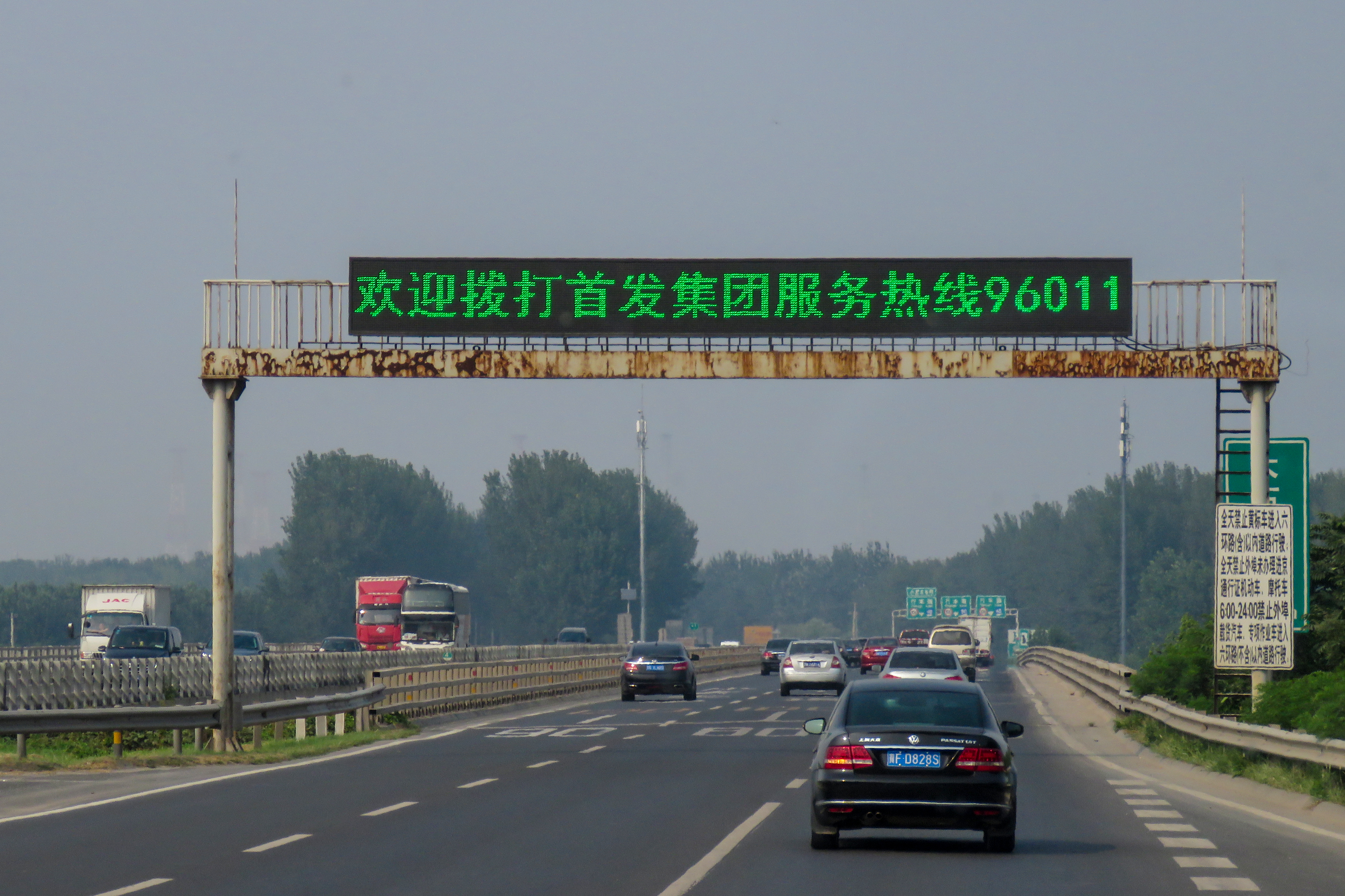
Beijing section of G4 Expressway (near Liulihe)

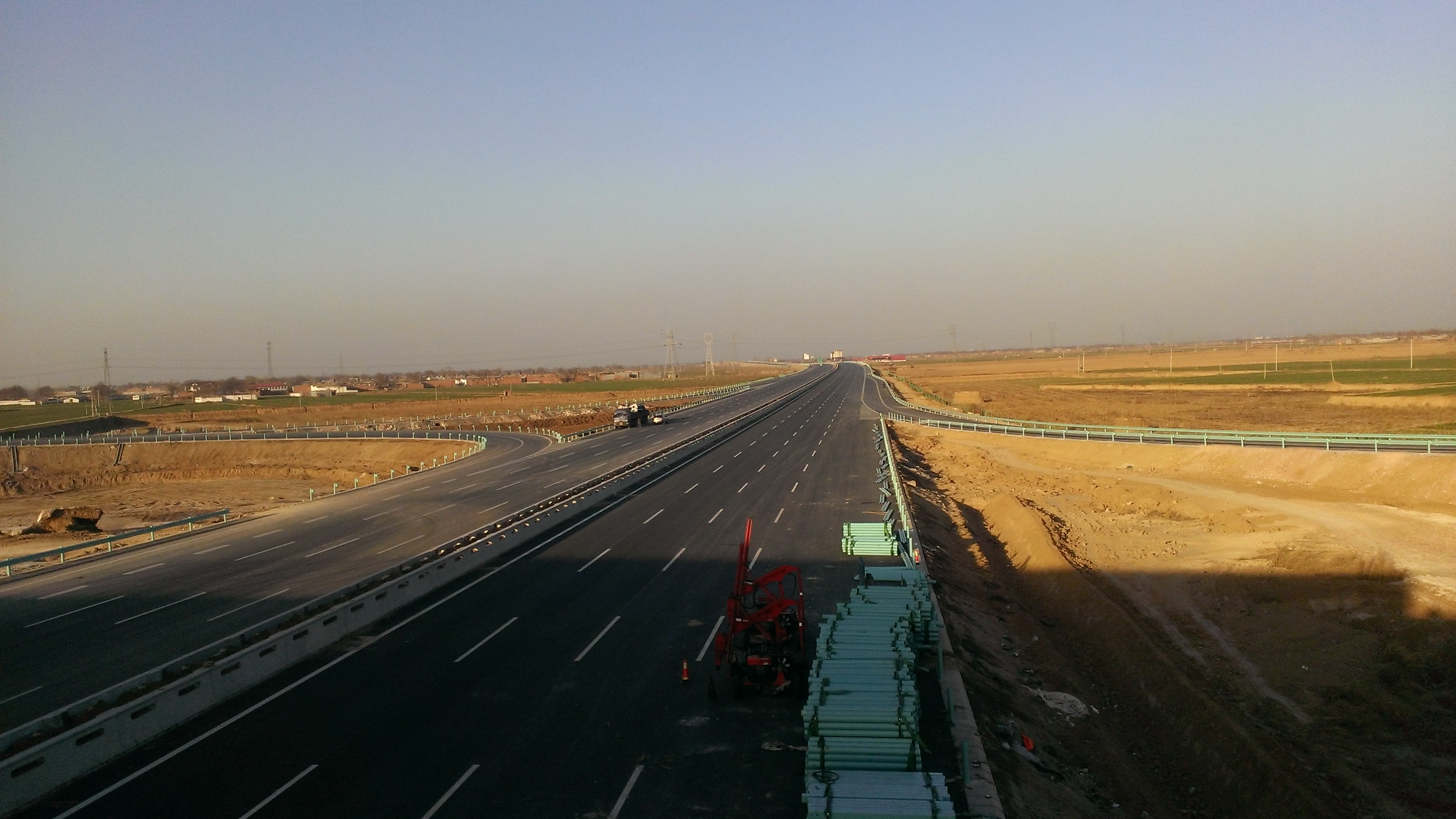
A section of G4 Expressway in Hebei under widening in 2014

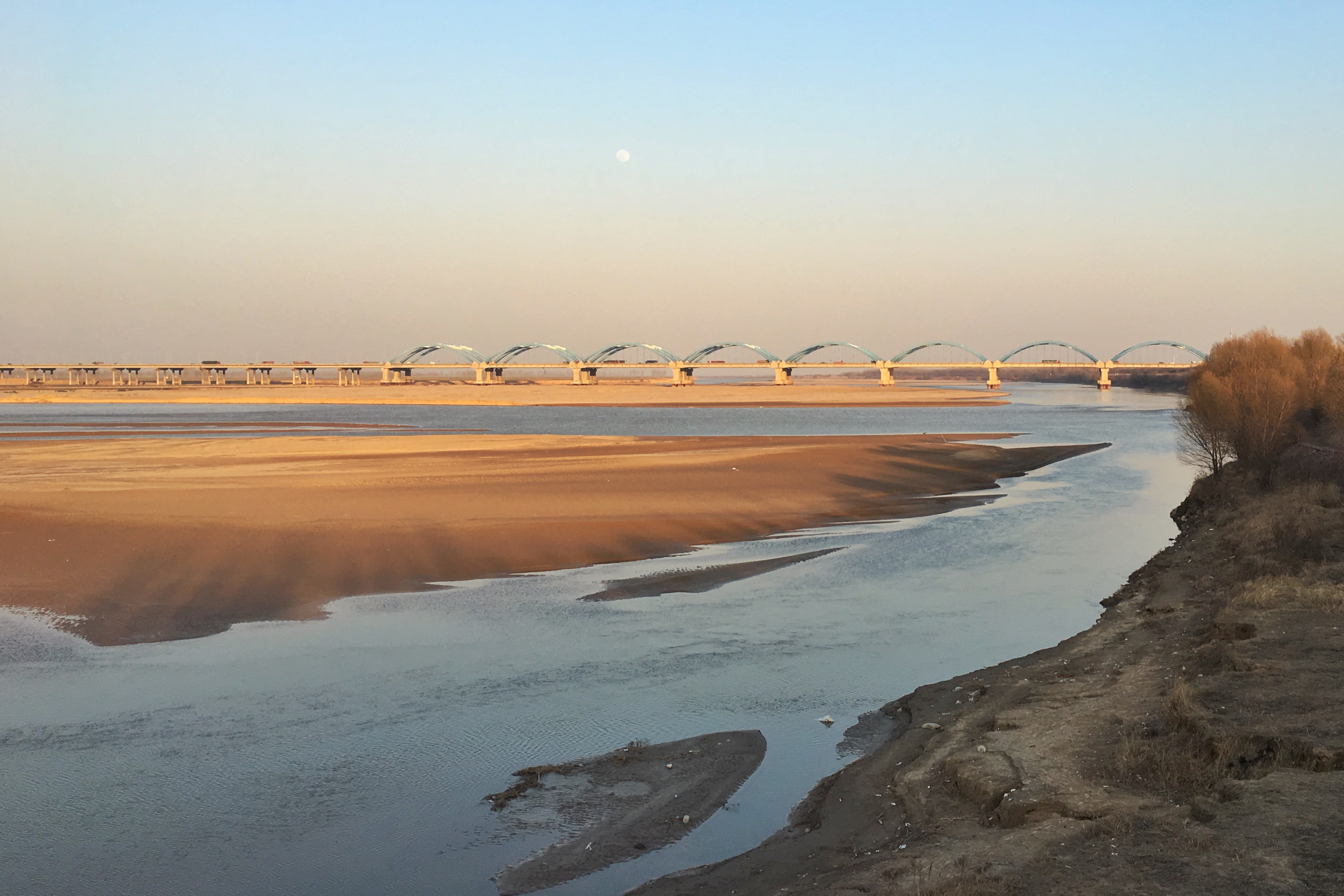
Liujiang Yellow River Bridge

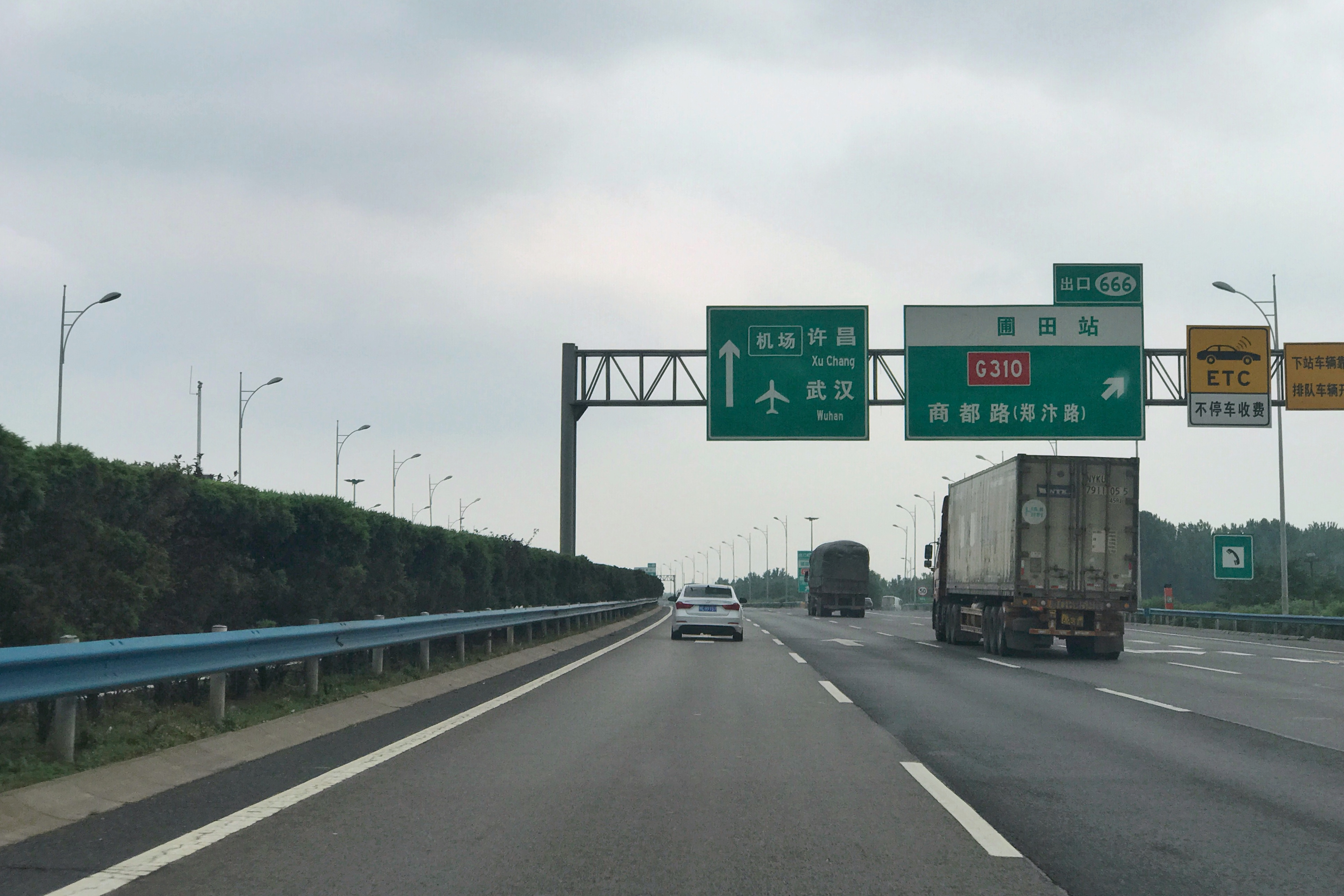
G4 Expressway near Zhengzhou, Henan

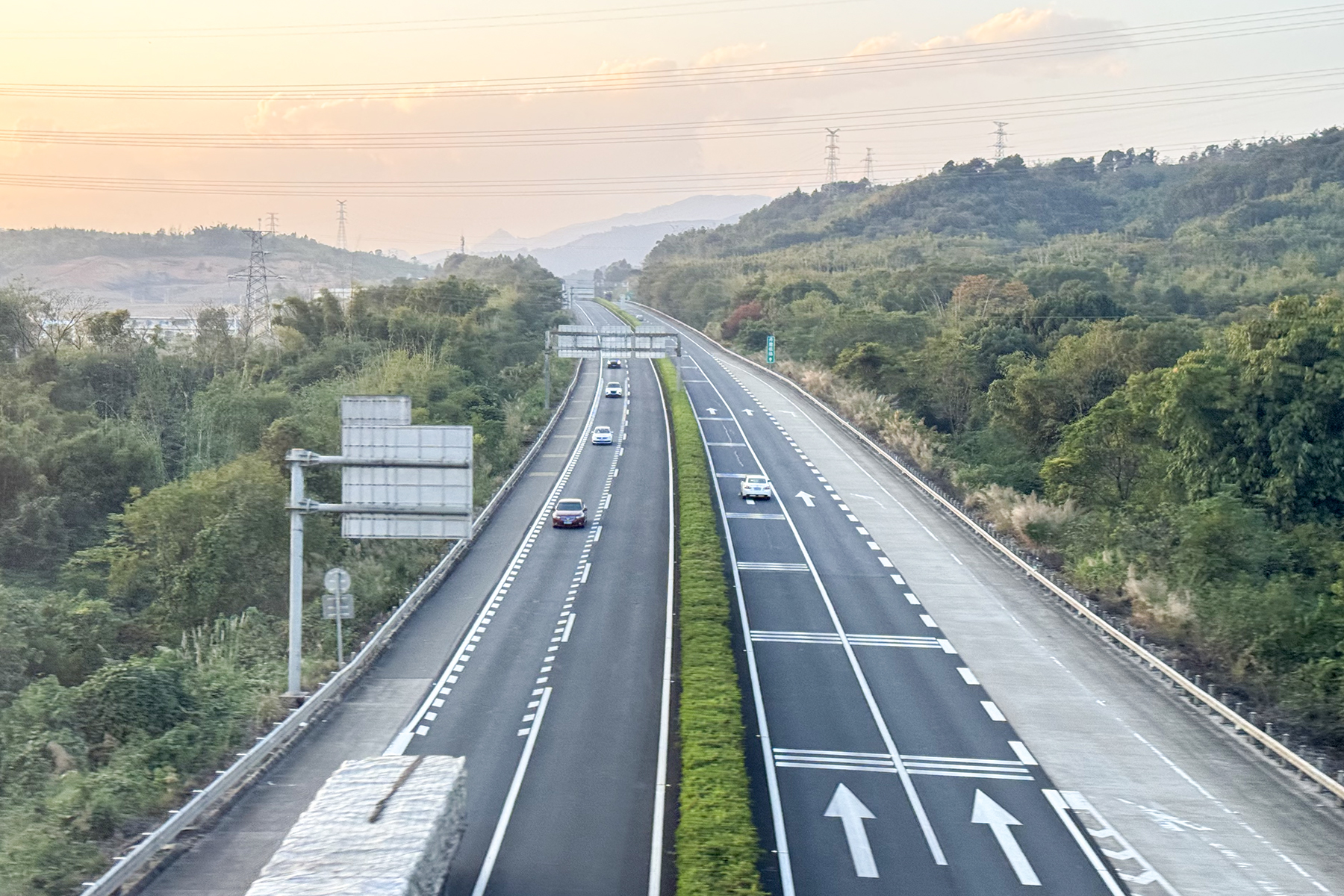
G4 Expressway near Shaoguan, Guangdong

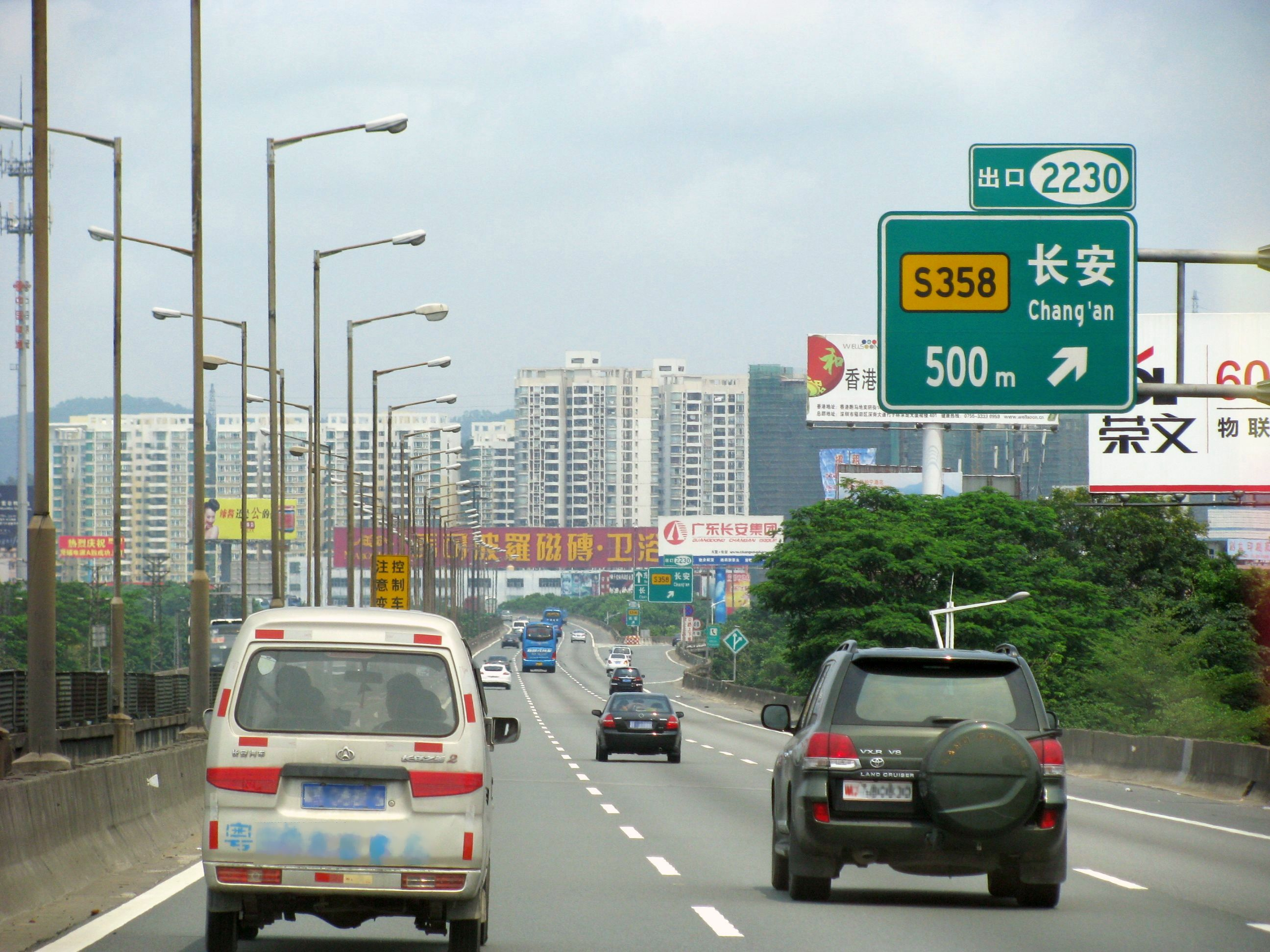
Guangzhou–Shenzhen section of G4 Expressway (Guangshen Expressway)

| Location | km | mi | Exit | Name | Destinations | Notes |
G4 (Beijing–Hong Kong–Macau Expressway)
Continues east as Guang'an Road
| Fengtai District, Beijing | 0 | 0 | 0 A-B | W. 3rd Ring Rd. | West 3rd Ring Road | |
| Fengtai District, Beijing | 0 | 0 | 0 C | Side Rd. | Side Road at the expressway | |
| Fengtai District, Beijing | 1 | 0.62 | 1 | Wanfeng Rd. | Wanfeng Road | |
| Fengtai District, Beijing | 3 | 1.9 | 3 A-B | W. 4th Ring Rd. | West 4th Ring Road | |
| Fengtai District, Beijing | | | 3 C | Side Road at W. 4th Ring Rd. | Side Road at West 4th Ring Road | Eastbound exit only |
| Fengtai District, Beijing | | | 4 A | Qingta West Rd. | Qingta West Road | |
| Fengtai District, Beijing | | | 4 B | Fengbei Rd. | Fengti South Road – Fengtai | Eastbound exit and westbound entrance only |
| Fengtai District, Beijing | | | 6 | Xidaokou | Zhangyicun Road | Westbound exit only |
| Fengtai District, Beijing | | | 8 | 5th Ring Road | Beijing S50 (5th Ring Road); Marco Polo Bridge; Museum of the War of Chinese People's Resistance Against Japanese Aggression | |
| Fengtai District, Beijing | | | 10 | Dujiakan | G107 (Zhoukoudian Road and Lugouqiao South Road) – Dujiakan, Changxindian; Yuanbo Avenue – Beijing Garden-Expo Park | |
| Fengtai District, Beijing | Dujiakan Toll Station | | | | | |
| Fengtai District, Beijing | | | 13 | Zhaoxindian | G107 (Zhoukoudian Road) | |
| Fangshan District, Beijing | | | 19 | Jingliang | Beijing S315 (Jingliang Highway) | |
| Fangshan District, Beijing | | | 22 | Liangxiang | Beijing S328 – Liangxiang, Liangxiang Airport | |
| Fangshan District, Beijing | | | 27 | Yancun | Beijing S317 (Jingzhou Highway) / Beijing S326 (Dajian Highway) – Yancun, Liangxiang | |
| Fangshan District, Beijing | | | 29 | W. 6th Ring Rd, S. 6th Ring Road | G4501 (6th Ring Road) | |
| Fangshan District, Beijing | | | 32 | Jinxiu Rd. | Jinxiu Road | Southbound exit only |
| Fangshan District, Beijing | | | 35 | Doudian | G107 – Doudian | |
| Fangshan District, Beijing | Doudian Service Area | | | | | |
| Fangshan District, Beijing | | | 42 | Liulihe | X021 (Liutao Highway) – Liulihe | |
| Zhuozhou, Baoding, Hebei | | | 47 | Matou International Health City | G107 / X005 (Yingshicheng Road) – TV and Film Center | |
| Zhuozhou, Baoding, Hebei | Beijing South Toll Station | | | | | |
| Zhuozhou, Baoding, Hebei | | | 50 | North Zhuozhou | Huatian Road | |
| Zhuozhou, Baoding, Hebei | | | 55 | Zhuozhou | Hebei S371 – Zhuozhou | |
| Zhuozhou, Baoding, Hebei | Zhuozhou Service Area | | | | | |
| Zhuozhou, Baoding, Hebei | | | 66 | G95 – Laishui, Langfang | | |
| Gaobeidian, Baoding, Hebei | | | 72 | North Gaobeidian | Y034 – Gaobeidian | |
| Gaobeidian, Baoding, Hebei | | | 77 | Gaobeidian | G112 – Gaobeidian | |
| Dingxing County, Baoding, Hebei | Dingxing Service Area | | | | | |
| Dingxing County, Baoding, Hebei | | | 92 | Dingxing | G107 – Dingxing | |
| Xushui District, Baoding, Hebei | | | 113 | Xushui, Rongcheng | Hebei S333 – Xushui | |
| Xushui District, Baoding, Hebei | | | 115 | G18 – Shuozhou, Tianjin, Baiyangdian | | |
| Xushui District, Baoding, Hebei | Xushui Service Area | | | | | |
| Qingyuan District, Baoding, Hebei | | | 131 | North Baoding | G107 – Zhili Governor's Office, Mancheng | |
| Lianchi District, Baoding, Hebei | | | 135 | Baoding | Qiyi Road – Baoding | |
| Lianchi District, Baoding, Hebei | | | 144 | South Baoding | Hebei S331 – Gaoyang | |
| Qingyuan District, Baoding, Hebei | | | 147 | G1812 – Cangzhou, Fuping | | |
| Qingyuan District, Baoding, Hebei | Baoding Service Area | | | | | |
| Qingyuan District, Baoding, Hebei | | | | Qingyuan | Chaoyang South Road – Qingyuan | |
| Wangdu County, Baoding, Hebei | Wangdu Service Area | | | | | |
| Wangdu County, Baoding, Hebei | | | | Wangdu | Hebei S032 – Wangdu | |
| Dingzhou, Baoding, Hebei | | | | Quyang–Huanghuagang Expressway | | Under construction |
| Dingzhou, Baoding, Hebei | | | | Dingzhou | G107 – Dingzhou | |
| Dingzhou, Baoding, Hebei | | | | South Dingzhou | Hebei S234 – Dingzhou | |
| Dingzhou, Baoding, Hebei | Dingzhou Service Area | | | | | |
| Xinle, Shijiazhuang, Hebei | | | 254 | Hebei S9902 – Shijiazhuang, Xinle, Zhengding | | Southbound exit and northbound entrance |
| Xinle, Shijiazhuang, Hebei | | | | East Xinle | Hebei S204 – Xinle | |
| Gaocheng District, Shijiazhuang, Hebei | | | | Airport East | Hebei S204 / Hebei S303 – Shijiazhuang Zhengding International Airport | |
| Gaocheng District, Shijiazhuang, Hebei | North Gaocheng Service Area | | | | | |
| Gaocheng District, Shijiazhuang, Hebei | | | | North Gaocheng | Hebei S302 – Zhengding, Wuji | |
| Gaocheng District, Shijiazhuang, Hebei | | | 269 | G1811 – Shijiazhuang, Huanghua | | |
| Gaocheng District, Shijiazhuang, Hebei | | | 272 | Shiji Avenue | Shiji Avenue– Development Zone, Gaocheng | |
| Gaocheng District, Shijiazhuang, Hebei | Gaocheng Service Area | | | | | |
| Gaocheng District, Shijiazhuang, Hebei | | | | Shijiazhuang–Hengshui Expressway | | Under construction |
| Luancheng District, Shijiazhuang, Hebei | | | | East Luancheng | Hebei S392 – Luancheng | |
| Luancheng District, Shijiazhuang, Hebei | | | | G20 – Shijiazhuang, Zhaoxian | | |
| Zhao County, Shijiazhuang, Hebei | | | | West Zhaoxian | Hebei S033 – Zhaoxian, Yuanshi, Beiwangli | |
| Zhao County, Shijiazhuang, Hebei | Zhaoxian Service Area | | | | | |
| Zhao County, Shijiazhuang, Hebei | | | | Hebei S9902 – Shijiazhuang | | Northbound exit and southbound entrance |
| Gaoyi County, Shijiazhuang, Hebei | | | | Gaoyi | Hebei S393 – Gaoyi | |
| Baixiang County, Xingtai, Hebei | | | | Baixiang | Hebei S034 / G107 – Baixiang, Lincheng | |
| Baixiang County, Xingtai, Hebei | Baixiang Service Area | | | | | |
| Longyao County, Xingtai, Hebei | | | | Longyao | Hebei S327 – Longyao, Yincun Town | |
| Neiqiu County, Xingtai, Hebei | | | | Neiqiu | Hebei S328 – Neiqiu, Longyao | |
| Ren County, Xingtai, Hebei | | | | Hebei S30 – Xingtai, Hengshui | | |
| Xingtai County, Xingtai, Hebei | Xingtai Service Area | | | | | |
| Xingtai County, Xingtai, Hebei | | | | North Xingtai | Hebei S324 (Xingzhou Avenue) / G107 – Xingtai | |
| Xingtai County, Xingtai, Hebei | | | 383 | Xingtai | G107 – Xingtai | |
| Xingtai County, Xingtai, Hebei | | | 388 | South Xingtai | G107 / G2516 – Xingtai, Linqing (for southbound traffic) | |
| Xingtai County, Xingtai, Hebei | | | 390 | G2516 – Fenyang, Linqing (for northbound traffic) | | |
| Shahe, Xingtai, Hebei | | | | Shahe | Hebei S329 – Shahe | |
| Shahe, Xingtai, Hebei | Shahe Service Area | | | | | |
| Yongnian District, Handan, Hebei | | | | Yongnian | Hebei S036 – Yongnian | |
| Congtai District, Handan, Hebei | | | | G22 – Shexian, Guantao | | |
| Congtai District, Handan, Hebei | | | | Handan | Hebei S311 – Handan | |
| Hanshan District, Handan, Hebei | Handan Service Area | | | | | |
| Hanshan District, Handan, Hebei | | | | South Handan | Hebei S313 – Handan | |
| Hanshan District, Handan, Hebei | | | | Ji'nan New Area | Hebei S315 | |
| Hanshan District, Handan, Hebei | | | | Handan Ring Expressway | | |
| Ci County, Handan, Hebei | Cixian Service Area | | | | | |
| Ci County, Handan, Hebei | | | 467 | Cixian, Linzhang | Hebei S316 – Cixian, Linzhang | |
| Linzhang County, Handan, Hebei | | | | Yecheng | Yecheng Museum | |
| Linzhang County, Handan, Hebei | Jiyujie Toll Station | | | | | |
| Anyang County, Anyang, Henan | Yujijie Service Area | | | | | |
| Anyang County, Anyang, Henan | | | | Henan S91 | | Under construction |
| Beiguan District, Anyang, Henan | 497.6 | 309.2 | | North Anyang | Henan S301 – Anyang | |
| Wenfeng District, Anyang, Henan | 504.4 | 313.4 | | Anyang | Henan S303 – Anyang | |
| Wenfeng District, Anyang, Henan | | | | Henan S22 – Nanle, Linzhou, Henan | | |
| Wenfeng District, Anyang, Henan | Anyang Service Area | | | | | |
| Tangyin County, Anyang, Henan | 518.8 | 322.4 | | South Anyang (Tangyin) | Henan S302 – Tangyin | |
| Qibin District, Hebi, Henan | 539.2 | 335.0 | 539 | Hebi | Qibin Avenue – Hebi; Henan S26 – Puyang | |
| Qibin District, Hebi, Henan | 545.8 | 339.1 | | Xunxian | Henan S305 – Hebi, Xunxian | |
| Qi County, Hebi, Henan | 557 | 346 | 557 | Qixian | Yunmeng Avenue – Qixian | |
| Qi County, Hebi, Henan | Hebi Service Area | | | | | |
| Weihui, Xinxiang, Henan | 585.4 | 363.8 | 585 | Weihui | Henan S101 – Weihui | |
| Weihui, Xinxiang, Henan | | | 596 A-B | G3511 (currently designated as G5512 / Henan S28) – Jiaozuo, Changyuan | | |
| Hongqi District, Xinxiang, Henan | 601.9 | 374.0 | 601 A 601 B | Xinxiang | Jinsui Avenue – Downtown Xinxiang; Henan S308 – Yanjin | |
| Xinxiang County, Xinxiang, Henan | Xinxiang Service Area | | | | | |
| Yuanyang County, Xinxiang, Henan | 628.4 | 390.5 | 628 | Yuanyang | Huanghe Avenue – Yuanyang | |
| Yuanyang County, Xinxiang, Henan | Yuanyang Service Area | | | | | |
| Yuanyang County, Xinxiang, Henan | | | 639 | G5512 (currently designated as Henan S86) – Jiaozuo, Jincheng | | |
| Jinshui District, Zhengzhou, Henan | | | 657A-B | Liujiang Interchange | G30 / G3001 – Kaifeng, Luoyang, other destinations in Zhengzhou | Northern terminus of G3001 Concurrency |
| Jinshui District, Zhengzhou, Henan | | | | North 3rd Ring Rd. (E) | North 3rd Ring Road (eastern extension) | Under planning |
| Jinshui District, Zhengzhou, Henan | Zhengzhou East Service Area | | | | | |
| Jinshui District, Zhengzhou, Henan | | | 662 | Zhengzhou New Area | Jinshui E. Road – Zhengdong New Area CBD, Zhengzhou East railway station Zhengkai Avenue – Kaifeng | |
| Guancheng Hui District, Zhengzhou, Henan | 666.9 | 414.4 | 666 | Putian | G220 / G310 (Shangdu Road) – Zhongmu; Longhai Expressway – Downtown Zhengzhou; East 4th Ring Road | |
| Guancheng Hui District, Zhengzhou, Henan | | | 669 | Hanghai E. Rd. | Hanghai E. Road | |
| Guancheng Hui District, Zhengzhou, Henan | | | 671 | South 3rd Ring Rd. | South 3rd Ring Road (eastern extension); Xin'an Road – Zhongmu | |
| Zhongmu County, Zhengzhou, Henan | | | 677 | Xiangyunsi Interchange | G3001 / Henan S82 – Yaoshan, Shaolin Temple, Kaifeng | Southern terminus of G3001 concurrency |
| Xinzheng, Zhengzhou, Henan | | | 688 | Airport | Yingbin Elevated Road – Zhengzhou Xinzheng International Airport; Henan S1 – Downtown Zhengzhou (for northbound traffic only) | |
| Xinzheng, Zhengzhou, Henan | 694.1 | 431.3 | 694 | Xuedian | Henan S102 – Xuedian, Zhengzhou Airport Economy Zone | |
| Xinzheng, Zhengzhou, Henan | Xinzheng Service Area | | | | | |
| Xinzheng, Zhengzhou, Henan | | | | Henan S60 – Shangqiu, Weishi, Xinmi, Dengfeng | | |
| Xinzheng, Zhengzhou, Henan | | | | Shuanghehu | Zhiyang Road – Shuanghe Lake Central Park | |
| Xinzheng, Zhengzhou, Henan | 707.3 | 439.5 | 707 | Xinzheng | Henan S223 – Xinzheng, Baqian | |
| Changge, Xuchang, Henan | Xuchang Service Area | | | | | |
| Changge, Xuchang, Henan | 725.2 | 450.6 | 725 | Changge | Changshe Road – Changge | |
| Jian'an District, Xuchang, Henan | | | | North Xuchang | Xinyuan Avenue – Jian'an | |
| Jian'an District, Xuchang, Henan | 746.2 | 463.7 | 746 | Xuchang | G311 – Xuchang, Yanling | |
| Jian'an District, Xuchang, Henan | 752.6 | 467.6 | | Xuchang East City | G107 / G311 – Xuchang | |
| Jian'an District, Xuchang, Henan | | | | G1516 (currently designated as Henan S32) / G0421 / Henan S83 – Lankao, Pingdingshan, Nanyang | | |
| Linying County, Luohe, Henan | 773.2 | 480.4 | 773 | Linying | Henan S329 – Linying | |
| Linying County, Luohe, Henan | Luohe Service Area | | | | | |
| Yancheng District, Luohe, Henan | 794.8 | 493.9 | | Luohe | Henan S330 – Luohe | |
| Shaoling District, Luohe, Henan | 805.2 | 500.3 | 805 | South Luohe | Renmin Road – Luohe | |
| Shaoling District, Luohe, Henan | | | 806 | G36 – Zhoukou, Pingdingshan | | |
| Xiping County, Zhumadian, Henan | 828.1 | 514.6 | 828 | Xiping | Henan S331 – Xiping | |
| Xiping County, Zhumadian, Henan | Zhumadian Service Area | | | | | |
| Suiping County, Zhumadian, Henan | | | | Henan S81 | | Under construction |
| Suiping County, Zhumadian, Henan | 850.2 | 528.3 | 850 | Suiping | Henan S338 – Suiping | |
| Suiping County, Zhumadian, Henan | | | | North Zhumadian | | Under construction |
| Yicheng District, Zhumadian, Henan | 867.7 | 539.2 | | Zhumadian | Kaiyuan Avenue – Zhumadian | |
| Yicheng District, Zhumadian, Henan | | | | South Zhumadian | Ruhe Avenue – Zhumadian | |
| Yicheng District, Zhumadian, Henan | | | | Henan S38 – Xincai, Biyang | | |
| Queshan County, Zhumadian, Henan | 891.8 | 554.1 | | Queshan | Langling Avenue – Queshan | |
| Queshan County, Zhumadian, Henan | Queshan Service Area | | | | | |
| Queshan County, Zhumadian, Henan | | | | Zhengyang | Henan S224 – Queshan, Zhengyang | |
| Queshan County, Zhumadian, Henan | | | | Henan S62 | | Under construction |
| Queshan County, Zhumadian, Henan | 926.6 | 575.8 | | Minggang | Henan S335 – Minggang | |
| Pingqiao District, Xinyang, Henan | Minggang Parking Area (under construction) | | | | | |
| Pingqiao District, Xinyang, Henan | | | | North Xinyang | Y004 | |
| Pingqiao District, Xinyang, Henan | Xinyang Service Area | | | | | |
| Pingqiao District, Xinyang, Henan | | | | G40 – Luoshan, Biyang | | |
| Pingqiao District, Xinyang, Henan | 968.9 | 602.0 | 969 | Xinyang | G312 – Xinyang | |
| Luoshan County, Xinyang, Henan | 988.96 | 614.51 | 989 | Lingshan | Henan S339 – Lingshan | |
| Luoshan County, Xinyang, Henan | Lingshan Service Area | | | | | |
| Luoshan County, Xinyang, Henan | Yu'e Toll Station | | | | | |
| Luoshan County, Xinyang, Henan | | | | Jigongshan | | Under construction |
| Dawu County, Xiaogan, Hubei | Sanli Parking Area | | | | | |
| Dawu County, Xiaogan, Hubei | Ebei Toll Station | | | | | |
| Dawu County, Xiaogan, Hubei | | | | Daxin | Hubei S320 | |
| Dawu County, Xiaogan, Hubei | | | | Dawu | Yingbin Avenue – Dawu | |
| Dawu County, Xiaogan, Hubei | Dawu Service Area | | | | | |
| Dawu County, Xiaogan, Hubei | | | | Hubei S28 – Guangshui, Suizhou | | |
| Xiaochang County, Xiaogan, Hubei | | | | Xiaohe | Hubei S243 – Xiaohe | |
| Xiaochang County, Xiaogan, Hubei | Huayuan Parking Area (under construction) | | | | | |
| Xiaochang County, Xiaogan, Hubei | | | | Xiaochang | Xiaochang | |
| Xiaonan District, Xiaogan, Hubei | | | | Yangdian | Hubei S310 – Yangdian, Xihe | |
| Xiaonan District, Xiaogan, Hubei | Xiaogan Service Area | | | | | |
| Xiaonan District, Xiaogan, Hubei | | | | G70 – Wuhan, Anlu | | |
| Xiaonan District, Xiaogan, Hubei | | | 1120 | East Xiaogan | Hubei S110 – Xiaogan | |
| Dongxihu District, Wuhan, Hubei | | | | Hubei S17 – Wuhan | | |
| Dongxihu District, Wuhan, Hubei | Dongxihu Service Area | | | | | |
| Dongxihu District, Wuhan, Hubei | | | 1148 | G42 / G4201 – Hefei, Tianhe Airport, Jingmen, Yichang | | Northern terminus of G4201 concurrency |
| Dongxihu District, Wuhan, Hubei | | | 1153 | North Wuhan | G107 (Dongxihu Avenue) – Dongxihu, Hankou | |
| Caidian District, Wuhan, Hubei | | | 1161 | Caidian | Hubei S104 – Caidian | |
| Caidian District, Wuhan, Hubei | | | 1162 | Hubei S15 – Yichang, Wuhan urban area (3rd Ring Road) | | |
| Caidian District, Wuhan, Hubei | Caidian Service Area | | | | | |
| Caidian District, Wuhan, Hubei | | | 1174 | West Wuhan | G50 / G318 (Dongfeng Avenue) – Yichang, Hanyang | Western terminus of G50 concurrency |
| Caidian District, Wuhan, Hubei | | | 1183 | Junshan | Hubei S101 / Hubei S103 (Hannan Avenue) – Junshan, Hannan | |
| Caidian District, Wuhan, Hubei | | | 1184 | Hubei S13 – Hannan, Honghu, Zhuankou | | |
| Jiangxia District, Wuhan, Hubei | | | 1189 | Jinkou | Hubei S101 – Jinkou | |
| Jiangxia District, Wuhan, Hubei | | | | G0422 | | |
| Jiangxia District, Wuhan, Hubei | Jinkou Parking Area | | | | | |
| Jiangxia District, Wuhan, Hubei | | | 1196 | Hubei S11 – Wuchang | | |
| Jiangxia District, Wuhan, Hubei | | | 1198 | South Wuhan | G50 / G4201 / G107 – Huangshi, Shanghai, south Wuhan | Southern terminus of G4201 concurrency and eastern terminus of G50 consurrency |
| Jiangxia District, Wuhan, Hubei | | | 1217 | Anshan | X009 – Anshan | |
| Xian'an District, Xianning, Hubei | Xianning Service Area | | | | | |
| Xian'an District, Xianning, Hubei | | | 1238 | North Xianning | Guixiang Avenue – Xianning | |
| Xian'an District, Xianning, Hubei | | | | Hubei S78 – Daye, Xiantao | | |
| Xian'an District, Xianning, Hubei | | | 1251 | South Xianning | Hubei S329 – Xianning | |
| Chibi, Xianning, Hubei | | | 1257 | Quankou | X044 – Tingsiqiao | |
| Chibi, Xianning, Hubei | Chibi Service Area | | | | | |
| Chibi, Xianning, Hubei | | | 1290 | Chibi | Hubei S214 – Chibi | |
| Chibi, Xianning, Hubei | | | | G0422 – Wuhan, Jiayu, Tongcheng | | |
| Chibi, Xianning, Hubei | | | 1308 | Xindian | X032 – Xindian | |
| Chibi, Xianning, Hubei | E'nan Toll Station | | | | | |
| Linxiang, Yueyang, Hunan | Yanglousi Service Area | | | | | |
| Linxiang, Yueyang, Hunan | Yanglousi Toll Station | | | | | |
| Linxiang, Yueyang, Hunan | | | 1326 | Jinji | Yanglousi | |
| Linxiang, Yueyang, Hunan | Linxiang Service Area | | | | | |
| Linxiang, Yueyang, Hunan | | | 1343 | Linxiang | Linxiang Avenue – G107, Linxiang | |
| Linxiang, Yueyang, Hunan | | | | G56 – Yueyang, Tongcheng | | |
| Linxiang, Yueyang, Hunan | | | 1358 | Taolin | Hunan S301 – Taolin | |
| Linxiang, Yueyang, Hunan | Taolin Service Area | | | | | |
| Yueyanglou District, Yueyang, Hunan | | | 1373 | Yueyang | Yueyang Avenue – Yueyang | |
| Yueyang County, Yueyang, Hunan | | | | Longwan Interchange | Connection route – Hunan S61 | |
| Yueyang County, Yueyang, Hunan | | | 1390 | Rongjiawan | Hunan S201 – Xinqiang, Rongjiawan | |
| Yueyang County, Yueyang, Hunan | Baling Service Area | | | | | |
| Miluo, Yueyang, Hunan | | | 1407 | Dajing | G107 – Dajing | |
| Miluo, Yueyang, Hunan | Dajing Parking Area | | | | | |
| Pingjiang County, Yueyang, Hunan | | | 1427 | West Pingjiang | Hunan S308 – Wushi, Pingjiang | |
| Pingjiang County, Yueyang, Hunan | Pingjiang Service Area | | | | | |
| Changsha County, Changsha, Hunan | | | 1450 | Bancang | X024 – Kaihui | |
| Changsha County, Changsha, Hunan | | | 1464 | Guangfu | G107 / X026 – Qingshanpu | |
| Changsha County, Changsha, Hunan | Ansha Parking Area | | | | | |
| Changsha County, Changsha, Hunan | | | 1484 | Yangzichong | G0401 – Yangzichong, Yiyang, Huanghua Airport, Zhuzhou | |
| Changsha County, Changsha, Hunan | | | 1489 | Xingsha | G107 – Xingsha, Changsha E&T Development Zone | |
| Changsha County, Changsha, Hunan | Changsha Service Area | | | | | |
| Changsha County, Changsha, Hunan | | | 1493 | Changsha | G319 (Sanyi Avenue) – Kaifu District, Changsha; Hunan S20 – Liuyang | |
| Yuhua District, Changsha, Hunan | | | 1501 | Yuhua | Changsha Avenue – Yuhua District, Changsha; Hunan S40 – Changsha Huanghua International Airport, Changsha South railway station | |
| Yuhua District, Changsha, Hunan | | | 1517 | Lijiatang | G0401 – Lijiatang, Yiyang, Huanghua Airport, Liuyang | |
| Yuetang District, Xiangtan, Hunan | | | | Zhaoshan | Zhaoshan N. Road – Zhaoshan | |
| Yuetang District, Xiangtan, Hunan | Zhaoshan Service Area | | | | | |
| Yuetang District, Xiangtan, Hunan | | | | Yinjia'ao Interchange | G60 – Liling, Loudi | |
| Yuetang District, Xiangtan, Hunan | | | | Majiahe | Xiangtan Avenue – Xiangtan | |
| Tianyuan District, Zhuzhou, Hunan | | | | West Zhuzhou | Zhuzhou Avenue – Zhuzhou; Tianyi Avenue – Xiangtan County | |
| Tianyuan District, Zhuzhou, Hunan | Jianning Parking Area | | | | | |
| Tianyuan District, Zhuzhou, Hunan | | | | Sanpu | Hunan S313 – Zhuzhou County, Tanjiashan | |
| Zhuzhou County, Zhuzhou, Hunan | | | | Wangshiwan | XB20 – Wangshiwan | |
| Zhuzhou County, Zhuzhou, Hunan | Zhuting Service Area | | | | | |
| Zhuzhou County, Zhuzhou, Hunan | | | | Zhuting | X094 – Hunan S211 | |
| Hengdong County, Hengdong, Hunan | | | | Xintang | Hunan S314 – Xintang, Hengshan | |
| Hengdong County, Hengdong, Hunan | Hengshan Service Area | | | | | |
| Hengdong County, Hengdong, Hunan | | | | East Nanyue Interchange | Hunan S78 – Nanyue | |
| Hengdong County, Hengdong, Hunan | | | | Dapu | Hunan S315 – Dapu, Hengdong | |
| Hengdong County, Hengdong, Hunan | | | | G72 / Hunan S80 – Chaling, Hengyang | | Northern terminus of G72 concurrency |
| Hengdong County, Hengdong, Hunan | Yancheng Service Area | | | | | |
| Hengnan County, Hengdong, Hunan | | | | Hongshi Interchange | G72 – Hengyang | Southern terminus of G72 concurrency |
| Hengnan County, Hengdong, Hunan | | | | Guanshi | Hunan S316 – Guanshi | |
| Hengnan County, Hengdong, Hunan | Guanshi Service Area | | | | | |
| Leiyang, Hengdong, Hunan | | | | Xinshi | X015 / X025 – Xinshi | |
| Leiyang, Hengdong, Hunan | Leiyang Service Area | | | | | |
| Leiyang, Hengdong, Hunan | | | | Leiyang | Hunan S320 / G107 – Leiyang | |
| Leiyang, Hengdong, Hunan | | | | Gongping | G107 – Gongpingxu | |
| Yongxing County, Chenzhou, Hunan | | | | Matian | X053 – Matian | |
| Yongxing County, Chenzhou, Hunan | Yongxing Service Area | | | | | |
| Yongxing County, Chenzhou, Hunan | | | | Yongxing | Hunan S212 – Yongxing | |
| Suxian District, Chenzhou, Hunan | | | | Wulipai | Hunan S212 / X043 – Wulipai, Zixing | |
| Suxian District, Chenzhou, Hunan | | | 1789 | Chenzhou | Hunan S322 (Chenzhou Avenue) – Chenzhou, Zixing | |
| Suxian District, Chenzhou, Hunan | | | | Shuilong Interchange | G76 – Guiyang County, Rucheng County | |
| Suxian District, Chenzhou, Hunan | Suxian Service Area | | | | | |
| Suxian District, Chenzhou, Hunan | | | | Liangtian | G107 – Liangtian, Dengjiatang | |
| Yizhang County, Chenzhou, Hunan | Yizhang Service Area | | | | | |
| Yizhang County, Chenzhou, Hunan | | | | Yizhang | Hunan S324 / Hunan S31 – Yizhang | |
| Yizhang County, Chenzhou, Hunan | Xiaotang Toll Station | | | | | |
| Yizhang County, Chenzhou, Hunan | Xiaotang Service Area | | | | | |
| Lechang, Shaoguan, Guangdong | Yuebei Parking Area | | | | | |
| Lechang, Shaoguan, Guangdong | Yuebei Toll Station | | | | | |
| Lechang, Shaoguan, Guangdong | | | | North Pingshi Interchange | G0423 – Lechang, Guangzhou | Southbound exit and northbound entrance |
| Lechang, Shaoguan, Guangdong | | | | Pingshi | Guangdong S249 – Pingshi | |
| Lechang, Shaoguan, Guangdong | Meihua Parking Area | | | | | |
| Lechang, Shaoguan, Guangdong | | | | Meihua | Guangdong S249 – Meihua | |
| Lechang, Shaoguan, Guangdong | Dafugang Parking Area | | | | | |
| Lechang, Shaoguan, Guangdong | Yunyan Service Area | | | | | |
| Ruyuan County, Shaoguan, Guangdong | Daqiao Service Area | | | | | |
| Ruyuan County, Shaoguan, Guangdong | | | | Daqiao | Guangdong S249 – Daqiao | |
| Ruyuan County, Shaoguan, Guangdong | | | | Dongtian | Guangdong S249 – Dongtian | |
| Ruyuan County, Shaoguan, Guangdong | Dongtian Parking Area | | | | | |
| Ruyuan County, Shaoguan, Guangdong | | | | Ruyuan | G323 – Ruyuan | |
| Ruyuan County, Shaoguan, Guangdong | Ruyuan Parking Area | | | | | |
| Wujiang District, Shaoguan, Guangdong | Xinchaisang Parking Area | | | | | |
| Wujiang District, Shaoguan, Guangdong | | | | Madu Interchange | G0423 – Lechang, Guangzhou | |
| Wujiang District, Shaoguan, Guangdong | | | | North Shaoguan | G323 – Shaoguan, Longgui | |
| Wujiang District, Shaoguan, Guangdong | | | | Shaoguan | Shaoguan Avenue – Shaoguan, Shaoguan railway station | |
| Qujiang District, Shaoguan, Guangdong | | | | Maba Interchange | G6011 – Shaoguan, Nanxiong | |
| Qujiang District, Shaoguan, Guangdong | | | | South Shaoguan | Guangdong S253 – Qujiang | |
| Qujiang District, Shaoguan, Guangdong | Qujiang Service Area | | | | | |
| Qujiang District, Shaoguan, Guangdong | | | | Nanhuasi | X317 / G106 / Guangdong S253 – Shaxi, Wushi | |
| Wengyuan County, Shaoguan, Guangdong | | | | Wengcheng | G106 – Wengyuan | |
| Yingde, Qingyuan, Guangdong | Hengshuishi Service Area | | | | | |
| Yingde, Qingyuan, Guangdong | | | | Dazhen | G358 / Guangdong S252 – Dazhen | |
| Yingde, Qingyuan, Guangdong | | | | G78 | | Under construction |
| Yingde, Qingyuan, Guangdong | | | | Yuwan | Guangdong S252 – Yuwan | |
| Yingde, Qingyuan, Guangdong | Yuwan Service Area | | | | | |
| Fogang County, Qingyuan, Guangdong | | | | Gaogang | Guangdong S252 – Gaogang | |
| Fogang County, Qingyuan, Guangdong | Gaogang Service Area | | | | | |
| Fogang County, Qingyuan, Guangdong | | | | Fogang | G106 – Fogang | |
| Fogang County, Qingyuan, Guangdong | Fogang Service Area | | | | | |
| Fogang County, Qingyuan, Guangdong | | | 2092 | Tangtang | G106 – Tangtang, Qingyuan | |
| Conghua District, Guangzhou, Guangdong | Wayaogang Service Area | | | | | |
| Conghua District, Guangzhou, Guangdong | | | 2114 | Aotou | Guangdong S355 – Aotou, Conghua | |
| Huadu District, Guangzhou, Guangdong | | | 2130 | North Airport Interchange | G45 / G94 – Huadu, Baiyun Airport, Foshan, Conghua | |
| Huadu District, Guangzhou, Guangdong | | | 2131 | Beixing | Guangdong S118 – Beixing, Taiping | |
| Baiyun District, Guangzhou, Guangdong | | | 2137 | Zhongluotan | G105 – Zhongluotan | |
| Baiyun District, Guangzhou, Guangdong | | | 2150 | Guangdong S4 / G15 / G1508 – Guangzhou urban area, Panyu, Zhaoqing, Huizhou | | Northern terminus of G15 & G1508 concurrency |
| Huangpu District, Guangzhou, Guangdong | | | | Badou Interchange | Guangdong S2 – Guangzhou, Heyuan | |
| Huangpu District, Guangzhou, Guangdong | South Helong Service Area | | | | | |
| Huangpu District, Guangzhou, Guangdong | | | | Changping | G324 – Luogang, Shahe | |
| Huangpu District, Guangzhou, Guangdong | | | | G35 – Zengcheng, Huizhou, Shantou | | |
| Huangpu District, Guangzhou, Guangdong | | | 2171 | Huocun | G0425 / G1508 / Guangdong S15 – Zhuhai, Zhongshan, Panyu, Shunde, Guangzhou urban area, Foshan | Southern terminus of G1508 concurrency Connection to Macau via spur line G0425 |
| Huangpu District, Guangzhou, Guangdong | South & East Huocun Service Area | | | | | |
| Huangpu District, Guangzhou, Guangdong | | | 2175 | Luogang | Guangdong S117 – Luogang, Nangang | |
| Zengcheng District, Guangzhou, Guangdong | | | 2181 | Xintang | G107 – Xintang, Huangpu | |
| Dongguan, Guangdong | | | 2186 | Machong | Guangdong S120 – Machong, Zhongtang | |
| Dongguan, Guangdong | | | 2193 | Wangniudun | Guangdong S119 – Wangniudun, Hongmei | |
| Dongguan, Guangdong | | | 2198 | Daojiao | Zhenxing Road – Daojiao; Wanjiang Road – Wanjiang | |
| Dongguan, Guangdong | | | 2203 | Dongguan | Guangdong S256, Dongguan Avenue – Dongguan urban area | |
| Dongguan, Guangdong | Houjie Service Area | | | | | |
| Dongguan, Guangdong | | | 2208 | Houjie | Houjie Avenue – Houjie | |
| Dongguan, Guangdong | | | 2218 | North Humen | Guangdong S304 / Guangdong S358 – Dalingshan, Huizhou, Humen | |
| Dongguan, Guangdong | | | 2221 | Humen | G9411 / Guangdong S358 – Zhongshan, Zhuhai, Humen | Western terminus of G9411 concurrency |
| Dongguan, Guangdong | | | 2226 | Wudianmei Interchange | G9411 – Changping, Huizhou | Eastern terminus of G9411 concurrency |
| Dongguan, Guangdong | | | 2230 | Chang'an | Guangdong S358 – Chang'an | |
| Bao'an District, Shenzhen, Guangdong | | | 2240 | Xinqiao | G107 – Xinqiao, Shajing, Songgang | |
| Bao'an District, Shenzhen, Guangdong | | | 2244 | Shajing | Shajing | Northbound exit and southbound entrance only |
| Bao'an District, Shenzhen, Guangdong | | | 2250 | Fuyong | G107 – Shenzhen Bao'an International Airport air cargo area, Fuyong | |
| Bao'an District, Shenzhen, Guangdong | | | 2252 A-B | Hezhou | G15 – Longgang, Huizhou, Shantou; Airport South Road – Shenzhen Bao'an International Airport Terminal | Southern terminus of G15 concurrency |
| Bao'an District, Shenzhen, Guangdong | | | 2259 | Bao'an | Xixiang Avenue – Bao'an | |
| Nanshan District, Shenzhen, Guangdong | | | 2264 | Nantou | Nanhai Boulevard – Nanshan | |
| Nanshan District, Shenzhen, Guangdong | | | 2270 | Nanping | Nanping Expressway; Beihuan Boulevard | Northbound exit and southbound entrance only |
| Futian, Shenzhen, Guangdong | 2274 | 1,413 | 2274 | Futian | Shennan Boulevard, Binhai Boulevard – Futian, Nanshan | |
| Futian, Shenzhen, Guangdong | Huanggang Toll Station | | | | | |
Road in Mainland China continues as Huanggang Road
| Futian, Shenzhen, Guangdong | | | | Huanggang Port | | |
| Lok Ma Chau, Yuen Long, Hong Kong | | | | Lok Ma Chau Control Point | | |
Continues in Hong Kong as San Sham Road to Route 9 (San Tin Highway)
Closed/former; Concurrency terminus; HOV only; Incomplete access; Tolled; Route transition; Unopened
