= Gebeku =

Gebeku (Manchu: ᡤᡝᠪᡝᡴᡠ, romanized: Gebeku; d. 1646) was a Qing military officer from Jakūmu family of the Irgen Gioro clan assigned to the Manchu Plain White Banner.

== Biography ==
In 1644, Gebeku, then serving as a battalion commander in the Banner army, accompanied Imperial Regent Dorgon in the campaigns against Li Zicheng. For his achievements in pursuing the Li's forces all the way to Qingdu, he was awarded the hereditary rank of baitalabure hafan. He later joined Prince Ajige and Nikan in further operations against the Shun's peasant army. In 1646, Gebeku, together with the Banner battalion commander Siteku and officer Ubasi, followed Prince Hooge in the campaign against Zhang Xianzhong in Sichuan. During the battle, Gebeku defeated the infantry of the first defense line of the enemy forces, which had been surrounding and resisting the Qing army. In response, the peasant army divided its troops into two wings, with Zhang Xianzhong personally leading the right wing. Gebeku then led his Banner cavalry in successive attacks against both enemy flanks. Shortly thereafter, the peasant army surrounded troops of the Plain Blue Banner. Gebeku joined the rescue effort together with the niru commanders Arjin, Gadahun, Siteku, and Ubasi. During the fighting, however, Gebeku was struck by an arrow and killed in action. Siteku and Ubasi were also killed, and Zhang's troops subsequently withdrew from the battlefield.

In recognition of his service, the Qing court posthumously promoted his hereditary rank to tuwašara hafan in addition to baitalabure hafan (騎都尉兼一雲騎尉).
