= G0401 Changsha Ring Expressway =

Road in China

Changsha Ring Expressway
- 长沙绕城高速公路

Route information
- Length: 102 km (63 mi)

Major junctions
- Orbital around Changsha

Location
- Country: China

Highway system
- National Trunk Highway System; Primary; Auxiliary; National Highways; Transport in China
| ← G4 | → G0411 |

The Changsha Ring Expressway (Chinese: 长沙绕城高速), designated as G0401, is an expressway in Southern Central China orbiting the city of Changsha. This expressway is a branch of G4 Jinggang'ao Expressway.

== Detailed Itinerary ==
Counterclockwise
Continues as G0401 Changsha Ring Expressway
| 1 (101) | G4 Jinggang'ao Expressway |
| | Huangxing Ave; Changshaxian |
| | Kaiyuan E Road; Changshaxian |
| | S20 Zhangliu Expressway; G319 Road; Changshaxian |
| | S40 Changsha Airport Expressway |
| | S21 Changmang Expressway; Ganshan |
| | Huangxing Ave; Huangxing |
| | X026 Road Zuo Zongtang Tomb |
Changsha Metropolitan Area
| | G4 Jinggang'ao Expressway |
Lijiatang Toll Station
| | Wanjia Road; Changsha-Centre |
| | G107 Road; Queyuan Road; Changsha-Centre |
| 47 | Queyuan Road; Xinkaipu Road; Changsha-Centre |
Changsha Metropolitan Area
Heishipu Bridge
| 52 | Pingtang Ave. Towards Pingtang-Changsha, Yulelu |
| | S41 Changtan West Line Expressway; Yunxi Road; Changsha-Centre |
Changsha Metropolitan Area
| | G319 Road; Changsha-Centre |
| | G5513 Changzhang Expressway; Yuelu Ave. Changsha-Centre |
Changsha Metropolitan Area
| | S101 Road; Xincheng; Towards Wangcheng District-Changsha-Centre |
Changsha Metropolitan Area
| 87 | Huaning Road; S102 Road; Xianing-Changsha-Centre |
| 93 | Zhongqing Road; Changsha-Centre |
Changsha Metropolitan Area
| | G107 Road; Changshaxian |
Yangzichong Toll Station
| 101 (1) | G4 Jinggang'ao Expressway |
Continues as G0401 Changsha Ring Expressway
Clockwise
