= Xiaocun =

Xiaocun may refer to the following locations in China:

- Xiaocun Station (肖村站), a station on the Yizhuang Line of the Beijing Subway
- Xiaocun, Shaanxi (小村镇), town in Wugong County
- Xiaocun, Zhejiang (筱村镇), town in Taishun County
- Xiaocun Township, Hebei (肖村乡), in Dingxing County
- Xiaocun Township, Hubei (小村乡), in Xianfeng County
