= Beihe, Dingxing County =

Beihe 北河镇
- Town
- Běihé Zhèn
- Location in Hebei Location in China
- Coordinates: 39°12′48.4″N 115°45′36.2″E
- Country: People's Republic of China
- Province: Hebei
- Prefecture-level city: Baoding
- County: Dingxing County

Area
  - Total: 37.62 km^{2} (14.53 sq mi)

Population (2010)
  - Total: 19,637
  - Density: 522/km^{2} (1,350/sq mi)
- Time zone: UTC+8 (China Standard)
- Area code: 312

Beihe (Chinese: 北河镇; pinyin: Běihé Zhèn) is a town in Dingxing County, administered by the prefecture-level city of Baoding in Hebei Province, China. As of the 2010 census, the town had a population of 19,637 inhabitants across an area of 37.62 square kilometers, resulting in a population density of approximately 522 people per square kilometer.

According to the 2010 census, the population was 48.7% male (9,565 people) and 51.3% female (10,072 people). The age structure included 17% aged 0–14 years (3,335 people), 73.7% aged 15–64 years (14,482 people), and 9.3% aged 65 years and over (1,820 people).

== See also ==
- List of township-level divisions of Hebei
