= Gaoli Township =

Gaoli Township 高里乡
- Township
- Gāolǐ Xiāng
- Location in Hebei Location in China
- Coordinates: 39°16′41.9″N 115°41′22.5″E
- Country: People's Republic of China
- Province: Hebei
- Prefecture-level city: Baoding
- County: Dingxing County

Area
  - Total: 78.32 km^{2} (30.24 sq mi)

Population (2010)
  - Total: 47,787
  - Density: 610.1/km^{2} (1,580/sq mi)
- Time zone: UTC+8 (China Standard)
- Area code: 312

Gaoli Township (Chinese: 高里乡; pinyin: Gāolǐ Xiāng) is a township in Dingxing County, within the jurisdiction of Baoding, in Hebei Province, China. According to the 2010 census, the township had a total population of 47,787 inhabitants residing in an area of 78.32 square kilometers, resulting in a population density of approximately 610 persons per square kilometer.

Demographic data from 2010 shows a nearly equal gender distribution with 49.8% (23,803) male and 50.2% (23,984) female residents. Age distribution was as follows: 0–14 years – 7,611 persons (15.9%), 15–64 years – 35,720 persons (74.7%), and 65 years and older – 4,456 persons (9.3%).

== See also ==
- List of township-level divisions of Hebei
