= Liuzhuo Township =

Liuzhuo Township 柳卓乡
- Township
- Liǔzhuó Xiāng
- Location in Hebei Location in China
- Coordinates: 39°10′27.3″N 115°46′17.8″E
- Country: People's Republic of China
- Province: Hebei
- Prefecture-level city: Baoding
- County: Dingxing County

Area
  - Total: 29.31 km^{2} (11.32 sq mi)

Population (2010)
  - Total: 21,679
  - Density: 739.7/km^{2} (1,916/sq mi)
- Time zone: UTC+8 (China Standard)
- Area code: 312

Liuzhuo Township (Chinese: 柳卓乡; pinyin: Liǔzhuó Xiāng) is a rural township located in Dingxing County, under the administration of Baoding, in the central part of Hebei Province, China. According to the 2010 census, the township had a population of 21,679 and covered a total area of 29.31 square kilometers, resulting in a population density of about 740 people per square kilometer.

As of 2010, the gender distribution in the township was 47.7% male (10,338) and 52.3% female (11,341). Age demographics showed 16.4% (3,562) aged 0–14, 74.2% (16,078) aged 15–64, and 9.4% (2,039) aged 65 and over.

== See also ==
- List of township-level divisions of Hebei
