= Dingxing County =

Dingxing County 定兴县 Tinghing
- County
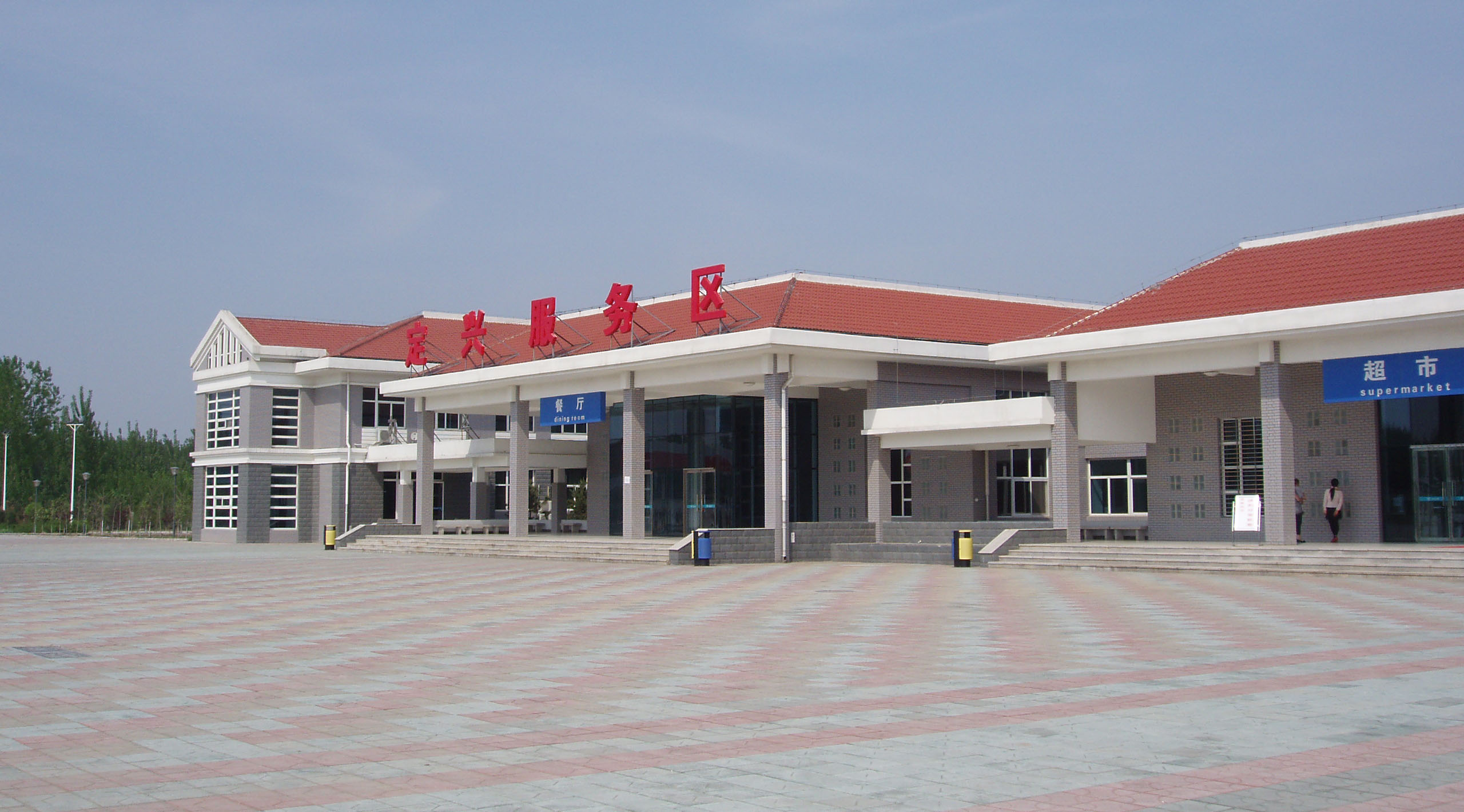
- A highway service station in Dingxing

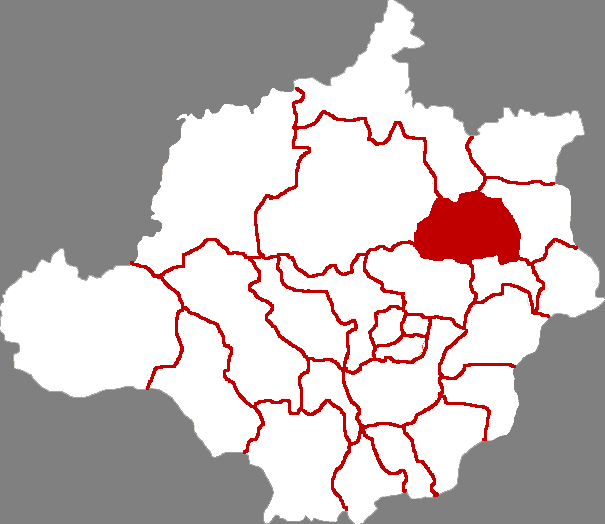
- Dingxing in Baoding

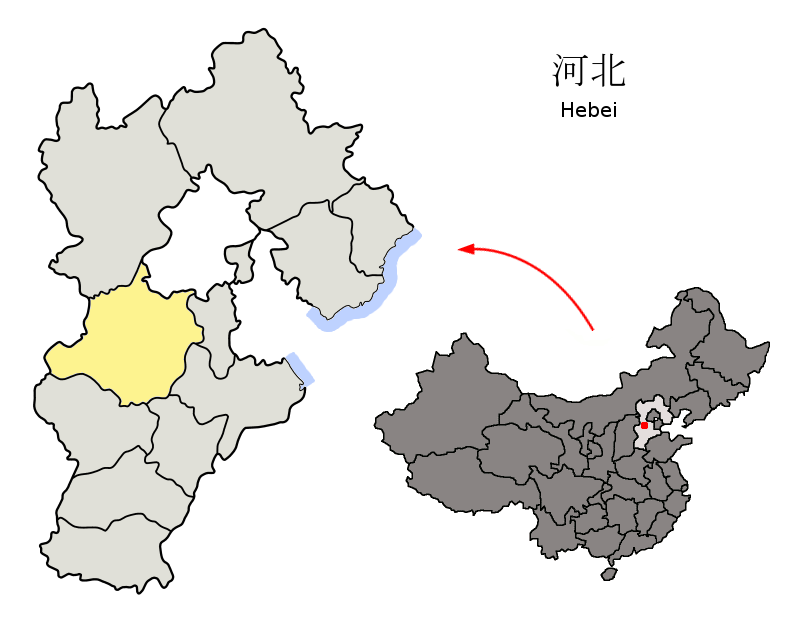
- Baoding in Hebei
- Coordinates: 39°15′47″N 115°48′29″E
- Country: People's Republic of China
- Province: Hebei
- Prefecture-level city: Baoding
- County seat: Dingxing Town (定兴镇)

Area
  - Total: 714 km^{2} (276 sq mi)
- Elevation: 30 m (98 ft)

Population (2020 census)
  - Total: 512,765
  - Density: 718/km^{2} (1,860/sq mi)
- Time zone: UTC+8 (China Standard)
- Postal code: 072650
- Area code: 0312
- Website: dingxing.gov.cn

Dingxing County (simplified Chinese: 定兴县; traditional Chinese: 定興縣; pinyin: Dìngxīng Xiàn) is a county under the jurisdiction of the prefecture-level city of Baoding in central Hebei province, People's Republic of China. It has an area of 714 km^{2} (276 sq mi) and 512,765 inhabitants (2020). It is served by China National Highway 107 and G4 Beijing–Hong Kong and Macau Expressway.

== Administrative divisions ==
There are 5 towns and 11 townships under the county's administration.

Towns:

- Dingxing (定兴镇), Gucheng (固城镇), Xianyu (贤寓镇), Beihe (北河镇), Tiangongsi (天宫寺镇)

Townships:

- Donglaobo Township (东落堡乡), Gaoli Township (高里乡), Zhangjiazhuang Township (张家庄乡), Yaocun Township (姚村镇), Xiaocun Township (肖村乡), Liudiao Township (柳卓乡), Yangcun Township (杨村乡), Beitian Township (北田乡), Beinancai Township (北南蔡乡), Liyuzhuang Township (李郁庄乡), Xiaozhuzhuang Township (小朱庄乡)
