= Liyuzhuang Township =

Liyuzhuang Township 李郁庄乡
- Township
- Lǐyùzhuāng Xiāng
- Location in Hebei Location in China
- Coordinates: 39°14′17.8″N 115°51′31.9″E
- Country: People's Republic of China
- Province: Hebei
- Prefecture-level city: Baoding
- County: Dingxing County

Area
  - Total: 29.83 km^{2} (11.52 sq mi)

Population (2010)
  - Total: 17,771
  - Density: 595.7/km^{2} (1,543/sq mi)
- Time zone: UTC+8 (China Standard)
- Area code: 312

Liyuzhuang Township (Chinese: 李郁庄乡; pinyin: Lǐyùzhuāng Xiāng) is a rural township located in Dingxing County, under the jurisdiction of the prefecture-level city of Baoding in Hebei Province, China. According to the 2010 Chinese Census, it had a population of 17,771 and covered a total area of 29.83 square kilometers, resulting in a population density of approximately 596 people per square kilometer.

In terms of demographics, the gender distribution was nearly even in 2010, with 49.6% male (8,816 people) and 50.4% female (8,955 people). The age breakdown was as follows: 17.2% (3,061 people) were under the age of 15, 73.8% (13,119 people) were between 15 and 64, and 9% (1,591 people) were aged 65 and above.

== See also ==
- List of township-level divisions of Hebei
