= Gucheng, Dingxing County =

Gucheng 固城镇
- Town
- Gucheng Zhen
- Location in Hebei Location in China
- Coordinates: 39°08′24.4″N 115°43′25.0″E
- Country: People's Republic of China
- Province: Hebei
- Prefecture-level city: Baoding
- County: Dingxing County

Area
  - Total: 65.75 km^{2} (25.39 sq mi)

Population (2010)
  - Total: 45,429
  - Density: 690.9/km^{2} (1,789/sq mi)
- Time zone: UTC+8 (China Standard)
- Area code: 312

Gucheng (Chinese: 固城镇; pinyin: Gùchéng Zhèn) is a town in Dingxing County, administered by Baoding in Hebei Province, China. According to the 2010 census, it had a population of 45,429 residents. The town spans an area of 65.75 square kilometers, with a population density of 690.9 per square kilometer.

The 2010 census data showed that the population was composed of 22,035 males and 23,394 females. Children under the age of 15 made up 16.8% of the population, while 73.5% were aged 15–64 and 9.7% were 65 and over.

== See also ==
- List of township-level divisions of Hebei
