= G1813 Weihai–Qingdao Expressway =

Road in China

Weihai–Qingdao Expressway
- 威海－青岛高速公路
- Weiqing Expressway 威青高速公路

Route information
- Auxiliary route of G18

Major junctions
- West end: G20 in Jimo District, Qingdao, Shandong
- East end: S303 in Huancui District, Weihai, Shandong

Location
- Country: China

Highway system
- National Trunk Highway System; Primary; Auxiliary; National Highways; Transport in China
← G1812	→ G1815

The G1813 Weihai–Qingdao Expressway (Chinese: 威海—青岛高速公路), also referred to as the Weiqing Expressway (Chinese: 威青高速公路), is an expressway in Shandong, China that connects Weihai to Qingdao.

== Route ==
The expressway begins in Huancui District, Weihai, before passing through Rushan, Haiyang and Laiyang, before terminating in Jimo District, Qingdao. The entire route is located in the province of Shandong and was originally designated as Shandong Provincial Expressway S24 until 2019.
