= Beinancai Township =

Beinancai Township 北南蔡乡
- Township
- Běináncài Xiāng
- Location in Hebei Location in China
- Coordinates: 39°07′45.7″N 115°54′27.8″E
- Country: People's Republic of China
- Province: Hebei
- Prefecture-level city: Baoding
- County: Dingxing County

Area
  - Total: 27.90 km^{2} (10.77 sq mi)

Population (2010)
  - Total: 19,545
  - Density: 700.6/km^{2} (1,815/sq mi)
- Time zone: UTC+8 (China Standard)
- Area code: 312

Beinancai Township (Chinese: 北南蔡乡; pinyin: Běináncài Xiāng) is a rural township in Dingxing County, under the jurisdiction of the prefecture-level city of Baoding, in Hebei Province, China. According to the 2010 Chinese Census, the township had a population of 19,545 and covered an area of 27.90 square kilometers, yielding a population density of approximately 701 people per square kilometer.

In terms of demographics, the population in 2010 was composed of 48.6% males (10,047) and 51.4% females (9,498). The age distribution was 16.3% (3,185) under 15 years old, 74.6% (14,588) between 15 and 64 years old, and 9.1% (1,772) aged 65 and above.

== See also ==
- List of township-level divisions of Hebei
