= Xianyu, Hebei =

Xianyu 贤寓镇
- Town
- Xiányù Zhèn
- Location in Hebei Location in China
- Coordinates: 39°10′42.4″N 115°37′00.8″E
- Country: People's Republic of China
- Province: Hebei
- Prefecture-level city: Baoding
- County: Dingxing County

Area
  - Total: 63.94 km^{2} (24.69 sq mi)

Population (2010)
  - Total: 41,041
  - Density: 641.9/km^{2} (1,663/sq mi)
- Time zone: UTC+8 (China Standard)
- Area code: 312

Xianyu (Chinese: 贤寓镇; pinyin: Xiányù Zhèn) is a town in Dingxing County, administered by the prefecture-level city of Baoding in Hebei Province, China. As of the 2010 census, the town had a population of 41,041 people, spread over an area of 63.94 square kilometers, giving it a population density of 641.9 inhabitants per square kilometer.

According to the 2010 census, males made up 49.8% of the population (20,420 people), and females 50.2% (20,621 people). The age distribution was 16.1% aged 0–14 (6,618 people), 74.4% aged 15–64 (30,528 people), and 9.5% aged 65 and over (3,895 people).

== See also ==
- List of township-level divisions of Hebei
