= G1811 Huanghua–Shijiazhuang Expressway =

Road in Hebei, China

Huanghua–Shijiazhuang Expressway
- 黄骅－石家庄高速公路
- Huangshi Expressway 黄石高速公路

Route information
- Auxiliary route of G18
- Length: 313.87 km (195.03 mi)
- Existed: 10 December 2000–present

Major junctions
- East end: G307 in Cangzhou, Hebei
- G18 / G25 in Huanghua, Cangzhou, Hebei; G2 in Cangzhou, Hebei; G3 in Cangzhou, Hebei; G45 in Shenzhou, Hengshui, Hebei; G4 in Shijiazhuang, Hebei
- West end: G5 in Shijiazhuang, Hebei

Location
- Country: China

Highway system
- National Trunk Highway System; Primary; Auxiliary; National Highways; Transport in China
← G18	→ G1812

The G1811 Huanghua–Shijiazhuang Expressway (Chinese: 黄骅—石家庄高速公路), commonly referred to as the Huangshi Expressway (Chinese: 黄石高速公路), is a 313.87-kilometre-long Chinese expressway (195.03 mi) that connects the cities of Huanghua and Shijiazhuang. The expressway is entirely in the province of Hebei and opened on 10 December 2000. It is the only auxiliary spur of the G18 Rongcheng–Wuhai Expressway.
