= Dongluobao Township =

Dongluobao Township 东落堡乡
- Township
- Location in Hebei
- Coordinates: 39°16′58″N 115°44′18″E
- Country: People's Republic of China
- Province: Hebei
- Prefecture-level city: Baoding
- County: Dingxing
- Village-level divisions: 16 villages
- Elevation: 34 m (112 ft)
- Time zone: UTC+8 (China Standard)
- Area code: 0312

Dongluobao Township (simplified Chinese: 东落堡乡; traditional Chinese: 東落堡鄉; pinyin: Dōngluòbǎo Xiāng) is a township of Dingxing County, in central Hebei province, China. As of 2020, it has 16 villages under its administration:

- Dongluobao Village
- Nanyin Village (南引村)
- Dongyin Village (东引村)
- Dongceshang Village (东册上村)
- Xiceshang Village (西册上村)
- Dongxianggai Village (东相盖村)
- Xixianggai Village (西相盖村)
- Chenjiazhuang Village (陈家庄村)
- Datian Village (大田村)
- Wuliyao Village (五里窑村)
- Tianhou Village (田候村)
- Wu Village (吴村)
- Beidawei Village (北大位村)
- Nandawei Village (南大位村)
- Xiaoren Village (小任村)
- Daren Village (大任村)

== See also ==
- List of township-level divisions of Hebei
