= Tiangongsi =

Tiangongsi 天宫寺镇
- Town
- Tiāngōngsì Zhèn
- Location in Hebei Location in China
- Coordinates: 39°14′14.3″N 115°53′53.2″E
- Country: People's Republic of China
- Province: Hebei
- Prefecture-level city: Baoding
- County: Dingxing County

Area
  - Total: 44.19 km^{2} (17.06 sq mi)

Population (2010)
  - Total: 34,213
  - Density: 774.3/km^{2} (2,005/sq mi)
- Time zone: UTC+8 (China Standard)
- Area code: 312

Tiangongsi (Chinese: 天宫寺镇; pinyin: Tiāngōngsì Zhèn) is a town located in Dingxing County, under the jurisdiction of the prefecture-level city of Baoding, in Hebei Province, China. As of the 2010 census, the town had a population of 34,213 inhabitants within a total area of 44.19 square kilometers, resulting in a population density of approximately 774 people per square kilometer.

According to the 2010 census, Tiangongsi’s population was 49.9% male (17,136 people) and 50.1% female (17,077 people). The age distribution included 17.9% (6,132) aged 0–14 years, 74.0% (25,322) aged 15–64 years, and 8.1% (2,759) aged 65 years or older.

== See also ==
- List of township-level divisions of Hebei
