= Zhangjiazhuang Township, Hebei =

Zhangjiazhuang Township 张家庄乡
- Township
- Zhāngjiāzhuāng Xiāng
- Location in Hebei Location in China
- Coordinates: 39°12′39.5″N 115°33′40.7″E
- Country: People's Republic of China
- Province: Hebei
- Prefecture-level city: Baoding
- County: Dingxing County

Area
  - Total: 24.00 km^{2} (9.27 sq mi)

Population (2010)
  - Total: 16,330
  - Density: 680.4/km^{2} (1,762/sq mi)
- Time zone: UTC+8 (China Standard)
- Area code: 312

Zhangjiazhuang Township (Chinese: 张家庄乡; pinyin: Zhāngjiāzhuāng Xiāng) is a rural township located in Dingxing County, under the administration of Baoding, in the central part of Hebei Province, China. According to the 2010 census, the township had a population of 16,330 people and covered a total area of 24.00 square kilometers, yielding a population density of approximately 680 inhabitants per square kilometer.

According to census data from 2010, the township's population was made up of 48.7% males (7,945) and 51.3% females (8,385). The age distribution consisted of 17.9% (2,919) aged 0–14 years, 72.2% (11,793) aged 15–64 years, and 9.9% (1,618) aged 65 years and over.

== See also ==
- List of township-level divisions of Hebei
