= Xiaocun Township, Hebei =

Coordinates: 39°10′22″N 115°41′51″E

Xiaocun Township
- Subdistrict

Chinese transcription(s)
- Interactive map of Xiaocun Township
- Country: China
- Province: Hebei
- Prefecture: Baoding
- Time zone: UTC+8 (China Standard Time)

Xiaocun Township (Chinese: 肖村乡; pinyin: Xiàocūn Xiāng) is a township-level division situated in Dingxing County, Baoding, Hebei, China.

== See also ==
- List of township-level divisions of Hebei
