= Wangshiwan, Zhuzhou =

Wangshiwan Township
- Township

Chinese transcription(s)
  - Simplified: 王十万乡
  - Traditional: 王十萬鄉
  - Pinyin: Wangshiwan Xiang
- Location in China
- Coordinates: 27°28′03″N 113°03′28″E
- Country: People's Republic of China
- Province: Hunan
- City: Zhuzhou
- County: Zhuzhou County

Population
  - Total: 26,608
- Time zone: UTC+8 (China Standard)
- Area code: 0733

Wanshiwan Township (simplified Chinese: 王十万乡; traditional Chinese: 王十萬鄉; pinyin: Wangshiwan Xiang), is a rural township in Zhuzhou County, Zhuzhou City, Hunan Province, People's Republic of China.

== Cityscape ==
The township is divided into 20 villages and 1 community, the following areas: Wangshiwan Community, Lashu Village, Xiangxing Village, Yanjia Village, Chishi Village, Wanzhou Village, Shenshan Village, Changyuan Village, Hebao Village, Shantang Village, Meichong Village, Huashi Village, Midou Village, Yinpai Village, Shilong Village, Xinhu Village, Wangshiwan0 Village, Shihuichong Village, Fujiachong Village, Fengxianqiao Village, and Bangtou Village (王十万社区、腊树村、象形村、颜家村、赤石村、挽洲村、神山村、长源村、荷包村、山塘村、梅冲村、花石村、米斗村、银牌村、石龙村、新湖村、王十万村、石灰冲村、傅家冲村、枫仙桥村、榜头村).
