= G1812 Cangzhou–Yulin Expressway =

Road in China

Cangzhou–Yulin Expressway
- 沧州－榆林高速公路
- Cangyu Expressway 沧榆高速公路

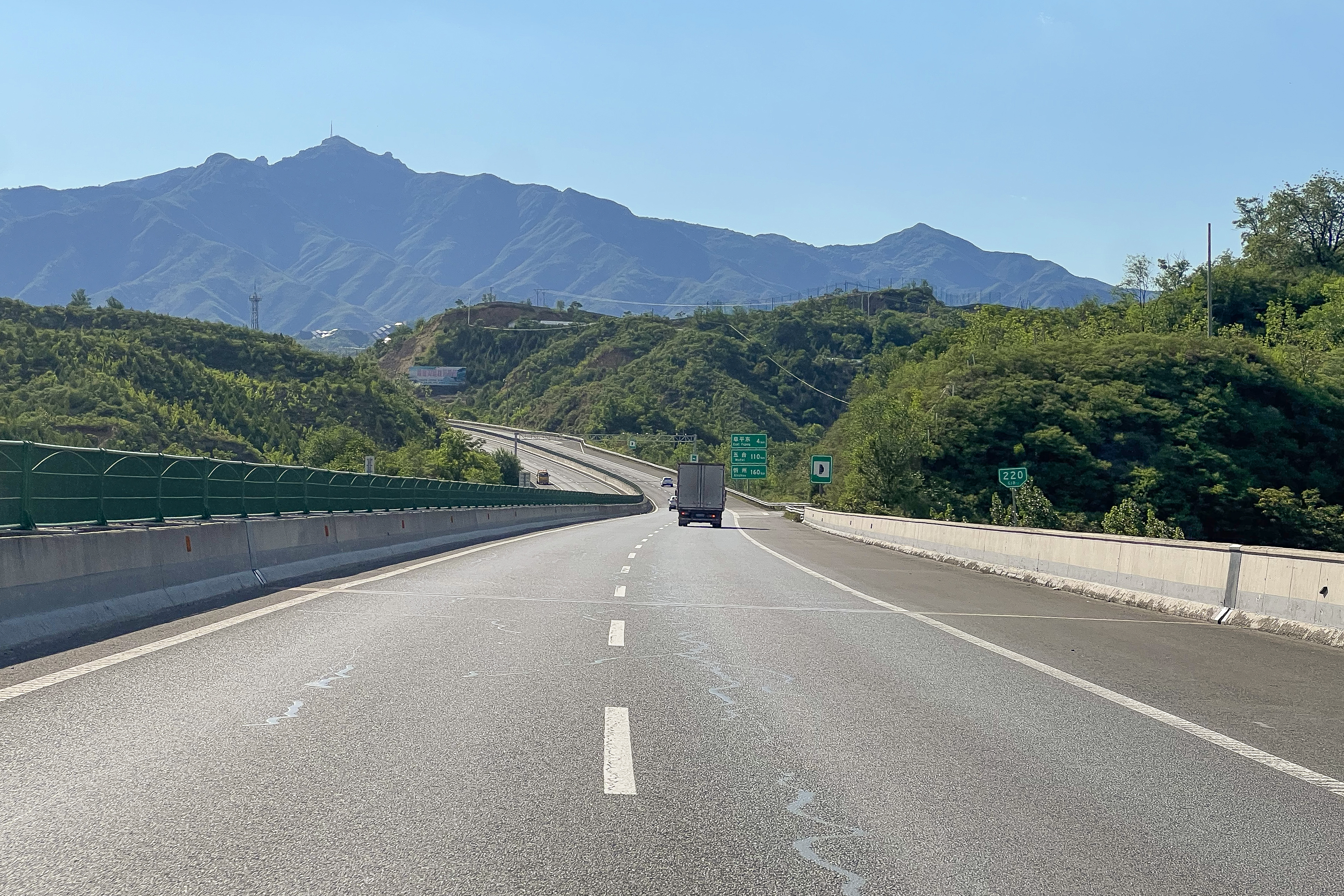
- G1812 in Fuping, Baoding, Hebei

Route information
- Auxiliary route of G18
- Length: 731.66 km (454.63 mi)

Major junctions
- West end: G65 in Yuyang District, Yulin, Shaanxi
- East end: G1811 in Cang County, Cangzhou, Hebei

Location
- Country: China

Highway system
- National Trunk Highway System; Primary; Auxiliary; National Highways; Transport in China
← G1811	→ G1813

The G1812 Cangzhou–Yulin Expressway (Chinese: 沧州—榆林高速公路), also referred to as the Cangyu Expressway (Chinese: 沧榆高速公路), is an expressway in China that connects Cangzhou, Hebei to Yulin, Shaanxi.

== Route ==
The expressway travels through the provinces of Hebei, Shanxi and Shaanxi.

=== Hebei ===
==== Cangzhou to Baoding ====
The section from Cangzhou to Baoding has a total length of 122.5 kilometers and was opened to traffic on 20 December 2007.

==== Baoding to Fuping ====
The Baoding to Fuping section has a total length of 147.28 kilometers and was opened to traffic on 7 December 2011.

=== Shanxi ===
==== Lingqiu to Xinfu ====
The section from Lingqiu to Xinfu District has a total length of 124 kilometers was opened to traffic on 6 December 2011.

==== Xinfu to Baode ====
The Xinfu to Baode section has a total length of 192 kilometers and was opened to traffic on 30 December 2011.

=== Shaanxi ===
==== Fugu to Shenmu ====
The section from Fugu County to Shenmu has a total length of 56.9 kilometers and was opened to traffic on 16 December 2011.

==== Shenmu to Yulin ====
The Shenmu to Yulin section has a total length of 88.98 kilometers and was opened to traffic on 8 December 2009.
