= China National Highway 107 =

Road in China

National Highway 107
- 107国道

Route information
- Length: 2,698 km (1,676 mi)

Major junctions
- From: Beijing
- To: Hong Kong

Location
- Country: China

Highway system
- National Trunk Highway System; Primary; Auxiliary
← G106	→ G108

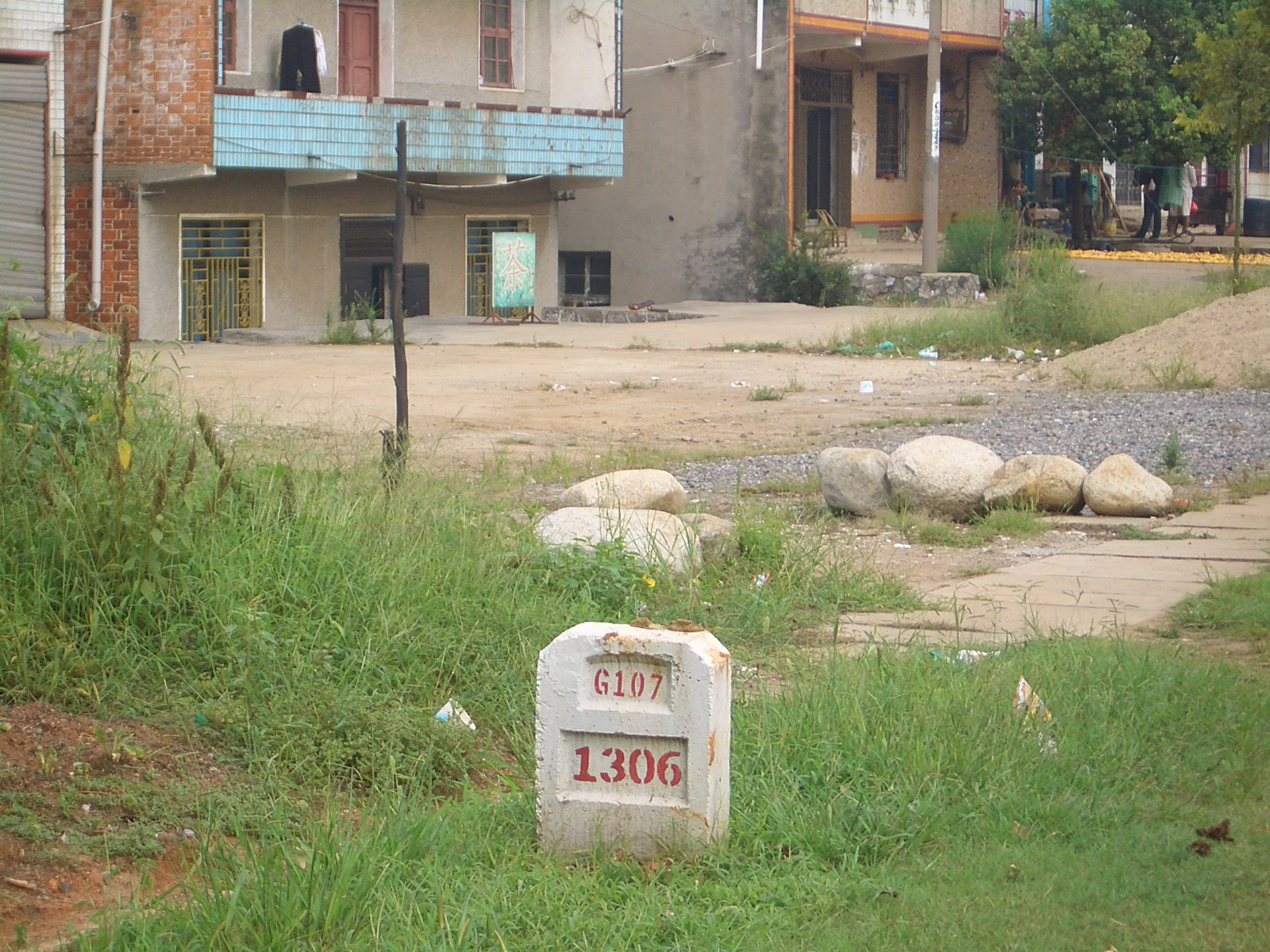
A kilometre marker on G107 in Xianning prefecture-level city, south of Wuhan

China's National Highway 107 runs from Beijing to Hong Kong SAR via Wuhan. It runs to approximately 2,698 km, and, on a map, runs broadly on a straight line from Beijing to Shenzhen. In 2013, under a new 2013-2030 plan by the National Development and Reform Commission and the Ministry of Transport, the G107 has been extended to Hong Kong.

In between, the highway runs parallel to national highways 105 and 106.

== Route and distance ==
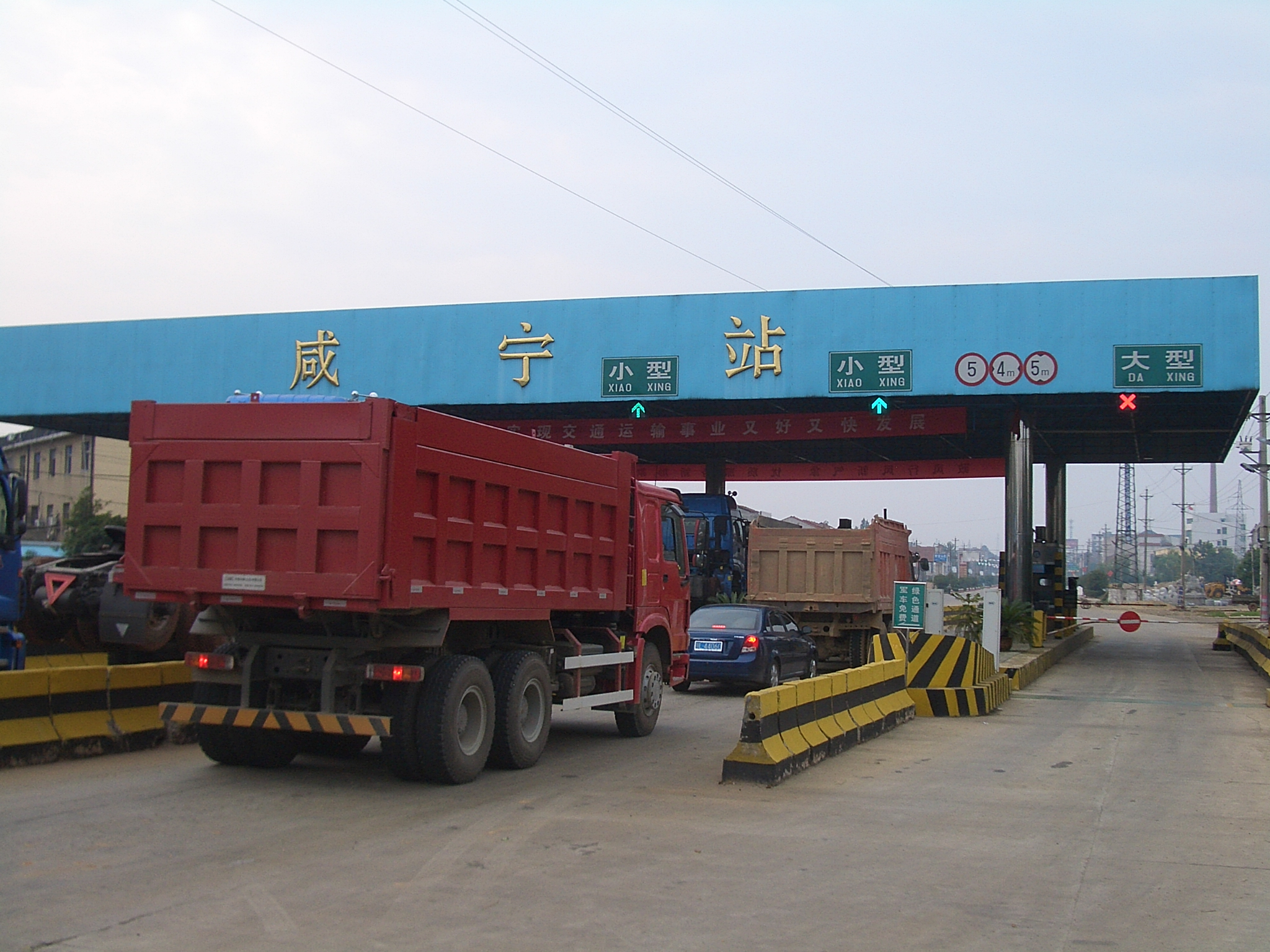
Toll gate in Xianning, Hubei

Route and distance

City	Distance (km)
Beijing, Beijing	0
Fangshan District, Beijing	24
Zhuozhou, Hebei	72
Gaobeidian, Hebei	97
Dingxing, Hebei	105
Xushui, Hebei	136
Baoding, Hebei	162
Wangdu, Hebei	196
Dingzhou, Hebei	225
Xinle, Hebei	261
Zhengding, Hebei	285
Shijiazhuang, Hebei	304
Gaoyi, Hebei	365
Xingtai, Hebei	437
Handan, Hebei	497
Ci County, Hebei	528
Anyang, Henan	558
Tangyin, Henan	580
Qi County, Hebi, Henan	620
Zhengzhou, Henan	753
Xinzheng, Henan	800
Changge, Henan	822
Xuchang, Henan	848
Linying, Henan	877
Luohe, Henan	907
Xiping, Henan	939
Suiping, Henan	969
Zhumadian, Henan	992
Queshan, Henan	1014
Xinyang, Henan	1096
Xiaochang, Hubei	1205
Xiaogan, Hubei	1256
Wuhan, Hubei	1333
Xianning, Hubei	1427
Chibi, Hubei	1476
Linxiang, Hunan	1535
Yueyang, Hunan	1580
Changsha, Hunan	1734
Xiangtan, Hunan	1784
Xiangtan County, Hunan	1793
Hengshan, Hunan	1859
Hengyang, Hunan	1925
Leiyang, Hunan	1992
Chenzhou, Hunan	2075
Yizhang, Hunan	2126
Lianzhou, Guangdong	2256
Yangshan County, Guangdong	2328
Qingxin, Guangdong	2451
Qingyuan, Guangdong	2454
Huadu, Guangdong	2502
Guangzhou, Guangdong	2529
Dongguan, Guangdong	2590
Bao'an, Guangdong	2656
Nanshan, Guangdong	2662
Shenzhen, Guangdong	2698

== See also ==
- China National Highways
- AH1
