= Fogang County =

Fogang 佛冈县 Fatkong
- County
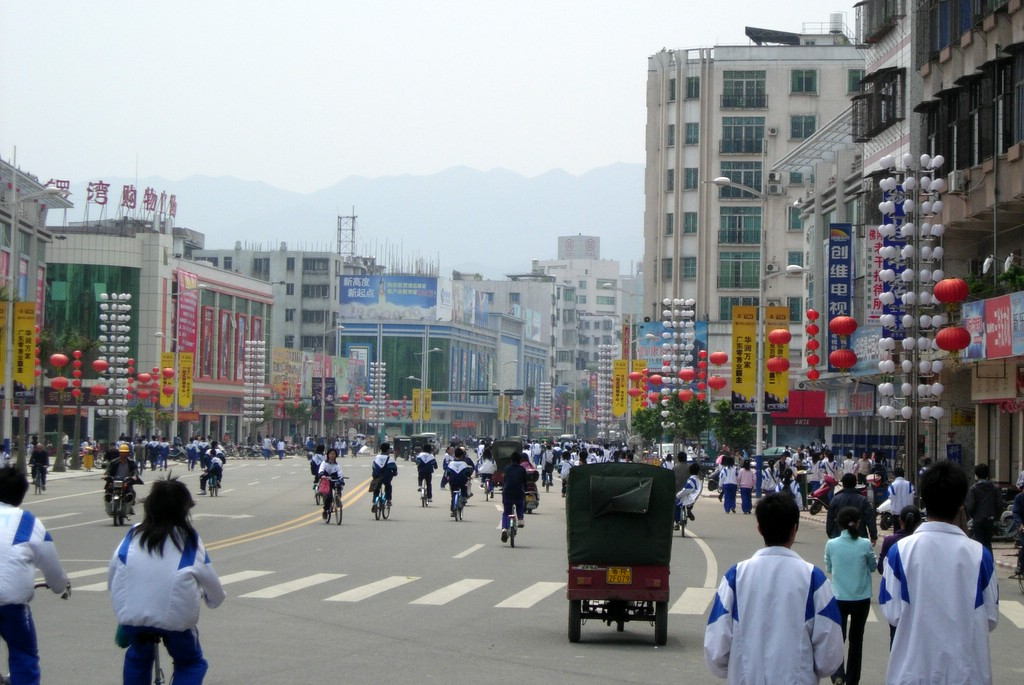
- Street 'Zhenxing' in Fogang

- Location of the seat in Guangdong
- Coordinates: 23.879°N 113.532°E
- Country: People's Republic of China
- Province: Guangdong
- Prefecture-level city: Qingyuan

Area
  - Total: 1,302 km^{2} (503 sq mi)

Population (2020)
  - Total: 315,502
  - Density: 242.3/km^{2} (627.6/sq mi)
- Time zone: UTC+8 (China Standard)
- Division code: FGY

Fogang County
- Simplified Chinese: 佛冈县
- Traditional Chinese: 佛岡縣
- Postal: Fatkong
Transcriptions
Standard Mandarin
- Hanyu Pinyin: Fógāng Xiàn
Yue: Cantonese
- Jyutping: fat^{6}gong^{1} jyun^{2}

Fogang County (Chinese: 佛冈县; pinyin: Fógāng Xiàn) is a county of north-central Guangdong province, People's Republic of China. It is under the administration of Qingyuan City, and is connected to major cities in Guangdong by public highways and toll roads. The closest aviation hub is Guangzhou Baiyun International Airport (CAN).

Fogang comprises a central township and numerous satellite villages, and has a total population of around 315,502. Agriculture remains a significant contributor to the County's economy, with fruits, vegetables and grains being grown by local farmers and entrepreneurs.

In recent years, the county has experienced steady growth in size and population, accompanied by rapid economic development. Industrial zones have been established outside the township, with textiles among the main factory products.

== Name ==
During the early years of the Republic of China, There was a place named Fogang hall, which belonged to Guangdong road. After three years, on June 3, taken to the county hall, the said Fogang County was established.

== History ==
Settings were abolished in 1920, Fogang County belonged to the bureau of the central appeasement jurisdiction over instead.

In 1928, problems arose from the Beijing Bureau. Fogang belonged to the second district of Guangdong Province Administrative Supervision Bureau as of July 1936.

It then belonged to the fifth district administrative office of the inspector. In 1946, the province set up four division district 13 district, Fogang District belonged to the same division.

In 1947, the entire province was divided into 11 special supervision areas, with Fogang belonging to the special supervision area.

Fogang County was liberated in 1949, Fogang Xianshu Beijing Temporary Administrative Committee (in April 1950, was renamed Beijing Commissioner's Office). On April 13, 1952, both Fogang county office and Conghua county offices, Fogang office only. Then in October, the county office, Fogang county was still the Beijing River special (renamed in 1953, Beijing Ombudsman North Guangdong Administrative Bureau, in 1956, was renamed to Administrative Bureau of Shaoguan). Then on October 23, 1958, Fogang county merged with Conghua county, to the said county, Conghua belongs to administrative bureau of Shaoguan. In January 1959, Conghua county ranks Foshan special jurisdiction, on April 11, 1960 and over in Guangzhou. On May 4, 1961, the original Buddha county jurisdiction demanded that Conghua county should separate, restore Fogang county organizational system.

On June 15, 1963, Fogang County ranks of Shaoguan zone. 20 years later, Fogang County, Guangzhou governed it at the time, However, as of January 7, 1988, Fogang county was governed by Qingyuan city, which still governs it today.

== Folkways ==
Tofu Festival is a festival that is celebrated each day of the first lunar month 13, Fogang County and Shegang Town village celebrate the festival.

== Language ==
Both the Cantonese and Hakka languages are spoken there.

== Tourism ==
Buddha mountain provincial nature reserve, the entry for Longtan mountain villa.

== Climate ==
Climate data for Fogang, elevation 97 m (318 ft), (1991–2020 normals, extremes 1963–2010)
Month	Jan	Feb	Mar	Apr	May	Jun	Jul	Aug	Sep	Oct	Nov	Dec	Year
Record high °C (°F)	28.0 (82.4)	29.8 (85.6)	33.2 (91.8)	33.6 (92.5)	35.3 (95.5)	38.4 (101.1)	39.8 (103.6)	38.0 (100.4)	37.0 (98.6)	36.5 (97.7)	34.1 (93.4)	29.0 (84.2)	39.8 (103.6)
Mean daily maximum °C (°F)	17.2 (63.0)	18.8 (65.8)	21.1 (70.0)	25.7 (78.3)	29.4 (84.9)	31.6 (88.9)	33.3 (91.9)	33.2 (91.8)	31.6 (88.9)	28.6 (83.5)	24.3 (75.7)	19.3 (66.7)	26.2 (79.1)
Daily mean °C (°F)	12.2 (54.0)	14.1 (57.4)	17.0 (62.6)	21.6 (70.9)	25.1 (77.2)	27.2 (81.0)	28.3 (82.9)	28.1 (82.6)	26.5 (79.7)	23.2 (73.8)	18.7 (65.7)	13.8 (56.8)	21.3 (70.4)
Mean daily minimum °C (°F)	8.9 (48.0)	11.0 (51.8)	14.1 (57.4)	18.7 (65.7)	22.1 (71.8)	24.4 (75.9)	25.1 (77.2)	24.8 (76.6)	23.1 (73.6)	19.5 (67.1)	14.9 (58.8)	10.3 (50.5)	18.1 (64.5)
Record low °C (°F)	−4.2 (24.4)	0.7 (33.3)	0.6 (33.1)	7.3 (45.1)	12.1 (53.8)	15.1 (59.2)	20.5 (68.9)	21.2 (70.2)	14.4 (57.9)	8.9 (48.0)	3.0 (37.4)	−1.3 (29.7)	−4.2 (24.4)
Average precipitation mm (inches)	68.7 (2.70)	75.3 (2.96)	161.3 (6.35)	252.7 (9.95)	373.2 (14.69)	462.2 (18.20)	243.2 (9.57)	231.0 (9.09)	144.6 (5.69)	53.1 (2.09)	54.7 (2.15)	53.6 (2.11)	2,173.6 (85.55)
Average precipitation days (≥ 0.1 mm)	9.0	11.8	17.3	17.7	19.4	20.8	17.4	17.1	11.4	5.5	6.8	6.7	160.9
Average snowy days	0.1	0	0	0	0	0	0	0	0	0	0	0	0.1
Average relative humidity (%)	71	76	81	82	82	84	81	81	78	70	69	67	77
Mean monthly sunshine hours	113.5	82.2	65.7	77.9	112.7	132.5	193.9	192.6	185.5	192.6	167.8	155.2	1,672.1
Percentage possible sunshine	34	26	18	20	27	33	47	48	51	54	51	47	38
Source: China Meteorological Administrationall-time record low
