= Suiping County =

Suiping County 遂平县
- County
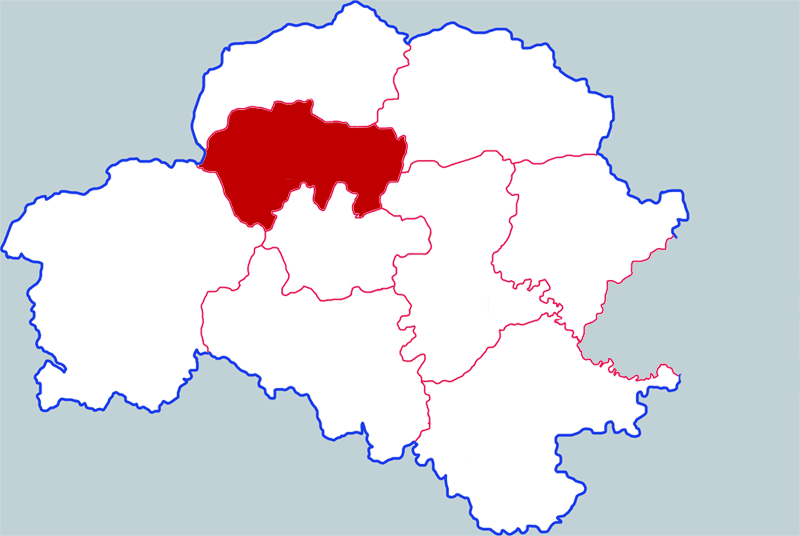
- Location of Suiping county in Zhumadian city, Henan, China

- Location of the seat in Henan
- Coordinates: 33°08′46″N 114°00′47″E
- Country: People's Republic of China
- Province: Henan
- Prefecture-level city: Zhumadian

Area
  - Total: 1,080 km^{2} (420 sq mi)

Population (2019)
  - Total: 431,700
  - Density: 400/km^{2} (1,040/sq mi)
- Time zone: UTC+8 (China Standard)
- Postal code: 463100

Suiping County (Chinese: 遂平县; pinyin: Suìpíng Xiàn) is a county in the south of Henan province, China. It is under the administration of Zhumadian City.

It is claimed to be the origin county of the surname Fang (房). During the Western Zhou it was the seat of the Fang State.

The Jixiashan Satellite Commune, established in 1958, was China's first People's commune. It is a "historical heritage site" and is a destination for red tourism.

== Administrative divisions ==
As of 2021, this county is divided to 5 subdistricts, 8 towns, 2 townships and 3 others.

Subdistricts

- Quyang Subdistrict (瞿阳街道)
- Chezhan Subdistrict (车站街道)
- Wufang Subdistrict (吴房街道)
- Lianhuahu Subdistrict (莲花湖街道)
- Chutang Subdistrict (褚堂街道)

Towns

- Yushan (玉山镇)
- Chakushan (查岈山镇)
- Shizhaipu (石寨铺镇)
- Hexing (和兴镇)
- Shenzhai (沈寨镇)
- Yangfeng (阳丰镇)
- Changzhuang (常庄镇)
- Huazhuang (花庄镇)

Townships

- Huaishu Township (槐树乡)
- Wencheng Township (文城乡)

Others

- Industrial Park (工业园区)
- Chaku Mountain Scenic Area (查岈山风景区)
- Fengming Valley Scenic Area (凤鸣谷风景区)

== Climate ==
Climate data for Suiping, elevation 65 m (213 ft), (1991–2020 normals, extremes 1981–present)
Month	Jan	Feb	Mar	Apr	May	Jun	Jul	Aug	Sep	Oct	Nov	Dec	Year
Record high °C (°F)	20.3 (68.5)	25.0 (77.0)	34.6 (94.3)	36.0 (96.8)	38.0 (100.4)	40.1 (104.2)	41.4 (106.5)	40.0 (104.0)	39.5 (103.1)	35.0 (95.0)	28.9 (84.0)	20.7 (69.3)	41.4 (106.5)
Mean daily maximum °C (°F)	6.2 (43.2)	9.7 (49.5)	16.1 (61.0)	22.2 (72.0)	27.7 (81.9)	31.9 (89.4)	32.1 (89.8)	31.0 (87.8)	27.0 (80.6)	22.3 (72.1)	15.2 (59.4)	8.8 (47.8)	20.9 (69.5)
Daily mean °C (°F)	0.9 (33.6)	4.0 (39.2)	9.9 (49.8)	15.6 (60.1)	21.3 (70.3)	25.9 (78.6)	27.2 (81.0)	26.0 (78.8)	21.2 (70.2)	16.1 (61.0)	9.5 (49.1)	3.2 (37.8)	15.1 (59.1)
Mean daily minimum °C (°F)	−3.1 (26.4)	−0.2 (31.6)	4.6 (40.3)	9.7 (49.5)	15.6 (60.1)	20.5 (68.9)	23.4 (74.1)	22.4 (72.3)	17.1 (62.8)	11.6 (52.9)	5.1 (41.2)	−0.9 (30.4)	10.5 (50.9)
Record low °C (°F)	−12.6 (9.3)	−14.2 (6.4)	−6.5 (20.3)	−0.2 (31.6)	3.7 (38.7)	11.5 (52.7)	17.2 (63.0)	14.3 (57.7)	9.2 (48.6)	0.8 (33.4)	−7.4 (18.7)	−13.8 (7.2)	−14.2 (6.4)
Average precipitation mm (inches)	21.0 (0.83)	23.9 (0.94)	42.7 (1.68)	49.6 (1.95)	75.8 (2.98)	117.5 (4.63)	195.3 (7.69)	136.8 (5.39)	83.1 (3.27)	57.6 (2.27)	42.2 (1.66)	18.7 (0.74)	864.2 (34.03)
Average precipitation days (≥ 0.1 mm)	5.8	6.3	7.1	6.9	9.3	8.6	11.3	11.4	9.3	7.7	6.8	5.1	95.6
Average snowy days	5.1	3.3	1.3	0.1	0	0	0	0	0	0	0.9	2.5	13.2
Average relative humidity (%)	70	70	70	71	70	69	80	83	78	72	72	70	73
Mean monthly sunshine hours	121.4	126.8	164.5	190.6	200.0	183.6	187.5	171.3	150.4	146.9	134.8	130.0	1,907.8
Percentage possible sunshine	38	41	44	49	46	43	43	42	41	42	43	42	43
Source: China Meteorological Administration
