= Wangdu County =

Wangdu County 望都县
- County
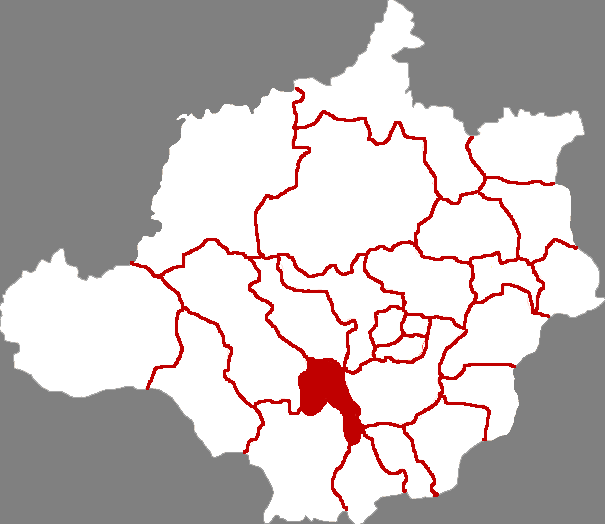
- Wangdu in Baoding

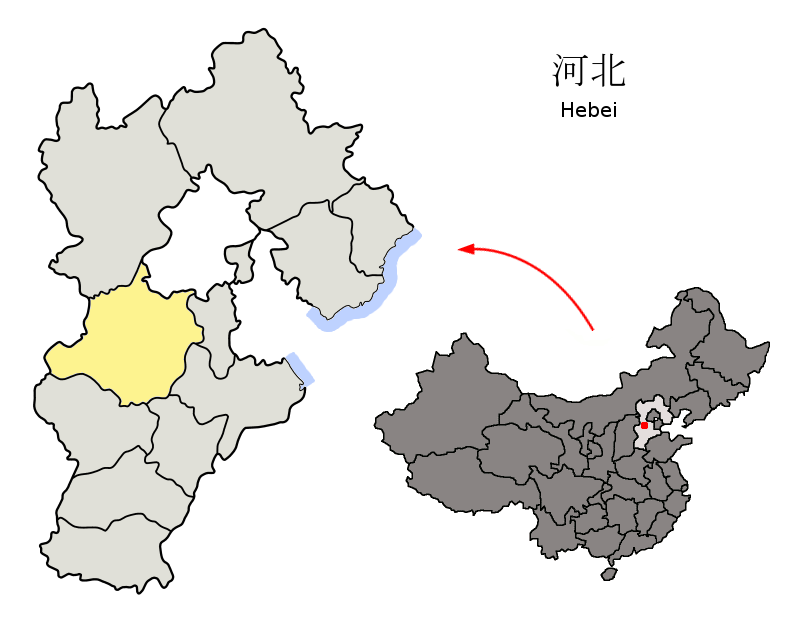
- Baoding in Hebei
- Coordinates: 38°41′45″N 115°09′16″E
- Country: People's Republic of China
- Province: Hebei
- Prefecture-level city: Baoding
- County seat: Wangdu Town (望都镇)

Area
  - Total: 357 km^{2} (138 sq mi)
- Elevation: 46 m (151 ft)

Population (2020 census)
  - Total: 233,790
  - Density: 655/km^{2} (1,700/sq mi)
- Time zone: UTC+8 (China Standard)

Wangdu (Chinese: 望都; pinyin: Wàngdū) is a county of west-central Hebei province, China, directly serviced by China National Highway 107. It is under the jurisdiction of the prefecture-level city of Baoding and has a population of 233,790 (2020) residing in an area of 357 km^{2} (138 sq mi).

== Administrative divisions ==
There are 2 towns and 6 townships under the county's administration.

Towns:

- Wangdu (望都镇), Gudian (固店镇)

Townships:

- Sizhuang Township (寺庄乡), Zhaozhuang Township (赵庄乡), Heibao Township (黑堡乡), Gaoling Township (高岭乡), Zhonghanzhuang Township (中韩庄乡), Jiacun Township (贾村乡)

== Climate ==
Climate data for Wangdu, elevation 48 m (157 ft), (1991–2020 normals, extremes 1981–2010)
Month	Jan	Feb	Mar	Apr	May	Jun	Jul	Aug	Sep	Oct	Nov	Dec	Year
Record high °C (°F)	17.0 (62.6)	22.6 (72.7)	30.4 (86.7)	32.6 (90.7)	36.5 (97.7)	41.0 (105.8)	41.9 (107.4)	35.6 (96.1)	34.5 (94.1)	32.1 (89.8)	24.5 (76.1)	19.2 (66.6)	41.9 (107.4)
Mean daily maximum °C (°F)	2.8 (37.0)	6.9 (44.4)	13.9 (57.0)	20.9 (69.6)	26.5 (79.7)	31.4 (88.5)	31.8 (89.2)	30.0 (86.0)	26.3 (79.3)	19.9 (67.8)	10.7 (51.3)	4.2 (39.6)	18.8 (65.8)
Daily mean °C (°F)	−4.0 (24.8)	0.0 (32.0)	7.1 (44.8)	14.3 (57.7)	20.1 (68.2)	25.0 (77.0)	26.7 (80.1)	24.9 (76.8)	19.8 (67.6)	13.1 (55.6)	4.5 (40.1)	−1.8 (28.8)	12.5 (54.5)
Mean daily minimum °C (°F)	−9.3 (15.3)	−5.6 (21.9)	0.6 (33.1)	7.5 (45.5)	13.3 (55.9)	18.8 (65.8)	22.0 (71.6)	20.6 (69.1)	14.5 (58.1)	7.7 (45.9)	−0.3 (31.5)	−6.4 (20.5)	7.0 (44.5)
Record low °C (°F)	−21.7 (−7.1)	−18.3 (−0.9)	−9.9 (14.2)	−3.9 (25.0)	1.9 (35.4)	8.4 (47.1)	15.4 (59.7)	12.4 (54.3)	3.3 (37.9)	−3.9 (25.0)	−17.7 (0.1)	−21.5 (−6.7)	−21.7 (−7.1)
Average precipitation mm (inches)	2.0 (0.08)	4.9 (0.19)	9.0 (0.35)	25.2 (0.99)	31.5 (1.24)	64.9 (2.56)	148.3 (5.84)	118.0 (4.65)	53.6 (2.11)	24.1 (0.95)	11.8 (0.46)	2.1 (0.08)	495.4 (19.5)
Average precipitation days (≥ 0.1 mm)	1.4	2.4	2.8	4.9	6.3	9.0	12.0	11.0	7.4	4.9	3.4	1.8	67.3
Average snowy days	2.3	2.4	1.1	0.2	0	0	0	0	0	0	1.5	2.5	10
Average relative humidity (%)	59	53	51	58	63	63	76	83	78	71	69	63	66
Mean monthly sunshine hours	162.3	166.2	214.5	236.6	262.6	219.6	180.1	186.9	189.7	180.2	158.1	160.0	2,316.8
Percentage possible sunshine	53	54	58	59	59	50	40	45	52	53	53	55	53
Source: China Meteorological Administration
