= Zaoyuan =

Zaoyuan is the name of several places in the People's Republic of China. It may refer to:

- Zaoyuan Township, Xingtai City, Hebei Province.
- Zaoyuan Station, Beijing Subway, Beijing.
- Zaoyuan Subdistrict, Zhangqiu Division, Jinan City, Shandong Province.
