= Dalian Subdistrict =

Dalian Subdistrict 褡裢街道
- Urban Subdistrict
- Dālián Jiēdào
- Location in Hebei Location in China
- Coordinates: 36°51′22″N 114°29′33″E
- Country: People's Republic of China
- Province: Hebei
- Prefecture-level city: Xingtai
- County-level city: Shahe

Area
  - Total: 16.70 km^{2} (6.45 sq mi)

Population (2010)
  - Total: 57,875
- Time zone: UTC+8 (China Standard)

Dalian Subdistrict (Chinese: 褡裢街道; pinyin: Dālián Jiēdào) is an urban subdistrict located in Shahe, Xingtai, Hebei, China. According to the 2010 census, Dalian Subdistrict had a population of 57,875, including 29,273 males and 28,602 females. The population was distributed as follows: 8,188 people aged under 14, 44,820 people aged between 15 and 64, and 4,867 people aged over 65.

== See also ==
- List of township-level divisions of Hebei
