= Chuiyang =

Chuiyang 垂杨镇
- Town
- Chuíyáng Zhèn
- Location in Hebei Location in China
- Coordinates: 37°12′13″N 115°34′06″E
- Country: People's Republic of China
- Province: Hebei
- Prefecture-level city: Xingtai
- County-level city: Nangong

Area
  - Total: 74.26 km^{2} (28.67 sq mi)

Population (2010)
  - Total: 41,567
  - Density: 559.8/km^{2} (1,450/sq mi)
- Time zone: UTC+8 (China Standard)

Chuiyang (Chinese: 垂杨镇; pinyin: Chuíyáng Zhèn) is a town located in Nangong, Xingtai, Hebei, China. According to the 2010 census, Chuiyang had a population of 41,567, including 21,074 males and 20,493 females. The population was distributed as follows: 6,673 people aged under 14, 32,063 people aged between 15 and 64, and 2,831 people aged over 65.

== See also ==
- List of township-level divisions of Hebei
