= Gaogongzhuang Township =

Gaogongzhuang Township 高公庄乡
- Rural Township
- Gāogōngzhuāng Xiāng
- Location in Hebei Location in China
- Coordinates: 37°13′10″N 115°21′17″E
- Country: People's Republic of China
- Province: Hebei
- Prefecture-level city: Xingtai
- County: Wei County

Area
  - Total: 55.49 km^{2} (21.42 sq mi)

Population (2010)
  - Total: 30,166
  - Density: 543.6/km^{2} (1,408/sq mi)
- Time zone: UTC+8 (China Standard)

Gaogongzhuang Township (Chinese: 高公庄乡; pinyin: Gāogōngzhuāng Xiāng) is a rural township located in Wei County, Xingtai, Hebei, China. According to the 2010 census, Gaogongzhuang Township had a population of 30,166, including 15,396 males and 14,770 females. The population was distributed as follows: 5,025 people aged under 14, 23,043 people aged between 15 and 64, and 2,098 people aged over 65.

== See also ==
- List of township-level divisions of Hebei
