= Guocun =

Guocun ("Guo Village") may refer to either of two unrelated Chinese towns:

- Guocun, Shanxi (郭村镇, Guōcūn Zhèn), in Qin County
- Guocun, Hebei (崞村镇, Guōcūn Zhèn), in Xuanhua County
- Dongguocun Township (东郭村乡, Dōngguōcūn Xiāng) in Hebei appears to mean "East Guocun", but in fact Dongguo (lit. "Eastern Wall") is an uncommon surname.
