= Wei Lijie =

Wei Lijie may refer to:

- Wei Lijie (table tennis) (魏力捷)
- Wei Lijie (scientist) (韦利杰)
