= Gengzhuangqiao =

Gengzhuangqiao 耿庄桥镇
- Town
- Gěngzhuāngqiáo Zhèn
- Location in Hebei Location in China
- Coordinates: 37°26′43″N 114°58′49″E
- Country: People's Republic of China
- Province: Hebei
- Prefecture-level city: Xingtai
- County: Ningjin

Area
  - Total: 138.2 km^{2} (53.4 sq mi)

Population (2010)
  - Total: 57,617
  - Density: 416.8/km^{2} (1,080/sq mi)
- Time zone: UTC+8 (China Standard)

Gengzhuangqiao (Chinese: 耿庄桥镇; pinyin: Gěngzhuāngqiáo Zhèn) is a town located in Ningjin County, Xingtai, Hebei, China. According to the 2010 census, Gengzhuangqiao had a population of 57,617, including 28,913 males and 28,704 females. The population was distributed as follows: 11,625 people aged under 14, 40,641 people aged between 15 and 64, and 5,351 people aged over 65.

== See also ==
- List of township-level divisions of Hebei
