= Dagaocun =

Dagaocun 大高村镇
- Town
- Dàgāocūn Zhèn
- Location in Hebei Location in China
- Coordinates: 37°16′59″N 115°28′55″E
- Country: People's Republic of China
- Province: Hebei
- Prefecture-level city: Xingtai
- County-level city: Nangong

Area
  - Total: 52.65 km^{2} (20.33 sq mi)

Population (2010)
  - Total: 21,344
  - Density: 405.4/km^{2} (1,050/sq mi)
- Time zone: UTC+8 (China Standard)

Dagaocun (Chinese: 大高村镇; pinyin: Dàgāocūn Zhèn) is a town located in Nangong, Xingtai, Hebei, China. According to the 2010 census, Dagaocun had a population of 21,344, including 10,677 males and 10,667 females. The population was distributed as follows: 2,669 people aged under 14, 16,990 people aged between 15 and 64, and 1,685 people aged over 65.

== See also ==
- List of township-level divisions of Hebei
