= XNT =

XNT, or xnt, may refer to:

- XNT, the IATA code for Xingtai Dalian Airport, Hebei Province, China
- xnt, the ISO 639-3 code for the Narragansett language in Rhode Island, United States
