= Julu =

Julu may refer to:

- Julu Commandery (鉅鹿郡), within present-day Xingtai Prefecture, Hebei
- Julu County (Han Dynasty) (鉅鹿縣), now Pingxiang County, Xingtai, Hebei
- Julu (ancient town) (巨鹿), now in Pingxiang County, Xingtai, Hebei
  - Battle of Julu
- Julu (modern town) (巨鹿镇), in Julu County, Xingtai, Hebei
- Julu County (巨鹿县), a present-day county in Xingtai, Hebei
