= Li Hongming =

Chinese politician

- 李宏鸣

Chairman of Huishang Bank
- In office June 2013 – November 2020
- Preceded by: Wang Xiaoxin
- Succeeded by: Wu Xuemin

Communist Party Secretary of Suzhou
- In office February 2008 – June 2013
- Preceded by: Tang Chengpei
- Succeeded by: Zhang Shuguang

Personal details
- Born: September 1957 (age 69) Julu County, Hebei, China
- Party: Chinese Communist Party (1976–2023; expelled)
- Education: Hefei University of Technology

Chinese name
- Simplified Chinese: 李宏鸣
- Traditional Chinese: 李宏鳴
Transcriptions
Standard Mandarin
- Hanyu Pinyin: Lǐ Hóngmíng

Li Hongming (Chinese: 李宏鸣; born September 1957) is a former Chinese politician who spent his entire career in north China's Anhui province. He was investigated by China's top anti-graft agency in November 2022. Previously he served as chairperson of Agriculture and Rural Committee of Anhui Provincial People's Congress.

Li was a representative of the 18th National Congress of the Chinese Communist Party. He was a delegate to the 11th National People's Congress.

== Early life and education ==
Li was born in Julu County, Hebei, in September 1957, and graduated from Hefei University of Technology in 1982. He also studied at the University of Science and Technology of China.

== Career ==
Li entered the workforce in April 1975, and joined the Chinese Communist Party (CCP) in August 1976. He assumed various posts in Anhui Provincial Government for a long time. In September 2003, he became mayor of Huangshan City. He was appointed party secretary of Suzhou in February 2008, concurrently serving as chairperson of its People's Congress. He was party secretary of Huishang Bank in June 2013, in addition to serving as chairman. In January 2018, he was chosen as chairperson of Agriculture and Rural Committee of Anhui Provincial People's Congress, serving in the post until his retirement in November 2020.

== Investigation ==
On 4 November 2022, Li was put under investigation for alleged "serious violations of discipline and laws" by the Central Commission for Discipline Inspection (CCDI), the party's internal disciplinary body, and the National Supervisory Commission, the highest anti-corruption agency of China. Up to now, the three chairmen of the Huishang Bank, Dai Hedi (戴荷娣), Li Hongming and Wu Xuemin (吴学民), have all sacked for graft.

On 27 April 2023, Li was expelled from the CCP. On May 23, he was arrested by the Anhui Provincial People's Procuratorate.

On 24 May 2024, Li was sentenced to 14 years and 6 months and fined 4 million yuan for taking bribes and abuse of power by Huaibei Intermediate People's Court. All property gained from the bribery would be turned over to the national treasury.

Party political offices
Preceded by Tang Chengpei	Communist Party Secretary of Suzhou; 2008–2013	Succeeded by Zhang Shuguang
Business positions
Preceded by Wang Xiaoxin (王晓昕)	Chairman of Huishang Bank; 2013–2020	Succeeded by Wu Xuemin (吴学民)
