= Changtun Township =

Changtun Township 常屯乡
- Rural Township
- Chángtún Xiāng
- Location in Hebei Location in China
- Coordinates: 37°04′27″N 115°28′32″E
- Country: People's Republic of China
- Province: Hebei
- Prefecture-level city: Xingtai
- County: Wei

Area
  - Total: 79.22 km^{2} (30.59 sq mi)

Population (2010)
  - Total: 31,956
  - Density: 403.4/km^{2} (1,045/sq mi)
- Time zone: UTC+8 (China Standard)

Changtun Township (Chinese: 常屯乡; pinyin: Chángtún Xiāng) is a rural township located in Wei County, Xingtai, Hebei, China. According to the 2010 census, Changtun Township had a population of 31,956, including 16,354 males and 15,602 females. The population was distributed as follows: 6,150 people aged under 14, 23,606 people aged between 15 and 64, and 2,200 people aged over 65.

== See also ==
- List of township-level divisions of Hebei
