= Longyao =

Longyao may refer to:

- Dragon kiln, a traditional kiln used for Chinese ceramics
- Longyao County, a county in southern Hebei, China, under the administration of Xingtai
  - Longyao Town, in Longyao County
