= Beihezhuang =

Beihezhuang 北河庄镇
- Town
- Běihézhuāng Zhèn
- Location in Hebei Location in China
- Coordinates: 37°33′41″N 114°51′57″E
- Country: People's Republic of China
- Province: Hebei
- Prefecture-level city: Xingtai
- County: Ningjin

Area
  - Total: 60.21 km^{2} (23.25 sq mi)

Population (2010)
  - Total: 50,251
  - Density: 834.6/km^{2} (2,162/sq mi)
- Time zone: UTC+8 (China Standard)

Beihezhuang (Chinese: 北河庄镇; pinyin: Běihézhuāng Zhèn) is a town located in Ningjin County, Xingtai, Hebei, China. According to the 2010 census, Beihezhuang had a population of 50,251, including 25,699 males and 24,552 females. The population was distributed as follows: 9,337 people aged under 14, 36,833 people aged between 15 and 64, and 4,081 people aged over 65.

== See also ==
- List of township-level divisions of Hebei
