= Duanlutou =

Duanlutou 段芦头镇
- Town
- Duànlútóu Zhèn
- Location in Hebei Location in China
- Coordinates: 37°10′45″N 115°40′28″E
- Country: People's Republic of China
- Province: Hebei
- Prefecture-level city: Xingtai
- County-level city: Nangong

Area
  - Total: 89.63 km^{2} (34.61 sq mi)

Population (2010)
  - Total: 53,364
  - Density: 595.4/km^{2} (1,542/sq mi)
- Time zone: UTC+8 (China Standard)

Duanlutou (Chinese: 段芦头镇; pinyin: Duànlútóu Zhèn) is a town located in Nangong, Xingtai, Hebei, China. According to the 2010 census, Duanlutou had a population of 53,364, including 27,174 males and 26,190 females. The population was distributed as follows: 9,030 people aged under 14, 40,399 people aged between 15 and 64, and 3,935 people aged over 65.

== See also ==
- List of township-level divisions of Hebei
