= Baixiang =

Baixiang may refer to the following Chinese places:

- Baixiang County (柏乡县), a county in Hebei Province, China
- Baixiang, Yueyang (柏祥镇), a town of Yueyang County, Hunan Province
