= Xindu, Xingtai =

District in Hebei, China

Coordinates: 37°03′00″N 114°28′02″E

Xindu 信都区
- District
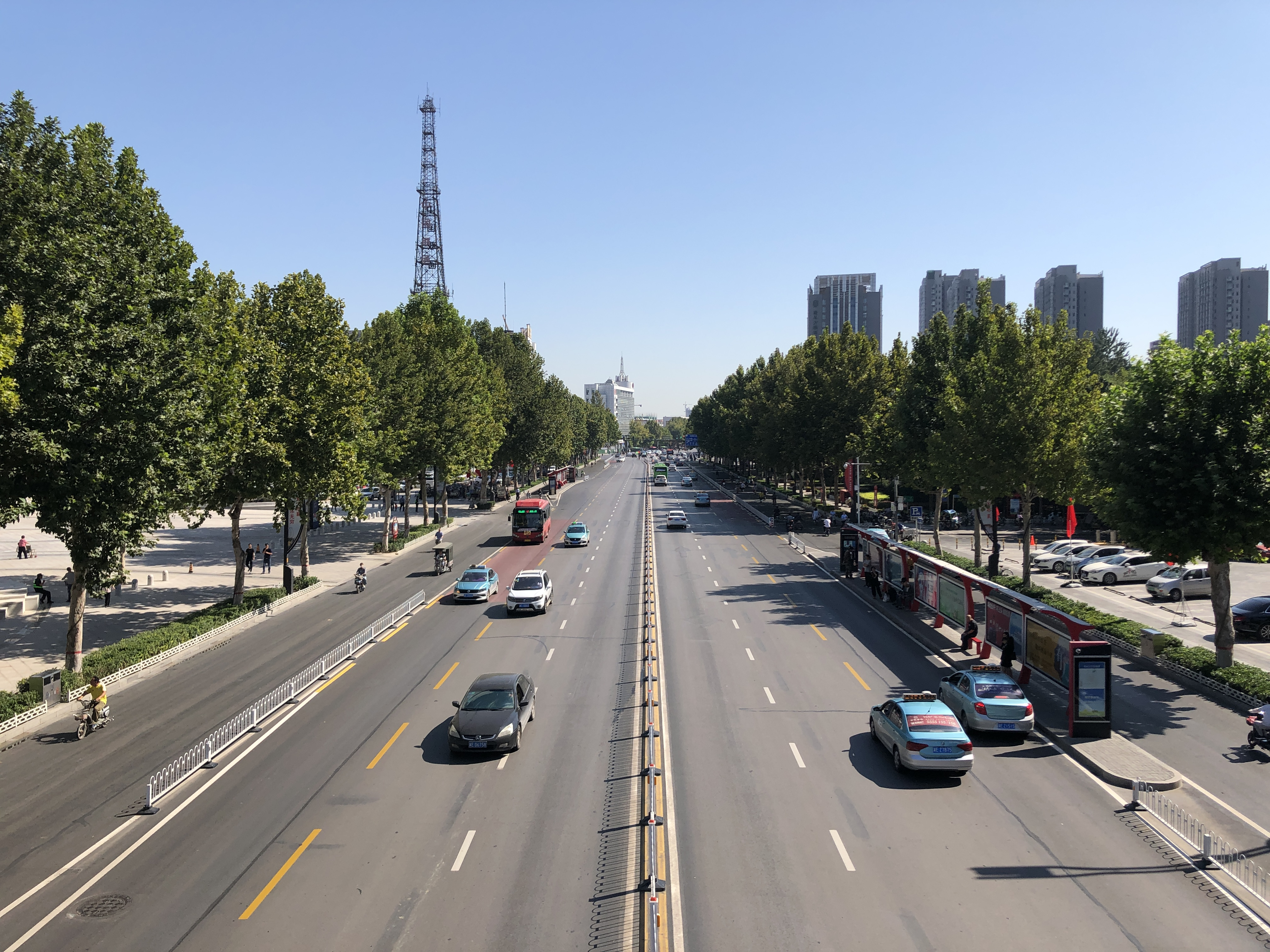
- Zhongxing West Street

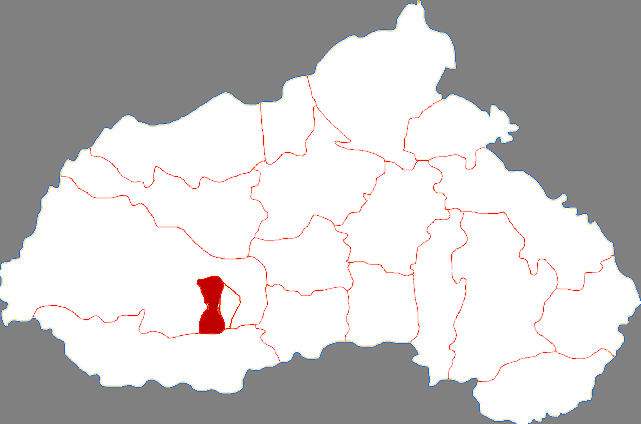
- Xindu in Xingtai

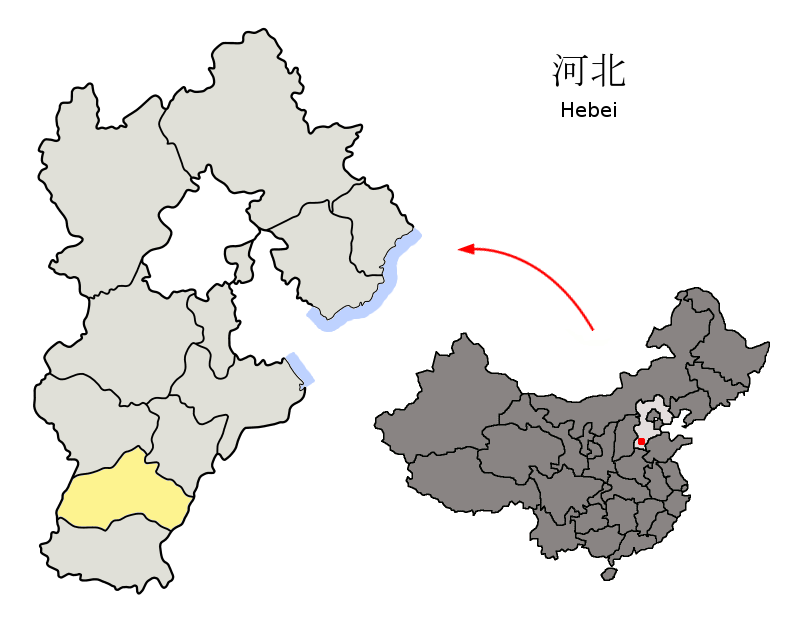
- Xingtai in Hebei
- Country: People's Republic of China
- Province: Hebei
- Prefecture-level city: Xingtai
- Time zone: UTC+8 (China Standard)

Xindu District (simplified Chinese: 信都区; traditional Chinese: 信都區; pinyin: Xìndū Qū) is one of two core districts of the city of Xingtai, Hebei province, China, the other being Xiangdu District.

== Administrative divisions ==
Subdistricts:

- Gangtie Road Subdistrict (钢铁路街道), Zhongxing Road Subdistrict (中兴路街道), Dahuoquan Subdistrict (达活泉街道), Zhangkuan Subdistrict (张宽街道), Zhangcun Subdistrict (章村街道)

Townships:

- Nandaguo Township (南大郭乡), Licun Township (李村乡)
