= Dalucun =

Dalucun 大陆村镇
- Town
- Dàlùcūn Zhèn
- Location in Hebei Location in China
- Coordinates: 37°39′55″N 115°02′48″E
- Country: People's Republic of China
- Province: Hebei
- Prefecture-level city: Xingtai
- County: Ningjin

Area
  - Total: 60.56 km^{2} (23.38 sq mi)

Population (2010)
  - Total: 45,338
  - Density: 748.6/km^{2} (1,939/sq mi)
- Time zone: UTC+8 (China Standard)

Dalucun (Chinese: 大陆村镇; pinyin: Dàlùcūn Zhèn) is a town located in Ningjin County, Xingtai, Hebei, China. According to the 2010 census, Dalucun had a population of 45,338, including 22,913 males and 22,425 females. The population was distributed as follows: 8,806 people aged under 14, 33,057 people aged between 15 and 64, and 3,475 people aged over 65.

== See also ==
- List of township-level divisions of Hebei
