= Cejing Township =

Cejing Township 册井乡
- Rural Township
- Cèjǐng Xiāng
- Location in Hebei Location in China
- Coordinates: 36°52′30″N 114°08′13″E
- Country: People's Republic of China
- Province: Hebei
- Prefecture-level city: Xingtai
- County-level city: Shahe

Area
  - Total: 66.67 km^{2} (25.74 sq mi)

Population (2010)
  - Total: 25,754
  - Density: 386.3/km^{2} (1,001/sq mi)
- Time zone: UTC+8 (China Standard)

Cejing Township (Chinese: 册井乡; pinyin: Cèjǐng Xiāng) is a rural township located in Shahe, Xingtai, Hebei, China. According to the 2010 census, Cejing Township had a population of 25,754, including 12,874 males and 12,880 females. The population was distributed as follows: 5,876 people aged under 14, 18,240 people aged between 15 and 64, and 1,638 people aged over 65.

== See also ==
- List of township-level divisions of Hebei
