= Dahuoquan Subdistrict =

Dahuoquan Subdistrict 达活泉街道
- Urban Subdistrict
- Dáhuóquán Jiēdào
- Location in Hebei Location in China
- Coordinates: 37°04′46″N 114°28′37″E
- Country: People's Republic of China
- Province: Hebei
- Prefecture-level city: Xingtai
- District: Xindou

Area
  - Total: 6.405 km^{2} (2.473 sq mi)

Population (2010)
  - Total: 35,809
- Time zone: UTC+8 (China Standard)

Dahuoquan Subdistrict (Chinese: 达活泉街道; pinyin: Dáhuóquán Jiēdào) is an urban subdistrict located in Xindou District, Xingtai, Hebei, China. According to the 2010 census, Dahuoquan Subdistrict had a population of 35,809, including 18,047 males and 17,762 females. The population was distributed as follows: 5,360 people aged under 14, 28,570 people aged between 15 and 64, and 1,879 people aged over 65.

== See also ==
- List of township-level divisions of Hebei
