= Daliangzhuang Township =

Daliangzhuang Township 大梁庄乡
- Rural Township
- Dàliángzhuāng Xiāng
- Location in Hebei Location in China
- Coordinates: 37°03′45″N 114°32′03″E
- Country: People's Republic of China
- Province: Hebei
- Prefecture-level city: Xingtai
- District: Xiangdu

Area
  - Total: 8.290 km^{2} (3.201 sq mi)

Population (2010)
  - Total: 22,838
- Time zone: UTC+8 (China Standard)

Daliangzhuang Township (Chinese: 大梁庄乡; pinyin: Dàliángzhuāng Xiāng) is a rural township located in Xiangdu District, Xingtai, Hebei, China. According to the 2010 census, Daliangzhuang Township had a population of 22,838, including 11,570 males and 11,268 females. The population was distributed as follows: 3,524 people aged under 14, 17,983 people aged between 15 and 64, and 1,331 people aged over 65.

== See also ==
- List of township-level divisions of Hebei
