= Damengcun =

Damengcun 大孟村镇
- Town
- Dàmèngcūn Zhèn
- Location in Hebei Location in China
- Coordinates: 37°13′35″N 114°28′21″E
- Country: People's Republic of China
- Province: Hebei
- Prefecture-level city: Xingtai
- County: Neiqiu

Area
  - Total: 78.44 km^{2} (30.29 sq mi)

Population (2010)
  - Total: 32,542
  - Density: 414.9/km^{2} (1,075/sq mi)
- Time zone: UTC+8 (China Standard)

Damengcun (Chinese: 大孟村镇; pinyin: Dàmèngcūn Zhèn) is a town located in Neiqiu County, Xingtai, Hebei, China. According to the 2010 census, Damengcun had a population of 32,542, including 16,354 males and 16,188 females. The population was distributed as follows: 6,242 people aged under 14, 24,263 people aged between 15 and 64, and 2,037 people aged over 65.

== See also ==
- List of township-level divisions of Hebei
