= Xingtai Dalian Airport =

Xingtai Dalian Airport 邢台褡裢机场
- IATA: XNT; ICAO: ZBXT

Summary
- Airport type: Public / military
- Serves: Xingtai, Hebei
- Location: Dalian Subdistrict, Shahe, Hebei
- Coordinates: 36°52′58″N 114°25′45″E

Map
- Location of airport in Hebei

Runways
Direction	Length		Surface
Direction	m	ft	Surface
17/35	2,600	8,530

Xingtai Dalian Airport
- Simplified Chinese: 邢台褡裢机场
- Traditional Chinese: 邢臺褡褳機場
Transcriptions
Standard Mandarin
- Hanyu Pinyin: Xíngtái Dālián Jīchǎng

Xingtai Dalian Airport (IATA: XNT, ICAO: ZBXT) is an airport serving Xingtai, Hebei, China. It is located in Shahe, 15 kilometers from the city center. It is mainly a military airport, but also served commercial flights between 1993 and 2001.

In 2011, the Civil Aviation Administration of China approved a 300 million yuan expansion plan for the airport, and it was expected to resume commercial service within five years. Before this airport, the city was served by nearby Jinan Yaoqiang International Airport and Shijiazhuang Zhengding International Airport.

In December 2023, the airport passed industry acceptance and airport license review. The airport reopened on July 18, 2024.

== Airlines and destinations ==
Airlines	Destinations
China Southern Airlines	Guangzhou
Hainan Airlines	Haikou, Harbin
Lucky Air	Chengdu–Tianfu, Kunming
Suparna Airlines	Shanghai–Pudong

== See also ==
- List of airports in China
- List of the busiest airports in China
