= Xing Prefecture (Hebei) =

Prefecture of imperial China

Xingzhou or Xing Prefecture (Chinese: 邢州) was a zhou (prefecture) in imperial China centering in modern Xingtai, Hebei, China. It existed (intermittently) from 596 to 1262.
