= Dongguocun =

Dongguocun 东郭村镇
- Town
- Location in Hebei
- Coordinates: 37°02′08″N 114°30′00″E
- Country: People's Republic of China
- Province: Hebei
- Prefecture-level city: Xingtai
- District: Qiaodong
- Village-level divisions: 11 residential communities 2 villages
- Elevation: 73 m (240 ft)
- Time zone: UTC+8 (China Standard)
- Postal code: 054001
- Area code: 0319

Dongguocun (simplified Chinese: 东郭村; traditional Chinese: 東郭村; pinyin: Dōngguōcūn) is a town of Qiaodong District in the southern outskirts of Xingtai, Hebei, People's Republic of China. The name appears to mean "East Guo Village Township", but in fact "Dongguo" (lit. "Eastern Wall") is a separate (and uncommon) Chinese surname. As of 2011, it has 11 residential communities (社区) and 2 villages under its administration.

== See also ==
- List of township-level divisions of Hebei
