= Neiqiu County =

Neiqiu County 内丘县 Neikiu
- County
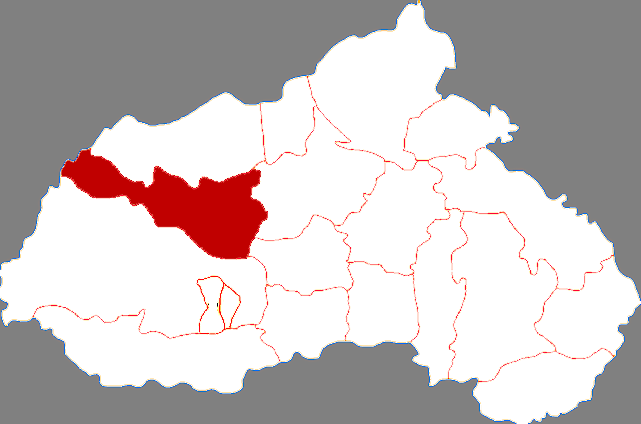
- Neiqiu in Xingtai

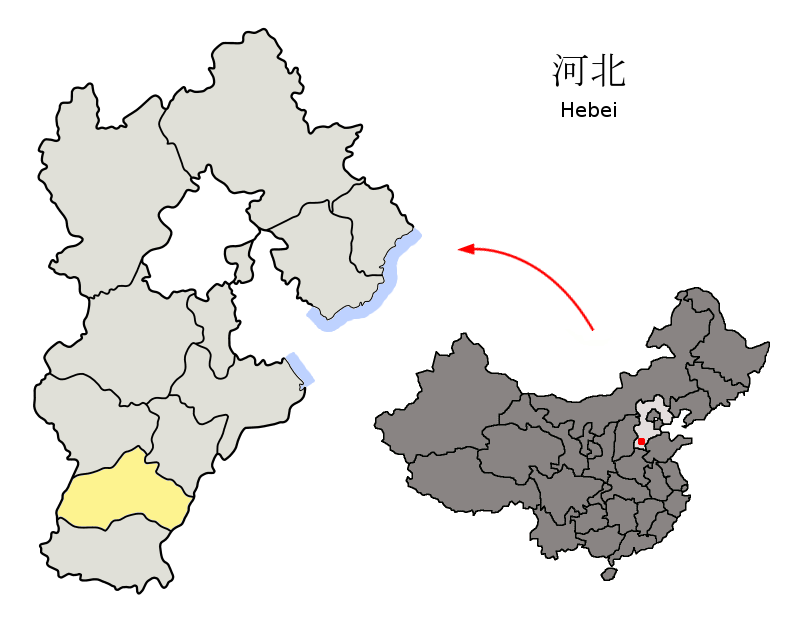
- Xingtai in Hebei
- Coordinates: 37°17′13″N 114°30′43″E
- Country: People's Republic of China
- Province: Hebei
- Prefecture-level city: Xingtai
- County seat: Neiqiu Town (内丘镇)

Area
  - Total: 775 km^{2} (299 sq mi)
- Elevation: 79 m (259 ft)

Population
  - Total: 260,000
  - Density: 340/km^{2} (870/sq mi)
- Time zone: UTC+8 (China Standard)
- Postal code: 054200
- Website: hbnq.gov.cn

Neiqiu County (simplified Chinese: 内丘县; traditional Chinese: 內邱縣; pinyin: Nèiqiū Xiàn, old postal name Neikiu) is a county in southwest of Hebei province, People's Republic of China, bordering Shanxi province to the west. It is under the administration of the prefecture-level city of Xingtai and has a land area of 775 square kilometres (299 sq mi), and a population of 260,000. The county seat is located in Neiqiu Town.

== Administrative divisions ==
Neiqiu consists of five towns and four townships.

Towns:

- Neiqiu (内丘镇), Damengcun (大孟村镇), Jindian (金店镇), Guanzhuang (官庄镇), Liulin (柳林镇)

Townships:

- Wuguodian Township (五郭店乡), Nanzhai Township (南赛乡), Zhangmao Township (獐獏乡), Houjiazhuang Township (侯家庄乡)

== Climate ==
Climate data for Neiqiu, elevation 164 m (538 ft), (1991–2020 normals, extremes 1981–present)
Month	Jan	Feb	Mar	Apr	May	Jun	Jul	Aug	Sep	Oct	Nov	Dec	Year
Record high °C (°F)	20.2 (68.4)	27.3 (81.1)	33.7 (92.7)	34.1 (93.4)	41.5 (106.7)	42.2 (108.0)	41.4 (106.5)	36.7 (98.1)	37.4 (99.3)	33.5 (92.3)	27.1 (80.8)	23.0 (73.4)	42.2 (108.0)
Mean daily maximum °C (°F)	3.6 (38.5)	7.9 (46.2)	14.9 (58.8)	21.6 (70.9)	27.3 (81.1)	32.3 (90.1)	32.1 (89.8)	30.2 (86.4)	26.7 (80.1)	20.9 (69.6)	11.9 (53.4)	5.1 (41.2)	19.5 (67.2)
Daily mean °C (°F)	−2.9 (26.8)	1.0 (33.8)	8.0 (46.4)	15.0 (59.0)	20.9 (69.6)	25.9 (78.6)	27.0 (80.6)	25.2 (77.4)	20.5 (68.9)	14.1 (57.4)	5.5 (41.9)	−1.1 (30.0)	13.3 (55.9)
Mean daily minimum °C (°F)	−7.9 (17.8)	−4.4 (24.1)	1.7 (35.1)	8.2 (46.8)	14.0 (57.2)	19.5 (67.1)	22.4 (72.3)	20.9 (69.6)	15.3 (59.5)	8.4 (47.1)	0.4 (32.7)	−5.6 (21.9)	7.7 (45.9)
Record low °C (°F)	−21.4 (−6.5)	−23.1 (−9.6)	−10.6 (12.9)	−4.0 (24.8)	1.9 (35.4)	8.6 (47.5)	14.5 (58.1)	11.6 (52.9)	4.5 (40.1)	−4.5 (23.9)	−14.7 (5.5)	−20.7 (−5.3)	−23.1 (−9.6)
Average precipitation mm (inches)	2.8 (0.11)	5.3 (0.21)	8.3 (0.33)	26.7 (1.05)	41.2 (1.62)	52.8 (2.08)	157.3 (6.19)	135.8 (5.35)	55.0 (2.17)	24.4 (0.96)	14.3 (0.56)	3.0 (0.12)	526.9 (20.75)
Average precipitation days (≥ 0.1 mm)	1.9	2.8	2.6	5.5	6.3	8.5	11.1	10.3	7.4	5.2	3.7	2.2	67.5
Average snowy days	2.8	2.9	1.1	0.2	0	0	0	0	0	0	1.5	2.6	11.1
Average relative humidity (%)	60	56	52	57	60	59	75	81	75	67	67	64	64
Mean monthly sunshine hours	142.6	157.8	208.7	231.0	255.4	219.0	181.9	195.2	182.5	179.0	144.2	143.3	2,240.6
Percentage possible sunshine	46	51	56	58	58	50	41	47	50	52	48	48	50
Source: China Meteorological Administration all-time January high
