= Wei Lijie (scientist) =

Chinese paleontologist

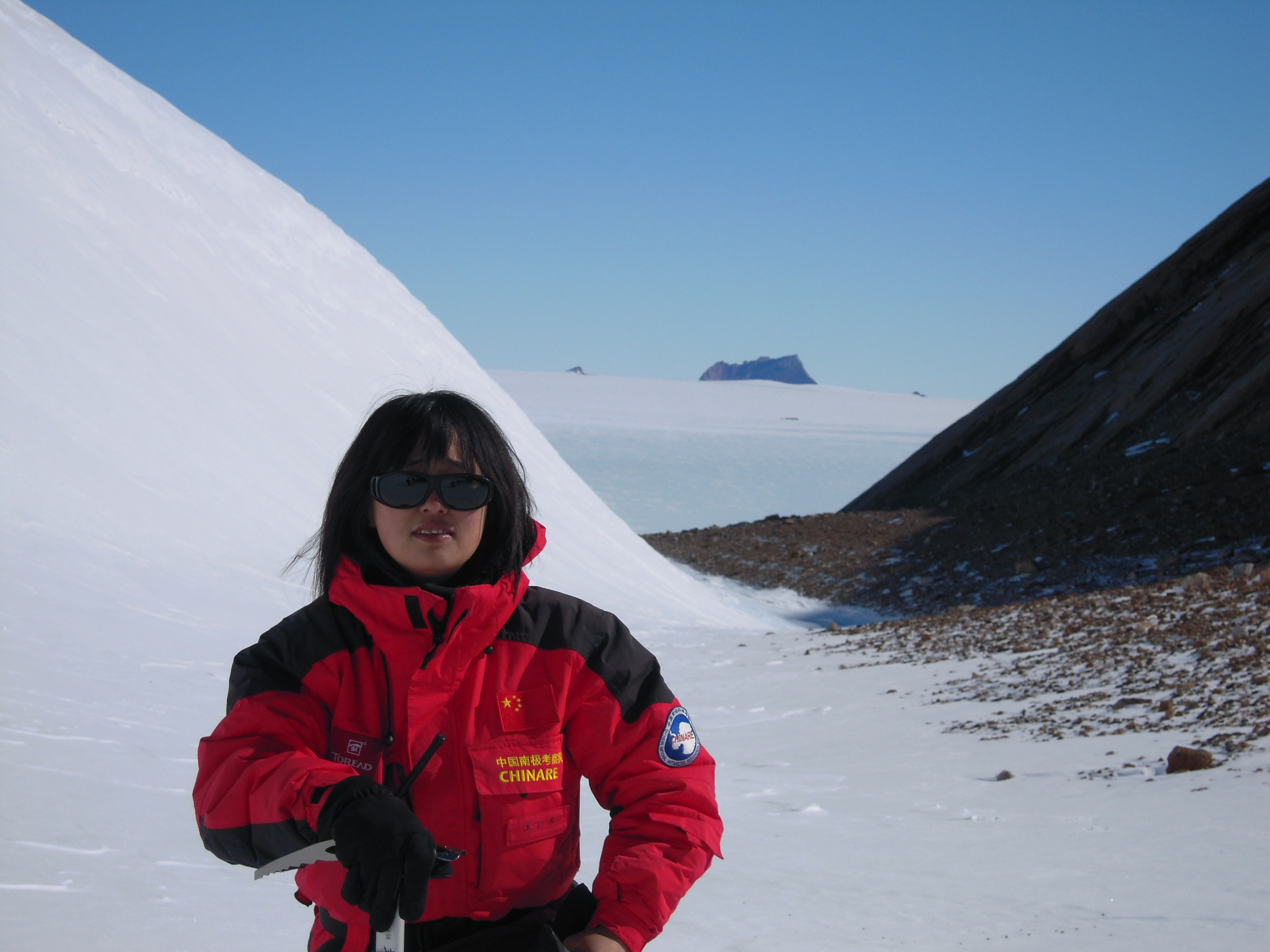
- Wei in 2010
- Born: June 2, 1974 (age 52); Xingtai, Hebei, China
- Education: Institute of Tibetan Plateau Research, Chinese Academy of Sciences
- Scientific career
- Fields: Paleontology; Stratigraphy
- Workplaces: Institute of Geomechanics, Chinese Academy of Geological Sciences

Wei Lijie (Chinese: 韦利杰; born 2 June 1974) is a Chinese Antarctic researcher, best known for her work on the paleontology and stratigraphy of Tibet and the Antarctic.

== Early life and education ==
Wei is from China and was born in Longyao, Hebei on June 2, 1974. She received her master's degree in paleontology and stratigraphy at Lanzhou University in 2006 and got her doctor degree in structural geology at the Institute of Tibetan Plateau Research, Chinese Academy of Sciences in 2011.

== Career and impact ==
Wei has been an Associate Professor in the Institute of Geomechanics, Chinese Academy of Geological Sciences since 2013. Her main research interests are paleontology and stratigraphy, in particular, study of the Cenozoic palynology of Tibet and Antarctica. She leads a research project on the Neogene palynology from the eastern and western margins of the Lambert Glacier of East Antarctica.

Wei participated in the 26th Chinese National Antarctic Research Expedition (October 2009-April 2010) and carried out geological investigation in the Grove Mountains area of East Antarctica. She was the first woman researcher from China to carry out geological research in the Antarctic inland.

Wei served as visiting scholar in the Institute of Geological and Nuclear Science, New Zealand from August to October 2011. From 2011-2013 she was a postdoctoral fellow in the Institute of Geology and Geophysics, Chinese Academy of Sciences.

== Selected works ==
- Guangwei, Li; Xiaohan, Liu; Alex, Pullen; Lijie, Wei; Xiaobing, Liu; Feixin, Huang; Xuejun, Zhou (2010-09-01). "In-situ detrital zircon geochronology and Hf isotopic analyses from Upper Triassic Tethys sequence strata". Earth and Planetary Science Letters. 297 (3–4): 461–470. Bibcode:2010E&PSL.297..461G. doi:10.1016/j.epsl.2010.06.050.
- Wei, L.j.; Raine, J.i.; Liu, X.h. (2014-02-01). "Terrestrial palynomorphs of the Cenozoic Pagodroma Group, northern Prince Charles Mountains, East Antarctica". Antarctic Science. 26 (1): 69–79. Bibcode:2014AntSc..26...69W. doi:10.1017/S0954102013000278. ISSN 1365-2079. S2CID 129445079.
- "东南极北查尔斯王子山新生代Pagodroma群生物地层特征 - 《中国学术期刊（网络版）》". www.cnki.net.
