= Zaoyuan Township =

Coordinates: 36°55′51″N 115°28′22″E

- Township

Chinese transcription(s)
- Interactive map of Zaoyuan Township
- Country: China
- Province: Hebei
- Prefecture: Xingtai
- County: Wei County
- Time zone: UTC+8 (China Standard Time)

Zaoyuan Township (Chinese: 枣园乡) is a township-level division situated in Xingtai, Hebei, China.

== See also ==
- List of township-level divisions of Hebei
