= Ningjin County, Hebei =

Ningjin County 宁晋县 Ningtsin
- County
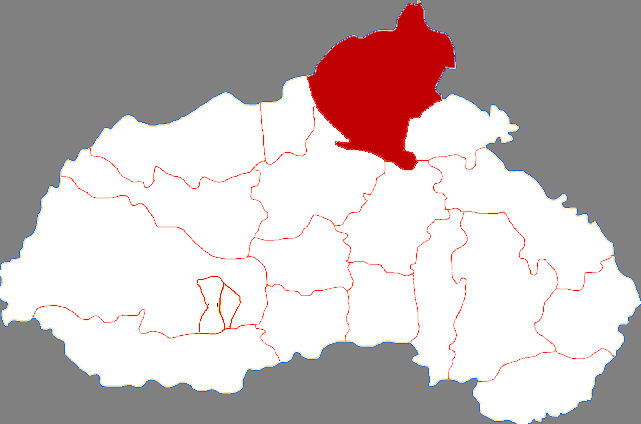
- Ningjin in Xingtai

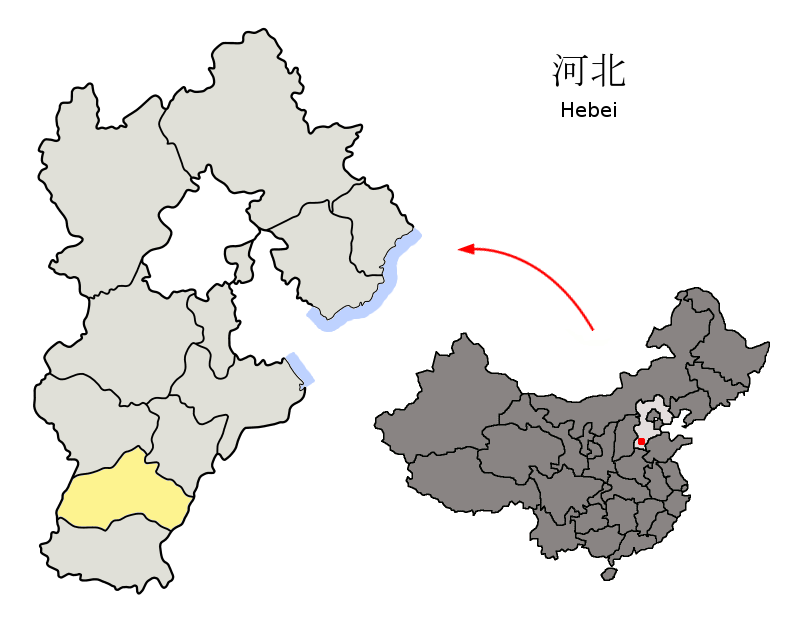
- Xingtai in Hebei
- Coordinates: 37°37′28″N 114°56′24″E
- Country: People's Republic of China
- Province: Hebei
- Prefecture-level city: Xingtai
- County seat: Fenghuang Town (凤凰镇)

Area
  - Total: 1,107 km^{2} (427 sq mi)
- Elevation: 36 m (118 ft)

Population
  - Total: 730,000
- Time zone: UTC+8 (China Standard)
- Postal code: 055550
- Area code: 0319

Ningjin County (simplified Chinese: 宁晋县; traditional Chinese: 寧晉縣; pinyin: Níngjìn Xiàn) is a county in the south of Hebei province, China. It is under the administration of Xingtai City, with a population of 730,000 residing in an area of 1,107 km^{2} (427 sq mi). Both and G20 Qingdao–Yinchuan Expressway and China National Highway 308 pass through the county.

== Administrative divisions ==
The county administers 10 towns and 6 townships.

Towns:

- Fenghuang (凤凰镇)
- Hequ (河渠镇)
- Beihezhuang (北河庄镇)
- Gengzhuangqiao (耿庄桥镇)
- Dongwang (东汪镇)
- Jiajiakou (贾家口镇)
- Sizhilan (四芝兰镇)
- Dalucun (大陆村镇)
- Sujiazhuang (苏家庄镇)
- Huanmadian (换马店镇)

Townships:

- Houkou Township (侯口乡)
- Jichangzhuang Township (纪昌庄乡)
- Tangqiu Township (唐邱乡)
- Beiyu Township (北鱼乡)
- Xujiahe Township (徐家河乡)
- Dacaozhuang Township (大曹庄乡)

== Climate ==
Climate data for Ningjin, elevation 31 m (102 ft), (1991–2020 normals, extremes 1981–2010)
Month	Jan	Feb	Mar	Apr	May	Jun	Jul	Aug	Sep	Oct	Nov	Dec	Year
Record high °C (°F)	18.3 (64.9)	25.7 (78.3)	32.1 (89.8)	33.3 (91.9)	39.0 (102.2)	42.2 (108.0)	43.2 (109.8)	37.3 (99.1)	36.9 (98.4)	32.5 (90.5)	27.2 (81.0)	22.1 (71.8)	43.2 (109.8)
Mean daily maximum °C (°F)	3.5 (38.3)	7.8 (46.0)	14.8 (58.6)	21.4 (70.5)	27.1 (80.8)	32.4 (90.3)	32.5 (90.5)	30.6 (87.1)	27.0 (80.6)	20.9 (69.6)	11.6 (52.9)	4.7 (40.5)	19.5 (67.1)
Daily mean °C (°F)	−2.9 (26.8)	1.0 (33.8)	7.8 (46.0)	14.6 (58.3)	20.5 (68.9)	25.8 (78.4)	27.3 (81.1)	25.4 (77.7)	20.6 (69.1)	14.2 (57.6)	5.5 (41.9)	−1.0 (30.2)	13.2 (55.8)
Mean daily minimum °C (°F)	−8.0 (17.6)	−4.6 (23.7)	1.6 (34.9)	8.2 (46.8)	13.9 (57.0)	19.6 (67.3)	22.7 (72.9)	21.2 (70.2)	15.4 (59.7)	8.6 (47.5)	0.6 (33.1)	−5.5 (22.1)	7.8 (46.1)
Record low °C (°F)	−22.0 (−7.6)	−18.3 (−0.9)	−10.1 (13.8)	−3.2 (26.2)	1.7 (35.1)	9.0 (48.2)	16.2 (61.2)	12.7 (54.9)	4.7 (40.5)	−3.1 (26.4)	−15.6 (3.9)	−21.2 (−6.2)	−22.0 (−7.6)
Average precipitation mm (inches)	2.2 (0.09)	5.3 (0.21)	8.7 (0.34)	24.8 (0.98)	37.2 (1.46)	50.9 (2.00)	122.5 (4.82)	110.3 (4.34)	49.3 (1.94)	23.5 (0.93)	15.1 (0.59)	2.9 (0.11)	452.7 (17.81)
Average precipitation days (≥ 0.1 mm)	1.8	2.8	2.8	5.4	6.7	8.5	11.1	10.2	7.0	5.3	4.2	2.5	68.3
Average snowy days	3.8	3.0	1.2	0.2	0	0	0	0	0	0	1.5	3.1	12.8
Average relative humidity (%)	61	56	53	61	64	60	74	80	75	67	69	66	66
Mean monthly sunshine hours	158.9	169.2	224.2	240.6	270.6	237.1	202.4	204.1	196.1	188.7	155.5	156.0	2,403.4
Percentage possible sunshine	52	55	60	61	61	54	45	49	53	55	52	53	54
Source: China Meteorological Administration
