= Wei County, Xingtai =

Wei County 威县
- County
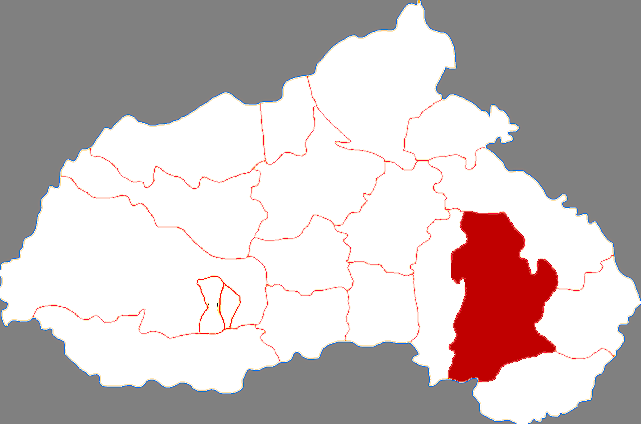
- Wei County in Xingtai

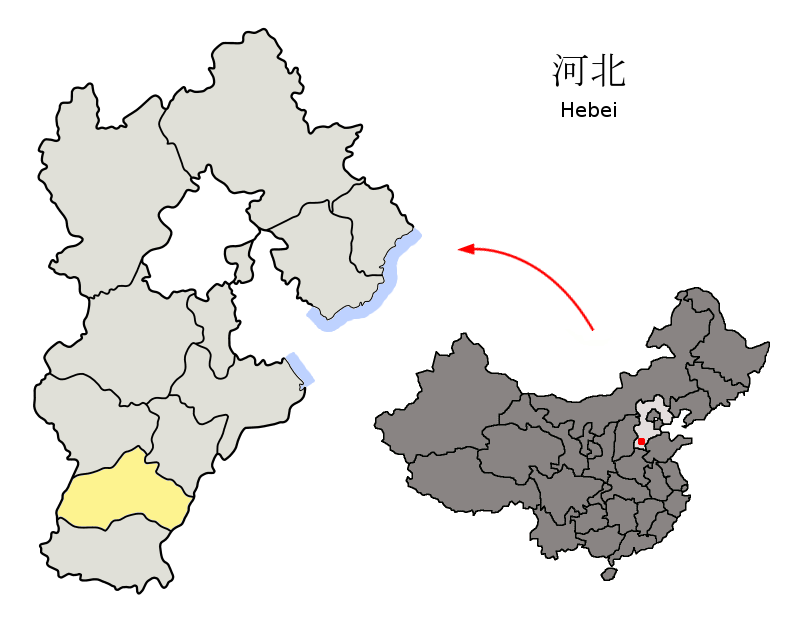
- Xingtai in Hebei
- Coordinates: 36°58′51″N 115°16′29″E
- Country: People's Republic of China
- Province: Hebei
- Prefecture-level city: Xingtai
- County seat: Mingzhou Town (洺州镇)

Area
  - Total: 994 km^{2} (384 sq mi)
- Elevation: 37 m (121 ft)

Population (2020 census)
  - Total: 496,230
  - Density: 499/km^{2} (1,290/sq mi)
- Time zone: UTC+8 (China Standard)
- Postal code: 054700

Wei County or Weixian (simplified Chinese: 威县; traditional Chinese: 威縣; pinyin: Wēi Xiàn) is a county in the south of Hebei province, China. It is under the administration of the prefecture-level city of Xingtai, with a population of 496,230 (2020 census) residing in an area of 994 km^{2} (384 sq mi). It is served by G45 Daqing–Guangzhou Expressway and China National Highway 106.

== Administrative divisions ==
Wei County consists of 5 towns and 11 townships.

Towns:

- Mingzhou (洺州镇)
- Liyuantun (梨元屯镇)
- Zhangtai (章台镇)
- Houguan (侯贯镇)
- Qiji (七级镇)

Townships:

- Fangjiaying Township (方家营乡)
- Dishiying Township (第什营乡)
- Zaoyuan Township (枣园乡)
- Guxian Township (固献乡)
- Hezhao Township (贺钊乡)
- Heying Township (贺营乡)
- Zhangying Township (张营乡)
- Changtun Township (常屯乡)
- Changzhuang Township (常庄乡)
- Gaogongzhuang Township (高公庄乡)
- Zhaocun Township (赵村乡)

== Climate ==
Climate data for Weixian, elevation 33 m (108 ft), (1991–2020 normals, extremes 1981–2010)
| Month | Jan | Feb | Mar | Apr | May | Jun | Jul | Aug | Sep | Oct | Nov | Dec | Year |
|---|---|---|---|---|---|---|---|---|---|---|---|---|---|
| Record high °C (°F) | 18.7 (65.7) | 25.3 (77.5) | 30.8 (87.4) | 35.2 (95.4) | 41.1 (106.0) | 41.2 (106.2) | 40.6 (105.1) | 37.9 (100.2) | 38.1 (100.6) | 31.9 (89.4) | 27.3 (81.1) | 23.4 (74.1) | 41.2 (106.2) |
| Mean daily maximum °C (°F) | 3.7 (38.7) | 8.1 (46.6) | 15.1 (59.2) | 22.1 (71.8) | 27.9 (82.2) | 32.3 (90.1) | 32.1 (89.8) | 30.5 (86.9) | 27.1 (80.8) | 21.3 (70.3) | 12.5 (54.5) | 5.4 (41.7) | 19.8 (67.7) |
| Daily mean °C (°F) | −2.3 (27.9) | 1.7 (35.1) | 8.5 (47.3) | 15.5 (59.9) | 21.5 (70.7) | 26.1 (79.0) | 27.2 (81.0) | 25.6 (78.1) | 20.9 (69.6) | 14.5 (58.1) | 6.1 (43.0) | −0.5 (31.1) | 13.7 (56.7) |
| Mean daily minimum °C (°F) | −7.2 (19.0) | −3.4 (25.9) | 2.7 (36.9) | 9.4 (48.9) | 15.3 (59.5) | 20.3 (68.5) | 22.9 (73.2) | 21.5 (70.7) | 15.9 (60.6) | 8.7 (47.7) | 0.9 (33.6) | −5.2 (22.6) | 8.5 (47.3) |
| Record low °C (°F) | −20.5 (−4.9) | −17.0 (1.4) | −9.7 (14.5) | −1.5 (29.3) | 3.8 (38.8) | 8.6 (47.5) | 16.5 (61.7) | 13.0 (55.4) | 4.6 (40.3) | −4.3 (24.3) | −14.7 (5.5) | −21.4 (−6.5) | −21.4 (−6.5) |
| Average precipitation mm (inches) | 2.9 (0.11) | 7.3 (0.29) | 9.0 (0.35) | 28.1 (1.11) | 41.6 (1.64) | 60.2 (2.37) | 128.4 (5.06) | 114.7 (4.52) | 44.2 (1.74) | 26.9 (1.06) | 15.2 (0.60) | 3.6 (0.14) | 482.1 (18.99) |
| Average precipitation days (≥ 0.1 mm) | 1.8 | 2.9 | 2.8 | 5.2 | 6.3 | 8.1 | 10.7 | 9.7 | 6.9 | 5.4 | 3.9 | 2.2 | 65.9 |
| Average snowy days | 2.3 | 2.7 | 0.9 | 0.2 | 0 | 0 | 0 | 0 | 0 | 0 | 0.9 | 2.1 | 9.1 |
| Average relative humidity (%) | 63 | 58 | 53 | 57 | 59 | 60 | 77 | 82 | 75 | 69 | 69 | 66 | 66 |
| Mean monthly sunshine hours | 150.5 | 158.9 | 209.4 | 227.8 | 250.8 | 216.4 | 181.3 | 180.6 | 181.6 | 177.8 | 148.2 | 145.3 | 2,228.6 |
| Percentage possible sunshine | 49 | 52 | 56 | 58 | 57 | 49 | 41 | 43 | 49 | 52 | 49 | 49 | 50 |
Source: China Meteorological Administration
