= Nangong =

Nangong 南宫市 Nankung
- County-level city
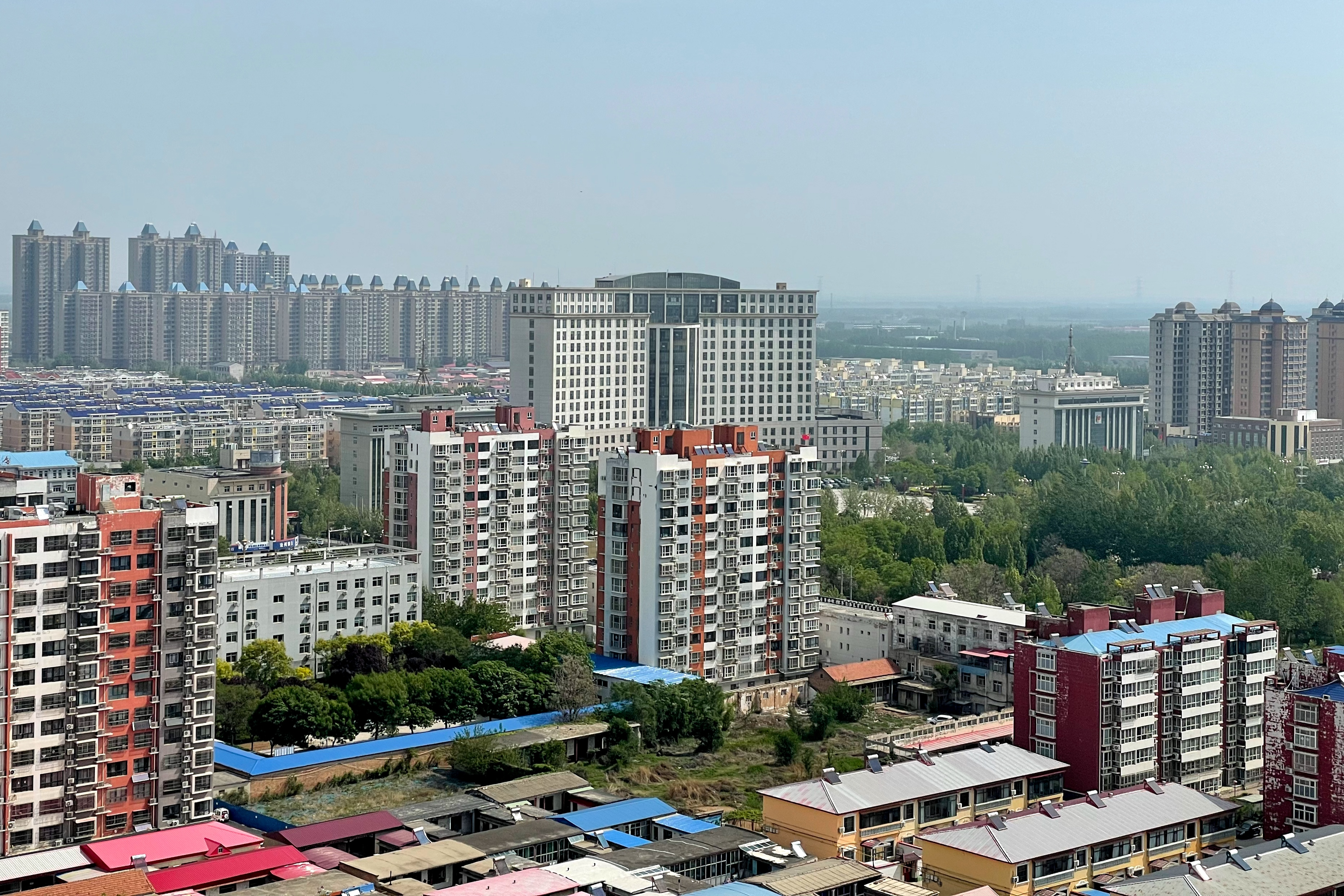

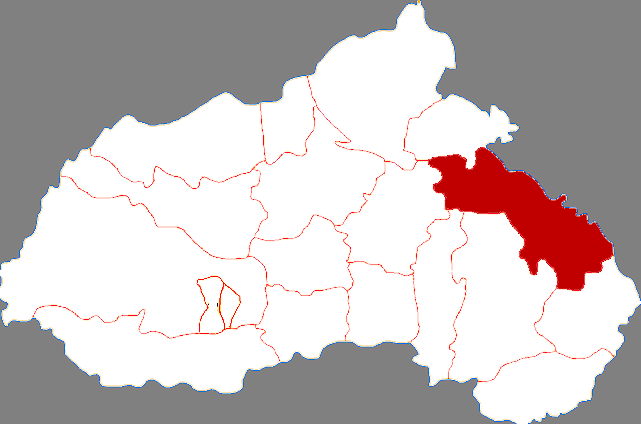
- Nangong in Xingtai

- Location in Hebei
- Coordinates: 37°21′32″N 115°24′32″E
- Country: People's Republic of China
- Province: Hebei
- Prefecture-level city: Xingtai

Area
  - County-level city: 863.3 km^{2} (333.3 sq mi)
  - Urban: 53.50 km^{2} (20.66 sq mi)

Population (2017)
  - County-level city: 523,000
  - Urban: 149,500
- Time zone: UTC+8 (China Standard)

Nangong (simplified Chinese: 南宫; traditional Chinese: 南宮; pinyin: Nángōng) is a county-level city in the south of Hebei province, China. It is administered by the prefecture-level city of Xingtai.

The city's population was 82,500 as of 2005.

Nangong county was initially created in Western Han dynasty, many locals engaged in martial arts, Nangong is famous of "hometown of martial arts".

== Administrative divisions ==
Subdistricts:

- Fenggang Subdistrict (凤岗街道), Nandu Subdistrict (南杜街道), Beihu Subdistrict (北胡街道), Xiding Subdistrict (西丁街道)

Towns:

- Sucun (苏村镇), Dagaocun (大高村镇), Chuiyang (垂杨镇), Minghua (明化镇), Duanlutou (段芦头镇), Qianzizhong (前紫冢镇)

Townships:

- Dacun Township (大村乡), Nanbiancun Township (南便村乡), Datun Nownship (大屯乡), Wangdaozhai Township (王道寨乡), Xuewucun Township (薛吴村乡)

== Climate ==
Climate data for Nangong, elevation 27 m (89 ft), (1991–2020 normals, extremes 1981–2010)
Month	Jan	Feb	Mar	Apr	May	Jun	Jul	Aug	Sep	Oct	Nov	Dec	Year
Record high °C (°F)	17.7 (63.9)	25.0 (77.0)	32.1 (89.8)	35.0 (95.0)	40.8 (105.4)	41.1 (106.0)	41.5 (106.7)	37.3 (99.1)	37.7 (99.9)	32.0 (89.6)	27.2 (81.0)	22.9 (73.2)	41.5 (106.7)
Mean daily maximum °C (°F)	3.6 (38.5)	8.0 (46.4)	15.1 (59.2)	22.2 (72.0)	28.1 (82.6)	32.5 (90.5)	32.3 (90.1)	30.7 (87.3)	27.2 (81.0)	21.3 (70.3)	12.2 (54.0)	5.1 (41.2)	19.9 (67.8)
Daily mean °C (°F)	−2.4 (27.7)	1.6 (34.9)	8.5 (47.3)	15.5 (59.9)	21.7 (71.1)	26.3 (79.3)	27.4 (81.3)	25.8 (78.4)	21.2 (70.2)	14.6 (58.3)	6.1 (43.0)	−0.6 (30.9)	13.8 (56.9)
Mean daily minimum °C (°F)	−7.0 (19.4)	−3.3 (26.1)	2.8 (37.0)	9.5 (49.1)	15.6 (60.1)	20.6 (69.1)	23.1 (73.6)	21.7 (71.1)	16.3 (61.3)	9.2 (48.6)	1.3 (34.3)	−4.8 (23.4)	8.8 (47.8)
Record low °C (°F)	−19.1 (−2.4)	−15.8 (3.6)	−8.5 (16.7)	−2.6 (27.3)	4.3 (39.7)	10.2 (50.4)	17.1 (62.8)	13.6 (56.5)	5.4 (41.7)	−3.5 (25.7)	−12.7 (9.1)	−19.4 (−2.9)	−19.4 (−2.9)
Average precipitation mm (inches)	3.1 (0.12)	7.5 (0.30)	9.3 (0.37)	28.4 (1.12)	42.4 (1.67)	55.9 (2.20)	131.7 (5.19)	103.6 (4.08)	42.1 (1.66)	26.5 (1.04)	16.5 (0.65)	3.7 (0.15)	470.7 (18.55)
Average precipitation days (≥ 0.1 mm)	2.1	3.2	2.8	5.2	6.1	7.2	10.8	9.6	6.4	4.7	3.7	2.6	64.4
Average snowy days	3.2	3.0	1.0	0.2	0	0	0	0	0	0	1.1	2.3	10.8
Average relative humidity (%)	60	56	50	54	56	57	75	79	72	65	66	64	63
Mean monthly sunshine hours	160.0	166.5	220.0	233.3	264.5	238.5	199.4	199.4	190.4	186.3	156.2	154.6	2,369.1
Percentage possible sunshine	52	54	59	59	60	54	45	48	52	54	52	52	53
Source: China Meteorological Administration
