= Hebei Pangzai =

Chinese internet personality

Liu Shichao (Chinese: 刘世超; pinyin: Liú Shìchāo), popularly known as Hebei Pangzai (Chinese: 河北胖仔; pinyin: Héběi Pàngzǎi; lit. 'Hebei fatty' or 'Hebei fat guy'), is a Chinese Internet personality. After gaining a following inside China, Liu became popular abroad in late 2019 when Kuaishou videos showing his ability to rapidly consume large amounts of food and drink went viral on Twitter.

== Videos ==
Liu registered on Kuaishou, a Chinese short video app and competitor to TikTok, in 2016, eventually focusing on videos of himself drinking and cooking. His video stunts typically involve outlandish drink portions and combinations, such as "beer, rice wine, spirits, a can of Red Bull, and an egg" mixed together and drunk within eight seconds. He reached over 470,000 followers on the app, earning up to 300 Renminbi per day through live broadcasts, before his account was shut down by Kuaishou for "unhealthy content."

In April 2018, the Cyberspace Administration of China, a regulatory body that oversees online censorship in the country, initiated a crackdown on content it considered vulgar or unhealthy. Kuaishou was a major target of the campaign and was temporarily pulled from mobile app stores. As a result, Liu's account was suspended for four months, most of his popular videos were deleted, and he lost over 100,000 followers.

In August 2019, an American uploaded some of Liu's videos on Twitter without Liu's knowledge. He subsequently decided to sign up for Twitter, obtaining over 70,000 followers in less than a month. He posted old content from Kuaishou of his drinking, and also started to focus more on videos portraying his everyday life.

== Personal life ==
Liu is from the village of Zhengyuansi (正元寺) in Baixiang County, Hebei, where he has worked odd jobs as a laborer and on his parents' farm. He has a middle school education and does not speak English; he communicates with international fans through translation apps or asks friends for help if needed. He once owned a restaurant called Pangzai's Hot Pot, but closed it down in 2016.

Liu has a wife and two children. His wife did not approve of his drinking at first, but later grew accustomed to it, saying his videos could help foreigners understand everyday life in China. Liu maintains that he only drinks "within the scope of [his] ability" for his videos.
