= Beiguozhuang =

Coordinates: 39°33′N 112°58′E

Beiguozhuang 北郭庄村
- Village
- Location in Jiangsu
- Country: People's Republic of China
- Province: Jiangsu
- Prefecture-level city: Wuxi
- County-level city: Jiangyin
- Subdistrict: Lingang Subdistrict

Area
  - Total: 7.5 km^{2} (2.9 sq mi)
- Time zone: UTC+8 (CST)
- Merged from former Qianzhou (2008), Shedu (2002), and Beiguozhuang villages

Beiguozhuang (Simplified Chinese: 北郭庄 or 邢台; pinyin: Beiguozhuang) is a village in the northeast of Xingtai.

In 2013, as part of the establishment of the Quandong Sub-district Office (泉东街道办事处), Beiguozhuang (along with four other residents' committees from Daliangzhuang Township) was transferred to the new sub-district. The new sub-district encompasses an area of 2.722 square kilometers and has a population of 69,100.

Beiguozhuang Village was formed through the merger and regional adjustment of the original administrative villages of Qianzhou (incorporated in 2008), Shedu (incorporated in 2002), and Beiguozhuang itself, covering a total area of approximately 7.5 square kilometers at the southwestern end of Lingang Sub-district. The village comprises 25 natural hamlets and 46 villager groups, hosts 27 enterprises of varying sizes—including major above-scale companies such as Jiangsu Lvgang Group and Jiangyin Keyuan Machinery Co., Ltd.—and relies primarily on traditional agriculture, with scattered households cultivating wheat and rice as staple crops and some growing cash crops like grapes and red-hearted kiwifruit. Shaped in a long, narrow north-south layout with convenient transportation links, it is surrounded by four main arterial roads: Zhencheng Road, Furong Avenue, Gangcheng Avenue, and Guibin Road.
