= Xiangdu, Xingtai =

Coordinates: 37°04′48″N 114°30′32″E

Xiangdu District 襄都区
- District
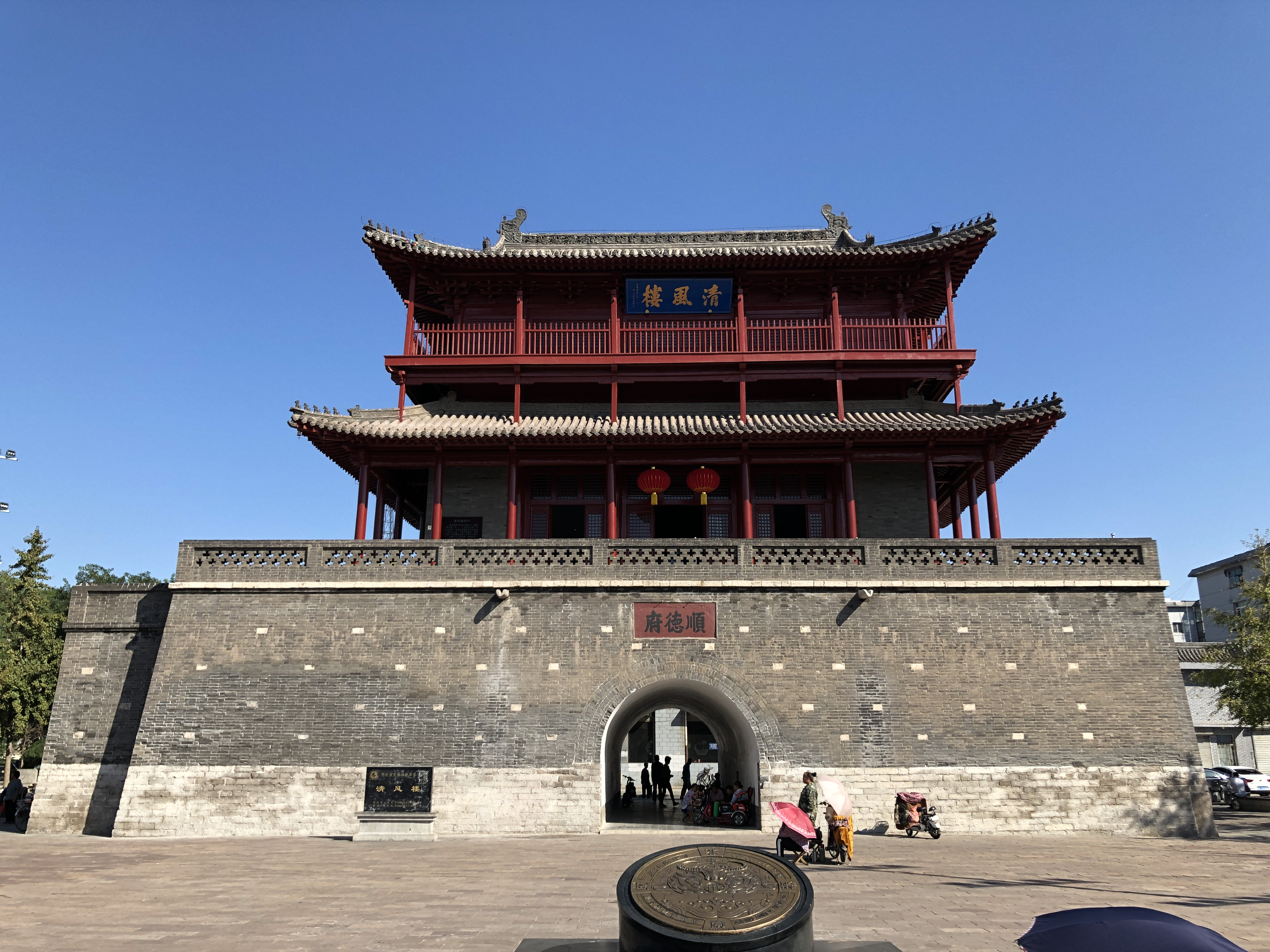

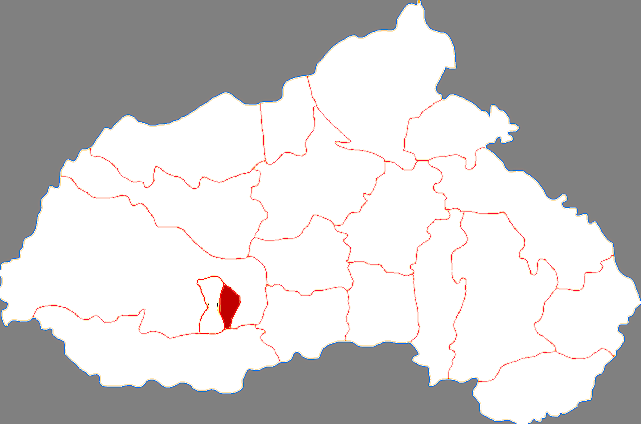
- Qiaodong in Xingtai

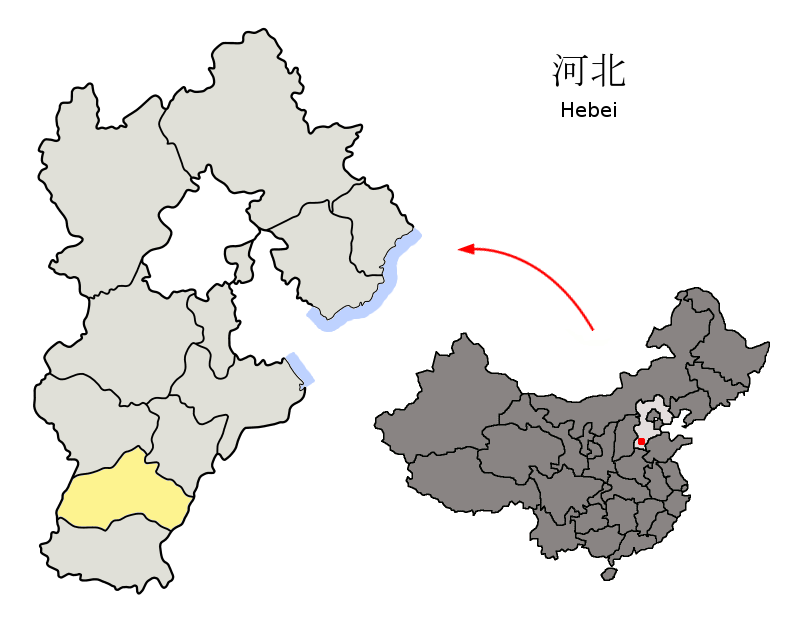
- Xingtai in Hebei
- Country: People's Republic of China
- Province: Hebei
- Prefecture-level city: Xingtai
- Time zone: UTC+8 (China Standard)

Xiangdu District (simplified Chinese: 襄都区; traditional Chinese: 襄都區; pinyin: Xiāngdū Qū) is a district of Xingtai, Hebei, China. As of August 2025, it had a population of 459,000. It covers an area of 122.51 square kilometers, or 47.3 square miles.

== Administrative divisions ==
Subdistricts:

- Ximenli Subdistrict (西门里街道), Nanchang Avenue Subdistrict (南长街街道), Xida Avenue Subdistrict (西大街街道), Beida Avenue Subdistrict (北大街街道)

Townships:

- Dongguocun Township (东郭村乡), Daliangzhuang Township (大梁庄乡)
