= Shahe, Hebei =

Shahe 沙河市 Shaho
- County-level city
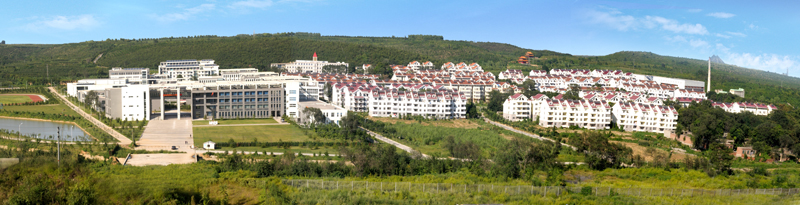

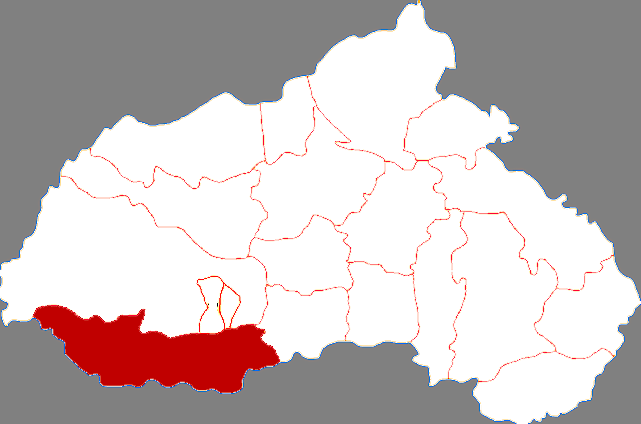
- Shahe in Xingtai

- Location in Hebei
- Coordinates: 36°51′18″N 114°30′12″E
- Country: People's Republic of China
- Province: Hebei
- Prefecture-level city: Xingtai

Area
  - County-level city: 999.0 km^{2} (385.7 sq mi)
  - Urban: 37.00 km^{2} (14.29 sq mi)

Population (2017)
  - County-level city: 457,000
  - Urban: 96,500
- Time zone: UTC+8 (China Standard)

Shahe (Chinese: 沙河; pinyin: Shāhé) is a county-level city in the prefecture-level city of Xingtai, in the southern part of Hebei province, China.

Shahe has been called China's "glass capital." Its glass factories manufacture about ten percent of the world supply of flat glass. About 50,000 of Shahe's 480,000 residents work in the glass industry.

Smog in Shahe has become a serious problem, with some factories preferring to pay fines rather than comply with air pollution enforcement requirements.

== Administrative divisions ==
Subdistricts:

- Dalian Subdistrict (褡裢街道), Qiaodong Subdistrict (桥东街道), Qiaoxi Subdistrict (桥西街道), Zanshan Subdistrict (赞善街道), Zhouzhuang Subdistrict (周庄街道)

Towns:

- Shahecheng (沙河城镇), Xincheng (新城镇), Baita (白塔镇), Shiliting (十里亭镇), Qicun (綦村镇

Townships:

- Liucun Township (留村乡), Cejing Township (册井乡), Liushigang Township (刘石岗乡), Chaiguan Township (柴关乡), Chanfang Township (蝉房乡)

== Climate ==
Climate data for Shahe, elevation 68 m (223 ft), (1991–2020 normals, extremes 1981–present)
Month	Jan	Feb	Mar	Apr	May	Jun	Jul	Aug	Sep	Oct	Nov	Dec	Year
Record high °C (°F)	19.3 (66.7)	29.1 (84.4)	32.8 (91.0)	36.5 (97.7)	38.2 (100.8)	44.4 (111.9)	41.7 (107.1)	36.3 (97.3)	38.9 (102.0)	33.9 (93.0)	27.8 (82.0)	27.8 (82.0)	44.4 (111.9)
Mean daily maximum °C (°F)	4.0 (39.2)	8.4 (47.1)	15.2 (59.4)	21.7 (71.1)	27.4 (81.3)	32.6 (90.7)	32.4 (90.3)	30.5 (86.9)	27.2 (81.0)	21.4 (70.5)	12.4 (54.3)	5.7 (42.3)	19.9 (67.8)
Daily mean °C (°F)	−2.4 (27.7)	1.5 (34.7)	8.2 (46.8)	15.0 (59.0)	20.9 (69.6)	26.1 (79.0)	27.2 (81.0)	25.4 (77.7)	20.8 (69.4)	14.6 (58.3)	5.9 (42.6)	−0.5 (31.1)	13.6 (56.4)
Mean daily minimum °C (°F)	−7.2 (19.0)	−3.9 (25.0)	2.1 (35.8)	8.7 (47.7)	14.5 (58.1)	19.9 (67.8)	22.7 (72.9)	21.2 (70.2)	15.7 (60.3)	9.2 (48.6)	1.0 (33.8)	−5 (23)	8.2 (46.8)
Record low °C (°F)	−21.0 (−5.8)	−22.3 (−8.1)	−10.2 (13.6)	−3.6 (25.5)	2.1 (35.8)	10.0 (50.0)	16.1 (61.0)	12.0 (53.6)	5.1 (41.2)	−2.9 (26.8)	−16.0 (3.2)	−17.5 (0.5)	−22.3 (−8.1)
Average precipitation mm (inches)	2.6 (0.10)	7.0 (0.28)	7.8 (0.31)	28.2 (1.11)	39.5 (1.56)	50.4 (1.98)	162.2 (6.39)	118.8 (4.68)	46.2 (1.82)	25.1 (0.99)	14.4 (0.57)	3.0 (0.12)	505.2 (19.91)
Average precipitation days (≥ 0.1 mm)	1.7	2.8	2.7	5.5	6.8	8.6	11.3	10.1	7.0	5.5	3.5	2.0	67.5
Average snowy days	2.7	2.8	0.8	0.2	0	0	0	0	0	0	1.4	2.5	10.4
Average relative humidity (%)	63	59	55	62	64	60	76	82	76	69	70	67	67
Mean monthly sunshine hours	139.2	155.3	202.2	225.2	248.8	218.1	183.4	182.6	177.6	177.6	148.7	144.7	2,203.4
Percentage possible sunshine	45	50	54	57	57	50	41	44	48	52	49	48	50
Source: China Meteorological Administration all-time February high
