= Baixiang County =

Baixiang County 柏乡县 Paisiang
- County
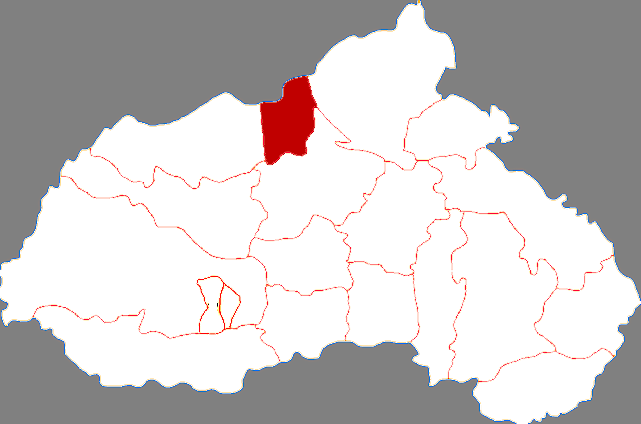
- Baixiang in Xingtai

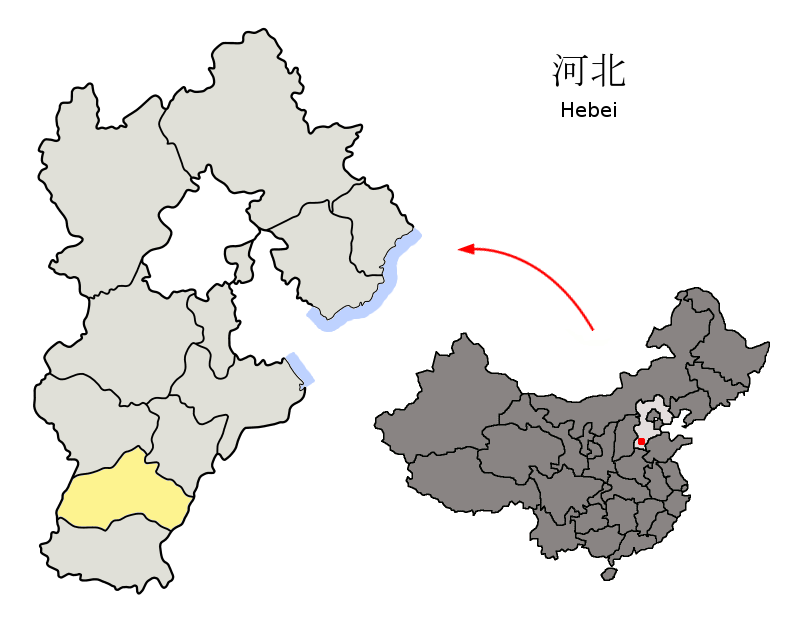
- Xingtai in Hebei
- Coordinates: 37°28′55″N 114°41′35″E
- Country: People's Republic of China
- Province: Hebei
- Prefecture-level city: Xingtai
- Township-level divisions: 3 towns 3 townships
- County seat: Baixiang Town (柏乡镇)

Area
  - Total: 268 km^{2} (103 sq mi)
- Elevation: 39 m (128 ft)

Population (2014)
  - Total: 193,777
  - Density: 723/km^{2} (1,870/sq mi)
- Time zone: UTC+8 (China Standard)
- Postal code: 055450
- Area code: 0319

Baixiang County (simplified Chinese: 柏乡县; traditional Chinese: 柏鄉縣; pinyin: Bǎixiāng Xiàn) is a county in the southwest of Hebei province, China. It is under the administration of the prefecture-level city of Xingtai, with a population of 193,777 (2014) residing in an area of 268 km^{2} (103 sq mi). It lies generally to the east of G4 Beijing–Hong Kong and Macau Expressway and China National Highway 107. The Baixiang County is known as being the former capital of the state of Xiang (襄國) of the Southern Huns state Later Zhao, described in the Fang Xuanling Book of Jin Chapter 104, was located in the territory of the county. It was a place of the 351 CE Battle of Xiangguo between Ran Min's army and Shi Zhi of Later Zhao. After the battle, the Later Zhao general Liu Xian (劉顯) killed Shi Zhi in Xiangguo, the Xiangguo city was burned, and its population moved to Yecheng.

== Administrative divisions ==
The county administers 3 towns and 3 townships.

=== Towns ===
- Baixiang (柏乡镇)
- Guchengdian (固城店镇)
- Xiwang (西汪镇)

=== Townships ===
- Wangjiazhuang Township (王家庄乡)
- Neibu Township (内步乡)
- Longhua Township (龙华乡)

== Climate ==
Climate data for Baixiang, elevation 35 m (115 ft), (1991–2020 normals, extremes 1981–2010)
Month	Jan	Feb	Mar	Apr	May	Jun	Jul	Aug	Sep	Oct	Nov	Dec	Year
Record high °C (°F)	18.6 (65.5)	25.9 (78.6)	29.4 (84.9)	34.0 (93.2)	39.0 (102.2)	41.1 (106.0)	42.2 (108.0)	37.7 (99.9)	38.0 (100.4)	33.6 (92.5)	27.7 (81.9)	22.7 (72.9)	42.2 (108.0)
Mean daily maximum °C (°F)	3.3 (37.9)	7.4 (45.3)	15.5 (59.9)	21.3 (70.3)	27.1 (80.8)	32.8 (91.0)	32.5 (90.5)	30.4 (86.7)	26.8 (80.2)	21.3 (70.3)	12.1 (53.8)	4.9 (40.8)	19.6 (67.3)
Daily mean °C (°F)	−3.2 (26.2)	0.4 (32.7)	8.0 (46.4)	14.6 (58.3)	20.6 (69.1)	25.9 (78.6)	27.1 (80.8)	25.2 (77.4)	20.3 (68.5)	14.2 (57.6)	5.5 (41.9)	−1.4 (29.5)	13.1 (55.6)
Mean daily minimum °C (°F)	−8.5 (16.7)	−5.0 (23.0)	1.0 (33.8)	7.7 (45.9)	13.7 (56.7)	19.2 (66.6)	22.4 (72.3)	20.9 (69.6)	15.0 (59.0)	8.4 (47.1)	0.3 (32.5)	−6.3 (20.7)	7.4 (45.3)
Record low °C (°F)	−20.9 (−5.6)	−21.6 (−6.9)	−11.3 (11.7)	−4.0 (24.8)	1.7 (35.1)	8.7 (47.7)	15.8 (60.4)	13.1 (55.6)	4.2 (39.6)	−4.0 (24.8)	−16.5 (2.3)	−21.9 (−7.4)	−21.9 (−7.4)
Average precipitation mm (inches)	2.3 (0.09)	5.2 (0.20)	8.8 (0.35)	25.9 (1.02)	38.9 (1.53)	49.2 (1.94)	130.3 (5.13)	134.2 (5.28)	53.9 (2.12)	24.7 (0.97)	15.2 (0.60)	2.9 (0.11)	491.5 (19.34)
Average precipitation days (≥ 0.1 mm)	1.6	2.5	2.7	5.3	6.5	8.5	11.0	9.9	7.0	5.4	3.8	1.9	66.1
Average snowy days	2.6	2.4	1.1	0.2	0	0	0	0	0	0	1.2	2.3	9.8
Average relative humidity (%)	64	59	58	65	68	64	78	84	79	72	74	70	70
Mean monthly sunshine hours	134.4	150.9	197.6	219.7	240.6	210.3	171.3	172.9	169.1	168.0	141.4	134.0	2,110.2
Percentage possible sunshine	44	49	53	55	55	48	39	42	46	49	47	45	48
Source: China Meteorological Administration
