= Longyao County =

Longyao County 隆尧县
- County
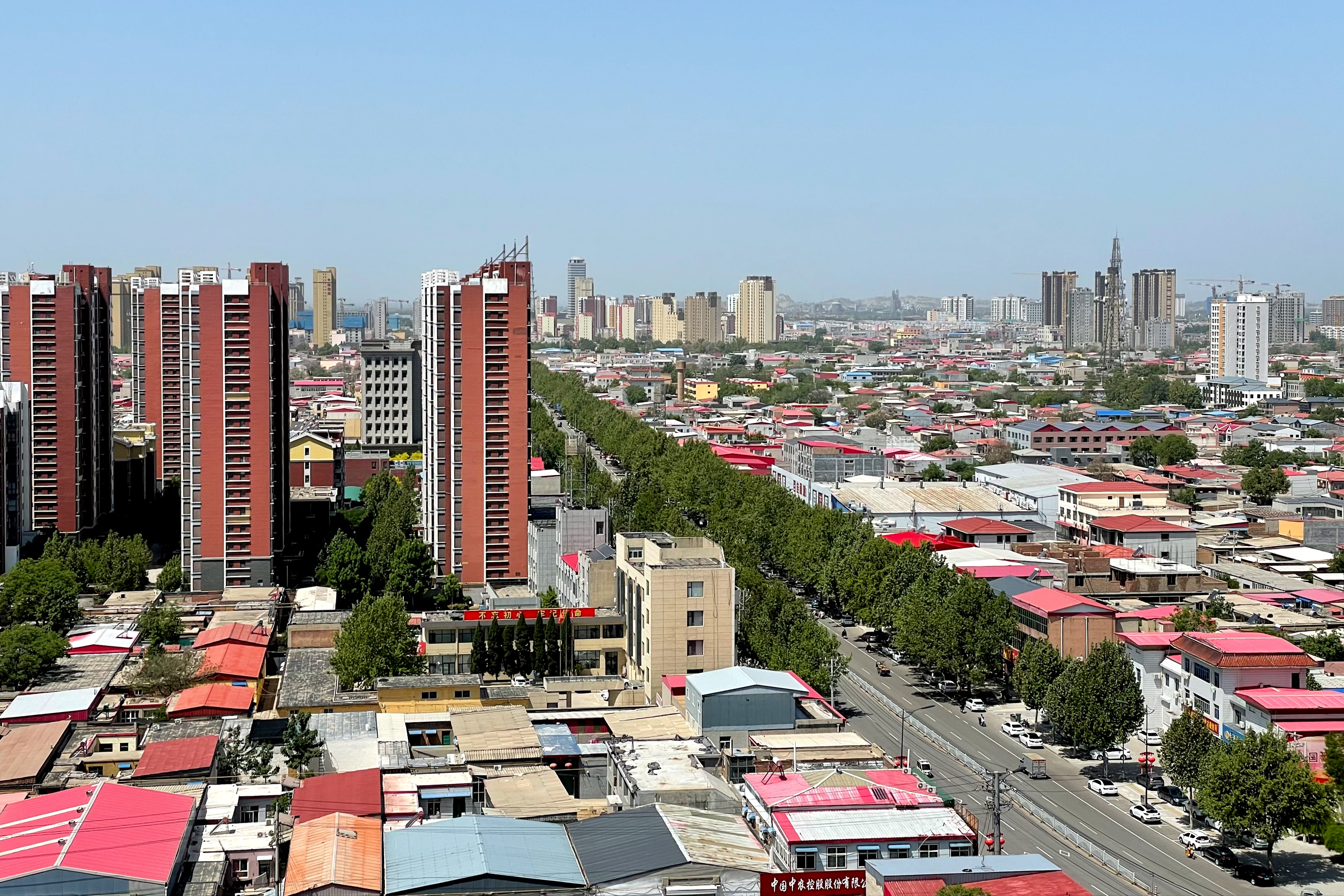

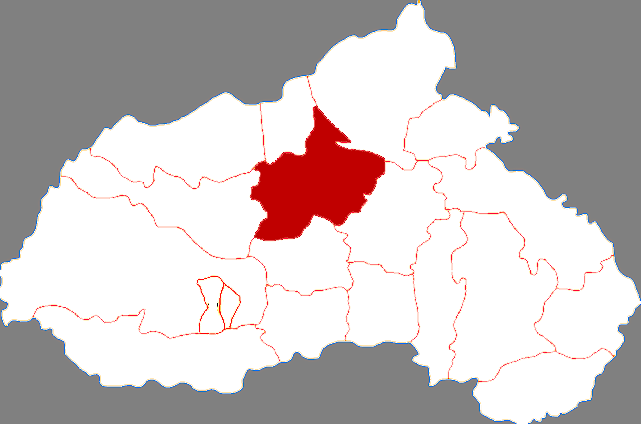
- Longyao in Xingtai

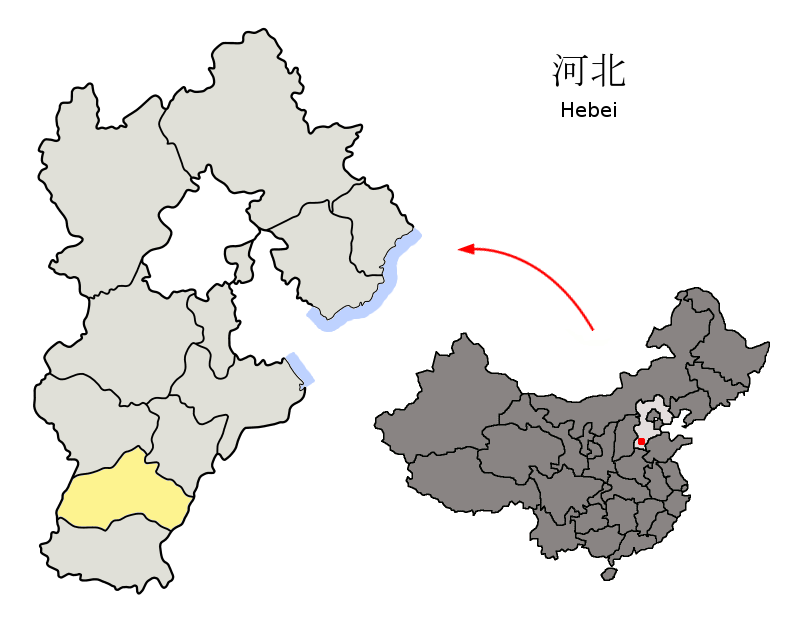
- Xingtai in Hebei
- Coordinates: 37°21′00″N 114°46′12″E
- Country: People's Republic of China
- Province: Hebei
- Prefecture-level city: Xingtai
- County seat: Longyao Town (隆尧镇)

Area
  - Total: 749 km^{2} (289 sq mi)
- Elevation: 37 m (121 ft)

Population (2014)
  - Total: 517,098
  - Density: 690/km^{2} (1,790/sq mi)
- Time zone: UTC+8 (China Standard)
- Postal code: 055350

Longyao County (simplified Chinese: 隆尧县; traditional Chinese: 隆堯縣; pinyin: Lóngyáo Xiàn) is a county in southwestern Hebei province, China. It is under the administration of Xingtai City, with a population of 490,000 residing in an area of 749 km^{2} (289 sq mi). It was combined from Longping County (simplified Chinese: 隆平县; traditional Chinese: 隆平縣) and Yaoshan County (simplified Chinese: 尧山县; traditional Chinese: 堯山縣) in 1947.

== Administrative divisions ==
The county administers 6 towns and 6 townships.

Towns:

- Longyao (隆尧镇), Weijiazhuang (魏家庄镇), Yincun (尹村镇), Shankou (山口镇), Lianzi (莲子镇), Gucheng (固城镇)

Townships:

- Beilou Township (北楼乡), Dongliang Township (东良乡), Shuangbei Township (双碑乡), Niujiaqiao Township (牛家桥乡), Qianhuying Township (千户营乡), Dazhangzhuang Township (大张庄乡)

== Climate ==
Climate data for Longyao, elevation 31 m (102 ft), (1991–2020 normals, extremes 1981–2010)
Month	Jan	Feb	Mar	Apr	May	Jun	Jul	Aug	Sep	Oct	Nov	Dec	Year
Record high °C (°F)	18.2 (64.8)	26.1 (79.0)	32.6 (90.7)	33.2 (91.8)	38.7 (101.7)	42.2 (108.0)	42.0 (107.6)	36.8 (98.2)	37.8 (100.0)	32.7 (90.9)	27.3 (81.1)	22.4 (72.3)	42.2 (108.0)
Mean daily maximum °C (°F)	3.6 (38.5)	8.0 (46.4)	15.0 (59.0)	21.6 (70.9)	27.3 (81.1)	32.6 (90.7)	32.6 (90.7)	30.6 (87.1)	27.0 (80.6)	21.1 (70.0)	11.8 (53.2)	5.0 (41.0)	19.7 (67.4)
Daily mean °C (°F)	−2.3 (27.9)	1.6 (34.9)	8.3 (46.9)	15.1 (59.2)	21.0 (69.8)	26.2 (79.2)	27.5 (81.5)	25.7 (78.3)	20.9 (69.6)	14.6 (58.3)	5.9 (42.6)	−0.5 (31.1)	13.7 (56.6)
Mean daily minimum °C (°F)	−7.0 (19.4)	−3.5 (25.7)	2.4 (36.3)	9.0 (48.2)	14.8 (58.6)	20.2 (68.4)	23.1 (73.6)	21.5 (70.7)	15.9 (60.6)	9.1 (48.4)	1.2 (34.2)	−4.6 (23.7)	8.5 (47.3)
Record low °C (°F)	−20.3 (−4.5)	−20.1 (−4.2)	−8.9 (16.0)	−2.3 (27.9)	3.0 (37.4)	9.0 (48.2)	16.5 (61.7)	13.1 (55.6)	4.2 (39.6)	−2.5 (27.5)	−15.0 (5.0)	−19.4 (−2.9)	−20.3 (−4.5)
Average precipitation mm (inches)	2.5 (0.10)	5.6 (0.22)	8.2 (0.32)	26.1 (1.03)	38.2 (1.50)	54.1 (2.13)	140.6 (5.54)	114.5 (4.51)	47.1 (1.85)	24.7 (0.97)	14.9 (0.59)	3.0 (0.12)	479.5 (18.88)
Average precipitation days (≥ 0.1 mm)	1.7	2.7	2.6	5.2	6.9	8.5	11.3	9.8	7.1	5.2	4.0	2.2	67.2
Average snowy days	3.1	2.8	1.0	0.2	0	0	0	0	0	0	1.3	3.0	11.4
Average relative humidity (%)	59	55	52	59	62	59	74	80	74	67	68	65	65
Mean monthly sunshine hours	139.3	153.2	201.0	222.9	251.5	221.3	184.6	191.0	185.0	178.0	144.3	137.3	2,209.4
Percentage possible sunshine	45	50	54	56	57	50	42	46	50	52	48	46	50
Source: China Meteorological Administration
