= Julu County =

Julu County 巨鹿县 Kulu
- County
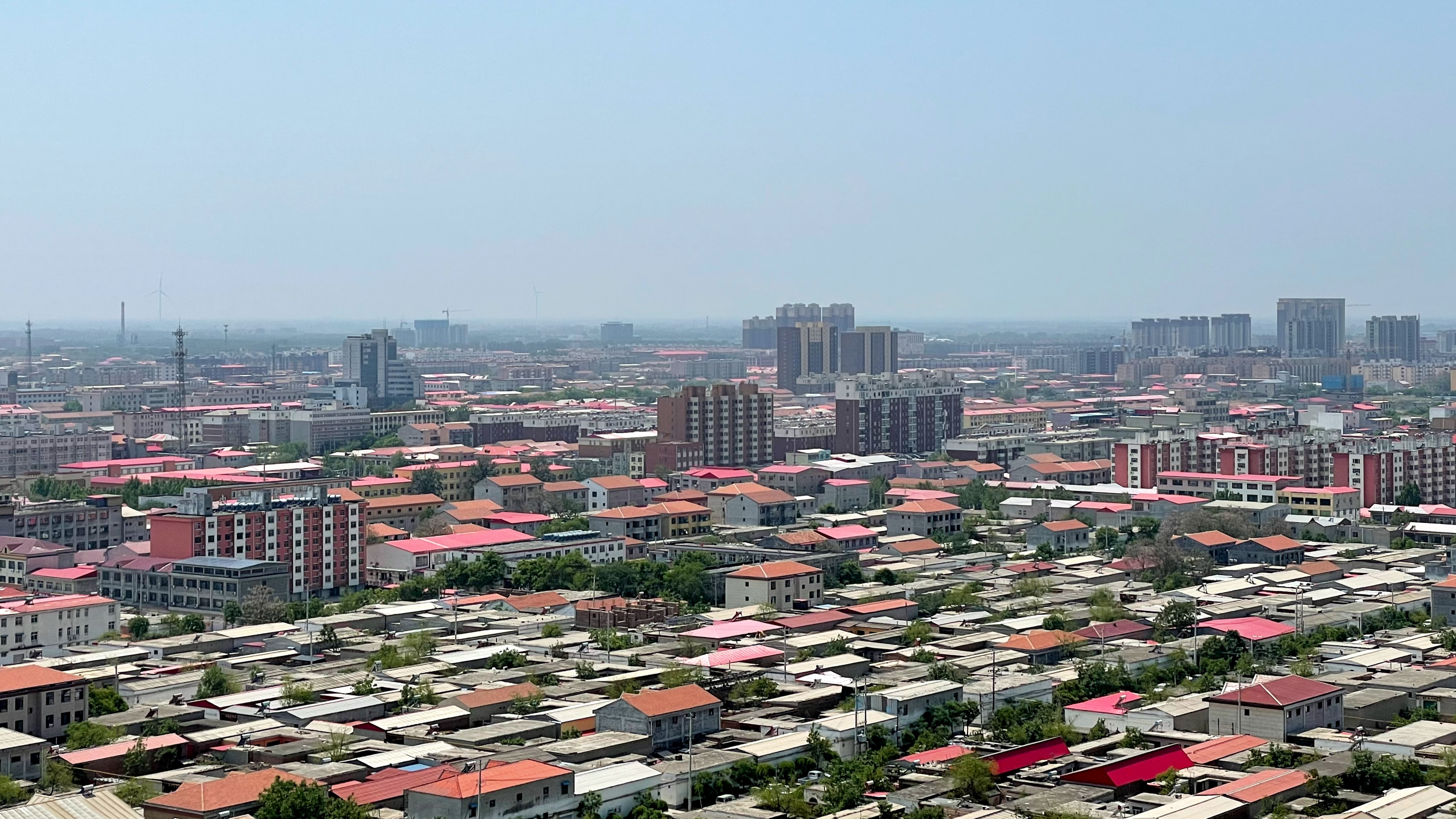

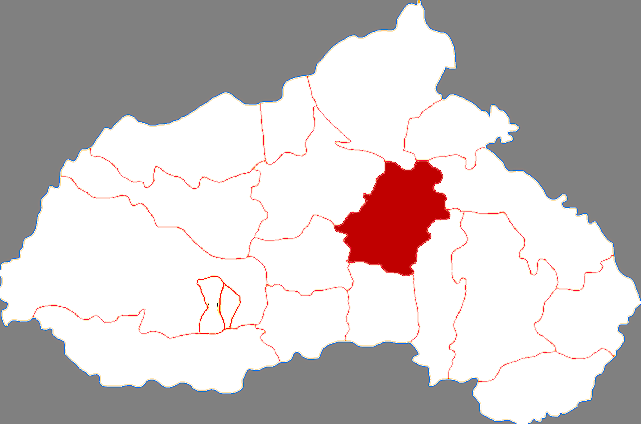
- Julu in Xingtai

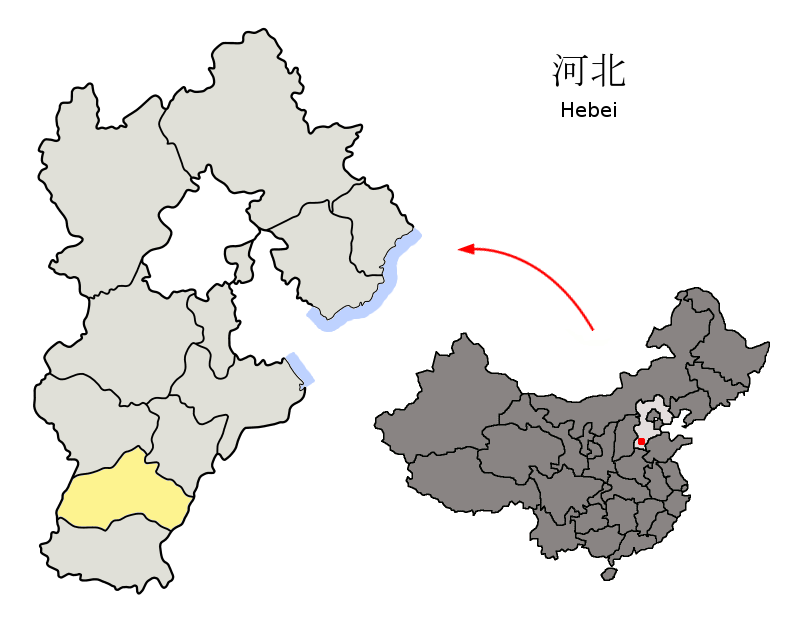
- Xingtai in Hebei
- Coordinates: 37°13′16″N 115°02′13″E
- Country: People's Republic of China
- Province: Hebei
- Prefecture-level city: Xingtai
- County seat: Julu (巨鹿镇)

Area
  - Total: 623 km^{2} (241 sq mi)
- Elevation: 31 m (102 ft)

Population
  - Total: 370,000
  - Density: 590/km^{2} (1,500/sq mi)
- Time zone: UTC+8 (China Standard)
- Postal code: 055250

Julu (simplified Chinese: 巨鹿; traditional Chinese: 鉅鹿; pinyin: Jùlù) is a county of Xingtai City, in the south of Hebei province, China. Prior to the Sui dynasty, Julu had been known as Nanyi County (南亦县; Nányì Xiàn). The name was changed and became Julu, with the Chinese for Ju being written either as either "巨" or "钜". In 1980, the name was standardized as "巨鹿". The county has a population of 370,000 residing in an area of 623 km^{2} (241 sq mi).

== Administrative divisions ==
The county administers 6 towns and 4 townships.

Towns:

- Julu (巨鹿镇), Wanghuzhai (王虎寨镇), Xiguocheng (西郭城镇), Guanting (官亭镇), Yantuan (阎疃镇), Xiaolüzhai (小吕寨镇)

Townships:

- Ticun Township (堤村乡), Zhangwangtuan Township (张王疃乡), Guanzhai Township (观寨乡), Sujiaying Township (苏家营乡)

== Climate ==
Climate data for Julu, elevation 26 m (85 ft), (1991–2020 normals, extremes 1981–2010)
Month	Jan	Feb	Mar	Apr	May	Jun	Jul	Aug	Sep	Oct	Nov	Dec	Year
Record high °C (°F)	18.3 (64.9)	24.8 (76.6)	28.6 (83.5)	35.6 (96.1)	41.6 (106.9)	40.9 (105.6)	41.1 (106.0)	37.6 (99.7)	38.0 (100.4)	32.7 (90.9)	27.3 (81.1)	22.5 (72.5)	41.6 (106.9)
Mean daily maximum °C (°F)	3.6 (38.5)	8.0 (46.4)	15.0 (59.0)	22.1 (71.8)	27.8 (82.0)	32.3 (90.1)	32.4 (90.3)	30.6 (87.1)	27.0 (80.6)	21.1 (70.0)	12.1 (53.8)	5.1 (41.2)	19.8 (67.6)
Daily mean °C (°F)	−2.2 (28.0)	1.8 (35.2)	8.5 (47.3)	15.5 (59.9)	21.4 (70.5)	26.1 (79.0)	27.4 (81.3)	25.8 (78.4)	21.1 (70.0)	14.5 (58.1)	6.0 (42.8)	−0.4 (31.3)	13.8 (56.8)
Mean daily minimum °C (°F)	−6.6 (20.1)	−3.0 (26.6)	3.0 (37.4)	9.6 (49.3)	15.5 (59.9)	20.5 (68.9)	23.2 (73.8)	21.8 (71.2)	16.4 (61.5)	9.3 (48.7)	1.4 (34.5)	−4.5 (23.9)	8.9 (48.0)
Record low °C (°F)	−23.0 (−9.4)	−17.4 (0.7)	−10.0 (14.0)	−1.5 (29.3)	4.1 (39.4)	11.2 (52.2)	17.0 (62.6)	14.1 (57.4)	4.0 (39.2)	−3.7 (25.3)	−13.2 (8.2)	−20.6 (−5.1)	−23.0 (−9.4)
Average precipitation mm (inches)	2.5 (0.10)	7.4 (0.29)	9.2 (0.36)	25.8 (1.02)	39.6 (1.56)	61.2 (2.41)	141.3 (5.56)	116.8 (4.60)	50.1 (1.97)	25.7 (1.01)	15.7 (0.62)	3.4 (0.13)	498.7 (19.63)
Average precipitation days (≥ 0.1 mm)	1.9	3.1	2.6	5.3	6.8	7.9	10.9	9.5	6.7	5.5	3.9	2.3	66.4
Average snowy days	3.5	3.1	1.0	0.2	0	0	0	0	0	0	1.2	3.1	12.1
Average relative humidity (%)	61	56	52	56	59	60	75	80	74	68	68	65	65
Mean monthly sunshine hours	148.6	156.2	207.9	232.6	259.1	227.2	197.5	193.7	186.5	180.7	151.6	145.4	2,287
Percentage possible sunshine	48	51	56	59	59	52	44	47	51	53	50	49	52
Source: China Meteorological Administration
