= Xingtai =

Xingtai 邢台市 Hsingtai, Shunteh
- Prefecture-level city
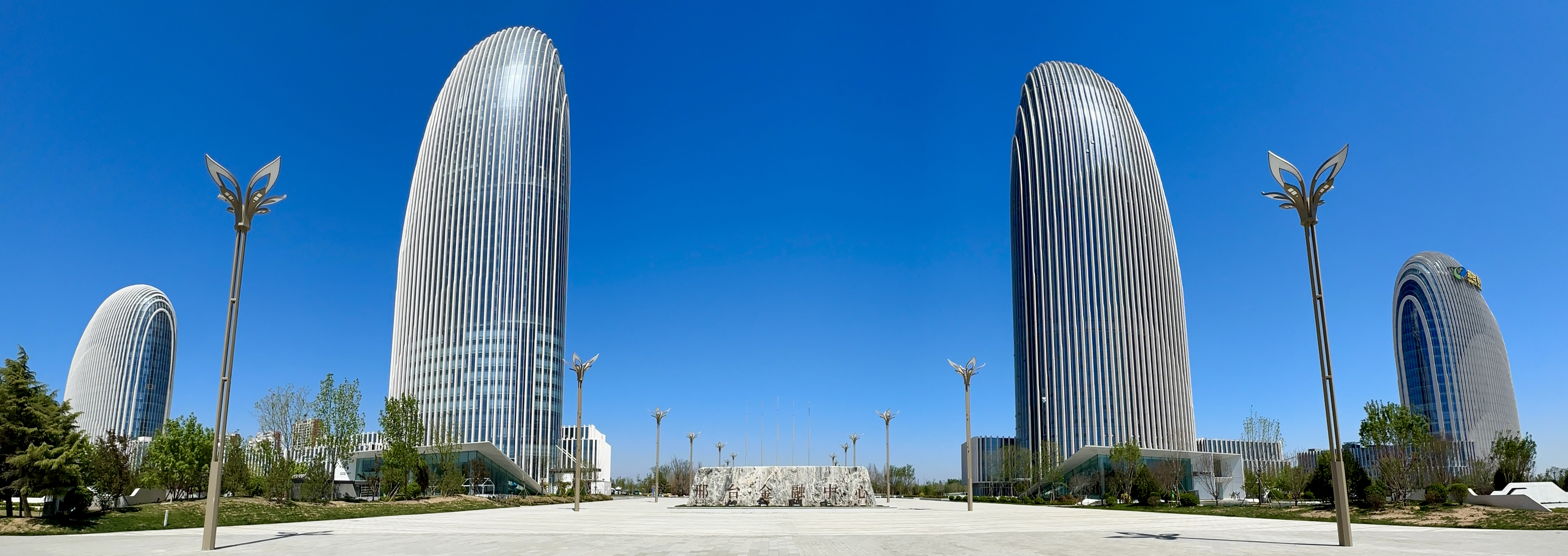
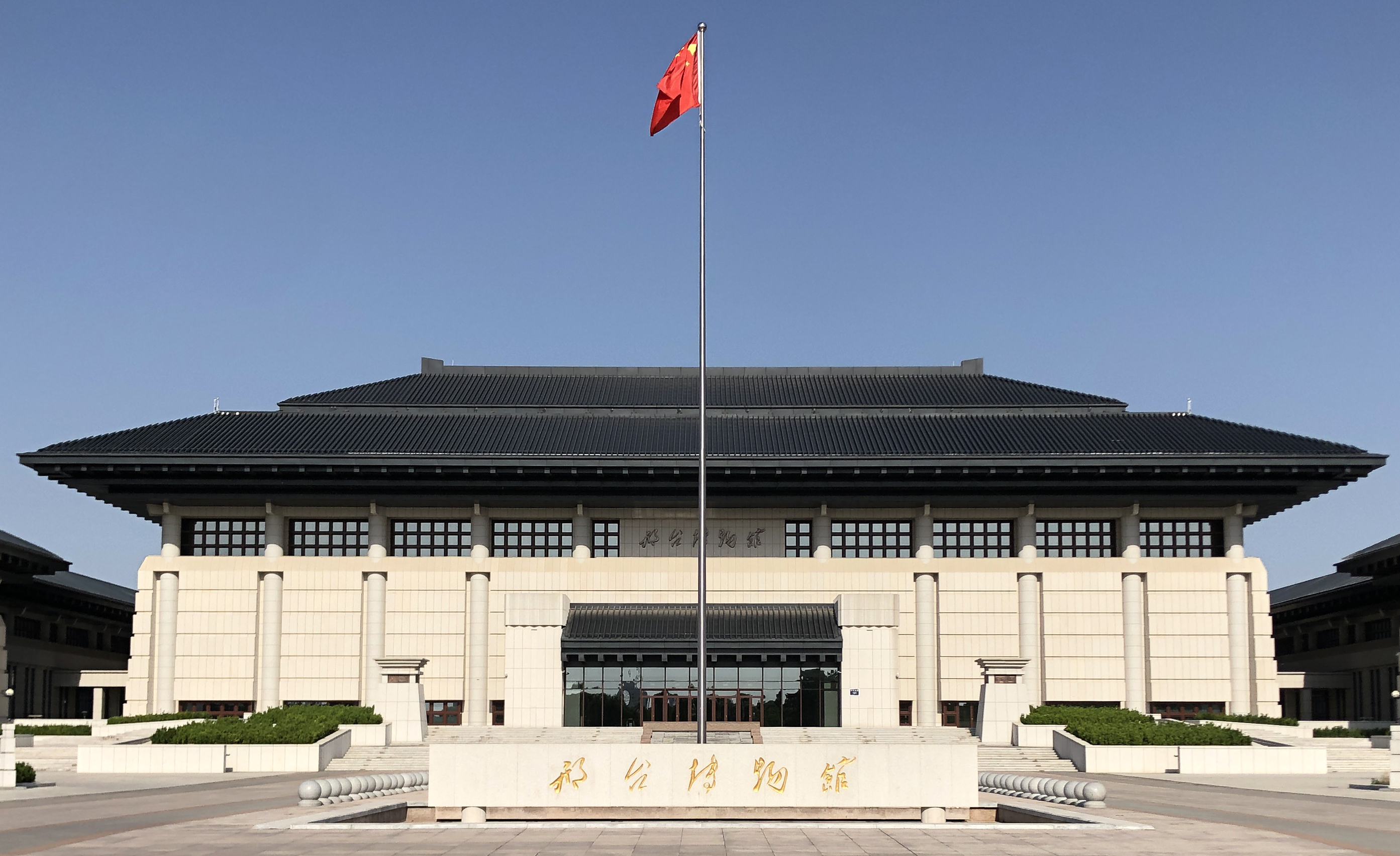
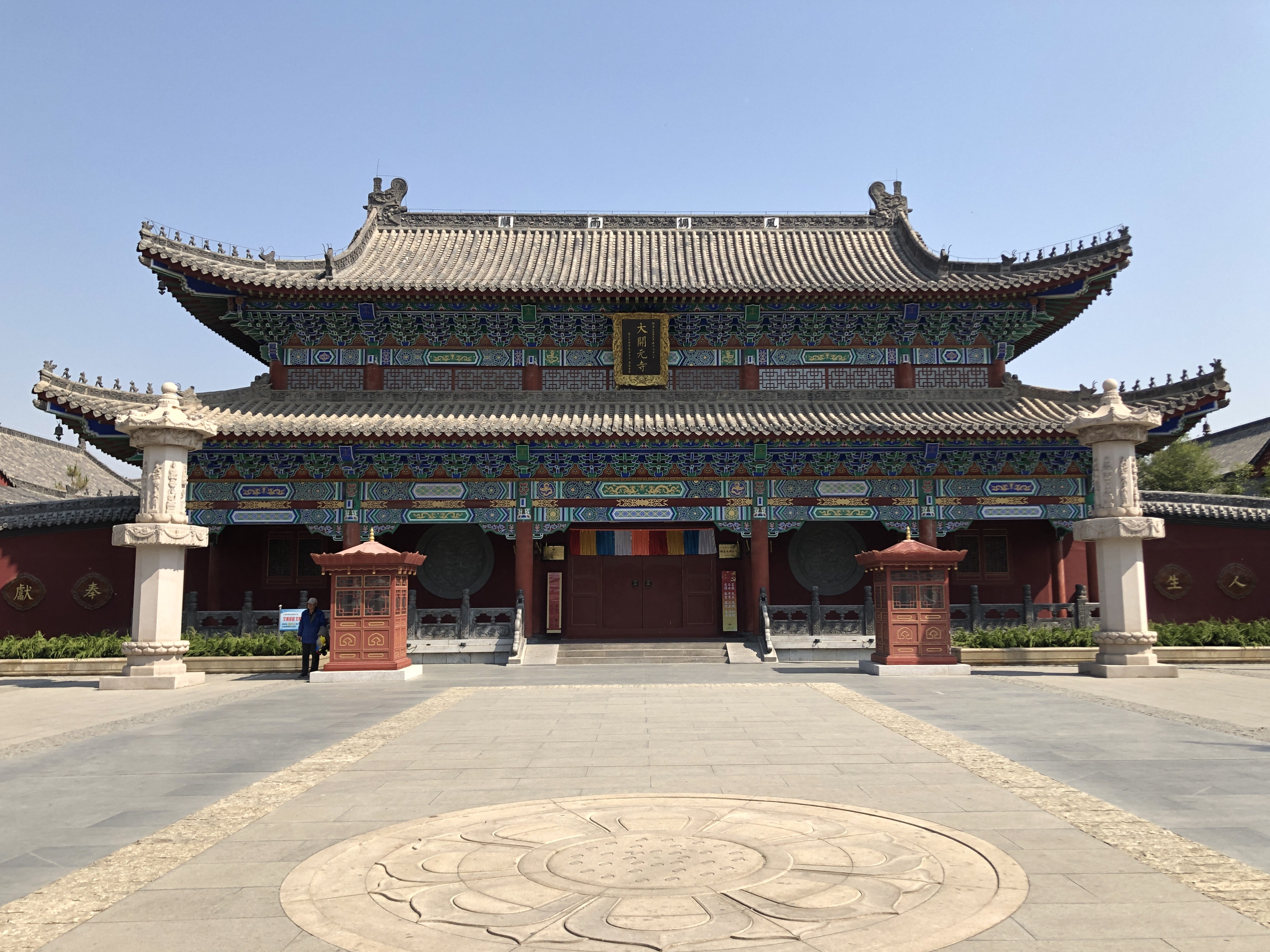
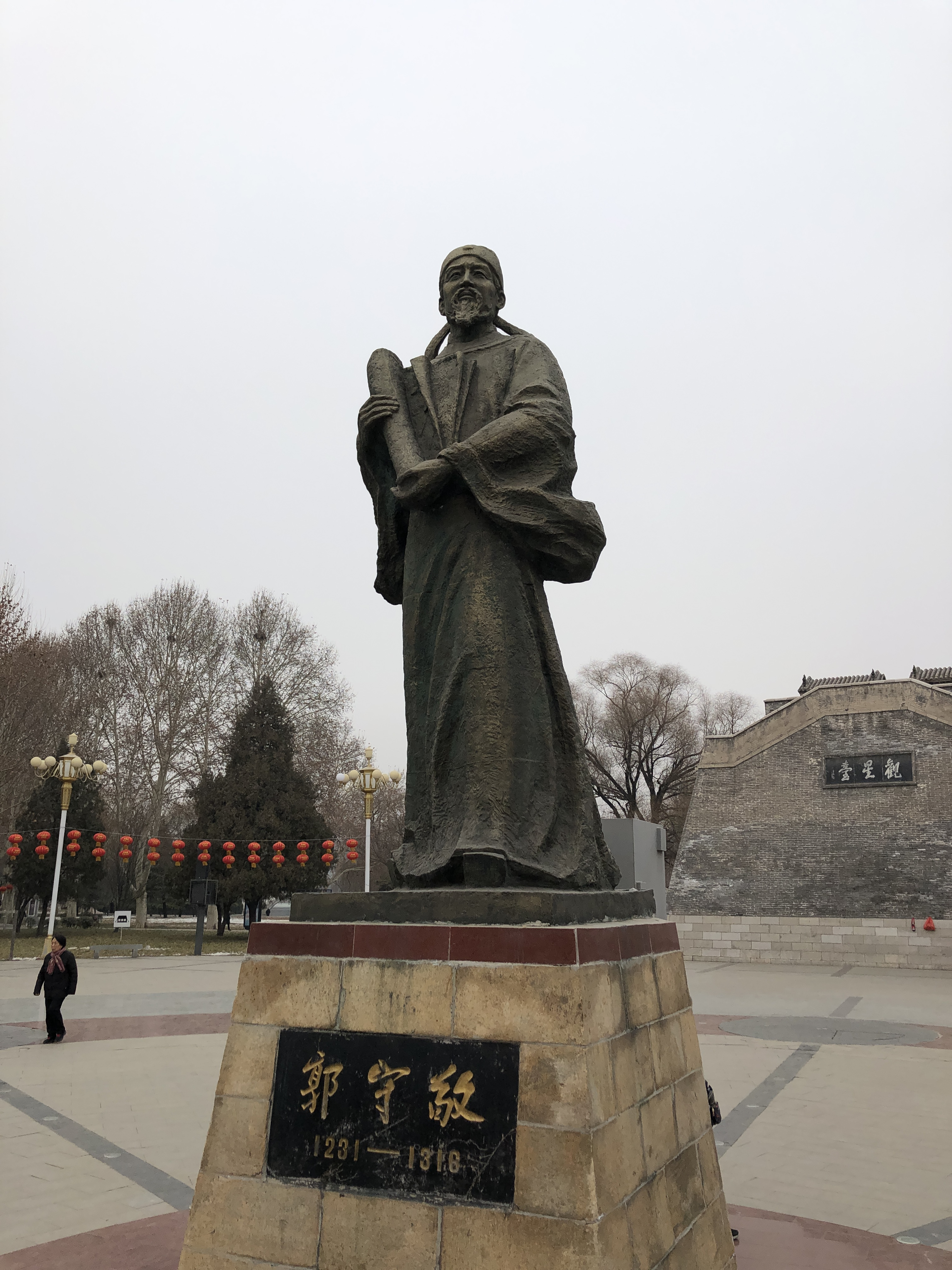
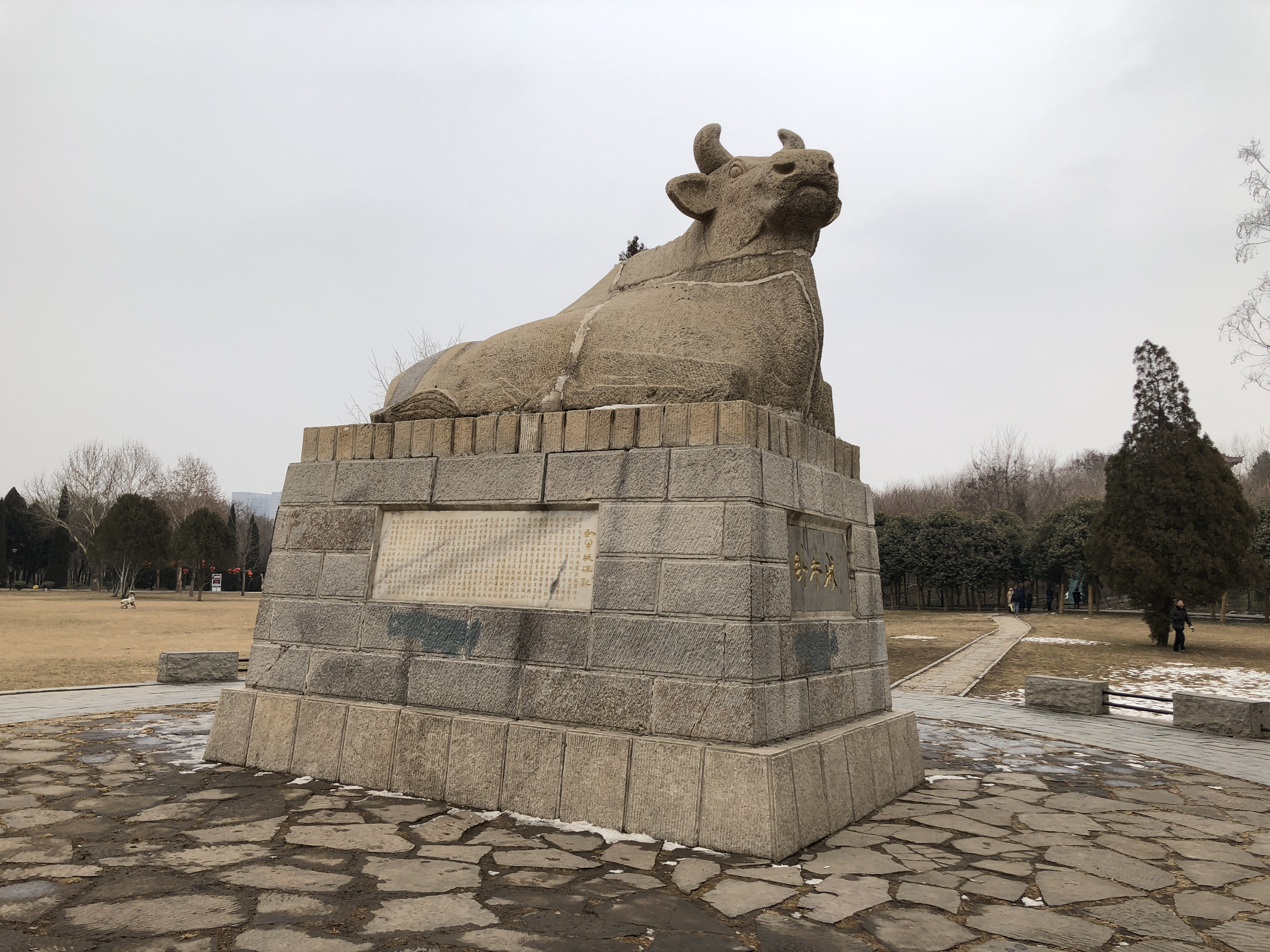
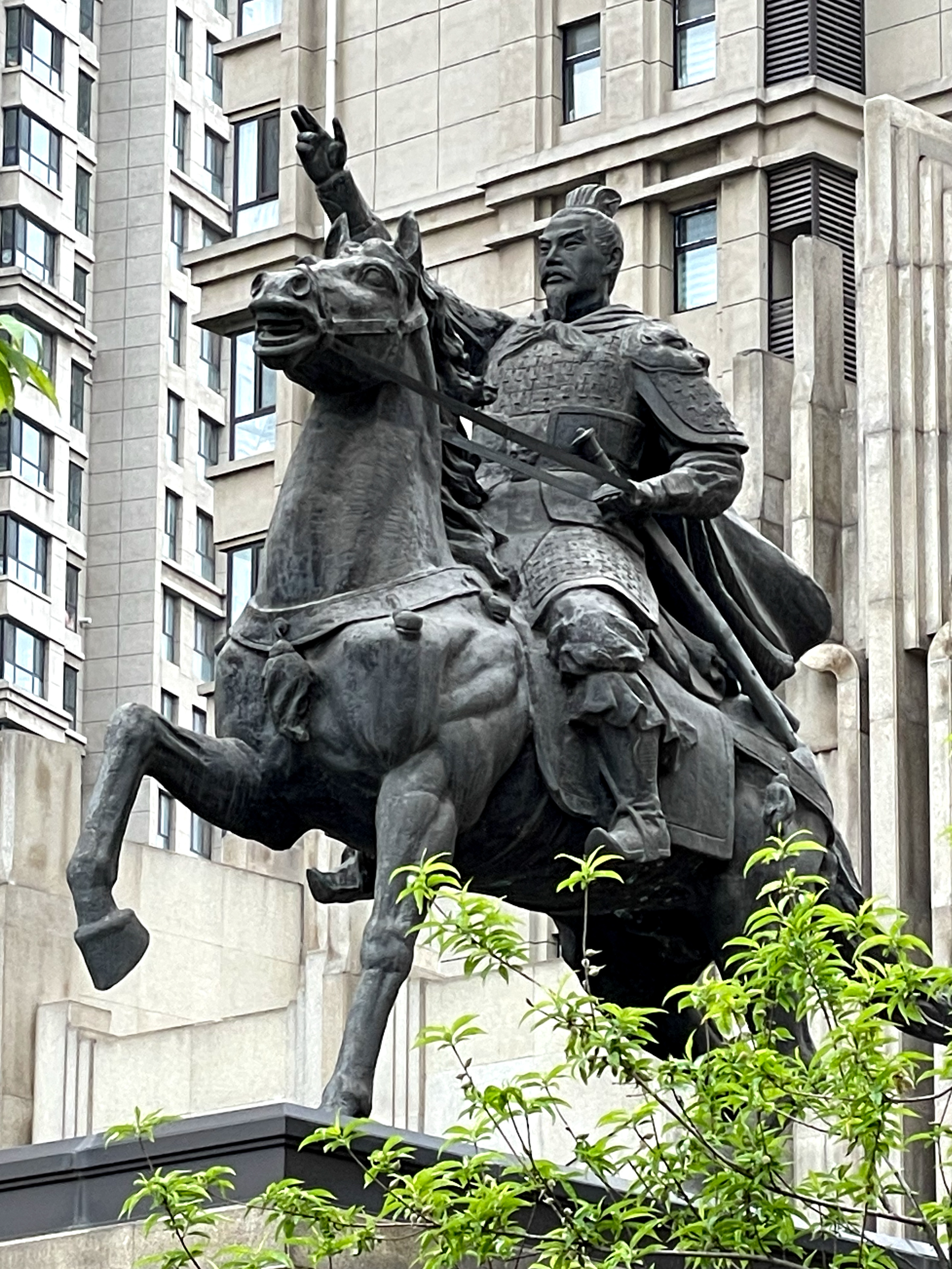
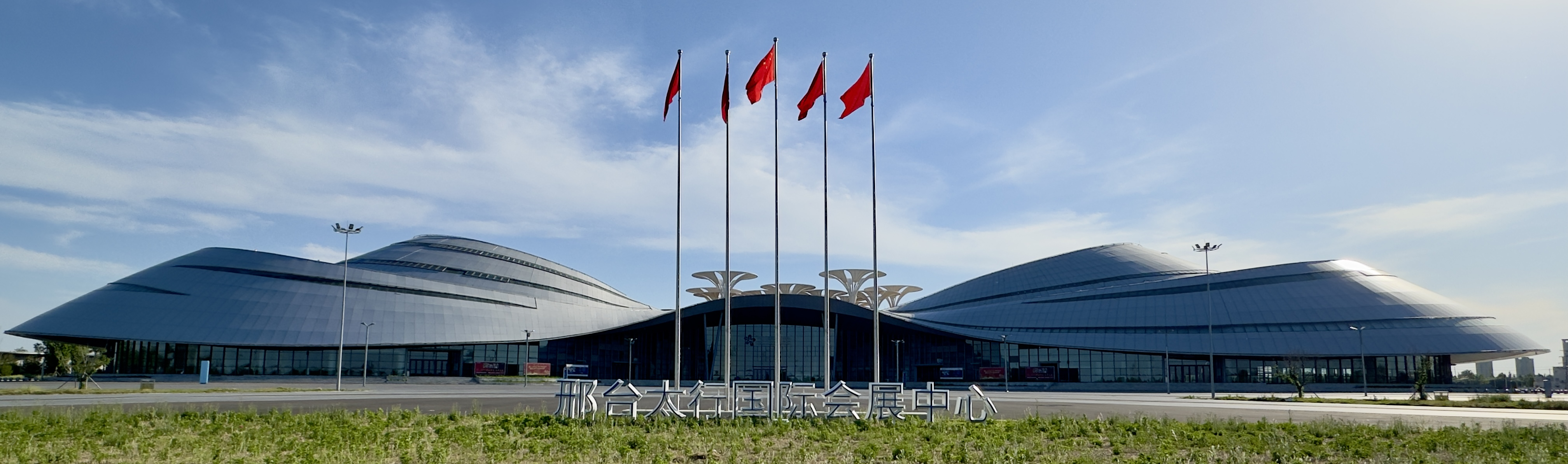
- Xingtai Financial Center Xingtai Museum Kaiyuan Temple Statue of Guo Shoujing Ox Sculpture Statue of Guo Wei Xingtai Taihang International Convention and Exhibition Center
- Nickname: Sitting Bull City (卧牛城)
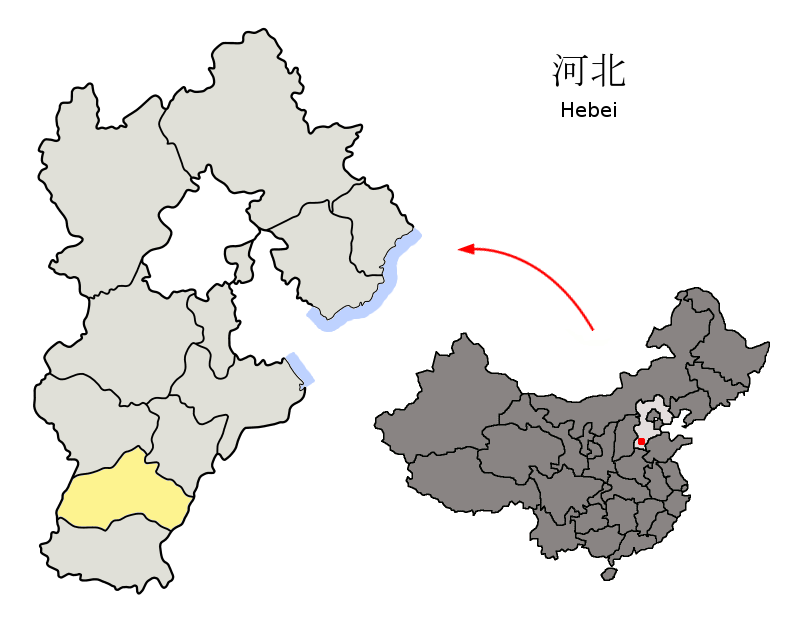
- Location of Xingtai City jurisdiction in Hebei

- Location of the city center in Hebei Xingtai (Northern China) Xingtai (China)
- Coordinates (Xingtai municipal government): 37°04′18″N 114°30′17″E
- Country: People's Republic of China
- Province: Hebei
- Settled: 3500 BC
- Established: November 15, 1983
- Municipal seat: Xindu District

Government
  - CPC Secretary: Tian Guoliang (田国良)
  - Mayor: Shi Lei (石磊)

Area
  - Prefecture-level city: 12,432 km^{2} (4,800 sq mi)
  - Urban: 114.80 km^{2} (44.32 sq mi)
  - Districts: 132.3 km^{2} (51.1 sq mi)

Population (2020 census)
  - Prefecture-level city: 7,111,106
  - Density: 572.00/km^{2} (1,481.5/sq mi)
  - Urban: 971,300
  - Urban density: 8,461/km^{2} (21,910/sq mi)
  - Districts: 971,000

GDP
  - Prefecture-level city: CN¥ 223.6 billion US$ 32.4 billion
  - Per capita: CN¥ 24,256; US$3,894
- Time zone: UTC+8 (China Standard)
- Postal code: 054000
- Area code: 0319
- ISO 3166 code: CN-HE-05
- Vehicle registration: 冀E
- Website: www.xingtai.gov.cn

Xingtai
- Simplified Chinese: 邢台
- Traditional Chinese: 邢臺
- Postal: Hsingtai
- Literal meaning: "temple of Xing"
Transcriptions
Standard Mandarin
- Hanyu Pinyin: Xíngtái
- Wade–Giles: Hsing^{2}-tʻai^{2}

Xingtai (simplified Chinese: 邢台; traditional Chinese: 邢臺; pinyin: Xíngtái; Wade–Giles: Hsing^{²}-tʻai^{²}), formerly known as Xingzhou or Shunde, is a prefecture-level city in southern Hebei province, People's Republic of China. It has a total area of 12,486 km^{2} (4,821 sq mi) and administers 4 districts, 2 county-level cities and 12 counties. At the 2020 census, its population was 7,111,106 inhabitants. By the end of 2024, the total resident population of the city will be 6,877,800. Among them, the resident population of urban areas is 3,921,700. It borders Shijiazhuang and Hengshui in the north, Handan in the south, and the provinces of Shandong and Shanxi in the east and west respectively.

== History ==
Xingtai is the oldest city in North China. The history of Xingtai can be traced back 3500 years ago. During the Shang dynasty, Xingtai functioned as a capital city. During the Zhou dynasty, the State of Xing – from which the present name derives – was founded in the city. During the Warring States period, the state of Zhao made Xingtai its provisional capital. The city was known as Xindu for most of the Qin dynasty, but after the 207 BC Battle of Julu (within present-day Pingxiang County, not today's Julu County), it became known as Xiangguo. During the Sixteen Kingdoms Period, when the Later Zhao was founded by Shi Le of the Jie, the capital was again at Xiangguo. During the Sui and Tang dynasties, the city was known as Xingzhou.

Sui, Tang and Song times saw the zenith of ceramics production in what was the most prolific ceramics center of northern China (rivaling the Yue ware from the South). The white ware and new technologies developed in the Xing kiln mark the transition from proto-porcelain to proper porcelain. More than thirty kiln site have been excavated in different subdivisions of today's Xingtai City and a large high-tech museum have been established in Neiqiu County in 2017.

During the Yuan dynasty, Ming, and Qing dynasties, Xingtai was called Shunde (Shundefu) and functioned as a prefecture in China.

== Geography ==
Xingtai has a continental, monsoon-influenced semi-arid climate (Köppen BSk). It has hot, humid summers due to the East Asian monsoon, and generally cold, windy, very dry winters that reflect the influence of the vast Siberian anticyclone; fall is similar to spring both in temperature and lack of rainfall. In the spring, there are large sandstorms blowing in from the Mongolian steppe, accompanied by rapidly warming, but generally dry, conditions. The annual rainfall, more than half of which falls in July and August alone, is highly variable and not reliable. In the city itself, this amount has averaged to a mere 496.5 mm (19.5 in) per annum.During the year, temperatures typically vary between -6°C and 32°C, rarely falling below -10°C or above 37°C.

Climate data for Xingtai, elevation 77 m (253 ft), (1991–2020 normals, extremes 1971–2010)
Month	Jan	Feb	Mar	Apr	May	Jun	Jul	Aug	Sep	Oct	Nov	Dec	Year
Record high °C (°F)	20.9 (69.6)	27.4 (81.3)	33.9 (93.0)	36.5 (97.7)	39.7 (103.5)	42.4 (108.3)	41.7 (107.1)	38.7 (101.7)	39.0 (102.2)	37.0 (98.6)	27.8 (82.0)	27.6 (81.7)	42.4 (108.3)
Mean daily maximum °C (°F)	3.9 (39.0)	8.2 (46.8)	14.7 (58.5)	21.9 (71.4)	27.6 (81.7)	32.3 (90.1)	32.4 (90.3)	30.7 (87.3)	26.8 (80.2)	21.2 (70.2)	12.4 (54.3)	5.5 (41.9)	19.8 (67.6)
Daily mean °C (°F)	−0.7 (30.7)	3.0 (37.4)	9.1 (48.4)	16.2 (61.2)	22.1 (71.8)	26.6 (79.9)	27.8 (82.0)	26.2 (79.2)	21.6 (70.9)	15.5 (59.9)	7.1 (44.8)	0.9 (33.6)	14.6 (58.3)
Mean daily minimum °C (°F)	−4.3 (24.3)	−1.0 (30.2)	4.4 (39.9)	10.9 (51.6)	16.7 (62.1)	21.4 (70.5)	23.7 (74.7)	22.4 (72.3)	17.3 (63.1)	10.8 (51.4)	3.0 (37.4)	−2.5 (27.5)	10.2 (50.4)
Record low °C (°F)	−20.2 (−4.4)	−15.6 (3.9)	−10.9 (12.4)	−4.9 (23.2)	5.0 (41.0)	9.9 (49.8)	15.7 (60.3)	13.2 (55.8)	5.6 (42.1)	−1.7 (28.9)	−9.2 (15.4)	−17.4 (0.7)	−20.2 (−4.4)
Average precipitation mm (inches)	2.9 (0.11)	6.4 (0.25)	10.3 (0.41)	22.0 (0.87)	43.4 (1.71)	50.1 (1.97)	151.0 (5.94)	117.5 (4.63)	59.8 (2.35)	23.1 (0.91)	15.1 (0.59)	3.9 (0.15)	505.5 (19.89)
Average precipitation days (≥ 0.1 mm)	1.9	3.0	2.9	5.0	6.5	8.5	11.6	9.7	7.5	5.1	4.0	2.5	68.2
Average snowy days	3.4	3.4	1.2	0.2	0	0	0	0	0	0	1.3	3.3	12.8
Average relative humidity (%)	52	50	47	51	53	55	71	74	68	61	61	57	58
Mean monthly sunshine hours	138.0	149.7	189.8	221.4	247.4	215.6	179.5	188.7	172	177.2	144.4	134.5	2,158.2
Percentage possible sunshine	45	49	51	56	56	49	41	45	47	52	48	45	49
Source 1: China Meteorological Administration
Source 2: Weather China

=== Air quality ===
According to a survey conducted by Global Voices China in February 2013, among China's 10 most polluted cities, seven of those cities were located in the province of Hebei (Xingtai, Shijiazhuang, Baoding, Handan, Langfang, Hengshui and Tangshan). Among the 10 cities, Xingtai ranked first in the list with the worst air quality. In 2020, the improvement rates of Xingtai's air quality index and average PM2.5 concentration ranked first in Hebei.

=== Xingtai earthquake ===
A major earthquake, known as the Xingtai earthquake, with magnitude 6.8 on the Richter scale and epicenter in Longyao County occurred in the early morning of March 8, 1966. It was followed by 5 earthquakes above magnitude 6 on the Richter scale that lasted until March 29, 1966. The strongest of these quakes had a magnitude of 7.2 and took place in the southeastern part of Ningjin County on March 22. The earthquake resulted in 8,064 deaths, 38,000 injuries and more than 5 million destroyed houses.

== Administrative divisions ==
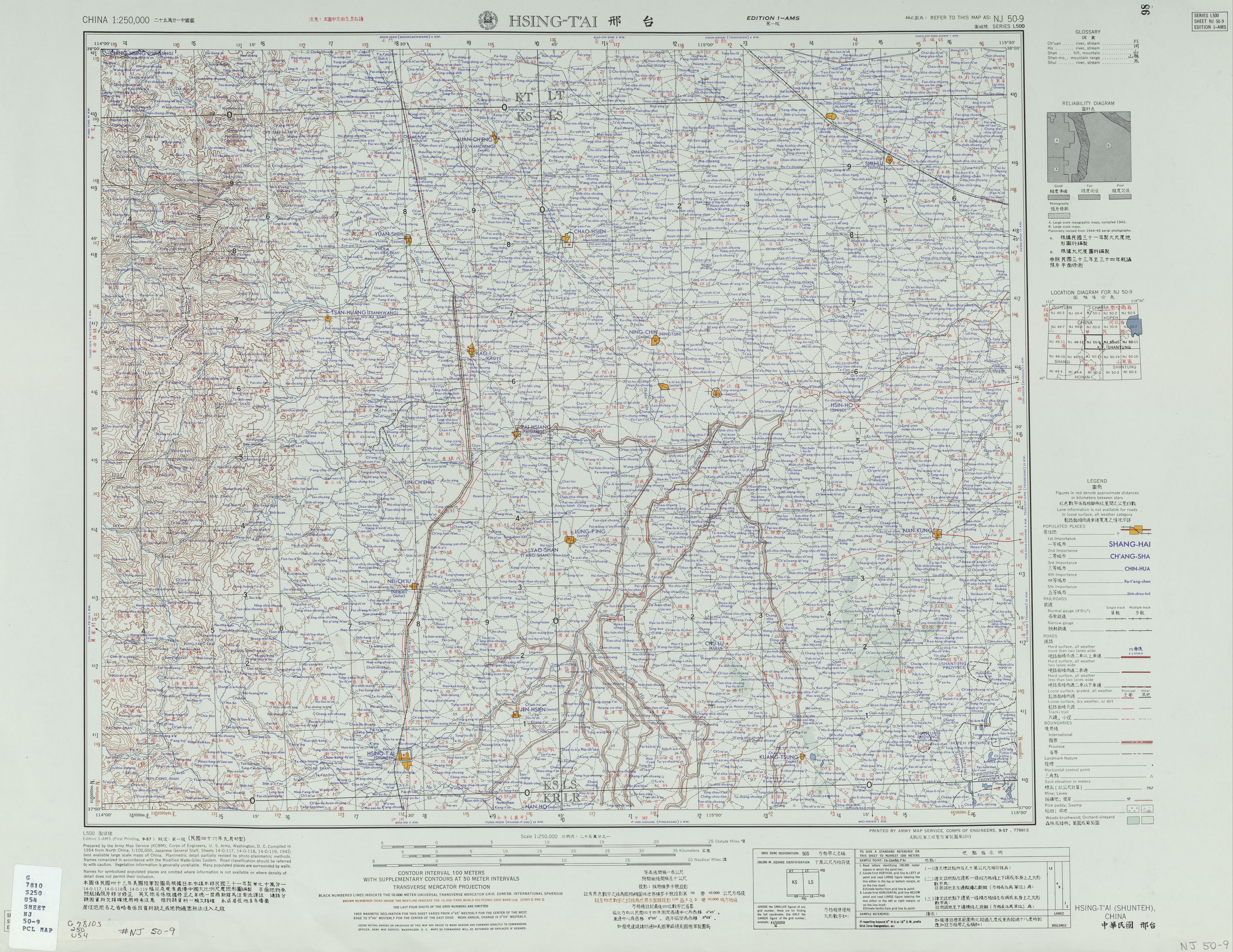
Map including Xingtai (labeled as HSING-T'AI (SHUNTEH) 邢台) (AMS, 1954)

Map
Name	Chinese	Pinyin	Population (2020)	Area (km^{2})
Xiangdu District	襄都区	Xiāngdū Qū	362,857	116
Xindu District	信都区	Xìndū Qū	798,770	1941
Renze District	任泽区	Rènzé Qū	342,869	431
Nanhe District	南和区	Nánhé Qū	350,384	405
Lincheng County	临城县	Línchéng Xiàn	199,793	797
Neiqiu County	内丘县	Nèiqiū Xiàn	260,000	788
Baixiang County	柏乡县	Bǎixiāng Xiàn	168,761	268
Longyao County	隆尧县	Lóngyáo Xiàn	480,447	749
Ningjin County	宁晋县	Níngjìn Xiàn	745,389	1,032
Julu County	巨鹿县	Jùlù Xiàn	346,007	631
Xinhe County	新河县	Xīnhé Xiàn	134,095	366
Guangzong County	广宗县	Guǎngzōng Xiàn	280,603	504
Pingxiang County	平乡县	Píngxiāng Xiàn	323,675	406
Wei County	威县	Wēi Xiàn	496,230	994
Qinghe County	清河县	Qīnghé Xiàn	421,582	500
Linxi County	临西县	Línxī Xiàn	326,968	542
Nangong City	南宫市	Nángōng Shì	396,718	861
Shahe City	沙河市	Shāhé Shì	431,746	859
Xingtai Economic Development Area	邢台经济开发区	Xíng Tái Jīng Jì Kāi Fā Qū	182,585	-
Xingdong New Area	邢东新区	Xíng Dōng Xīn Qū	63,367	-

Xingtai Economic Development Area and Xingdong New Area belong to Xiangdu District.

- Xingtai County - defunct

== Economy ==
Xingtai is the most important base for natural resources in North China, producing 20 million metric tonnes of coal annually. It also features the largest power plant in the southern part of this region of China, with an output of 2.06 gigawatts.

== Transport ==
Xingtai is connected by 4 railways, namely the Beijing−Guangzhou, Beijing−Kowloon, Xingtai-Huanghua and Xingtai-Heshun railways. It is also connected by 5 expressways: the Beijing−Shenzhen (G1), Daqing–Guangzhou (G45), Qingdao−Yinchuan (G20), Dongying–Lüliang (G2516) and Xingtai–Hengshui (S30) expressways. Xingtai is also served by Xingtai Dalian Airport which opened on 18 July 2024.

== Notable persons ==
- Ren Xuefeng
- Hebei Pangzai
- Wei Lijie
- Guo Shoujing
- Liu Bingzhong
- Song Jing
- Chai Rong

== See also ==
- Beiguozhuang
