= S29 Xuchang–Xinyang Expressway =

Road in Henan, China

none Expressway
- Xuxin Expressway 许信高速公路

Route information
- Length: 172.169 km (106.981 mi)
- Existed: 2022–present

Major junctions
- North end: Yulin Interchange connecting G1516/ G0421 in Jian'an District, Xuchang
- G36 in Wuyang, Luohe; Henan S46 (S46) (under construction) in Yancheng District, Luohe; Henan S81 (S81) in Suiping, Zhumadian; Henan S38 (S38) in Queshan, Zhumadian; G3611 in Pingqiao District, Xinyang; G40 in Pingqiao District, Xinyang; G4222 in Shihe District, Xinyang
- South end: Henan-Hubei border near Tanjiahe Township, Shihe District, Xinyang

Location
- Country: China
- Province: Henan

Highway system
- Transport in China

The Xuchang–Xinyang Expressway (Chinese: 许昌－信阳高速公路), designated as S29 in Henan's expressway system, is a currently 172.169-kilometre (106.981 mi) (About 250-kilometre (160 mi) when fully completed) long regional expressway in Henan, China.

== History ==
The original plan first appeared in an announcement issued by Henan People's Government on December 29, 2016. On November 10, 2017, Henan Development and Reform Commission agreed to build this expressway, and one month later on December 26, construction begun after a mobilization meeting. Exactly five years later, The expressway's Suiping to Pingqiao section was open to traffic, and on December 28, 2023, the road was fully completed.

== Exit list ==
From north to south

Location	km	mi	Exit	Name	Destinations	Notes
Henan S29 (Xuchang-Xinyang Expressway)
Continues north towards Dengfeng as G1516
Jian'an District, Xuchang	0	0		Yulin Interchange	G1516 – Yongcheng, Luoyang; G0421 – Tongbai	Northern terminus
Jian'an District, Xuchang	5	3.1		(nameless exit)	X017	
Linying, Luohe	Fancheng Service Area					
Linying, Luohe	15	9.3	15	Fancheng	G344 – Fancheng, Xiangxian	
Yancheng District, Luohe,	22	14	22	Daguo Interchange	Henan S46 (S46) – Zhoukou, Pingdingshan	Henan S46 (Zhoukou - Pingdingshan Expressway) is still under construction
Wuyang, Luohe	41	25	41	Lianhua	G329 – Lianhua, Luohe	
Wuyang, Luohe	50	31	50	Zhuzhuang Interchange	G36 – Nanjing, Luoyang	
Yuanhui District, Luohe	55	34	55	Wenshi	Henan S323 – Wenshi, Daliu	
Xiping, Zhumadian	62	39	62	Xiping West	Henan S222 – Quanzhai, Shiling	
Xiping, Zhumadian	Xiping West Service Area					
Xiping, Zhumadian	71	44	71	Leizu's Hometown	G345 – Xiping, Wugang	
Suiping, Zhumadian	83	52	83	Yushan Interchange	Henan S81 (S81) – Shangqiu, Nanyang	
Suiping, Zhumadian	93	58	93	Chayashan Mountain Scenic Area	Henan S328 – Chayashan Mountain Scenic Area, Suiping	
Suiping, Zhumadian	100	62	100	Wencheng	Henan S241 – Wencheng, Zhushi	
Yicheng District, Zhumadian,	107	66	107	Zhumadian West	Henan S330 (Kaiyuan Avenue), Xuesong Avenue	
Yicheng District, Zhumadian,	Zhumadian West Service Area					
Yicheng District, Zhumadian,	116	72	116	Yifeng	G328 – Yifeng, Humiao	
Queshan, Zhumadian	133	83	133	Hengshan Interchange	Henan S38 (S38) – Xincai, Biyang	
Queshan, Zhumadian	136	85	136	Laoleshan Mountain Scenic Area	Henan S332 / Henan S334 – Wagang, Queshan	
Queshan, Zhumadian	152	94	152	Boshanhu	Henan S223 – Boshan	
Pingqiao District, Xinyang	Xingji Service Area					
Pingqiao District, Xinyang	170	110	170	Xingji Interchange	G3611 – Huaibin; G40 – Shanghai	East end of G3611 concurrency
Pingqiao District, Xinyang	172	107	172	Wanggang Interchange	G3611 – Huaibin; G40 – Xi'an	West end of G3611 concurrency
Pingqiao District, Xinyang				(nameless exit)		Under construction
Shihe District, Xinyang				(nameless exit)	G312	Under construction
Shihe District, Xinyang				(nameless service area&exit)		Under construction
Shihe District, Xinyang				(nameless exit)	X040 – Shihegang	Under construction
Shihe District, Xinyang				(nameless exit)	X040	Under construction
Shihe District, Xinyang	Nanwan Service Area					
Shihe District, Xinyang				(nameless interchange)	G4222 – Shangcheng	Under construction
Shihe District, Xinyang				Tanjiahe	Henan S224 – Tanjiahe	Under construction
Shihe District, Xinyang	(nameless service area)					
Continues south towards Suizhou, Hubei as Hubei SXX (SXX)
Closed/former; Concurrency terminus; HOV only; Incomplete access; Tolled; Route transition; Unopened
