= G0421 Xuchang–Guangzhou Expressway =

Expressway in Henan, Hubei, Hunan and Guangdong provinces of China

Xuchang–Guangzhou Expressway
- 许昌－广州高速公路
- Xuguang Expressway 许广高速公路

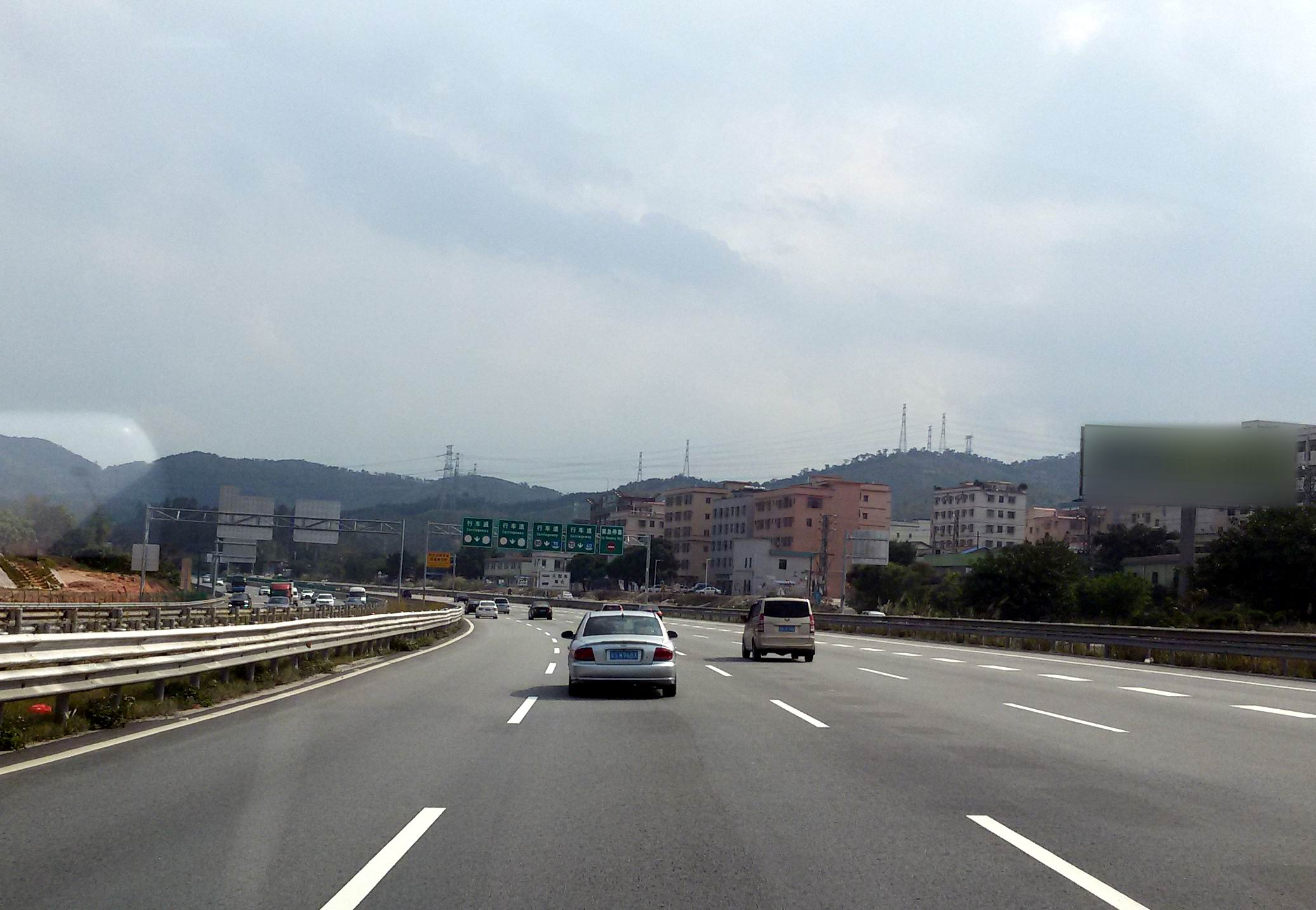
- G0421 Expressway at Shiling

Route information
- Auxiliary route of G4

Major junctions
- North end: Xuchang, Henan
- East end: Guangzhou, Guangdong

Location
- Country: China

Highway system
- National Trunk Highway System; Primary; Auxiliary; National Highways; Transport in China
← G0413	→ G0422

The Xuchang–Guangzhou Expressway (simplified Chinese: 许昌－广州高速公路; traditional Chinese: 許昌－廣州高速公路), designated as G0421 and commonly abbreviated as Xuguang Expressway (Chinese: 许广高速), is an expressway in Central South China linking the cities of Xuchang and Guangzhou. This expressway is a branch of G4 Jinggang'ao Expressway.

== Route ==
G0421 Xuguang Expressway in Hubei Province

North to South
Continues as S32 Yongdeng Expressway; S83 Lannan Expressway
	G4 Jinggang'ao Expressway; S32 Yongdeng Expressway; S83 Lannan Expressway
Concurrent with S32 Yongdeng Expressway; S83 Lannan Expressway
	G311 Road; X010 Road; Xuchang
Concurrent with S32 Yongdeng Expressway
	S32 Yongdeng Expressway
(160)	Xiangcheng
	S242 Road; Pingdingshan
Pingdingshan Service Area
Concurrent with S83 Lannan Expressway
	G36 Ningluo Expressway; S83 Lannan Expressway
Concurrent with G36 Ningluo Expressway
Currently named S49 Jiaotang Expressway	G36 Ningluo Expressway
Currently named S49 Jiaotang Expressway	Liancun
Currently named S49 Jiaotang Expressway	Yexian Service Area
Currently named S49 Jiaotang Expressway	S234 Road; Xindian
Currently named S49 Jiaotang Expressway	Miaojie
Currently named S49 Jiaotang Expressway	S234 Road; S331 Road
Currently named S49 Jiaotang Expressway	Wugang Service Area
Currently named S49 Jiaotang Expressway	S333 Road; Chunshui
Currently named S49 Jiaotang Expressway	Baiyunshan Service Area
Currently named S49 Jiaotang Expressway	S234 Road; Fuzhuang
Currently named S49 Jiaotang Expressway	S38 Xinyang Expressway
Currently named S49 Jiaotang Expressway	X005 Road; Gaoyi
Currently named S49 Jiaotang Expressway	G40 Hushan Expressway
Currently named S49 Jiaotang Expressway	Zhuzhuang
Currently named S49 Jiaotang Expressway	Tongbai Service Area
Currently named S49 Jiaotang Expressway	S206 Road; Tongbai
Currently named S49 Jiaotang Expressway	Toll Station
Henan Province; Hubei Province
	Towards Huaihe
Toll Station
	S328 Road; Towards Tianhekuo
Fengjiang Service Area
	Dongguanzhuang; Towards Gaocheng
	G316 Road; Suizhou
	G70 Fuyin Expressway
	S28 Mazhu Expressway
Junchuan Service Area
	Towards S212 Road; Towards Lülin
	S212 Road; Towards Sanligang
	X006 Road; Towards Sanyang-Pingba
	S243 Road; Towards Songhe
	S311 Road; Yongxing-Caowu; Towards Jingshan
	G42 Hurong Expressway
Tianmen Service Area
	Tianxian Ave; Towards S213 Road- S342 Road; Tianmen
	S213 Road; Yuekou-Zhengchang
	G50 Huyu Expressway
Xiantao Service Area
	X004 Road; Chenchang
	X041 Road; Towards Wangshi-Xingou
	Jianli N Ring Road; Jianli
Jianli Service Area
	S303 Road; Zhuhe
	S303 Road; Bailuo
North Jingyue Bridge Toll Station
Jingyue Yangtze Bridge
Hubei Province; Hunan Province
	South Jingyue Bridge Toll Station
	S201 Road; Daorenji
	G107 Road; Yueyang-Yunxi
Yeyang Service Area
	G56 Hangrui Expressway
	Towards Yueyang
Under Construction
	S306 Road; Xinkai
Under Construction
	X062 Road; Tongguan
	S101 Road; Wangcheng
	X076 Road; Towards Wushan
	G5513 Changzhang Expressway
	G319 Road; Bairuopu; Towards Changsha-Ningxiang
	X079 Road; Lianhua
	X081 Road; Daolin
Daolin Service Area
	X011 Road; Xiangtang
	G60 Hukun Expressway
	G320 Road; Jiangshe
	X018 Road; Hekou
Shebu Service Area
	X021 Road; Shebu
	X022 Road; Paitou
	S314 Road; Towards Baiguo-Xinqiao
	X034 Road; Maji
Xiepoyan Service Area
	X045 Road; Shishi
	S80 Hengshao Expressway
	G322 Road; Hengyang
	G72 Quannan Expressway
	S214 Road; Hengnan
	S320 Road; Changning
	S214 Road; Luoqiao-Miaoqian
	S322 Road; Liufeng
	X069 Road; Shizi-Yutian
	S322 Road; Hanglang
	G76 Xiarong Expressway
	X082 Road; Maishi
Linwu Service Area
	S324 Road; Chujiang
	S324 Road; Linwu
	S324 Road; Yingchun
Yizhang West Service Area
	S31 Yifeng Expressway
Hunan Province; Guangdong Province
Currently Named; Qinglian Expressway Currently; Concurrent with G107 Road	S346 Road; Dalubian
Currently Named; Qinglian Expressway Currently; Concurrent with G107 Road	S346 Road; Xingzi
Currently Named; Qinglian Expressway Currently; Concurrent with G107 Road	Lianzhou Service Area
Currently Named; Qinglian Expressway Currently; Concurrent with G107 Road	X835 Road; Bao'an
Currently Named; Qinglian Expressway Currently; Concurrent with G107 Road	G323 Road; Lianzhou
Currently Named; Qinglian Expressway Currently; Concurrent with G107 Road	G55 Erguang Expressway
Currently Named; Qinglian Expressway Currently; Concurrent with G107 Road	G323 Road; S261 Road; Liannan
Currently Named; Qinglian Expressway Currently; Concurrent with G107 Road	S114 Road; S261 Road; Sanpai
Currently Named; Qinglian Expressway Currently; Concurrent with G107 Road	Yangshan Service Area
Currently Named; Qinglian Expressway Currently; Concurrent with G107 Road	X830 Road; Libu-Zhaigang
Currently Named; Qinglian Expressway Currently; Concurrent with G107 Road	Yangshan
Currently Named; Qinglian Expressway Currently; Concurrent with G107 Road	S260 Road; Yangshan
Currently Named; Qinglian Expressway Currently; Concurrent with G107 Road	S260 Road; Dubu
Currently Named; Qinglian Expressway Currently; Concurrent with G107 Road	S114 Road; Qigong
Currently Named; Qinglian Expressway Currently; Concurrent with G107 Road	Yangshan South Service Area
Currently Named; Qinglian Expressway Currently; Concurrent with G107 Road	S114 Road; Shitan
Currently Named; Qinglian Expressway Currently; Concurrent with G107 Road	G78 Shankun Expressway
Currently Named; Qinglian Expressway Currently; Concurrent with G107 Road	S114 Road; Jintan
Currently Named; Qinglian Expressway Currently; Concurrent with G107 Road	Qingxing Service Area
Currently Named; Qinglian Expressway Currently; Concurrent with G107 Road	S114 Road; Heyun
Currently Named; Qinglian Expressway Currently; Concurrent with G107 Road	S114 Road; S350 Road; Longjing
Currently Named; Qinglian Expressway Currently; Concurrent with G107 Road	S14 Shanzhang Expressway
Toll Station
Toll Station
Under Construction
Currently named S110 Guangqing Expressway	S114 Road; S354 Road; Qingyuan
Currently named S110 Guangqing Expressway	Toll Station
Currently named S110 Guangqing Expressway	S114 Road; Qingyuan-Henghe
Currently named S110 Guangqing Expressway	S253 Road; Longtang
Currently named S110 Guangqing Expressway	G107 Road Yizhan Hot Spring
Currently named S110 Guangqing Expressway; Running parallel with G107 Road	G94 Pearl River Delta Ring Expressway
Currently named S110 Guangqing Expressway; Running parallel with G107 Road	S381 Road; Shiling
Currently named S110 Guangqing Expressway; Running parallel with G107 Road	X283 Road; Huadu
Currently named S110 Guangqing Expressway; Running parallel with G107 Road	S118 Road; Huadu
Currently named S110 Guangqing Expressway; Running parallel with G107 Road	Guangzhou Metropolitan Area
Currently named S110 Guangqing Expressway; Running parallel with G107 Road	S267 Road; Jianggao
Currently named S110 Guangqing Expressway; Running parallel with G107 Road	G15 Shenhai Expressway; G1501 Guangzhou Ring Expressway
Currently named S110 Guangqing Expressway; Running parallel with G107 Road	X147 Road; X280 Road; Jianggao
Currently named S110 Guangqing Expressway; Running parallel with G107 Road	G107 Road; Jianggao
Currently named S110 Guangqing Expressway; Running parallel with G107 Road	X266 Road; Jianggao
Currently named S110 Guangqing Expressway; Running parallel with G107 Road	S303 Huanan Expressway; G321 Road; Shijing
Currently named S110 Guangqing Expressway; Running parallel with G107 Road	Toll Station
Currently named S110 Guangqing Expressway; Running parallel with G107 Road	Shijing
Currently named S110 Guangqing Expressway; Running parallel with G107 Road	S15 Shenhai Expressway Guangzhou Branch; S81 Guangzhou Ring Expressway
Continues as Zengcha Ave
South to North
