= Suzhou–Dengfeng Expressway =

Road in Henan and Anhui, China

Yongcheng–Dengfeng Expressway
- Yongdeng Expressway 永登高速公路

Route information
- Length: 339 km (211 mi)
- Existed: 2007–present

Major junctions
- East end: Border of Henan and Anhui near Yongcheng, Shangqiu, Henan
- G0321 – Yongcheng, Shangqiu; G35 – Bozhou; G45 – Zhoukou; G4 – Xuchang
- West end: S85 Zhengzhou–Shaolinsi Expressway, Dengfeng, Zhengzhou, Henan

Location
- Country: China
- Province: Henan

Highway system
- Transport in China

The Yongcheng–Dengfeng Expressway (Chinese: 永城－登封高速公路) designated as S32 in Henan's expressway system, is 339-kilometre (211 mi) long regional expressway in Henan and Anhui (designated as S06 in Anhui), China.

== Detailed itinerary ==
From east to west
Continues as G1516 Yanluo Expressway
G0321 Deshang Expressway
Yongcheng South; S201 Road; Yongcheng, Shangqiu
Yongcheng South Service Area
Yongbo Toll Station
Anhui section, designated as G1516 Yanluo Expressway
G35 Jiguang Expressway
Bozhou North; G105 Road; Bozhou
Qiaocheng Service Area
Anhui section, designated as G1516 Yanluo Expressway
Bolu Toll Station
Luyi; S207 Road; Luyi County, Zhoukou
Qiuji; S210 Road; Luyi County, Zhoukou
Luyi Service Area
Tangji; S206 Road; Luyi County, Zhoukou
S81 Shangnan Expressway
Taikang; G106 Road; Taikang County, Zhoukou
Linlou Service Area
G45 Daguang Expressway
Fugou; S102 Road; Fugou County, Zhoukou
S89 Jixi Expressway
Yanling South; S219 Road; Yanling County, Xuchang
S83 Lannan Expressway
Concurrent with S83 Lannan Expressway
G4 Beijing–Hong Kong and Macau Expressway
Xuchang South Service Area
Xuchang South; Jian'an District, Xuchang
Concurrent with S83 Lannan Expressway
S83 Lannan Expressway
Xuchang West; S237 Road; Jian'an District, Xuchang
Guodian Service Area
S88 Zhengxi Expressway
Yuzhou North; S103 Road; Yuzhou, Xuchang
Yuzhou West Service Area
Changzhuang; S325 Road; Yuzhou, Xuchang
Xuanhua; X044 Road; Dengfeng, Zhengzhou
Dengfeng Service Area
Ludian; S237 Road; Dengfeng, Zhengzhou
S49 Linru Expressway
Concurrent with S49 Linru Expressway
S85 Zhengshao Expressway; Dengfeng, Zhengzhou
Concurrent with S49 Linru Expressway
Continues as S49 Linru Expressway
From west to east
