= S88 Zhengzhou–Luanchuan Expressway =

Road in Henan, China

Zhengzhou–Xixia Expressway
- Zhengluan Expressway 郑栾高速公路
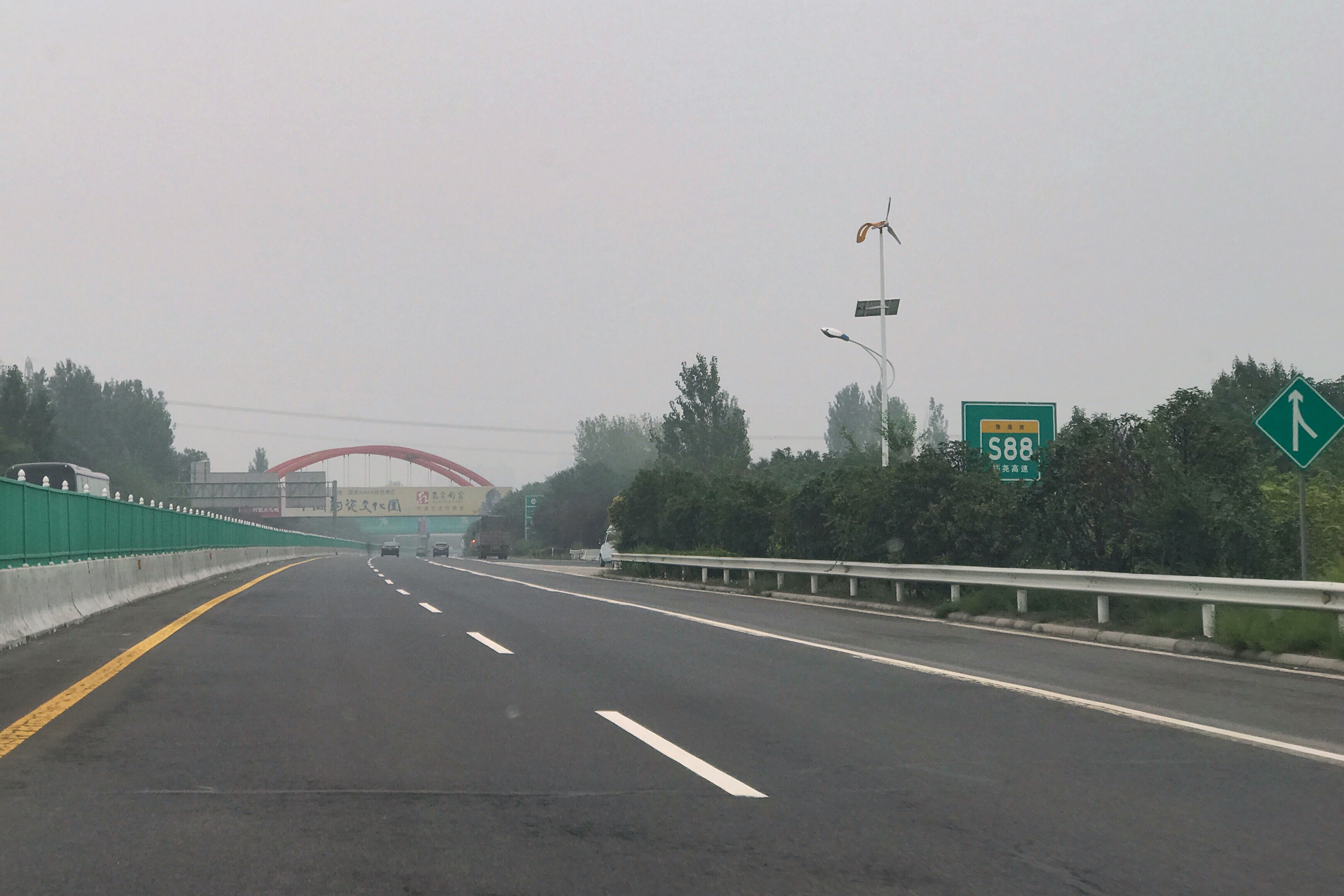

Route information
- Length: 276.87 km (172.04 mi)
- Existed: 2007–present

Major junctions
- Northeast end: Houzhai Toll Station, Erqi District, Zhengzhou, Henan
- G3001 in Erqi District, Zhengzhou; Henan S60 in Xinmi, Zhengzhou; G1516 in Yuzhou, Xuchang; G36 in Baofeng County, Pingdingshan; G55 in Lushan County, Pingdingshan
- Southwest end: Henan S57 (S57) / Henan S96 (S96) in Miaozi Town, Luanchuan, Luoyang

Location
- Country: China
- Province: Henan

Highway system
- Transport in China

The Zhengzhou–Luanchuan Expressway (Chinese: 郑州－栾川高速公路), designated as S88 in Henan's expressway system, is 276.87-kilometre (172.04 mi) long regional expressway in Henan, China. Currently it's fully completed

== History ==
Before 2019, the expressway was called Henan S88 (Zhengzhou–Xixia Expressway), and the southern end was planned to reach Xixia County. The first section of the expressway, which is from Zhengzhou to Shirenshan (now Yaoshan), was opened on 21 December 2007. It was originally called Zhengshi Expressway (Zhengzhou–Shirenshan). After Shirenshan's renaming to Yaoshan in 2008, the expressway's name was also changed to Zhengyao Expressway (Zhengzhou–Yaoshan)

The Yaoshan–Luanchuan section commenced construction in late 2016. In 2019, the Luanchuan–Xixia section was re-designated as part of Henan S57 (Mianchi–Xichuan Expressway) and the remaining part (Zhengzhou - Luanchuan section) was renamed as Zhengzhou - Luanchuan (Zhengluan) Expressway.

== Exit list ==
From north to south

Location	km	mi	Exit	Name	Destinations	Notes
Henan S88 (Zhengzhou–Luanchuan Expressway)
Continues north towards downtown Zhengzhou as Songshan S. Road
Erqi District, Zhengzhou	Houzhai Toll Booth					
Erqi District, Zhengzhou			1 A-B	Houzhai Interchange	G3001 – Other destinations in Zhengzhou	
Xinzheng, Zhengzhou	Zhengzhou South Service Area					
Xinmi, Zhengzhou	16.2	10.1	16	Xuanyuanqiu	Henan S321 – Quliang	
Xinmi, Zhengzhou				Henan S60 – Xinzheng, Dengfeng		
Xinzheng, Zhengzhou	30.2	18.8	31	Xinzheng West	Henan S323 – Xindian, Xinzheng	
Changge, Xuchang	49.1	30.5	49	Changge West	Henan S325 – Pohu, Changge	
Yuzhou, Xuchang	Yuzhou Service Area					
Yuzhou, Xuchang			59	G1516 – Xuchang, Dengfeng		
Yuzhou, Xuchang	63.8	39.6	64	Yuzhou East	Henan S237 – Yuzhou	
Yuzhou, Xuchang	73.9	45.9	74	Yuzhou South	Henan S103 – Yuzhou	
Jia County, Pingdingshan	94.3	58.6	94	Jiaxian	Longshan Avenue – Jiaxian	
Baofeng County, Pingdingshan				Baofeng Interchange	G36 – Pingdingshan, Ruzhou	
Baofeng County, Pingdingshan				Pingdingshan West	Baofeng, Pingdingshan	
Lushan County, Pingdingshan	Pingdingshan South Service Area					
Lushan County, Pingdingshan	135.3	84.1	135	Lushan	Henan S231 – Lushan	
Lushan County, Pingdingshan	160	99	160	Xiatang	G207 / G311 – Xiatang	
Lushan County, Pingdingshan				Xiatang Interchange	G55 – Luoyang, Nanyang	
Lushan County, Pingdingshan	179	111	179	Yaoshan	G311 – Yaoshan Town	
Lushan County, Pingdingshan	Yaoshan East Service Area					
Lushan County, Pingdingshan	196	122	196	Yaoshan West	G311 – Yaoshan Town, Mount Yao	
Song County, Luoyang	213	132	213	Muzhaling	G311 – Muzhaling, Checun	
Song County, Luoyang	Baiyunshan Service Area					
Song County, Luoyang	238	148	238	Baiyunshan	Tiantong Road, Mount Baiyun, Heyu	
Song County, Luoyang	255	158	255	Longyuwan	G311 – Longyunwan, Miaozi	
Song County, Luoyang	258	160	258	Miaozi Interchange	Henan S96 (S96) – Luanchuan, Luoyang	
Continues south as Henan S57 (S57)
Closed/former; Concurrency terminus; HOV only; Incomplete access; Tolled; Route transition; Unopened
