= S38 Xincai–Biyang Expressway =

Road in Henan, China

Xincai–Biyang Expressway
- Xinyang Expressway 新阳高速公路
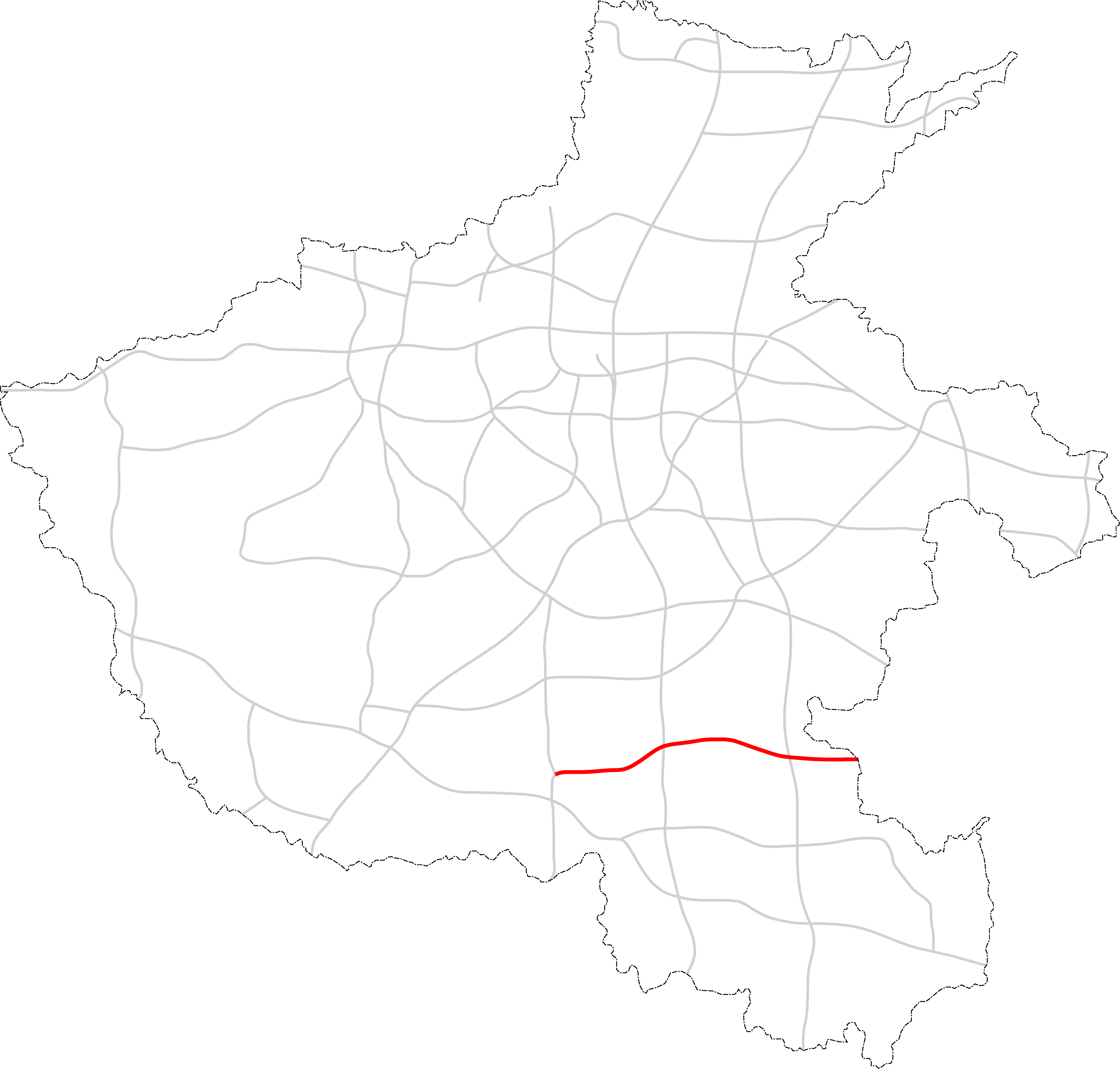

Route information
- Length: 163.5 km (101.6 mi)
- Existed: 2011–present

Major junctions
- East end: Border of Henan and Anhui near Xincai County, Zhumadian, Henan
- G45 in Xincai County, Zhumadian; G4 in Yicheng District, Zhumadian
- West end: G0421 Biyang County, Zhumadian

Location
- Country: China
- Province: Henan

Highway system
- Transport in China

The Xincai–Biyang Expressway (Chinese: 新蔡－泌阳高速公路), often abbreviated as Xinyang Expressway (Chinese: 新阳高速) and designated S38 in Henan's expressway system, is 163.5-kilometre (101.6 mi) long regional expressway in Henan, China.

The expressway was completed and opened in 2011.

== Exit list ==
Location	km	mi	Exit	Name	Destinations	Notes
Henan S38 (Xincai–Biyang Expressway)
Continues east as Anhui S12
Xincai County, Zhumadian				Licheng	Henan S335 – Licheng	
Xincai County, Zhumadian	26.4	16.4		Xincai	G106 – Xincai	
Xincai County, Zhumadian				Xincai Interchange	G45 – Zhoukou, Xixian	
Pingyu County, Zhumadian	Pingyu Service Area					
Pingyu County, Zhumadian	56.7	35.2		Pingyu	Henan S213 – Pingyu	
Runan County, Zhumadian	82.4	51.2		Runan	Henan S219 – Runan	
Runan County, Zhumadian	Runan Service Area					
Yicheng District, Zhumadian				Zhumadian Interchange	G4 – Zhumadian, Xinyang	
Yicheng District, Zhumadian	114.2	71.0		Zhumadian Tianzhong	G107 – Zhumadian, Queshan	
Queshan County, Zhumadian	127	79		West Queshan	Henan S334 – Queshan	
Queshan County, Zhumadian	146.7	91.2		Zhugou	Henan S206 / Henan S334 – Zhugou	
Biyang County, Zhumadian				Tongshanhu Interchange	G0421 (currently designated as Henan S49) – Biyang, Wugang, Tongbai	
Biyang County, Zhumadian	Tongshanhu Service Area					
Closed/former; Concurrency terminus; HOV only; Incomplete access; Tolled; Route transition; Unopened
