= S85 =

S85 may refer to:

- S85 (Berlin), a S-Bahn line
- BMW S85, an automobile engine
- Daihatsu Hijet (S85), a kei truck and microvan
- S85 Zhengzhou–Shaolinsi Expressway, China
- Soviet submarine S-85
