= S37 Lankao–Xuchang Expressway =

Road in Henan, China

none Expressway
- Lanxu Expressway 兰许高速公路

Route information
- Length: 120 km (75 mi)
- Existed: 2005–present

Major junctions
- Northeast end: Lankao West Interchange connecting G30 / G1511 in Lankao, Kaifeng, Henan
- Henan S82 (S82) in Xiangfu District, Kaifeng; G45 in Tongxu County, Kaifeng; Henan S60 (S60) in Weishi County, Kaifeng; G0424 in Weishi County, Kaifeng; Henan S42 (S42) in Yanling, Xuchang (under construction)
- Southwest end: Xuchang East Interchange connecting G1516 in Jian'an District, Xuchang

Location
- Country: China
- Province: Henan

Highway system
- Transport in China

The Lankao–Xuchang Expressway (Chinese: 兰考－许昌高速公路), often abbreviated as Lanxu Expressway (Chinese: 兰许高速) and designated as S37 in Henan's expressway system, is a 114-kilometre (71 mi) long regional expressway in Henan, China. Currently it's fully completed.

== History ==
Before July 8, 2024, this expressway was a part of Lannan Expressway (Chinese: 兰南高速公路) which started at Lankao and ended at Nanyang. The first phase of the expressway is from Xuchang to Nanyang via Pingdingshan and was called as Xupingnan Expressway (Chinese: 许平南高速公路). This section was opened on 12 December 2004 and provided expressway connections to the above-mentioned three major cities in Henan. The second phase (Lankao–Xuchang section, called Lanxu Expressway) was opened on 19 November 2005. The third phase was opened on December 19, 2005.

The Xuchang–Ye County section has also been designated as G0421.

On July 8, 2024, the latest version of Henan Expressway numbering was released by Henan Provincial Department of Transportation. The previous Henan S83 (Lankao–Nanyang Expressway) was abolished. Instead, the Ye County-Nanyang section was redesignated as G3612, and the name Lanxu Expressway was restored on Lankao-Xuchang section.

== Exit list ==
From northeast to southwest:

Location	km	mi	Exit	Name	Destinations	Notes
Henan S83 (Lankao–Nanyang Expressway)
Continues northeast towards Heze as G1511
Xiangfu District, Kaifeng	0	0	0 A-B	Lankao West Interchange	G30 – Kaifeng, Shangqiu; G1511 – Heze	
Xiangfu District, Kaifeng	10.8	6.7	11	Erlangmiao	Henan S213 – Erlangmiao, Qixian	
Xiangfu District, Kaifeng	Chenliu Parking Area					
Xiangfu District, Kaifeng				Qiulou Interchange	Henan S82 (S82) – Kaifeng, Minquan	
Tongxu County, Kaifeng			34	Zhusha Interchange	G45 – Puyang, Zhoukou	No ramp towards northbound G45 for westbound S37 and vice versa
Tongxu County, Kaifeng	40.9	25.4	41	Tongxu	G240 (Yingbin Avanue) / Henan S222 – Tongxu	
Tongxu County, Kaifeng	Tongxu Service Area					
Weishi County, Kaifeng				Weishi East Interchange	Henan S60 (S60) – Xinzheng, Shangqiu	
Weishi County, Kaifeng	59	37	59	Weishi	G240 – Weishi	
Weishi County, Kaifeng				Weishi South Interchange	G0424 – Zhongmu, Zhoukou	
Yanling County, Xuchang	90.8	56.4	91	Yanling North	Henan S319 – Pengdian	
Yanling County, Xuchang	92	57	92	Xiefang Interchange	Henan S42 (S42) – Yongcheng, Lingbao	Under construction
Yanling County, Xuchang	Yanling Service Area					
Yanling County, Xuchang	102.2	63.5	102	Yanling West	G311 (Huadu Avenue) – Yanling	
Jian'an District, Xuchang				Xuchang East Interchange	G1516 – Xuchang, Luoyang	Westbound exit and eastbound entrance only
Continues southwest towards Xuchang as G1516
Closed/former; Concurrency terminus; HOV only; Incomplete access; Tolled; Route transition; Unopened
