= S85 Zhengzhou–Shaolinsi Expressway =

Road in Henan, China

Zhengzhou–Shaolinsi Expressway
- Zhengshao Expressway 郑少高速
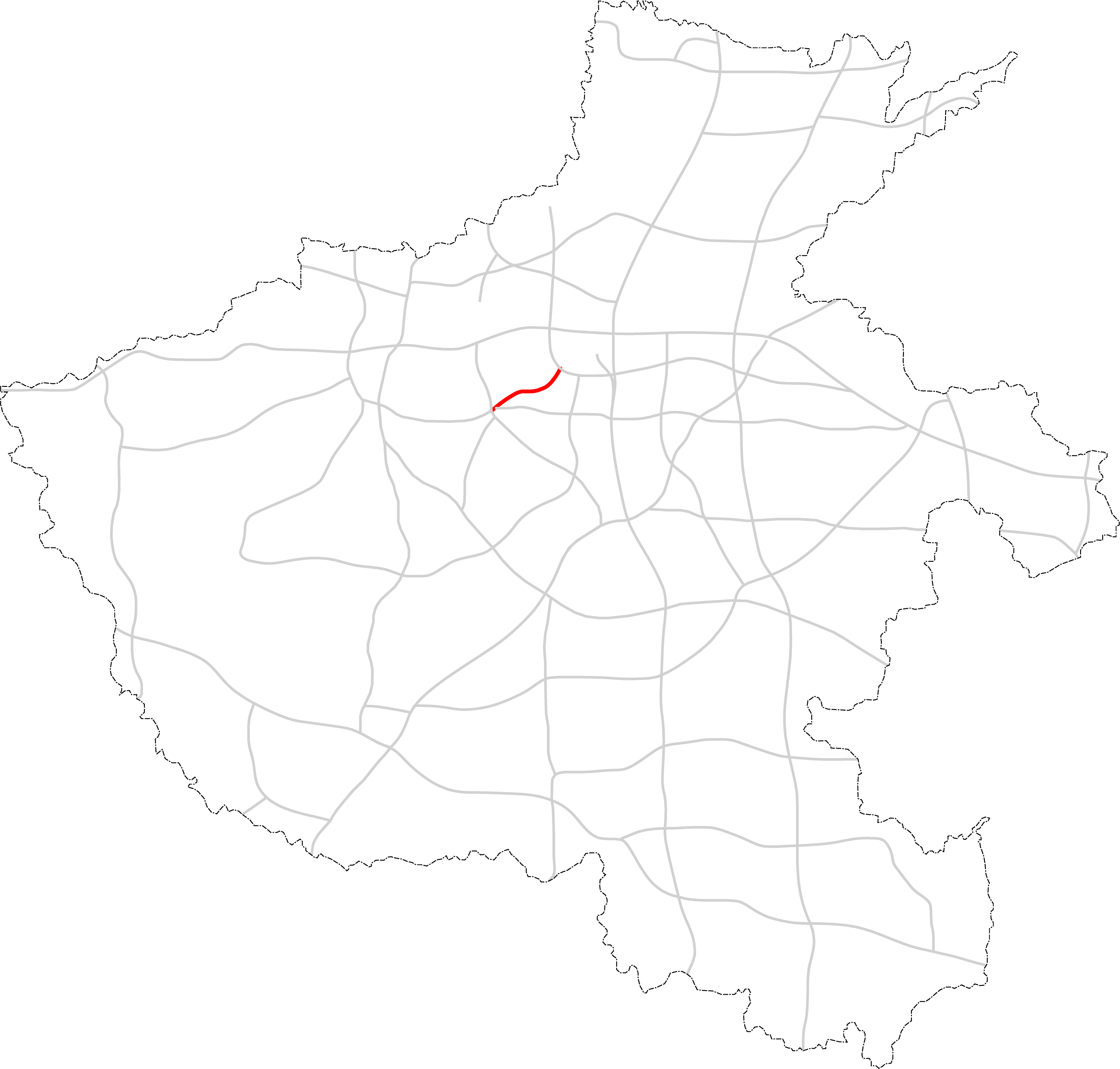

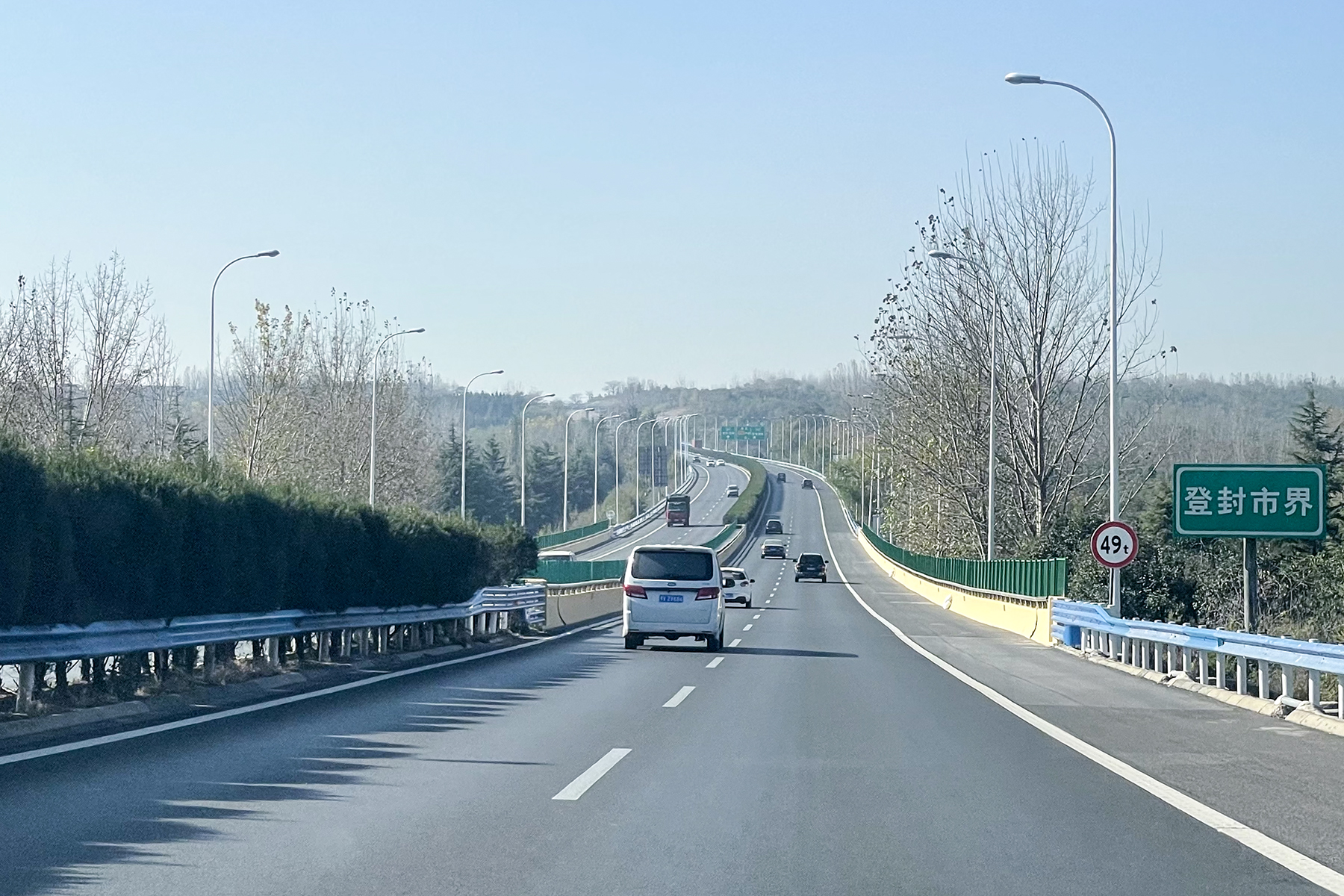

Route information
- Length: 53.254 km (33.091 mi)
- Existed: 28 December 2003–present

Major junctions
- Northeast end: West 4th Ring Road in Erqi District, Zhengzhou, Henan
- G3001 in Erqi District, Zhengzhou; Henan S60 in Dengfeng, Zhengzhou; G1516 / Henan S49 in Dengfeng, Zhengzhou
- Southwest end: Dengfeng, Zhengzhou, Henan

Location
- Country: China
- Province: Henan

Highway system
- Transport in China

The Zhengzhou–Shaolinsi Expressway (Chinese: 郑州－少林寺高速公路), often referred to as Zhengshao Expressway (Chinese: 郑少高速) and designated as S85 in Henan's expressway system, is 53.254-kilometre (33.091 mi) long regional expressway in Henan, China.The Zhengzhou–Shaolinsi (Shaolin Monastery in Dengfeng) expressway was opened on 28 December 2003. On 12 February 2018, it was announced that the expressway would be free of charge to light passenger vehicles registered in Zhengzhou (the initial characters on licence plates are 豫A) from 22 February 2018. After 1 May 2018, this policy is only applicable to eligible vehicles equipped with ETC devices.

== Exits list ==
Location	km	mi	Exit	Name	Destinations	Notes
Henan S85 (Zhengzhou–Shaolinsi Expressway)
Continues east towards downtown Zhengzhou as Hanghai W. Road
Erqi District, Zhengzhou	0	0	0 A-B	West 4th Ring Rd.	West 4th Ring Road	Northeastern terminus
Erqi District, Zhengzhou	Zhengzhou Southwest Toll Station					
Erqi District, Zhengzhou			4	Zhengzhou Southwest Interchange	G3001 – Other destinations in Zhengzhou	
Xinmi, Zhengzhou	20.4	12.7	20	Xinmi	Mizhou Avenue – Xinmi	
Xinmi, Zhengzhou				North Xinmi	Kaiyang Road – Xinmi	
Xinmi, Zhengzhou	Xinmi Parking Area					
Xinmi, Zhengzhou	29.7	18.5	29	West Xinmi	Henan S232 – Xinmi	
Dengfeng, Zhengzhou	48.4	30.1	48	Tangzhuang	Henan S60 / Henan S237 – Xinzheng, Shangqiu, Tangzhuang, Ludian	
Dengfeng, Zhengzhou			50 A-B	G1516 / Henan S49 – Xuchang, Yongcheng, Gongyi, Jiaozuo		G1516 concurrency eastern terminus
Dengfeng, Zhengzhou	52.7	32.7	52	East Dengfeng	Henan S316 (Shaolin Avenue) – Dengfeng	
Dengfeng, Zhengzhou			61	West Dengfeng	G207 (Dengfeng Avenue) – Dengfeng, Mount Song, Shaolin Monastery, Songyue Pagoda	
Continues west towards Luoyang as G1516 (currently still designated as Henan S85)
Closed/former; Concurrency terminus; HOV only; Incomplete access; Tolled; Route transition; Unopened
