= Huilong Township, Henan =

Huilong Township 回龙乡
- Township
- Location in Henan
- Coordinates: 32°37′10″N 113°43′20″E
- Country: People's Republic of China
- Province: Henan
- Prefecture-level city: Nanyang
- County: Tongbai
- Village-level divisions: 10 villages
- Elevation: 169 m (554 ft)
- Time zone: UTC+8 (China Standard)
- Area code: 0377

Huilong Township (simplified Chinese: 回龙乡; traditional Chinese: 回龍鄉; pinyin: Huílóng Xiāng) is a township of Tongbai County in southern Henan province, China, located near the trisection of the prefecture-level cities of Nanyang, Zhumadian, and Xinyang. It is situated 119 kilometres (74 mi) southeast of Nanyang, 48 km (30 mi) southwest of Zhumadian and 62 km (39 mi) northwest of Xinyang. As of 2011, it has 10 villages under its administration.

== See also ==
- List of township-level divisions of Henan
