= Shijing Subdistrict, Guangzhou =

Shijing Subdistrict 石井街道
- Subdistrict
- Interactive map of Shijing Subdistrict
- Coordinates: 23°12′23″N 113°13′33″E
- Country: People's Republic of China
- Province: Guangdong
- Sub-provincial city: Guangzhou
- District: Baiyun

Area
  - Total: 39.28 km^{2} (15.17 sq mi)

Population
  - Total: 150,000
  - Density: 3,800/km^{2} (9,900/sq mi)
- Time zone: UTC+8 (China Standard Time)

Shijing Subdistrict (Chinese: 石井街道; pinyin: Shíjǐng Jiēdào; Jyutping: sek^{6}zeng^{2} gaai^{1}dou^{6}) is a subdistrict of Baiyun District, Guangzhou, People's Republic of China. It has a total population of 150,000, 84,000 of whom are long-term residents, residing in an area of 39.28 km^{2} (15.17 sq mi).

== See also ==
- List of township-level divisions of Guangdong
