= Xixia County =

Xixia County 西峡县
- County
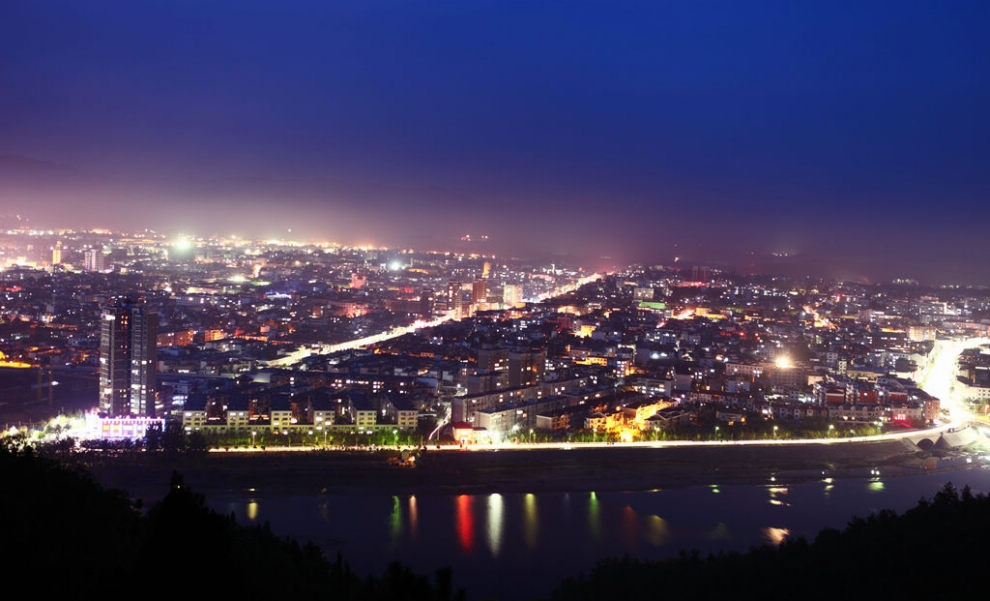
- Xixia night view

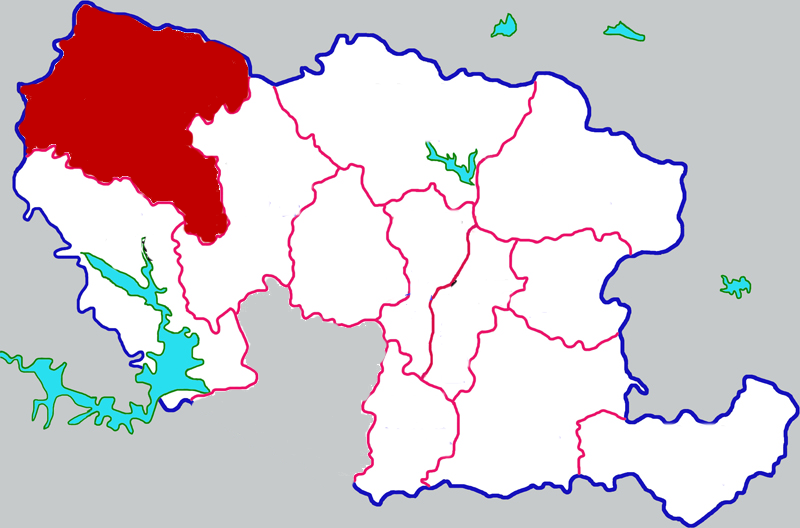
- Xixia in Nanyang

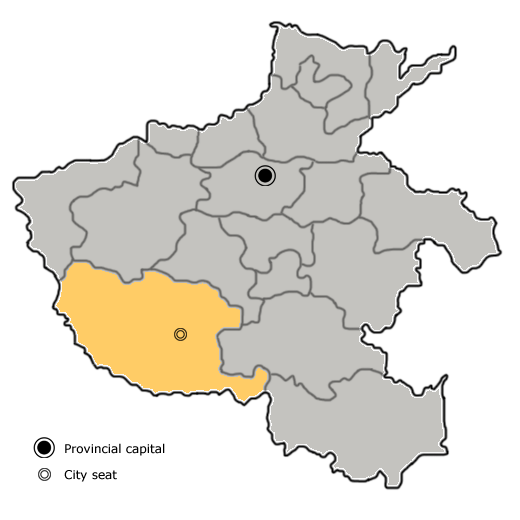
- Nanyang in Henan (note the map includes the sub-prefectural city of Dengzhou)
- Coordinates: 33°18′25″N 111°28′26″E
- Country: People's Republic of China
- Province: Henan
- Prefecture-level city: Nanyang

Area
  - Total: 3,453 km^{2} (1,333 sq mi)

Population (2019)
  - Total: 431,800
  - Density: 125.1/km^{2} (323.9/sq mi)
- Time zone: UTC+8 (China Standard)
- Postal code: 474550
- Area code: 0377
- Website: www.xixia.gov.cn

Xixia County (simplified Chinese: 西峡; traditional Chinese: 西峽; pinyin: Xīxiá; postal: Sisia) is a county in the southwest of Henan province, China, bordering Shaanxi province to the west. It is under the administration of the prefecture-level city of Nanyang, and has an area of 3,452 km^{2} (1,333 sq mi) and a population of 420,000 as of 2002.

== History ==
The region has a relatively long history. 6000 years ago, there were human settlements within the territory, and throughout history, it was mostly an important county town. In December 1949, Xixia was rebuilt as a county.

== Geography ==
Secondly, the location is relatively unique. Xixia County is located at the boundary between the warm temperate zone and the northern subtropical zone, and the boundary between the humid and semi humid areas.

== Economy ==
It is a transportation hub in adjacent areas. There are relatively abundant resources. There are mainly five types of resources: forest, medicine, mining, water, and tourism.

== Administrative divisions ==
As of 2012, this county is divided to 3 subdistricts, 10 towns and 6 townships.

Subdistricts

- Baiyu Subdistrict (白羽街道)
- Zijin Subdistrict (紫金街道)
- Lianhua Subdistrict (莲花街道)

Towns

- Danshui (丹水镇)
- Xiping (西坪镇)
- Shuanglong (双龙镇)
- Huiche (回车镇)
- Dinghe (丁河镇)
- Sangping (桑坪镇)
- Miping (米坪镇)
- Wuliqiao (五里桥镇)
- Taiping (太平镇)
- Chongyang (重阳镇)

Townships

- Tianguan Township (田关乡)
- Yangcheng Township (阳城乡)
- Zhaigen Township (寨根乡)
- Shijiehe Township (石界河乡)
- Junmahe Township (军马河乡)
- Erlangping Township (二郎坪乡)

== Climate ==
Climate data for Xixia, elevation 250 m (820 ft), (1991–2020 normals, extremes 1981–present)
Month	Jan	Feb	Mar	Apr	May	Jun	Jul	Aug	Sep	Oct	Nov	Dec	Year
Record high °C (°F)	21.3 (70.3)	23.8 (74.8)	34.6 (94.3)	35.7 (96.3)	39.5 (103.1)	41.2 (106.2)	40.5 (104.9)	38.2 (100.8)	39.1 (102.4)	35.1 (95.2)	29.5 (85.1)	22.5 (72.5)	41.2 (106.2)
Mean daily maximum °C (°F)	8.1 (46.6)	11.3 (52.3)	16.5 (61.7)	23.0 (73.4)	27.7 (81.9)	31.3 (88.3)	32.1 (89.8)	31.1 (88.0)	27.0 (80.6)	22.1 (71.8)	16.0 (60.8)	10.3 (50.5)	21.4 (70.5)
Daily mean °C (°F)	2.7 (36.9)	5.5 (41.9)	10.5 (50.9)	16.4 (61.5)	21.3 (70.3)	25.3 (77.5)	27.1 (80.8)	26.0 (78.8)	21.5 (70.7)	16.2 (61.2)	10.1 (50.2)	4.6 (40.3)	15.6 (60.1)
Mean daily minimum °C (°F)	−1.2 (29.8)	1.4 (34.5)	6.0 (42.8)	11.4 (52.5)	16.2 (61.2)	20.6 (69.1)	23.4 (74.1)	22.4 (72.3)	17.9 (64.2)	12.3 (54.1)	6.2 (43.2)	0.8 (33.4)	11.5 (52.6)
Record low °C (°F)	−8.9 (16.0)	−9.7 (14.5)	−4.2 (24.4)	−0.1 (31.8)	4.3 (39.7)	12.7 (54.9)	16.6 (61.9)	15.4 (59.7)	8.1 (46.6)	0.6 (33.1)	−4.3 (24.3)	−11.5 (11.3)	−11.5 (11.3)
Average precipitation mm (inches)	15.6 (0.61)	15.3 (0.60)	34.9 (1.37)	51.6 (2.03)	79.2 (3.12)	96.9 (3.81)	184.7 (7.27)	138.7 (5.46)	101.3 (3.99)	60.9 (2.40)	31.0 (1.22)	11.1 (0.44)	821.2 (32.32)
Average precipitation days (≥ 0.1 mm)	5.2	5.7	7.9	8.5	9.8	9.5	13.5	12.5	11.3	9.5	7.1	5.1	105.6
Average snowy days	5.1	3.5	1.0	0	0	0	0	0	0	0	0.8	2.4	12.8
Average relative humidity (%)	63	63	63	65	64	67	77	78	76	71	68	62	68
Mean monthly sunshine hours	128.9	121.6	158.5	190.5	195.1	193.8	188.5	187.5	149.4	147.9	141.1	138.6	1,941.4
Percentage possible sunshine	41	39	42	49	45	45	43	46	41	43	46	45	44
Source: China Meteorological Administration

== Transportation ==
- Hushan Expressway
- China National Highway 209
- China National Highway 311
- China National Highway 312
- Henan Provincial Highway 335
- Yunxi Railway
- Ningxi Railway

== Specialty ==
Zhongjing Mushroom Sauce: Zhongjing mushroom sauce uses Xixia mushroom and is cooked using a unique process. The mushroom grains in Zhongjing mushroom sauce are distinct and the sauce aroma is rich. Both rice and noodles are very delicious. And there are many flavors of this mushroom sauce, including original, spicy, and Orleans flavors.

Xixia Kiwi is a specialty of Xixia County, Nanyang, and also a geographical indication product of China. Xixia is located at the junction of temperate and subtropical regions, and is the earliest area in China to carry out artificial cultivation of kiwifruit. The unique climate conditions make the macaques produced in Xixia excellent in quality, rich in taste, and high in vitamin C.
