= China National Highway 311 =

Road in China

National Highway 311
- 311国道

Route information
- Length: 748 km (465 mi)

Major junctions
- From: Xuzhou, Jiangsu
- To: Xixia County, Henan

Location
- Country: China

Highway system
- National Trunk Highway System; Primary; Auxiliary
← G310	→ G312

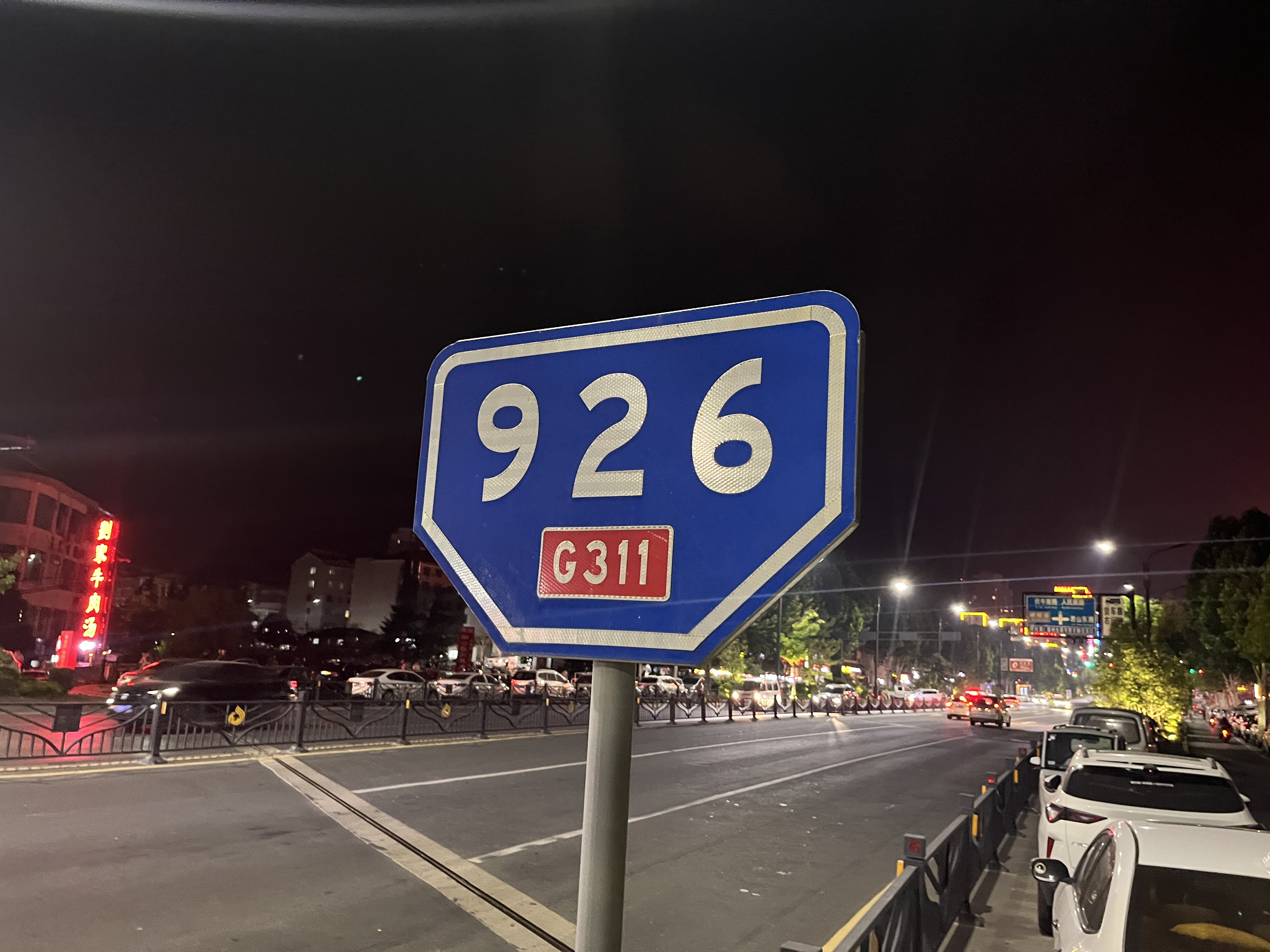
Kilometre marker in Luanchuan County, Henan

China National Highway 311 (G311) runs west from Xuzhou, Jiangsu towards Anhui province, and ends in Xixia County, Henan. It is 748 kilometres in length.

== Route and distance ==
Route and distance

City	Distance (km)
Xuzhou, Jiangsu	0
Xiao County, Anhui	27
Yongcheng, Henan	97
Bozhou, Anhui	155
Luyi, Henan	185
Taikang County, Henan	255
Fugou, Henan	307
Yanling, Henan	329
Xuchang, Henan	366
Xiangcheng County, Henan	406
Ye County, Henan	434
Lushan County, Henan	483
Shimudi, Henan	519
Xixia County, Henan	748

== See also ==
- China National Highways
