= Jianggao =

Jianggao 江高镇
- Town
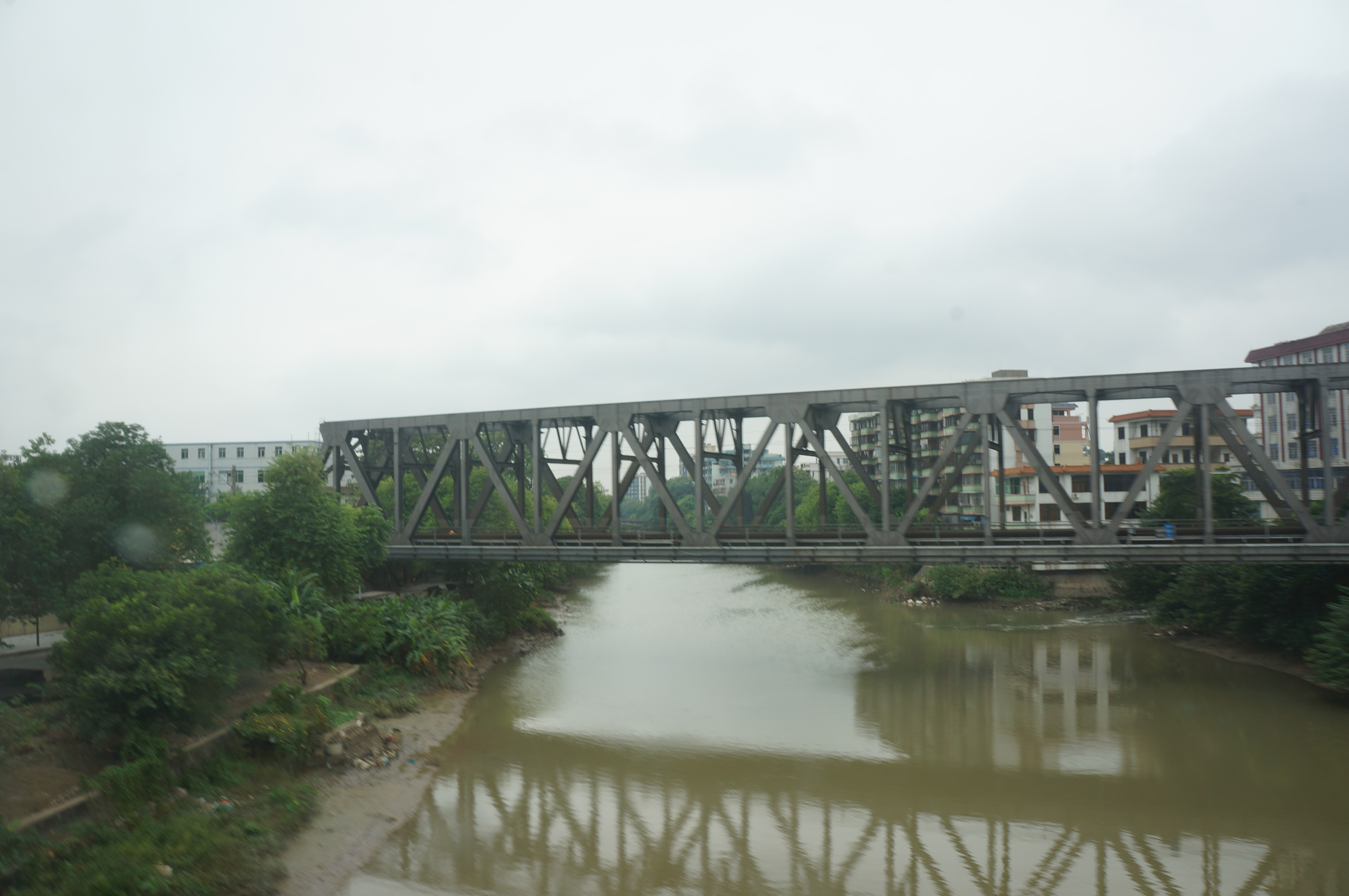
- Jiangcun Bridge

- Location in China
- Coordinates: 23°16′20″N 113°13′06″E
- Country: China
- Province: Guangdong
- Prefecture: Guangzhou
- District: Baiyun District

Area
  - Total: 95.71 km^{2} (36.95 sq mi)

Population (2010)
  - Total: 161,343
  - Density: 1,686/km^{2} (4,366/sq mi)

Jianggao (Chinese: 江高镇; pinyin: Jiānggāo Zhèn) is a town in Baiyun District, Guangzhou, Guangdong, China.
