= Xincai County =

Xincai County 新蔡县 Sintsai
- County
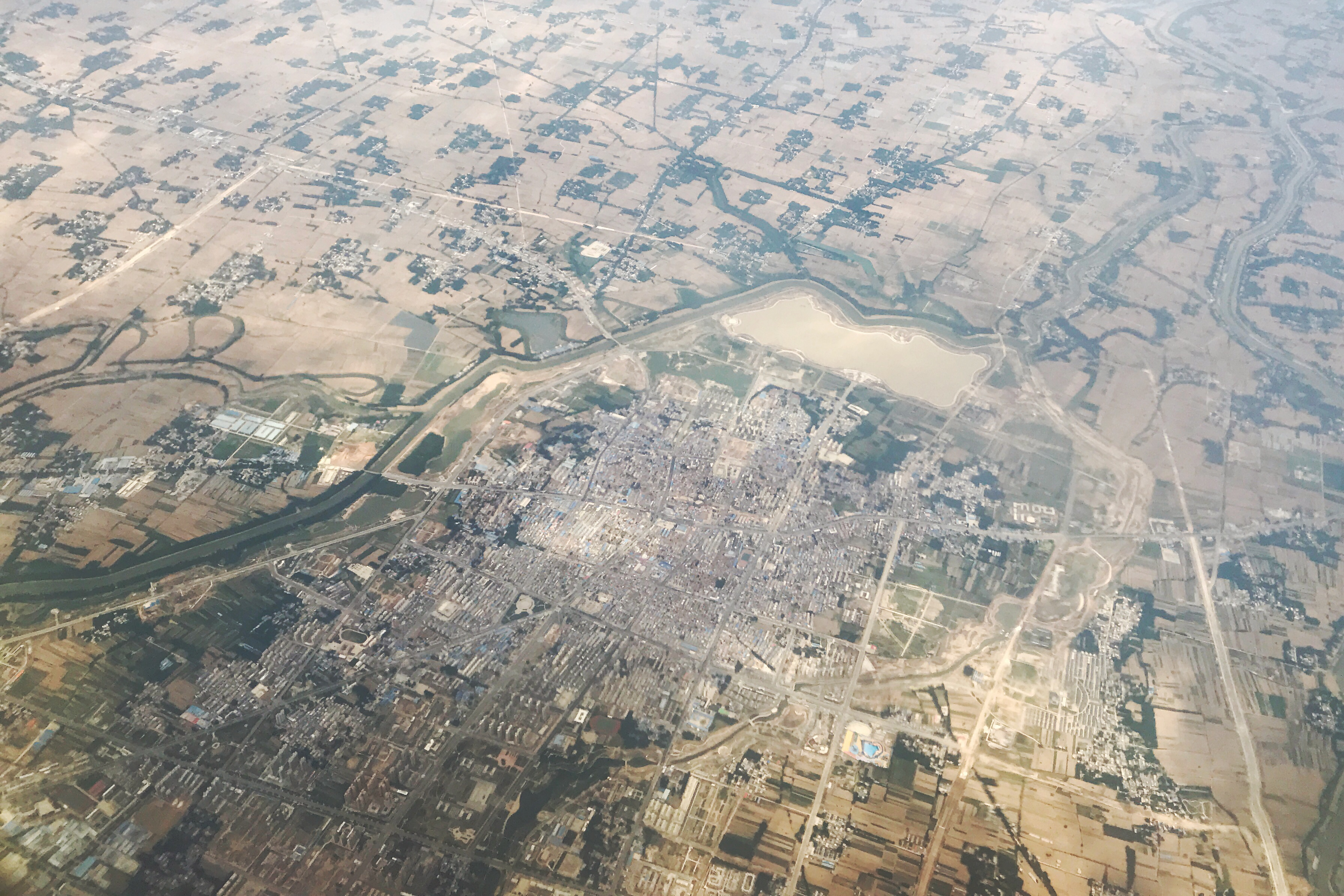

- Location of the seat in Henan
- Coordinates: 32°44′42″N 114°57′54″E
- Country: People's Republic of China
- Province: Henan
- Prefecture-level city: Zhumadian

Government
  - CPC County Party Secretary: Jia Guoyin (贾国印)
  - County Magistrate: Wang Jingfeng (王景峰)

Area
  - Total: 1,442 km^{2} (557 sq mi)

Population (2019)
  - Total: 846,400
  - Density: 587.0/km^{2} (1,520/sq mi)
- Time zone: UTC+8 (China Standard)
- Postal code: 463500
- Website: www.xincai.gov.cn

Xincai County (Chinese: 新蔡县; pinyin: Xīncài Xiàn; postal: Sintsai) is a county in the southeast of Henan province, China, bordering Anhui province to the northeast and east. It is the easternmost county-level division of the prefecture-level city of Zhumadian. Xincai was one of the early locations of the Cai state during the Spring and Autumn period.

== Administrative divisions ==
Xincai county administers three subdistricts, ten towns, one ethnic town and nine townships.

Name	Chinese (S)	Hanyu Pinyin
;Subdistricts		
Gulü Subdistrict	古吕街道	gǔ lǚ jiēdào
Jinshi Subdistrict	今是街道	jīn shì jiēdào
Yueliangwan Subdistrict	月亮湾街道	yuèliàng wān jiēdào
;Towns		
Zhuandian	砖店镇	zhuān diàn
Chendian	陈店镇	chén diàn
Fogesi	佛阁寺镇	fú gé sì
Liancun	练村镇	liàn cūn
Tangcun	棠村	táng cūn
Hanji	韩集镇	hán jí
Longkou	龙口镇	lóngkǒu
Huanglou	黄楼镇	huáng lóu
Sunzhao	孙召镇	sūn zhào
Yudian	孙召镇	yú diàn
;Ethnic towns		
Liqiao Hui Town	李桥回族镇	lǐ qiáo huízú zhèn
;Townships		
Hewu Township	河坞乡	hé wù xiāng
Guanjin Township	关津乡	guān jīn xiāng
Songgang Township	宋岗乡	sòng gǎng xiāng
Dungang Township	顿岗乡	dùn gǎng xiāng
Jiantou Township	涧头乡	jiàn tóu xiāng
Yangzhuanghu Township	杨庄户乡	yáng zhuānghù xiāng
Huazhuang Township	化庄乡	huà zhuāng xiāng
Licheng Township	栎城乡	lì chéng xiāng
Mituosi Township	弥陀寺乡	mítuó sì xiāng

== Climate ==
Climate data for Xincai, elevation 38 m (125 ft), (1991–2020 normals, extremes 1981–present)
Month	Jan	Feb	Mar	Apr	May	Jun	Jul	Aug	Sep	Oct	Nov	Dec	Year
Record high °C (°F)	21.1 (70.0)	26.5 (79.7)	33.8 (92.8)	32.5 (90.5)	37.3 (99.1)	40.9 (105.6)	41.4 (106.5)	38.3 (100.9)	39.1 (102.4)	39.2 (102.6)	28.4 (83.1)	21.4 (70.5)	41.4 (106.5)
Mean daily maximum °C (°F)	6.6 (43.9)	10.1 (50.2)	15.2 (59.4)	21.5 (70.7)	27.0 (80.6)	30.9 (87.6)	32.0 (89.6)	31.0 (87.8)	27.5 (81.5)	22.6 (72.7)	15.5 (59.9)	9.0 (48.2)	20.7 (69.3)
Daily mean °C (°F)	1.8 (35.2)	4.8 (40.6)	9.7 (49.5)	15.7 (60.3)	21.1 (70.0)	25.5 (77.9)	27.6 (81.7)	26.5 (79.7)	22.3 (72.1)	16.8 (62.2)	10.0 (50.0)	3.9 (39.0)	15.5 (59.9)
Mean daily minimum °C (°F)	−2.0 (28.4)	0.6 (33.1)	4.9 (40.8)	10.3 (50.5)	15.8 (60.4)	20.9 (69.6)	23.9 (75.0)	23.1 (73.6)	18.3 (64.9)	12.3 (54.1)	5.6 (42.1)	−0.1 (31.8)	11.1 (52.0)
Record low °C (°F)	−17.5 (0.5)	−13.3 (8.1)	−7.7 (18.1)	−0.9 (30.4)	4.0 (39.2)	11.8 (53.2)	17.6 (63.7)	14.3 (57.7)	7.5 (45.5)	0.8 (33.4)	−8.4 (16.9)	−17.2 (1.0)	−17.5 (0.5)
Average precipitation mm (inches)	24.9 (0.98)	31.8 (1.25)	52.5 (2.07)	61.9 (2.44)	98.5 (3.88)	161.4 (6.35)	185.5 (7.30)	143.6 (5.65)	78.9 (3.11)	58.6 (2.31)	44.3 (1.74)	20.9 (0.82)	962.8 (37.9)
Average precipitation days (≥ 0.1 mm)	6.1	7.3	8.0	8.2	9.7	9.4	11.8	11.4	8.7	7.9	7.4	5.4	101.3
Average snowy days	4.5	2.8	1.1	0	0	0	0	0	0	0	0.8	1.8	11
Average relative humidity (%)	71	71	71	73	73	73	81	83	78	72	71	70	74
Mean monthly sunshine hours	110.1	116.0	150.4	180.6	179.9	170.5	183.7	169.5	145.9	144.3	135.7	124.6	1,811.2
Percentage possible sunshine	34	37	40	46	42	40	42	41	40	41	44	40	41
Source: China Meteorological Administration
