= Queshan County =

Queshan County 确山县
- County
- Location of the seat in Henan
- Coordinates: 32°49′16″N 114°01′01″E
- Country: People's Republic of China
- Province: Henan
- Prefecture-level city: Zhumadian

Area
  - Total: 1,667 km^{2} (644 sq mi)

Population (2019)
  - Total: 403,600
  - Density: 242.1/km^{2} (627.1/sq mi)
- Time zone: UTC+8 (China Standard)
- Postal code: 463200

Queshan County (simplified Chinese: 确山县; traditional Chinese: 確山縣; pinyin: Quèshān Xiàn) is a county under the prefecture-level city of Zhumadian, Henan Province, China.

== Administrative divisions ==
As of 2017, this county is divided to 3 subdistricts and 10 towns.

Subdistricts

- Panlong Subdistrict (盘龙街道)
- Sanlihe Subdistrict (三里河街道)
- Langling Subdistrict (朗陵街道)

Towns

- Zhugou (竹沟镇)
- Rendian (任店镇)
- Xin’andian (新安店镇)
- Liuzhuang (留庄镇)
- Liudian (刘店镇)
- Wagang (瓦岗镇)
- Shuanghe (双河镇)
- Shijiaohe (石角河镇)
- Lixindian (李新店镇)
- Puhuisi (普会寺乡)

Former Towns and Townships

- Yifeng (蚁蜂镇)
- Shigunhe Township (石滚河乡)
- Wagang Township (瓦岗乡)

== Climate ==
Climate data for Queshan, elevation 114 m (374 ft), (1991–2020 normals, extremes 1981–present)
| Month | Jan | Feb | Mar | Apr | May | Jun | Jul | Aug | Sep | Oct | Nov | Dec | Year |
|---|---|---|---|---|---|---|---|---|---|---|---|---|---|
| Record high °C (°F) | 21.4 (70.5) | 25.7 (78.3) | 35.2 (95.4) | 35.1 (95.2) | 37.5 (99.5) | 39.8 (103.6) | 40.1 (104.2) | 40.1 (104.2) | 38.7 (101.7) | 34.5 (94.1) | 28.6 (83.5) | 21.9 (71.4) | 40.1 (104.2) |
| Mean daily maximum °C (°F) | 6.3 (43.3) | 9.7 (49.5) | 16.2 (61.2) | 22.3 (72.1) | 27.7 (81.9) | 31.3 (88.3) | 31.8 (89.2) | 31.0 (87.8) | 26.8 (80.2) | 22.3 (72.1) | 15.4 (59.7) | 9.1 (48.4) | 20.8 (69.5) |
| Daily mean °C (°F) | 1.5 (34.7) | 4.5 (40.1) | 10.5 (50.9) | 16.3 (61.3) | 21.8 (71.2) | 25.9 (78.6) | 27.3 (81.1) | 26.4 (79.5) | 21.7 (71.1) | 16.7 (62.1) | 10.1 (50.2) | 3.9 (39.0) | 15.5 (60.0) |
| Mean daily minimum °C (°F) | −2.2 (28.0) | 0.5 (32.9) | 5.6 (42.1) | 10.8 (51.4) | 16.6 (61.9) | 21.1 (70.0) | 23.8 (74.8) | 22.9 (73.2) | 18.0 (64.4) | 12.6 (54.7) | 6.1 (43.0) | 0.1 (32.2) | 11.3 (52.4) |
| Record low °C (°F) | −12.3 (9.9) | −11.6 (11.1) | −5.2 (22.6) | −0.1 (31.8) | 6.1 (43.0) | 12.4 (54.3) | 17.6 (63.7) | 14.8 (58.6) | 9.3 (48.7) | 2.1 (35.8) | −6.1 (21.0) | −12.0 (10.4) | −12.3 (9.9) |
| Average precipitation mm (inches) | 26.1 (1.03) | 28.3 (1.11) | 48.9 (1.93) | 66.3 (2.61) | 91.8 (3.61) | 142.1 (5.59) | 190.8 (7.51) | 139.9 (5.51) | 88.4 (3.48) | 60.6 (2.39) | 44.9 (1.77) | 20.4 (0.80) | 948.5 (37.34) |
| Average precipitation days (≥ 0.1 mm) | 6.1 | 6.8 | 7.6 | 7.7 | 9.7 | 8.6 | 11.6 | 11.1 | 9.3 | 8.0 | 7.3 | 5.4 | 99.2 |
| Average snowy days | 4.6 | 3.2 | 1.1 | 0.1 | 0 | 0 | 0 | 0 | 0 | 0 | 0.9 | 2.3 | 12.2 |
| Average relative humidity (%) | 68 | 68 | 68 | 68 | 67 | 69 | 78 | 81 | 75 | 69 | 69 | 66 | 71 |
| Mean monthly sunshine hours | 126.7 | 127.5 | 159.5 | 184.8 | 191.9 | 178.3 | 184.5 | 167.2 | 147.8 | 149.6 | 140.8 | 136.8 | 1,895.4 |
| Percentage possible sunshine | 40 | 41 | 43 | 47 | 45 | 42 | 43 | 41 | 40 | 43 | 45 | 44 | 43 |
Source: China Meteorological Administration
