= Xiangcheng County, Henan =

Coordinates: 33°50′49″N 113°29′02″E

Xiangcheng County 襄城县
- County
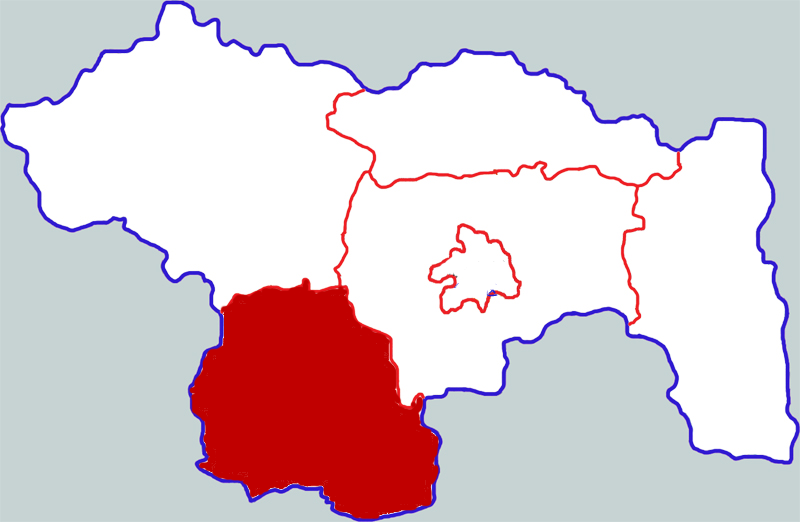
- Xiangcheng in Xuchang

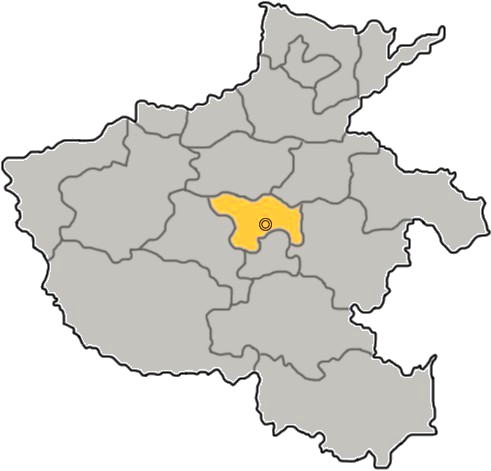
- Xuchang in Henan
- Country: People's Republic of China
- Province: Henan
- Prefecture-level city: Xuchang

Area
  - Total: 920 km^{2} (360 sq mi)

Population (2019)
  - Total: 695,500
  - Density: 760/km^{2} (2,000/sq mi)
- Time zone: UTC+8 (China Standard)
- Postal code: 461700

Xiangcheng County (Chinese: 襄城县; pinyin: Xiāngchéng Xiàn) is a county in the central part of Henan province, China. It is located in the southwest of the prefecture-level city of Xuchang, and is its southernmost county-level division.

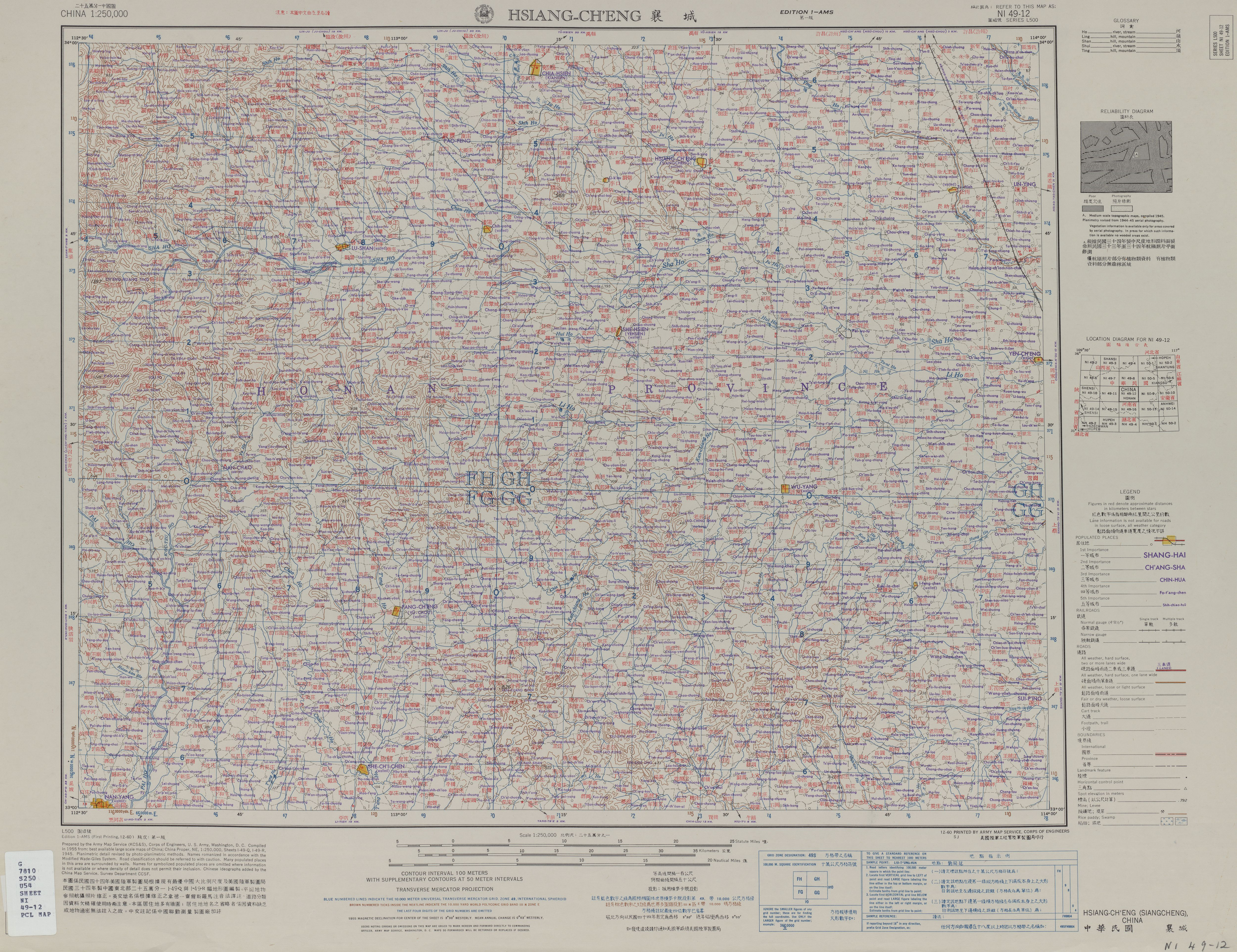
Map including Xiangcheng (labeled as HSIANG-CH'ENG (SIANGCHENG) (walled) 襄城) (AMS, 1955)

== Administrative divisions ==
As of 2012, this county is divided to 6 towns, 1 ethnic town and 9 townships.

Towns

- Chengguan (城关镇)
- Mailing (麦岭镇)
- Yingyang (颍阳镇)
- Wangluo (王洛镇)
- Ziyun (紫云镇) - Formerly Suncitang Township
- Kuzhuang (库庄镇)

Ethnic towns

- Yingqiao Hui Town (颍桥回族镇)

Townships

- Zhanbei Township (湛北乡)
- Shantoudian Township (山头店乡)
- Cigou Township (茨沟乡)
- Dingying Township (丁营乡)
- Jiangzhuang Township (姜庄乡)
- Fanhu Township (范湖乡)
- Shuangmiao Township (双庙乡)
- Fenchen Township (汾陈乡)
- Shilipu Township (十里铺乡)

== Climate ==
Climate data for Xiangcheng, elevation 80 m (260 ft), (1991–2020 normals, extremes 1981–present)
Month	Jan	Feb	Mar	Apr	May	Jun	Jul	Aug	Sep	Oct	Nov	Dec	Year
Record high °C (°F)	20.6 (69.1)	24.5 (76.1)	32.8 (91.0)	35.0 (95.0)	41.2 (106.2)	40.6 (105.1)	41.0 (105.8)	39.4 (102.9)	37.2 (99.0)	34.8 (94.6)	27.9 (82.2)	21.7 (71.1)	41.2 (106.2)
Mean daily maximum °C (°F)	6.6 (43.9)	10.3 (50.5)	15.7 (60.3)	22.1 (71.8)	27.7 (81.9)	32.3 (90.1)	32.4 (90.3)	30.8 (87.4)	27.2 (81.0)	22.2 (72.0)	14.9 (58.8)	8.8 (47.8)	20.9 (69.6)
Daily mean °C (°F)	1.2 (34.2)	4.3 (39.7)	9.7 (49.5)	16.0 (60.8)	21.6 (70.9)	26.4 (79.5)	27.6 (81.7)	26.0 (78.8)	21.5 (70.7)	16.0 (60.8)	9.1 (48.4)	3.3 (37.9)	15.2 (59.4)
Mean daily minimum °C (°F)	−3.3 (26.1)	−0.6 (30.9)	4.4 (39.9)	10.1 (50.2)	15.7 (60.3)	20.7 (69.3)	23.5 (74.3)	22.3 (72.1)	17.0 (62.6)	11.0 (51.8)	4.2 (39.6)	−1.1 (30.0)	10.3 (50.6)
Record low °C (°F)	−14.7 (5.5)	−19.5 (−3.1)	−9.3 (15.3)	−2.3 (27.9)	4.4 (39.9)	11.8 (53.2)	16.3 (61.3)	12.5 (54.5)	6.4 (43.5)	−0.4 (31.3)	−10.1 (13.8)	−10.4 (13.3)	−19.5 (−3.1)
Average precipitation mm (inches)	14.7 (0.58)	16.2 (0.64)	28.3 (1.11)	43.3 (1.70)	66.8 (2.63)	91.1 (3.59)	173.0 (6.81)	117.4 (4.62)	84.5 (3.33)	45.2 (1.78)	34.5 (1.36)	12.3 (0.48)	727.3 (28.63)
Average precipitation days (≥ 0.1 mm)	4.3	4.9	6.2	6.3	7.8	8.1	11.1	10.4	9.1	6.8	6.0	4.2	85.2
Average snowy days	3.7	3.0	1.2	0.2	0	0	0	0	0	0	1.1	2.5	11.7
Average relative humidity (%)	61	65	61	65	64	65	77	81	79	72	69	59	68
Mean monthly sunshine hours	115.7	127.0	166.2	195.2	204.4	190.7	183.5	174.1	150.0	147.5	133.0	125.9	1,913.2
Percentage possible sunshine	37	41	44	50	47	44	42	42	41	43	43	41	43
Source: China Meteorological Administration
