= Tongbai County =

Tongbai County 桐柏县
- County
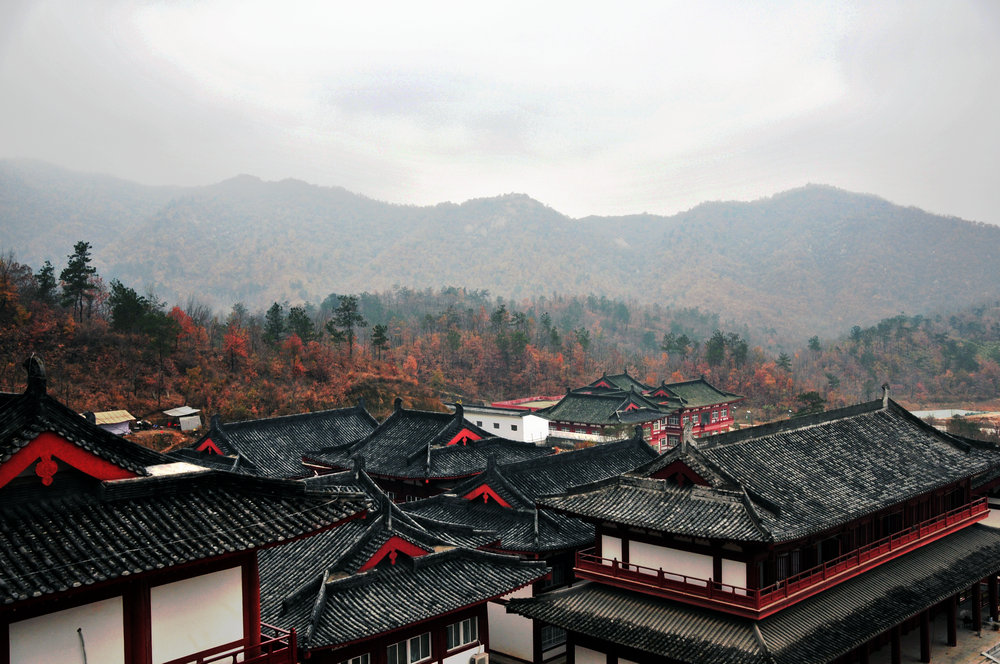

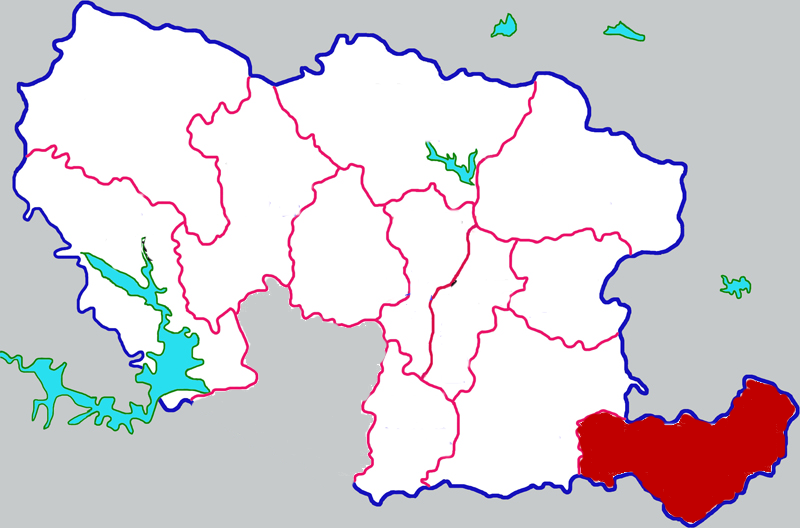
- Tongbai in Nanyang

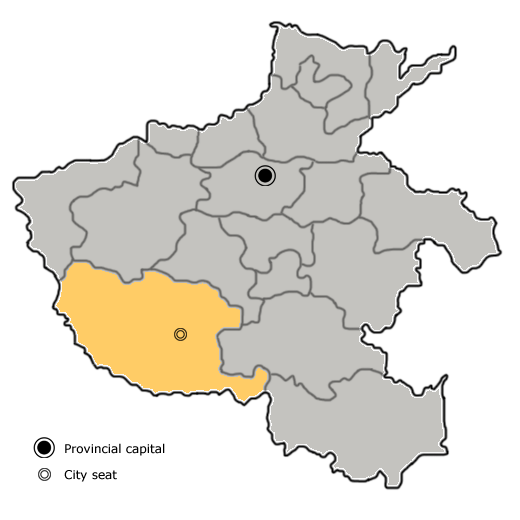
- Nanyang in Henan (note the map includes the sub-prefectural city of Dengzhou)
- Coordinates: 32°22′48″N 113°25′41″E
- Country: People's Republic of China
- Province: Henan
- Prefecture-level city: Nanyang

Area
  - Total: 1,941 km^{2} (749 sq mi)

Population (2019)
  - Total: 404,900
  - Density: 208.6/km^{2} (540.3/sq mi)
- Time zone: UTC+8 (China Standard)
- Postal code: 474750
- Area code: 0377

Tongbai County (Chinese: 桐柏县; pinyin: Tóngbǎi Xiàn) is a county in the south of Henan province, China, bordering Hubei province to the south. The easternmost county-level division of the prefecture-level city of Nanyang, it has an area of 1,941 square kilometres (749 mi^{2}) and a population of 420,000.

== Administrative divisions ==
As of 2012, this county is divided to 9 towns and 7 townships.

Towns

- Chengguan (城关镇)
- Yuehe (月河镇)
- Wucheng (吴城镇)
- Guxian (固县镇)
- Maoji (毛集镇)
- Dahe (大河镇)
- Bujiang (埠江镇)
- Pingshi (平氏镇)
- Huaiyuan (淮源镇)

Townships

- Chengjiao Township (城郊乡)
- Huilong Township (回龙乡)
- Huanggang Township (黄岗乡)
- Zhuzhuang Township (朱庄乡)
- Anpeng Township (安棚乡)
- Chengwan Township (程湾乡)
- Xinji Township (新集乡)

== Climate ==
Climate data for Tongbai, elevation 184 m (604 ft), (1991–2020 normals, extremes 1981–present)
Month	Jan	Feb	Mar	Apr	May	Jun	Jul	Aug	Sep	Oct	Nov	Dec	Year
Record high °C (°F)	21.1 (70.0)	26.3 (79.3)	35.7 (96.3)	34.7 (94.5)	36.7 (98.1)	37.3 (99.1)	39.6 (103.3)	38.0 (100.4)	38.6 (101.5)	34.1 (93.4)	28.9 (84.0)	21.5 (70.7)	39.6 (103.3)
Mean daily maximum °C (°F)	7.3 (45.1)	10.6 (51.1)	16.0 (60.8)	22.5 (72.5)	26.9 (80.4)	30.2 (86.4)	31.7 (89.1)	30.8 (87.4)	26.8 (80.2)	22.0 (71.6)	15.7 (60.3)	9.7 (49.5)	20.8 (69.5)
Daily mean °C (°F)	1.9 (35.4)	5.0 (41.0)	10.4 (50.7)	16.7 (62.1)	21.6 (70.9)	25.3 (77.5)	27.5 (81.5)	26.3 (79.3)	21.6 (70.9)	16.0 (60.8)	9.8 (49.6)	4.1 (39.4)	15.5 (59.9)
Mean daily minimum °C (°F)	−2.0 (28.4)	0.6 (33.1)	5.7 (42.3)	11.5 (52.7)	16.8 (62.2)	21.1 (70.0)	24.0 (75.2)	22.9 (73.2)	17.8 (64.0)	11.7 (53.1)	5.4 (41.7)	−0.1 (31.8)	11.3 (52.3)
Record low °C (°F)	−14.7 (5.5)	−12.8 (9.0)	−7.9 (17.8)	−0.2 (31.6)	5.2 (41.4)	12.1 (53.8)	17.5 (63.5)	13.2 (55.8)	8.7 (47.7)	−0.7 (30.7)	−5.5 (22.1)	−16.8 (1.8)	−16.8 (1.8)
Average precipitation mm (inches)	30.4 (1.20)	34.6 (1.36)	53.5 (2.11)	70.7 (2.78)	99.9 (3.93)	178.4 (7.02)	216.6 (8.53)	158.4 (6.24)	105.2 (4.14)	73.0 (2.87)	47.2 (1.86)	22.6 (0.89)	1,090.5 (42.93)
Average precipitation days (≥ 0.1 mm)	6.6	8.0	9.3	8.9	11.0	10.4	13.1	12.8	10.3	9.5	7.9	6.2	114
Average snowy days	5.3	4.0	1.5	0.1	0	0	0	0	0	0	1.0	2.8	14.7
Average relative humidity (%)	71	70	67	67	68	74	79	81	79	76	73	69	73
Mean monthly sunshine hours	120.2	120.8	153.2	178.8	185.0	175.8	184.3	171.3	144.0	147.7	136.1	132.4	1,849.6
Percentage possible sunshine	38	38	41	46	43	41	43	42	39	42	44	43	42
Source: China Meteorological Administration

== Transport ==
- China National Highway 312
