= Yongcheng =

Yongcheng 永城市 Yungcheng
- County-level & Sub-prefectural city
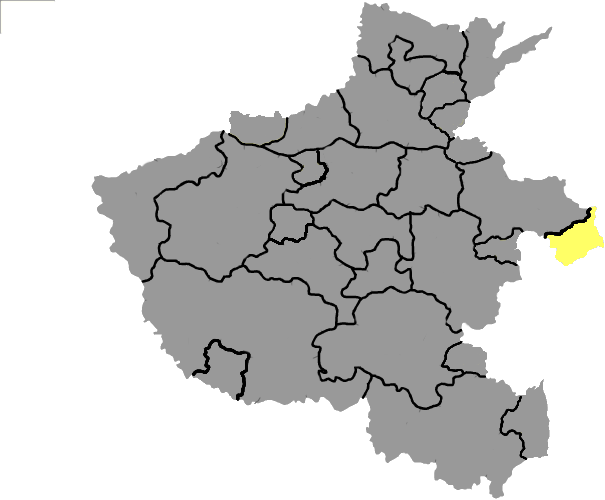
- Location in Henan

- Location in Henan
- Coordinates: 33°55′48″N 116°27′00″E
- Country: People's Republic of China
- Province: Henan
- Prefecture-level city: Shangqiu

Area
  - Total: 2,068 km^{2} (798 sq mi)

Population (2019)
  - Total: 1,241,500
- Time zone: UTC+8 (China Standard)
- Postal code: 476600
- Area code: 0370
- Website: http://www.ycs.gov.cn/

Yongcheng (Chinese: 永城; pinyin: Yǒngchéng) is county-level city in Henan province, China, and is the easternmost county-level division of the province, bordering Anhui province on all sides except the northwest and due north. Yongcheng has significant coal deposits and some insignificant magnet deposits. In 2014, Yongcheng was upgraded to a provincially directly administered city.

It is the former site of Shiyuan (柿园), the capital of Han-era Liang. It includes the excavated mausoleum of the fabulously wealthy Liu Wu, prince of Liang, now a museum (柿园汉墓) famed for its murals.

In 2015, thousands of students in Yongcheng 3rd High School (永城三高) led a riot expressing dissatisfaction following the assault of an elderly woman by school staff. They damaged school property and police vehicles before the situation was de-escalated through mediation.

== Geography ==
Yongcheng is located in the Huai River Basin, in the easternmost part of Henan Province, with an average elevation of 33 meters. The Tuo hui River passes through the northern part of the western urban area and the southern part of the eastern urban area. The Mang Mountain is located in the northern Mangshan Town. The China National Highway 311 runs through the east and west, and the S32 Yongcheng–Dengfeng Expressway runs through the south.

== Administrative divisions ==
As of 2012, this city is divided to 11 towns and 18 townships.

Towns

- Yanji (演集镇)
- Chengguan (城关镇)
- Mangshan (芒山镇)
- Gaozhuang (高庄镇)
- Zancheng (酂城镇)
- Peiqiao (裴桥镇)
- Maqiao (马桥镇)
- Xuehu (薛湖镇)
- Huangkou Town (黄口镇)
- Jiangkou (蒋口镇)
- Chenji (陈集镇)
- Shibali (十八里镇)

Townships

- Chengxiang Township (城厢乡)
- Houling Township (候岭乡)
- Xinqiao Township (新桥乡)
- Shuangqiao Township (双桥乡)
- Wangji Township (王集乡)
- Lizhai Township (李寨乡)
- Wolong Township (卧龙乡)
- Longgang Township (龙岗乡)
- Mamu Township (马牧乡)
- Zanyang Township (酂阳乡)
- Taiqiu Township (太丘乡)
- Shunhe Township (顺和乡)
- Tiaohe Township (条河乡)
- Liuhe Township (刘河乡)
- Chenguanzhuang Township (陈官庄乡)
- Miaoqiao Township (苗桥乡)
- Huicun Township (茴村乡)

== Climate ==
Climate data for Yongcheng, elevation 32 m (105 ft), (1991–2020 normals, extremes 1981–present)
Month	Jan	Feb	Mar	Apr	May	Jun	Jul	Aug	Sep	Oct	Nov	Dec	Year
Record high °C (°F)	18.4 (65.1)	26.1 (79.0)	32.4 (90.3)	32.9 (91.2)	38.4 (101.1)	40.5 (104.9)	41.0 (105.8)	37.9 (100.2)	36.9 (98.4)	35.5 (95.9)	28.2 (82.8)	21.6 (70.9)	41.0 (105.8)
Mean daily maximum °C (°F)	6.1 (43.0)	9.6 (49.3)	14.9 (58.8)	21.3 (70.3)	26.9 (80.4)	31.8 (89.2)	32.3 (90.1)	30.9 (87.6)	27.6 (81.7)	22.5 (72.5)	14.8 (58.6)	8.2 (46.8)	20.6 (69.0)
Daily mean °C (°F)	1.0 (33.8)	4.0 (39.2)	9.1 (48.4)	15.3 (59.5)	20.9 (69.6)	25.8 (78.4)	27.7 (81.9)	26.5 (79.7)	22.1 (71.8)	16.5 (61.7)	9.2 (48.6)	2.9 (37.2)	15.1 (59.2)
Mean daily minimum °C (°F)	−2.9 (26.8)	−0.4 (31.3)	4.2 (39.6)	9.7 (49.5)	15.3 (59.5)	20.5 (68.9)	23.9 (75.0)	23.0 (73.4)	17.7 (63.9)	11.6 (52.9)	4.7 (40.5)	−1.1 (30.0)	10.5 (50.9)
Record low °C (°F)	−16.3 (2.7)	−19.1 (−2.4)	−11.1 (12.0)	−4.5 (23.9)	2.7 (36.9)	10.0 (50.0)	16.7 (62.1)	13.8 (56.8)	5.5 (41.9)	−1.9 (28.6)	−9.8 (14.4)	−21.9 (−7.4)	−21.9 (−7.4)
Average precipitation mm (inches)	17.6 (0.69)	20.5 (0.81)	35.3 (1.39)	41.4 (1.63)	72.0 (2.83)	104.2 (4.10)	208.3 (8.20)	142.7 (5.62)	63.9 (2.52)	43.4 (1.71)	31.7 (1.25)	16.3 (0.64)	797.3 (31.39)
Average precipitation days (≥ 0.1 mm)	4.8	5.5	5.9	7.0	7.4	7.8	11.9	11.6	8.5	5.9	6.3	4.8	87.4
Average snowy days	3.4	2.9	1.1	0	0	0	0	0	0	0	0.7	1.6	9.7
Average relative humidity (%)	68	65	66	68	69	66	79	83	77	69	70	68	71
Mean monthly sunshine hours	119.1	127.6	160.9	189.2	198.3	177.2	170.2	170.6	160.9	156.2	134.2	127.5	1,891.9
Percentage possible sunshine	38	41	43	48	46	41	39	42	44	45	43	42	43
Source: China Meteorological Administration
