= G1516 Yancheng–Luoyang Expressway =

Road in China

Yancheng–Luoyang Expressway
- 盐城－洛阳高速公路
- Yanluo Expressway 盐洛高速公路

Route information
- Auxiliary route of G15

Major junctions
- West end: G36 / G55 in Yichuan County, Luoyang, Henan
- East end: G228 in Dafeng District, Yancheng, Jiangsu

Location
- Country: China

Highway system
- National Trunk Highway System; Primary; Auxiliary; National Highways; Transport in China
← G1515	→ G1517

The G1516 Yancheng–Luoyang Expressway (Chinese: 盐城—洛阳高速公路), also referred to as the Yanluo Expressway (Chinese: 盐洛高速公路), is an expressway in China that connects Yancheng, Jiangsu to Luoyang, Henan.

== Route ==
=== Jiangsu ===
==== Yanhuai Expressway ====
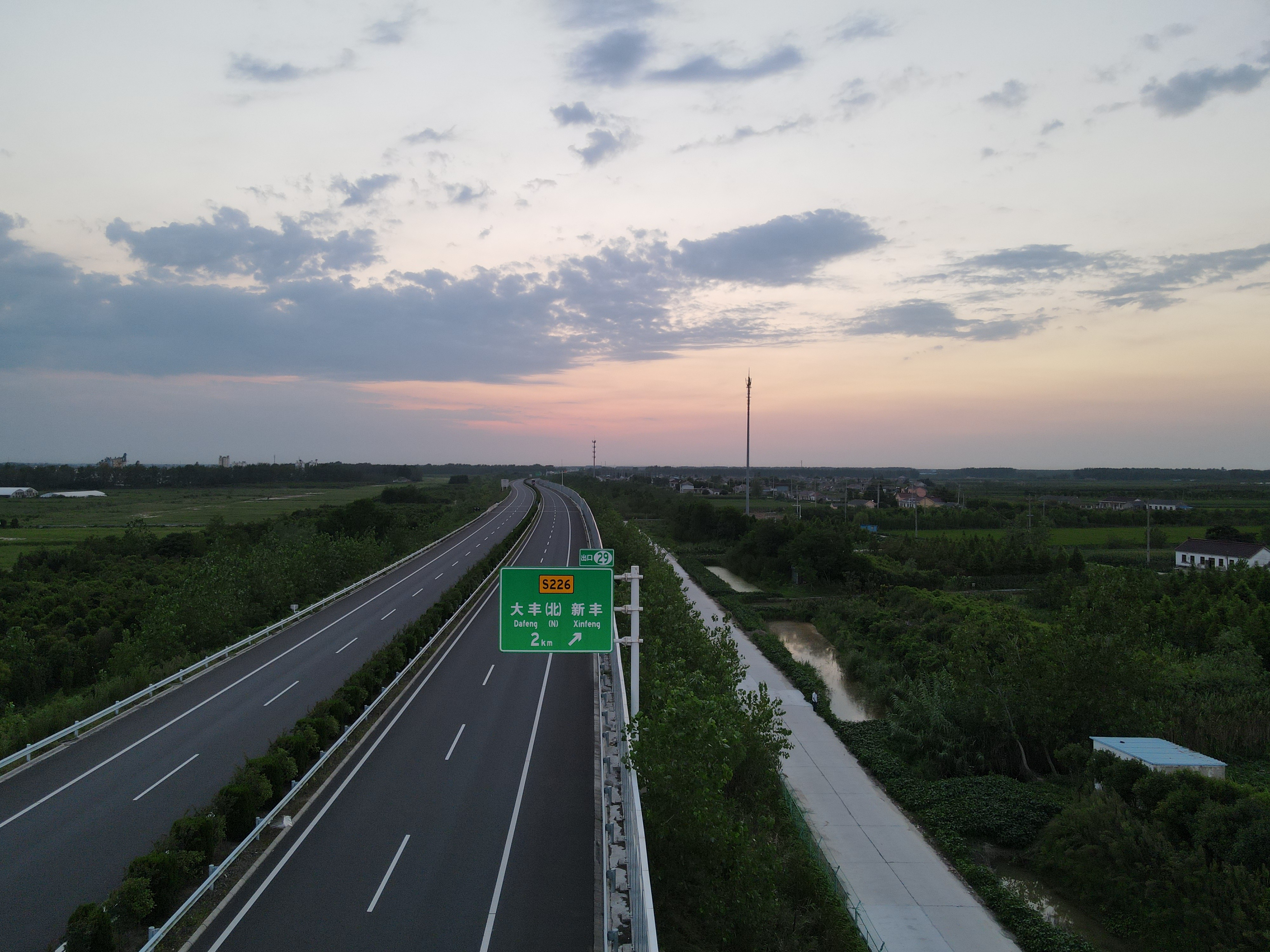
Yanluo Expressway in Dafeng District

The Yanhuai Expressway, also known as Huaiyan Expressway, is an expressway from Dafeng Port to Huai'an. The original provincial expressway number is S18 and is now part of the Yanluo Expressway. The section from Yancheng to Huai'an has a total length of 104 kilometers and started construction on 28 August 2002 and was opened to traffic on 2 November 2006. The section from Yancheng to Dafeng Port is 36.63 kilometers long and was opened to traffic on 26 October 2016.

==== Suhuai Expressway ====
The Suhuai Expressway is an expressway in Jiangsu and runs concurrently with the G25 and G2513 expressways. The total length is 109 kilometers and was opened to traffic on 1 December 2005.

==== Sisu Expressway (Jiangsu) ====
The S8 Sisu Expressway is an expressway between the provinces of Jiangsu and Anhui. It is now part of the Yanluo Expressway.

The first section to the Anhui provincial boundary is 8.05 kilometers long and opened to traffic on 20 December 2017. The section from Cangji to Sihong County is 38.18 kilometers long and was opened to traffic on 30 December 2021.

=== Anhui ===
==== Sisu Expressway (Anhui) ====
The Anhui section of the Sisu Expressway forms part of the Yanluo Expressway and is designated as the S04 Expressway.

The section from the provincial boundary to Si County has a total length of 23.4 kilometers. Construction started on 16 November 2009 and was opened to traffic on 20 December 2017. The section from Si County to Suzhou has a total length of 91.94 kilometers. Construction started on 12 January 2008 and opened to traffic on 28 December 2010.

==== Sudeng Expressway ====
The S06 Sudeng Expressway consists of two separate sections connected together via the Yongdeng Expressway in Henan.

The Huaibei section is 52.2 kilometers long and opened to traffic on 24 December 2012. The Bozhou section is 39.5 kilometers long and opened to traffic on 12 December 2011.

=== Henan ===
==== Yongdeng Expressway ====
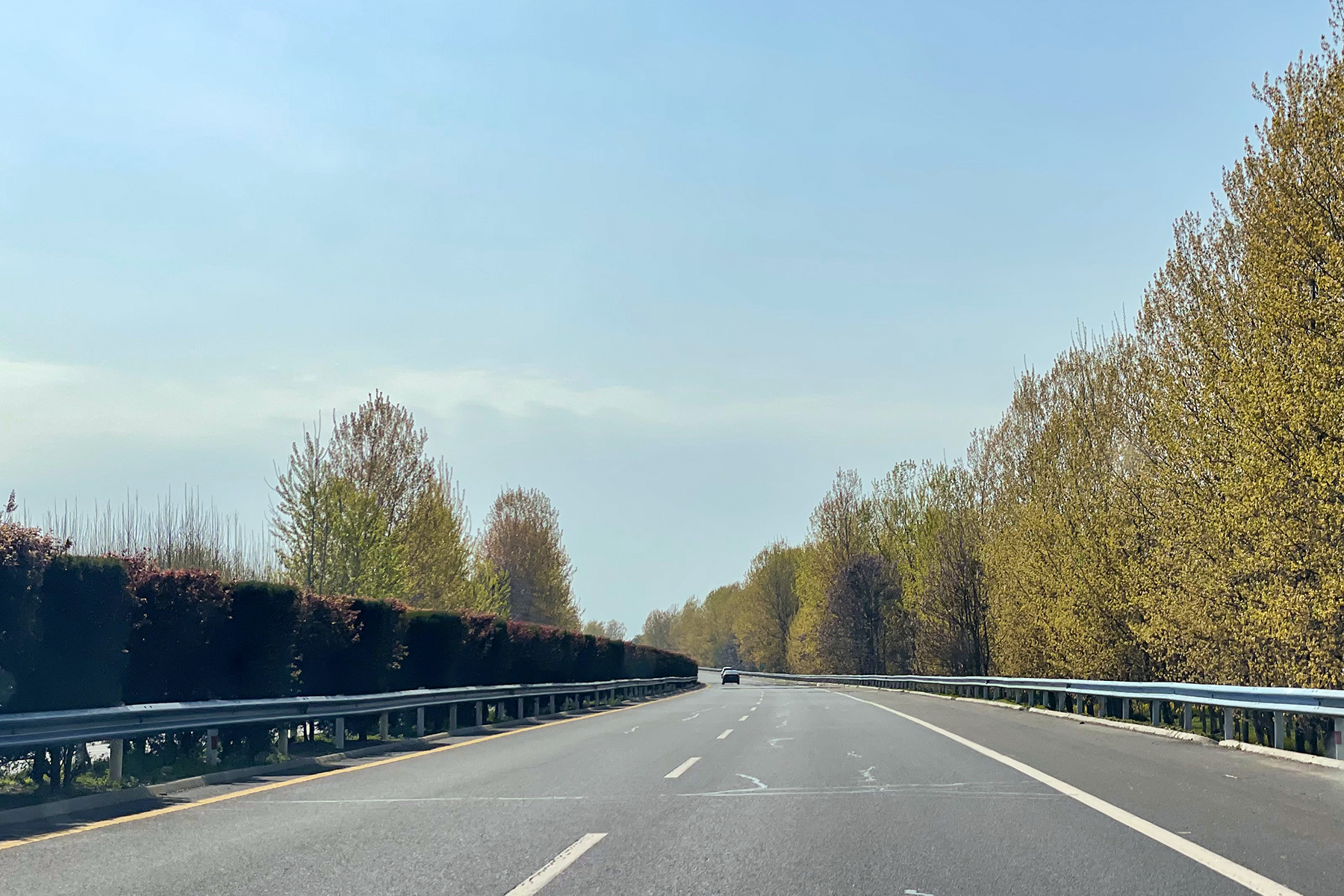
Yanluo Expressway in Luyi County

The Yongdeng Expressway consists of two separate sections connected together via the Sudeng Expressway in Anhui.

The section from Renzhuang to Xiaoxinzhuang is 45.94 kilometers long and was opened to traffic on 26 December 2010. The Zhoukou section has a total length of 125.66 kilometers and was opened to traffic on 30 November 2007. The Xufu Expressway section is 27.83 kilometers long and was opened to traffic on 8 October 2007. The Lanxu Expressway section was opened to traffic on 19 November 2005, and the Xupingnan Expressway section was opened to traffic on 12 December 2004. The Xuyu Expressway section has a total length of 39.07 kilometers and was opened to traffic on 30 November 2007 and the Yudeng Expressway section has a total length of 48.38 kilometers and was opened to traffic on 8 October 2007.

==== Zhenglu Expressway ====
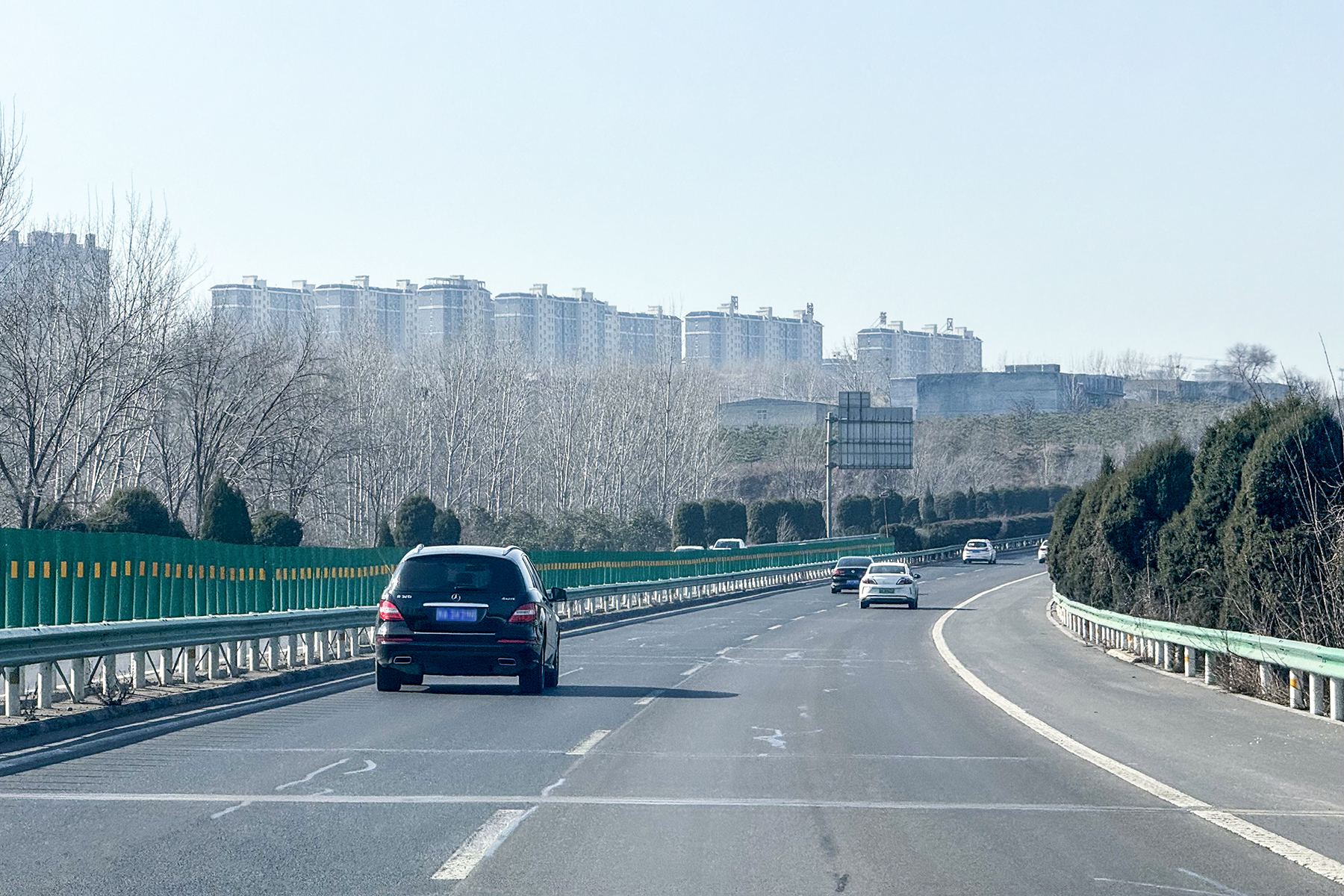
Yanluo Expressway in Dengfeng

The Zhenglu Expressway connects Zhengzhou to Luoyang and the original expressway number of Henan Province was S85. The section from Dengfeng to Yichuan County is part of the Yanluo Expressway.

The section from Zhengzhou to the Shaolin Monastery is 53.25 kilometers long and was opened to traffic on 28 December 2003. The Shaolin Monastery to Luoyang section (Shaoluo Expressway) is 58.76 kilometers long and was opened to traffic on 12 August 2005.
