= Luyi County =

Luyi 鹿邑县
- County
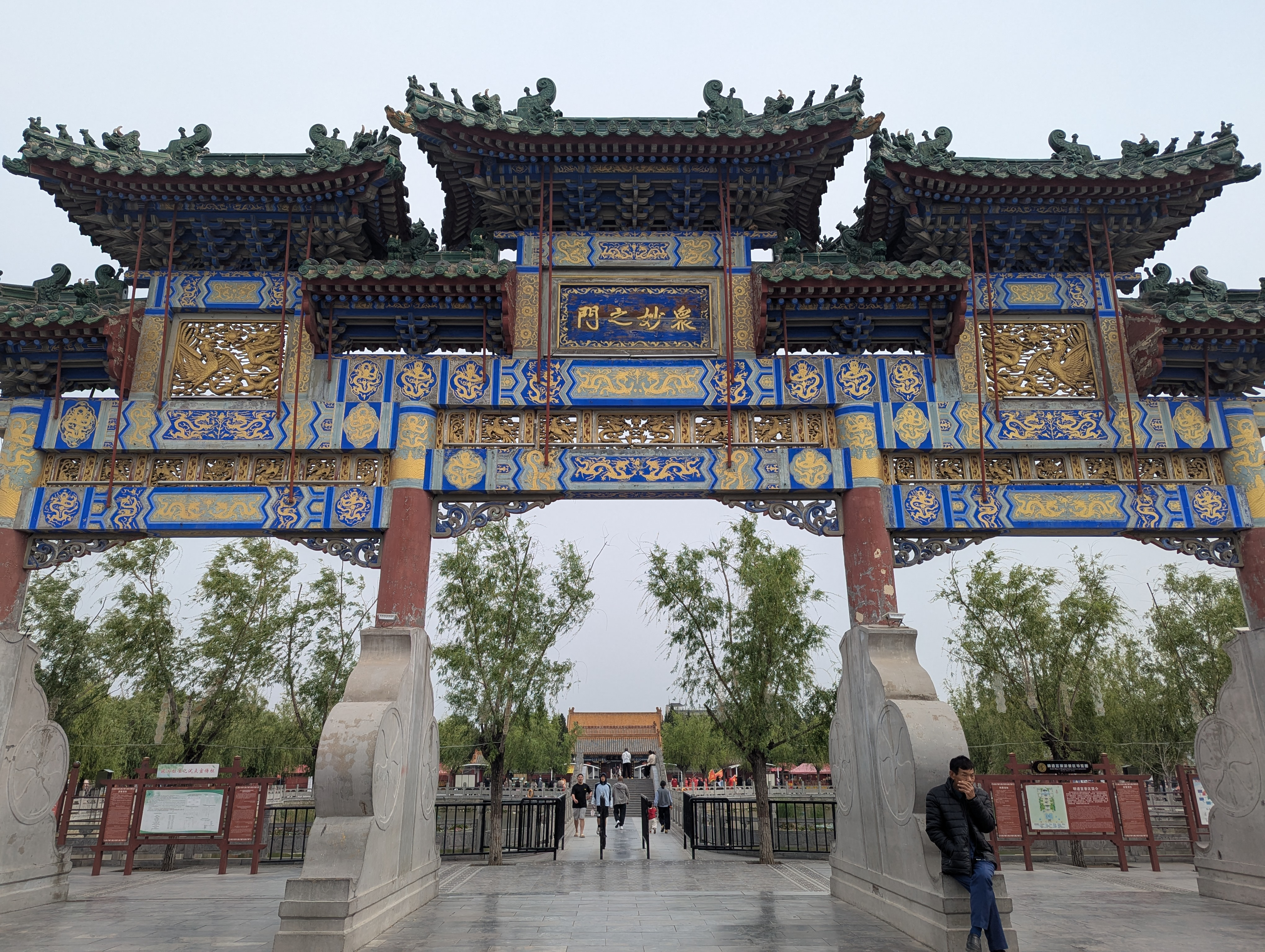
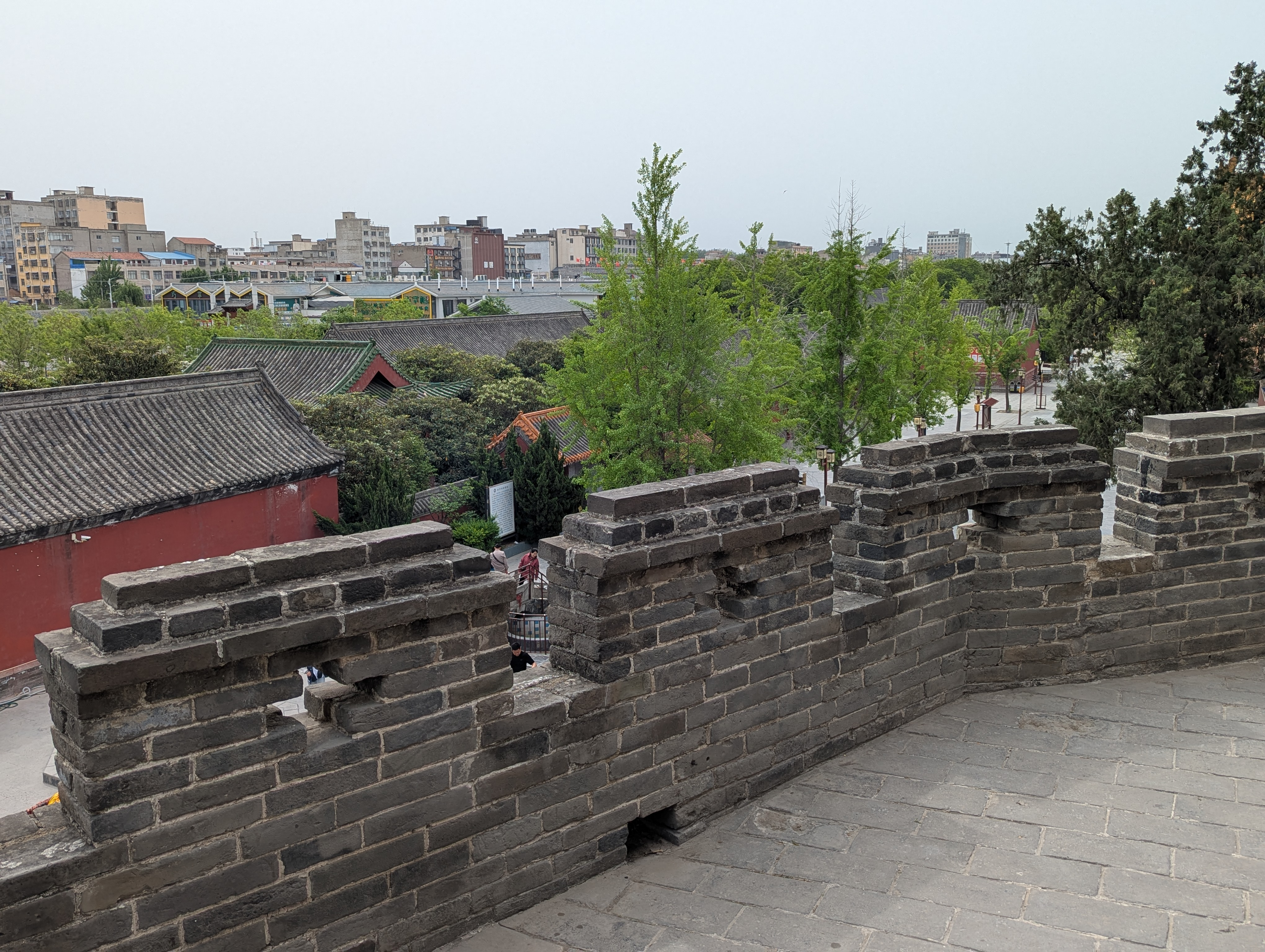
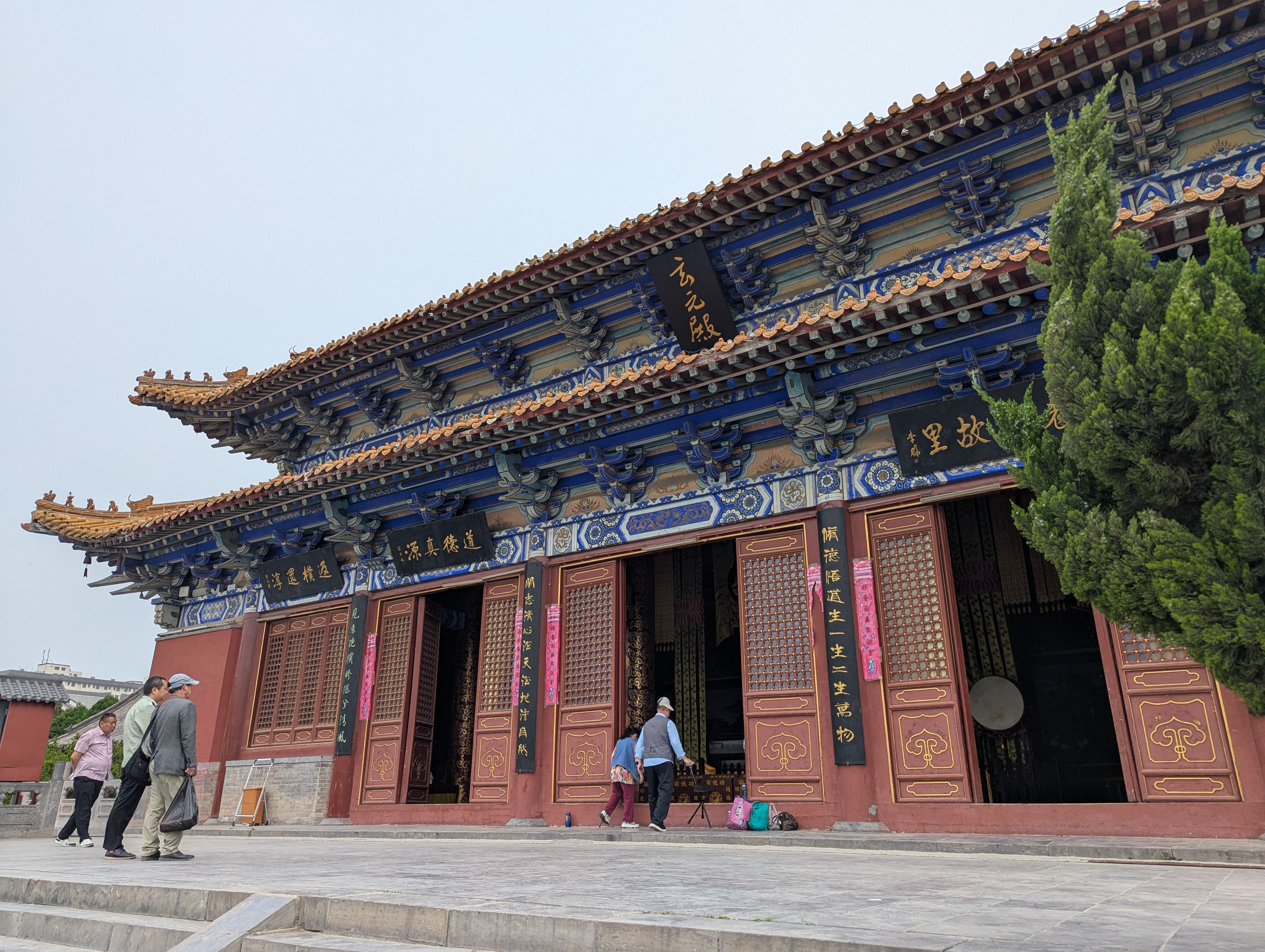
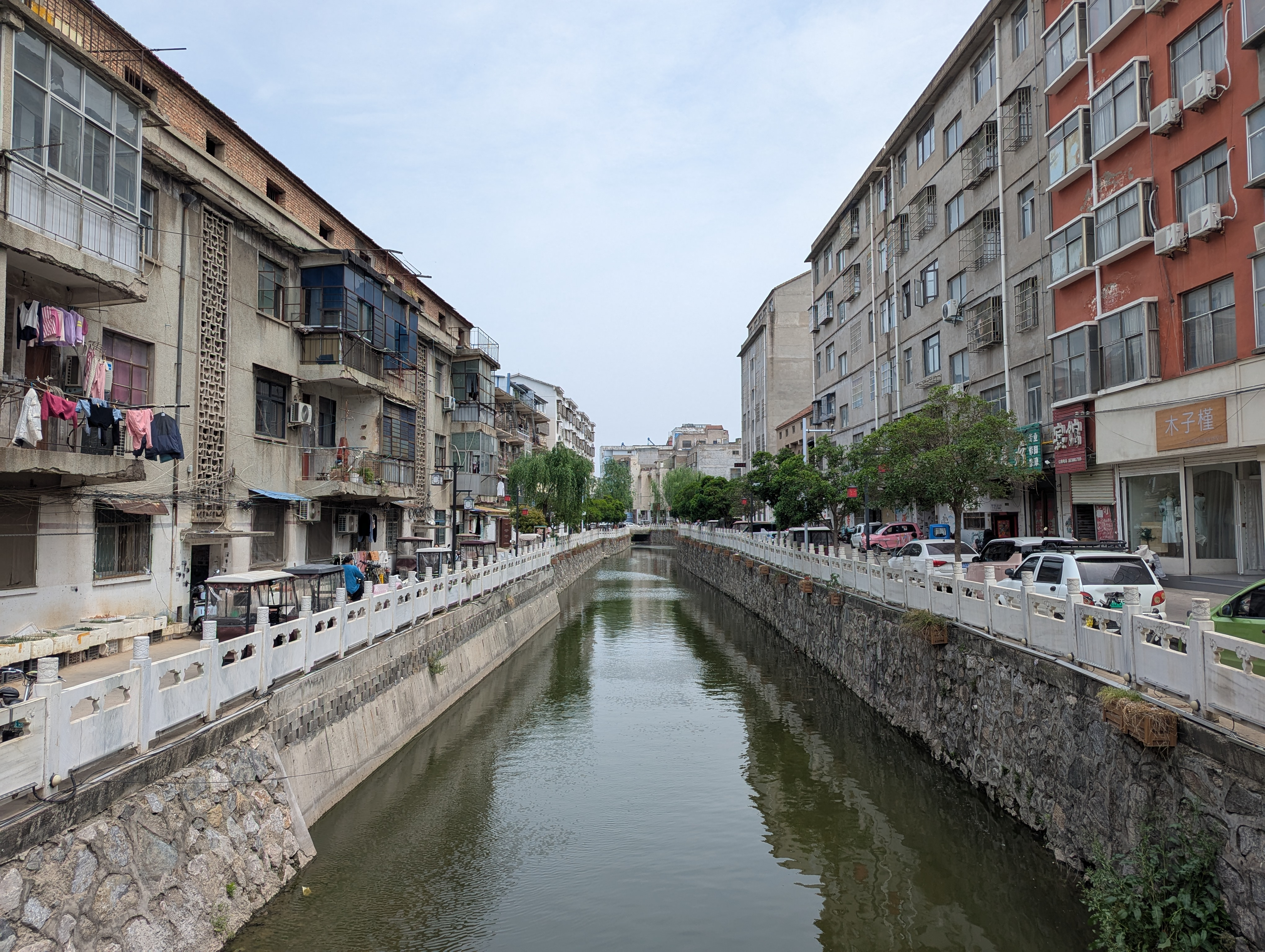

- Location in Henan
- Coordinates: 33°51′36″N 115°29′02″E
- Country: People's Republic of China
- Province: Henan
- Prefecture-level city: Zhoukou

Area
  - Total: 1,248 km^{2} (482 sq mi)
- Elevation: 41 m (135 ft)

Population (2019)
  - Total: 878,200
  - Density: 703.7/km^{2} (1,823/sq mi)
- Time zone: UTC+8 (China Standard)
- Postal code: 477200
- Website: www.luyi.gov.cn/portal/index.htm

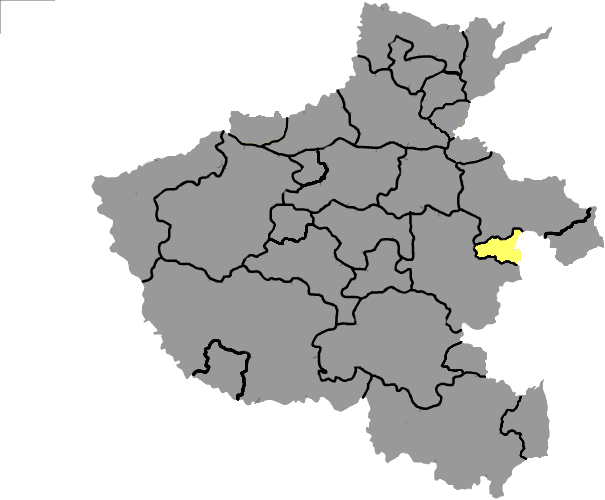
Location of Luyi county in Henan province, China

Luyi County (simplified Chinese: 鹿邑县; traditional Chinese: 鹿邑縣; pinyin: Lùyì Xiàn) is a county of eastern Henan, People's Republic of China, bordering Anhui province to the east. It is under the administration of Zhoukou City.

The county is known for its make-up brushes production, with over 150 million brushes produced annually. This industry started concentrating in Luyi in the 2010s, the county already had a wool processing industry before.

According to Sima Qian's Records of the Grand Historian, the village of Quren (曲仁里, Qūrén lǐ) in Li township (厲鄉, Lì xiāng) in Chu's Ku County (苦縣, Kǔ xiàn) was the birthplace of the legendary philosopher Laozi. This lies within what is now Luyi. During the Song dynasty, the Taiqing Palace was built in Luyi, an important Taoist shrine. Although it only exists as ruins nowadays, it remains an important religious and archeological site.

According to some historians, the Battle of Gaixia took place in what is now Luyi County.

== Administrative divisions ==
As of 2012, this county is divided to 9 towns and 13 townships.

Towns

- Chengguan (城关镇)
- Xuanwu (玄武镇)
- Zaoji (枣集镇)
- Taiqinggong (太清宫镇)
- Wangpiliu (王皮溜镇)
- Shiliang (试量镇)
- Xinji (辛集镇)
- Mapu (马铺镇)
- Wobei (涡北镇)

Townships

- Luyi Township (城郊乡)
- Zhengjiaji Township (郑家集乡)
- Guantang Township (观堂乡)
- Shengtiezhong Township (生铁冢乡)
- Zhangdian Township (张店乡)
- Zhaocun Township (赵村乡)
- Renji Township (任集乡)
- Tangji Township (唐集乡)
- Gaoji Township (高集乡)
- Qiuji Township (邱集乡)
- Mudian Township (穆店乡)
- Yanghukou Township (杨湖口乡)
- Jiatan Township (贾滩乡)

== Climate ==
Climate data for Luyi, elevation 41 m (135 ft), (1991–2020 normals, extremes 1981–present)
Month	Jan	Feb	Mar	Apr	May	Jun	Jul	Aug	Sep	Oct	Nov	Dec	Year
Record high °C (°F)	18.6 (65.5)	26.2 (79.2)	33.0 (91.4)	33.3 (91.9)	39.0 (102.2)	40.8 (105.4)	40.2 (104.4)	39.2 (102.6)	36.8 (98.2)	35.1 (95.2)	28.3 (82.9)	21.0 (69.8)	40.8 (105.4)
Mean daily maximum °C (°F)	6.0 (42.8)	9.7 (49.5)	15.1 (59.2)	21.5 (70.7)	26.8 (80.2)	31.8 (89.2)	32.3 (90.1)	30.8 (87.4)	27.3 (81.1)	22.3 (72.1)	14.6 (58.3)	8.1 (46.6)	20.5 (68.9)
Daily mean °C (°F)	0.9 (33.6)	4.0 (39.2)	9.3 (48.7)	15.5 (59.9)	20.9 (69.6)	25.7 (78.3)	27.5 (81.5)	26.1 (79.0)	21.6 (70.9)	16.0 (60.8)	8.9 (48.0)	2.9 (37.2)	14.9 (58.9)
Mean daily minimum °C (°F)	−3.1 (26.4)	−0.4 (31.3)	4.3 (39.7)	9.9 (49.8)	15.4 (59.7)	20.4 (68.7)	23.6 (74.5)	22.6 (72.7)	17.3 (63.1)	11.1 (52.0)	4.4 (39.9)	−1.1 (30.0)	10.4 (50.7)
Record low °C (°F)	−18.6 (−1.5)	−15.3 (4.5)	−7.6 (18.3)	−2.6 (27.3)	3.6 (38.5)	12.0 (53.6)	16.5 (61.7)	13.0 (55.4)	6.6 (43.9)	−1.1 (30.0)	−7.4 (18.7)	−19.1 (−2.4)	−19.1 (−2.4)
Average precipitation mm (inches)	16.4 (0.65)	22.0 (0.87)	31.9 (1.26)	43.7 (1.72)	67.9 (2.67)	98.8 (3.89)	180.9 (7.12)	128.0 (5.04)	70.6 (2.78)	45.9 (1.81)	36.3 (1.43)	16.0 (0.63)	758.4 (29.87)
Average precipitation days (≥ 0.1 mm)	4.2	5.0	5.9	6.2	7.7	7.7	11.2	11.0	8.7	6.3	6.3	4.2	84.4
Average snowy days	3.6	2.6	1.1	0.1	0	0	0	0	0	0	0.8	2.0	10.2
Average relative humidity (%)	69	67	66	69	70	69	80	85	80	73	72	69	72
Mean monthly sunshine hours	121.4	131.9	170.0	196.9	205.4	188.8	183.2	167.4	156.8	152.5	134.3	127.3	1,935.9
Percentage possible sunshine	38	42	46	50	48	44	42	41	43	44	43	42	44
Source: China Meteorological Administration
