= List of prisons in Hebei =

This is a list of prisons within Hebei province of the People's Republic of China.

== Hebei ==
Source: (Warning: insecure connection)

=== Shijiazhuang ===
Prisons					
Name	Enterprise name	City/County/District	Village/Town	Established	Notes
Hebei Women's Prison(河北女子监狱)		Shijiazhuang			
Huolu Prison(获鹿监狱)	Lishuangdian Farm; Xinsheng Cement Plant	Luquan County, Shijiazhuang		1997	
Luquan Prison(鹿泉监狱)		Shijiazhuang			
Hebei Juvenile Offender Detachment(河北未成年犯管教所)	Yanshan Plastics Factory	Shijiazhuang			
Shijiazhuang Beijiao PrisonHebei No. 4 Prison(石家庄北郊监狱)	Shijiazhuang Automobile Manufacturing Company	Shijiazhuang		1946	Changlu brand passenger buses are produced there
Shijiazhuang Prison(石家庄监狱)	Xinsheng Mechanical Processing Plant Garment Factory	Qiaoxi District, Shijiazhuang	Huolu		In July 2003, the prison and Fujian Longyan City Longjing Corporation
Detention centers					
Name	Enterprise name	City/County/District	Village/Town	Established	Notes
Shijiazhuang No. 1 Detention Center(石家庄市第一看守所)		Shijiazhuang, Hebei			
Shijiazhuang No. 2 Detention Center(石家庄市第二看守所)		Shijiazhuang, Hebei			
Zhao County Detention Center(赵县看守所)		Zhao County			
Xinle Detention Center(新乐市看守所)		Xinle, Hebei			
Jingxing Detention Center(井陉县看守所)		Jingxing County			
Zhengding Detention Center(正定县看守所)		Zhengding, Hebei			
Gaoyi Detention Center(高邑县看守所)		Gaoyi County, Hebei			
Yuanshi Detention Center(元氏县看守所)		Yuanshi County			
Zanhuang Detention Center(赞皇县看守所)		Zanhuang County			
Pingshan Detention Center(平山县看守所)		Pingshan County, Hebei			
Lingshou Detention Center(灵寿县看守所)		Lingshou County			
Xingtang Detention Center(行唐县看守所)		Xingtang County			
Wuji Detention Center(无极县看守所)		Wuji County			
Xinji Detention Center(辛集市看守所)		Xinji, Hebei			
Shenze Detention Center(深泽县看守所)		Shenze County			
Jinzhou Detention Center (Hebei)(晋州市看守所)		Jinzhou, Hebei			
Shijiazhuang No. 1 Custody Center(石家庄市第一拘留所)		Shijiazhuang, Hebei			
Shijiazhuang No. 2 Custody Center(石家庄市第二拘留所)		Shijiazhuang, Hebei			
Zhao Custody Center(赵县拘留所)		Zhao County			
Xinle Custody Center(新乐市拘留所)		Xinle, Hebei			
Jingxing Custody Center(井陉县拘留所)		Jingxing County			
Zhengding Custody Center(正定县拘留所)		Zhengding County			
Gaoyi Custody Center(高邑县拘留所)		Gaoyi County, Hebei			
Yuanshi Custody Center(元氏县拘留所)		Yuanshi County			
Zanhuang Custody Center(赞皇县拘留所)		Zanhuang, Hebei			
Pingshan Custody Center(平山县拘留所)		Pingshan County, Hebei			
Lingshou Custody Center(灵寿县拘留所)		Lingshou, Hebei			
Xingtang Custody Center(行唐县拘留所)		Xingtang County			
Wuji Custody Center(石家庄市无极县拘留所)		Wuji, Hebei			
Xinji Custody Center(辛集市拘留所)		Xinji, Hebei			
Shenze Custody Center(深泽县拘留所)		Shenze County			

=== Tangshan ===
Prisons					
Name	Enterprise name	City/County/District	Village/Town	Established	Notes
Jidong Prison(冀东监狱)	Nanbao Saltworks; Nanbao Chemical Plant; Jidong Prison Build & Repair Plastic Factory Workshop	Tangshan			In Nanbao Development Zone, the largest prison in the country, produces salt of Haiwan brand, acreage of 320 km2
Tangshan Juvenile Offender Detachment(唐山未成年犯管教所)		Tangshan			
Tangshan Prison(唐山监狱)		Tangshan	Guye District		
Detention centers					
Name	Enterprise name	City/County/District	Village/Town	Established	Notes
Yutian Detention Center(玉田县看守所)		Yutian County, Hebei			
Qianxi Detention Center(迁西县看守所)		Qianxi County, Hebei			
Luannan Detention Center(滦南县看守所)		Luannan County, Hebei			
Luanzhou Detention Center(滦州看守所)		Luanzhou			
Tangshan No. 2 Detention Center(唐山市第二看守所)		Tangshan, Hebei			
Tangshan No.1 Detention Center(唐山市第一看守所)		Tangshan, Hebei			
Laoting Detention Center(乐亭县看守所)		Laoting County			
Zunhua Detention Center(遵化市看守所)		Zunhua			
Qian'an Center(迁安市拘留所)		Qian'an, Hebei			
Zunhua Custody Center(遵化市拘留所)		Zunhua			

=== Cangzhou ===
Prisons					
Name	Enterprise name	City/County/District	Village/Town	Established	Notes
Cangnan Prison(沧南监狱)		Cangzhou		1995	
Cangzhou Prison(沧州监狱)	Cangzhou Machinery Factory	Yunhe District, Cangzhou			
Detention centers					
Name	Enterprise name	City/County/District	Village/Town	Established	Notes
Cangzhou Detention Center(沧州市看守所)		Cangzhou, Hebei			
Botou Detention Center(泊头市看守所)		Botou, Hebei			
Renqiu Detention Center(任丘市看守所)		Renqiu, Hebei			
Huanghua Detention Center(黄骅市看守所)		Huanghua, Hebei			
Hejian Detention Center(河间市看守所)		Hejian, Hebei			
Dongguang Detention Center(东光县看守所)		Dongguang			
Qing County Detention Center(青县看守所)		Qing County			
Haixing Detention Center(海兴县看守所)		Haixing			
Yanshan Detention Center(盐山县看守所)		Yanshan County, Hebei			
Suning Detention Center(肃宁县看守所)		Suning County			
Nanpi Detention Center(南皮县看守所)		Nanpi County			
Wuqiao Detention Center(吴桥县看守所)		Wuqiao County			
Xian County Detention Center(献县看守所)		Xian County			
Mengcun Detention Center(孟村县看守所)		Mengcun County			

== Others ==
Prisons					
Name	Enterprise name	City/County/District	Village/Town	Established	Notes
Baoding Prison(保定监狱)	Baoding District Xinsheng Machine Works; Baoding Xingguang Printing Works	Baoding			
Chengde Prison(承德监狱)	Chengde Rubber Shoes Factory	Chengde		1951	
Daming Prison(大名监狱)	Brickyard	Handan	Wandi		Incorporated into Handan City Prison in 2007
Dingzhou Prison(定州监狱)		Dingzhou		1950	
Guyuan Prison(沽源监狱)		Guyuan, Zhangjiakou			
Handan Prison(邯郸监狱)		Handan			Daming and Zhanghe prisons merged to this prison
Hengshui Prison(衡水监狱)		Hengshui			
Jizhong Prison(冀中监狱)	Hebei Prov. Tiaoshan Chemical Plant	Mancheng County, Baoding		1955	
Longyao Prison(隆尧监狱)	Tangzhuang Farm	Longyao County, Xingtai			
Shahe Prison(沙河监狱)	Xingtai City Shahe Prison Distillery	Xingtai	Shahe		In Liucun Farm
Shangbancheng Prison(上板城监狱)	Shangbancheng Jinhao Clothing Plant	Chengde	Shangbancheng	1965	
Shenzhou PrisonHebei No. 3 Prison(深州监狱)		Shenzhou			Holds more than 3,000 severe criminals
Taihang Prison（太行监狱）ancheng Chemical Works; Hebei Tarp plant	Baoding	Mancheng County		Includes 3,000 male prisoners and 800 female prisoners, 5,000 tons of potassium carbonate have been exported to numerous countries	
Xingtai Prison(邢台监狱)	Hebei Prov. XingDu General Machine Factory	Xingtai, Hebei		1951	Since foundation at least 16,998 prisoners have been released with complete sentences, location being Zhangdonggang. In 2006, the prison held about 2,000 inmates with sentences of 15 years or less
Zhanghe Prison(漳河监狱)	Chicken and Pig Farm	Handan		1962	Merged to Handan Prison in 2007
Zhangjiakou Prison(张家口监狱)		Xuanhua District, Zhangjiakou	Shalingzi		
Zhuolu Prison(涿鹿监狱)	Zhuolu County Datangwan Xinsheng Casting Works	Zhuolu, Zhangjiakou			Also called Datangwan Prison

== Sources ==
- "Laogai Handbook 2007-2008" (PDF) (in Chinese and English). Washington, D.C.: Laogai Research Foundation. October 2008. pp. 149–160. ISBN 978-1-931550-25-3.
