= Hao (surname) =

Hao (郝)
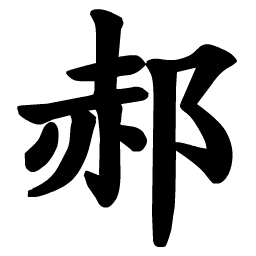
- Pronunciation: Hǎo (Mandarin)
- Language: Chinese

Origin
- Language: Old Chinese
- Meaning: a place in modern-day Shanxi province

Other names
- Variant form: Hau

Hao is the Mandarin pinyin and Wade–Giles romanization of the Chinese surname written 郝 in Chinese characters. It is listed 77th in the Song dynasty classic text Hundred Family Surnames. As of 2008, it is the 82nd most common surname in China, shared by 2.7 million people.

Origins:

1. the name of a fief (located in modern Taiyuan, Shanxi) granted to Zi Qi, a person during the reign of king Di Yi during the Shang dynasty
2. traced back to the Wuhuan people
3. traced back to a minority ethnic group in ancient southern China.

== Notable people ==
- Hao Meng (died 196), Eastern Han officer under Lü Bu
- Hao Zhao (fl. 228), Cao Wei general
- Hao Chujun (607–681), Tang dynasty chancellor
- Hao Weizhen (1842–1920), tai chi master
- Hao Peng (1881–?), Republic of China politician
- Hao Mengling (1892–1937), Republic of China general
- Hao Pengju (1903–1947), Republic of China general
- Fan Ming, born Hao Keyong (1914–2010), general and leader in Tibet
- Andrew Hao or Hao Jinli (1916–2011), bishop of Roman Catholic Diocese of Xiwanzi
- Hau Pei-tsun or Hao Bocun (1919–2020), retired general and former Premier of the Republic of China
- Hao Jianxiu (born 1935), PRC politician, member of the Secretariat of the Chinese Communist Party
- Hao Jiming (born 1946), environmental engineer, member of the Chinese Academy of Engineering.
- Hau Lung-pin or Hao Longbin (born 1952), Mayor of Taipei, son of Hau Pei-tsun
- Hao Ping (born 1959), PRC Vice Minister of Education
- Hao Peng (born 1960), PRC politician, Governor of Qinghai province
- Hao Haitao (born 1968), football player and coach
- Hao Haidong (born 1970), football player
- Hao Qun (born 1974), writer with pen name of Murong Xuecun
- Hao Wei (born 1976), football player
- Hao Lei (born 1978), actress
- Hao Shuai (born 1983), table tennis player
- Hao Junmin (born 1987), football player
- Hao Xingchen, football player
- Hao Yonghe (born 1989), football player
- Hao Yun (born 1995), swimmer, Olympic medalist
- Hao Siwen, a character in the classical novel Water Margin
- Leo Hao, Russian artist
- Lin Hao, Chinese architect
- Dan Hao (郝丹), Chinese software engineer

== See also ==
- Hao (given name)
- Hao (name)
- Haozhuang (disambiguation), villages connected to the Hao family
