= Hao Peng =

Hao Peng may refer to:

- Hao Peng (ROC), Republic of China politician of the Wang Jingwei regime
- Hao Peng (PRC), People's Republic of China politician, Communist Party Secretary of Liaoning
- Hao Peng (footballer) (born 2001), Chinese footballer for Shanghai Port

== See also ==
- Hao Ping, Chinese historian and academic administrator
