= Mucun =

Mucun may refer to:

- Mucun, Shanxi (穆村镇), town in Liulin County
- Mucun Township, Shenzhou (穆村乡), Hebei
- Mucun Township, Xinle (木村乡), Hebei
- Mucun Township, Jiangxi (睦村乡), in Jinggangshan City

== See also ==
- Guan Mucun
