= Peng Hao =

Peng Hao may refer to:

- Peng Hao (footballer, born 1993), (彭浩) Chinese association football player
- Peng Hao (footballer, born 2001), (彭号) Chinese association football player
