= Beisu =

Beisu could refer to these towns in China:

- Beisu, Hebei (北苏), in Wuji County, Hebei
- Beisu, Shandong (北宿), in Zoucheng, Shandong
