= International Ecological Economy Promotion Association =

- Abbreviation: IEEPA
- Established: 21 October 2015
- Type: International Non-profit Environmental Protection
- Headquarters: Beijing, China
- Staff: 11-50
- Website: http://ieepa.org/

The International Ecological Economy Promotion Association (IEEPA) is a professional non-governmental organization based in Beijing, China. The IEEPA works on promoting international energy conservation, environmental protection and sustainable development and in particular the ecological economy.

== History ==
The IEEPA was founded in 2007 and was officially registered on 21 October 2015, before this the IEEPA was known as the International Energy Conservation and Environmental Protection Association. The IEEPA, since 2015, has made attempts to promote the ecological economy. During this transition the IEEPA continued to carry out many of the functions and responsibilities previously held by the Energy Conservation and Environmental Protection Association.

== Governance ==
Board of Directors	Background
	The current president of the IEEPA, Hao Jiming, has been recognized for his influential work on emission control strategies to challenging the severe air pollution in China over the last forty years. His notable achievements include successfully designing mitigation plans in acid deposition and urban vehicle pollution control.
	Li Junyang has served as the Executive Vice-President of the IEEPA since 2015. Li Junyang has led previous efforts by the IEEPA to improve ecological, social and grassroots governance in China as well as ecological poverty alleviation efforts in Hubei province.

== Objectives ==
IEEPA has identified three key operating areas:

1. Research and Construction of Domestic and Foreign Policy Issues. The IEEPA has ambitions of assembling experts from a wide range of sectors including research, expert resources, academics policy institutes and international agencies to cooperate together.
2. System Solutions Program for Urban Development. Within the regional and urban areas, IEEPA aims to work towards creating green development measures, through the innovative market model of accelerating energy saving technology.
3. Energy Conservation and Environmental Protection Promotional System. A priority of the IEEPA is to promote enterprise projects that have demonstrated potential growth, while focusing on the utilization of resources through sustainable management and energy efficiency.

== Activities ==
The IEEPA, since its creation, has collaborated with a number of organisations domestically and internationally. In 2013 the IEEPA co-launched The Global Innovation Centre for Nano-Fibre Application (GICNA) with the Czech Nafigate Corp to advance technological innovation in green environment. Such innovation included clean water resources, clean air and energy conservation.

In 2015, the IEEPA worked together with non-governmental organisations from South Korea. Such cooperation included Sung Information Co. Ltd, a South Korean solution service provider who donated equipment to the Chinese Primary Health Care Foundation (CPHCF). The IEEPA saw this collaboration as a way of advancing public health programs in poverty stricken regions within China. The IEEPA sees the cooperation between different charities beyond China as building a platform for research and development between China and other States.

As part of the organising committee for the World Economic and Environmental Conference (WEC), the IEEPA has been a constant participant in the annual conference. The WEC was initially formed by the United Nations Green New Deal in 2008 with over 6000 participants from nearly 60 countries and many international organisations. The conference was set up to promote sustainable development of the world economy but also to advance the ecological economy.
