= Chenzhuang =

Chénzhuāng (陈庄) could refer to the following locations in China:

Towns

- Chenzhuang, Lingshou County, Hebei
- Chenzhuang, Huantai County, Shandong
- Chenzhuang, Lijin County, Shandong

Townships

- Chenzhuang Township, Xian County, Hebei
- Chenzhuang Township, Biyang County, Henan
- Chenzhuang Township, Fan County, Henan
- Chenzhuang Township, Linying County, Henan

Village

- Chenzhuang, Wanquan in Wanquan, Honghu, Jingzhou, Hubei
