= Zhejiang Football Super League =

- Founded: 2003
- Country: China
- Divisions: 2
- Number of clubs: 16
- Level on pyramid: 5 (Division A); 6 (Division B)
- Promotion to: CMCL
- Current champions: Lishui Kehang (1st title)
- Most championships: Ningbo Daxie Jindao (5 titles)
- Current: 2025 Zhejiang Football Super League

The Zhejiang Football Super League (ZSL) is a league of football teams from Zhejiang, China. Formed in 2003, the leagues sits at level 5–6 on the pyramid system. There are 8 teams in 2 divisions separately. It is a feeder to the CMCL.

The league organised by the Zhejiang Football Association, is the top league of Zhejiang Province.

== Format ==
The ZSL is divided into 2 divisions of 8 teams each, starting from season 2020.

Teams in Division A play each other twice in the league (home and away), receiving three points for a win and one point for a draw. No points are awarded for a loss. At the end of each season, the club with the most points is crowned ZSL Division A champions. There is no established format for the Division B, and the tournament system is temporarily used for season 2020 and 2021.

=== Promotion and relegation ===
==== CMCL / Division A ====
The champions of Division A may qualify for the CMCL.

==== Division A / Division B ====
The champions of Division B are directly promoted to the Division A, swapping places with the bottom club of Division A. The club finishing 2nd in Division B, and the 7th placed team in Division A then enter the play-off to decide a place in next season.

==== Division B / lower-level leagues ====
Promotion places will only be awarded if a team withdraws from the Division B.

The other teams in the qualifying round come from the winning teams in the lower-level leagues (or recommended by lower-level FA), which are:

- Hangzhou FA Super League
- Huzhou Super League
- Lishui 9-a-side Clubs League
- Ningbo Super League
- Wenzhou Amateur Super League
- Zhoushan League One

== History ==
=== Zhejiang Football Cities Championships League ===
Created in 2003, Zhejiang Football Cities Championships League (ZCCL) is the first province-level association football league in Zhejiang, and its predecessor was the Zhejiang Football Association Cup (founded in the 1980s). The first season gathered 5 teams to participate, playing each other 2 ties, with Ningbo Xinyongjiang winning the first title. Because ZCCL had become an affiliated league to the Chinese Football Association Bing League by the time, the winning team qualified for that season's China Football Amateur League, but Hangzhou Sinobal took the entry instead of Ningbo Xinyongjiang.

After 13 years of development, by season 2015, the ZCCL had expanded to 14 member teams.

=== Name changing ===
In season 2006, the league changed its name to Zhejiang Football Super League. The first season under current name, 11 teams gained entry, and Ningbo Yinbo won the championship. In season 2020, the league extended to 16 teams and split into 2 divisions.

== Member clubs ==
The clubs listed below have competed in the ZSL/ZCCL since it was created in 2003. Clubs currently playing in the league are shown in bold.

Club	Affiliated FA	Total seasons	Position in 2020	First season in ZSL/ZCCL	Last season in ZSL/ZCCL	First season of current spell in top division of ZSL/ZCCL	Total titles of top division of ZSL/ZCCL	Last title of top division of ZSL/ZCCL
**Ningbo Daxie Jindao**	Ningbo	8	3rd, ZSL Division A	2011	-	2014	5	2019
**Yiwu Lejian**	Jinhua	8	8th, ZSL Division A	2008 (as Yiwu Tumu Construction)	-	2019	0	-
**Jinhua Huayue**	Jinhua	6	6th, ZSL Division A	2016 (as Jinhua Zhongchou)	-	2016 (as Jinhua Zhongchou)	0	-
**Hangzhou Qiantang**	Hangzhou	5	2nd, ZSL Division A	2012 (as Hangzhou Zhipu)	-	2020	0	-
**Huzhou LOHAS**	Huzhou	6	1st, ZSL Division A	2016	-	2016	1	2020
**Wenzhou Ohyeah**	Wenzhou	5	4th, ZSL Division A	2016 (as Wenzhou Ouyan)	-	2018 (as Wenzhou Ouyan)	0	-
**Jiaxing Qinghe**	Jiaxing	6	7th, ZSL Division A	2016	-	2016	0	-
**Hangzhou Mengdingtang**	Hangzhou	2	4th, ZSL Division B	2020	-	-	0	-
**Zhoushan Merdeka**	Zhoushan	4	5th, ZSL Division B	2018	-	-	0	-
**Huzhou Meiqi**	Huzhou	2	7th, ZSL Division B	2020	-	-	0	-
**Haining Morris**	Jiaxing	2	2nd, ZSL Division B	2020	-	-	0	-
**Lishui Red Wing**	Lishui	3	1st, ZSL Division B	2019	-	-	0	-
**Quzhou Xin'an**	Quzhou	6	3rd, ZSL Division B	2016	-	-	0	-
**Ningbo Shoufa**	Ningbo	1	2nd, Ningbo Super League	2021	-	2021	0	-
**Pinghu Qihang**	Jiaxing	1	-	2021	-	2021	0	-
Shaoxing Shangyu Pterosaur	Shaoxing	4	5th, ZSL Division A	2017 (as Shaoxing Jiayu Yilong)	2021	-	0	-
Zhejiang Xinxiucheng	Jiaxing	1	6th, ZSL Division B	2020	2020	-	0	-
Taizhou Tasan	Taizhou	2	8th, ZSL Division B	2019	2020	-	0	-
Hangzhou Wuyue Qiantang	Hangzhou	2	-	2017	2018	-	2	2018
Taizhou Hehe	Taizhou	1	-	2018	2019	-	0	-
Haining 99	Jiaxing	3	-	2012 (as Haining 1999 Ausen)	2018	-	0	-
Zhoushan Aoxiang	Zhoushan	1	unfinished, Zhoushan League One (season 2019–20)	2017	2017	-	0	-
Lishui Lexiang	Lishui	2	-	2017	2018	-	0	-
Zhoushan Tianrui Brothers	Zhoushan	1	-	2016	2016	-	0	-
Lishui Jifeng	Lishui	1	-	2016	2016	-	0	-
Shangyu FA	Shaoxing	2	-	2016	2017	-	0	-
Taizhou Ostrich	Taizhou	2	-	2016	2017	-	0	-
Cangnan 8090	Wenzhou	1	-	2017	2017	-	0	-
Ningbo Xinyongjiang	Ningbo	2	-	2003	2005	-	1	2003
Hangzhou Sinobal	Hangzhou	8	-	2004	2012	-	3	2008
Taizhou Naidi	Taizhou	1	-	2005	2005	-	1	2005
Ningbo Hongao	Ningbo	2	-	2007	2008	-	1	2007
Jiaxing Milo	Jiaxing	1	-	2009	2009	-	1	2009
Ningbo Baoxing	Ningbo	1	-	2010	2010	-	1	2010
Ninghai Feixiang	Ningbo	1	-	2012	2012	-	1	2012
Lishui FA	Lishui	1	-	2013	2013	-	1	2013
Taizhou Delijia	Taizhou	2	-	2003	2004	-	0	-
Shaoxing Pagoda Brand	Shaoxing	2	-	2003	2006	-	0	-
Zhoushan Zhoufeng	Zhoushan	10	-	2003	2014	-	0	-
Shaoxing Tiangong	Shaoxing	1	-	2005	2005	-	0	-
Wenzhou Tongji	Wenzhou	1	-	2005	2005	-	0	-
Shaoxing Jiayu	Shaoxing	2	-	2008	2009	-	0	-
Taizhou Wangye	Taizhou	3	-	2006	2008	-	0	-
Haining Leather City	Jiaxing	2	-	2006	2008	-	0	-
Lishui Jinyun Tianshi Orthopaedic	Lishui	1	-	2006	2006	-	0	-
Yiwu F.C.	Jinhua	1	-	2006	2006	-	0	-
Wenzhou Baoshiniao	Wenzhou	1	-	2007	2007	-	0	-
Wenzhou Lingxi Shengyu	Wenzhou	2	-	2008	2013	-	0	-
Ningbo Jinhui	Ningbo	1	-	2008	2008	-	0	-
Hangzhou Zhanshi Orthopaedics Tanghu	Hangzhou	1	-	2009	2009	-	0	-
Wenzhou Longgang	Wenzhou	3	-	2009	2015	-	0	-
Wenzhou Yongjia Zhongnan	Wenzhou	1	-	2010	2010	-	0	-
Yueqing Beibaixiang	Wenzhou	2	-	2011	2013	-	0	-
Jinhua Letian	Jinhua	1	-	2011	2011	-	0	-
Yiwu Huishang B&J	Jinhua	2	-	2011	2012	-	0	-
Yuyao Eyuyao	Ningbo	1	-	2012	2012	-	0	-
Yongkang Haina	Wenzhou	1	-	2012	2012	-	0	-
Ningbo Youdao DP	Ningbo	2	-	2013 (as Ningbo DP Just)	2014	-	0	-
Quzhou Huateng	Quzhou	2	-	2013	2014	-	0	-
Hangzhou Mengde	Hangzhou	1	-	2014	2014	-	0	-
Wenzhou Xuanda Xinglong	Wenzhou	1	-	2014	2014	-	0	-
Lishui Zhonghang	Lishui	1	-	2014	2014	-	0	-
Wenzhou Jiayun	Wenzhou	1	-	2014	2014	-	0	-
Yiwu Red Ants	Jinhua	2	-	2014	2015	-	0	-
Lishui Qingtian Huawei	Lishui	1	-	2014	2014	-	0	-
Taizhou Wuai	Taizhou	1	-	2015	2015	-	0	-
Haining Kerui	Jiaxing	1	-	2015	2015	-	0	-
Huzhou Welldone	Huzhou	1	-	2015	2015	-	0	-
Quzhou Yifeng	Quzhou	1	-	2015	2015	-	0	-
Zhejiang Dacheng	Huzhou	1	-	2015	2015	-	0	-
Lishui Longquan Keda Lingzhi	Lishui	1	-	2015	2015	-	0	-
Huzhou Changxing Chilwee	Huzhou	1	-	2015	2015	-	0	-

== List of championships ==
Season	Zhejiang Football Cities Championships League					
Season	Winner	Runner-up	Third			
2003	Ningbo Xinyongjiang	Hangzhou Sinobal	Shaoxing Pagoda Brand			
2004	Hangzhou Sinobal	Taizhou Delijia	Zhoushan Zhoufeng			
2005	Taizhou Naidi	Hangzhou Sinobal	Ningbo Xinyongjiang			
2006	Hangzhou Sinobal	Taizhou Wangye	Shaoxing Pagoda Brand			
2007	Ningbo Hongao	Hangzhou Sinobal	Taizhou Wangye			
2008	Hangzhou Sinobal	Wenzhou Lingxi Shengyu	Yiwu Tumu Construction			
2009	Jiaxing Milo	Hangzhou Zhanshi Orthopaedics Tanghu	Shaoxing Jiayu			
2010	Ningbo Baoxing	Hangzhou Sinobal	Wenzhou Yongjia Zhongnan			
2011	Ningbo Yinbo	Hangzhou Sinobal	Yueqing Beibaixiang			
2012	Ninghai Feixiang	Hangzhou Zhipu	Hangzhou Sinobal			
2013	Lishui FA	Yiwu Tumu Construction	Zhoushan Zhoufeng			
2014	Ningbo Yinbo	Hangzhou Mengde	Wenzhou Longgang			
2015	Ningbo Yinbo	Zhejiang Dacheng	Hangzhou Ange, Wenzhou Jiayun			
Season	Zhejiang Football Super League					
Season	Winner	Runner-up	Third			
2016	Ningbo Yinbo	Hangzhou Ange	Huzhou LOHAS			
2017	Hangzhou Wuyue Qiantang	Ningbo Yinbo	Jiaxing Qinghe			
2018	Hangzhou Wuyue Qiantang	Ningbo Yinbo	Huzhou LOHAS			
2019	Ningbo Yinbo	Jinhua Beichen	Wenzhou Ouyan			
Season	ZSL Division A			ZSL Division B		
Season	Winner	Runner-up	Third	Winner	Runner-up	Third
2020	Huzhou LOHAS	Hangzhou Qiantang	Ningbo Daxie Jindao	Lishui Red Wing	Haining Morris	Quzhou Xin'an
2021	Hangzhou Qiantang	Huzhou LOHAS	Ningbo Daxie Jindao			
