= Hantai =

Hantai may refer to:

- Hantai District (汉台区), Hanzhong, China
- Hantai, Hebei (邯邰镇), town in and subdivision of Xinle, Hebei, China
- Pierre Hantaï (born 1964), French conductor and harpsichordist
- Simon Hantaï (1922–2008), painter generally associated with abstract art
