= Timi Zhuo =

Taiwanese singer

- 卓依婷
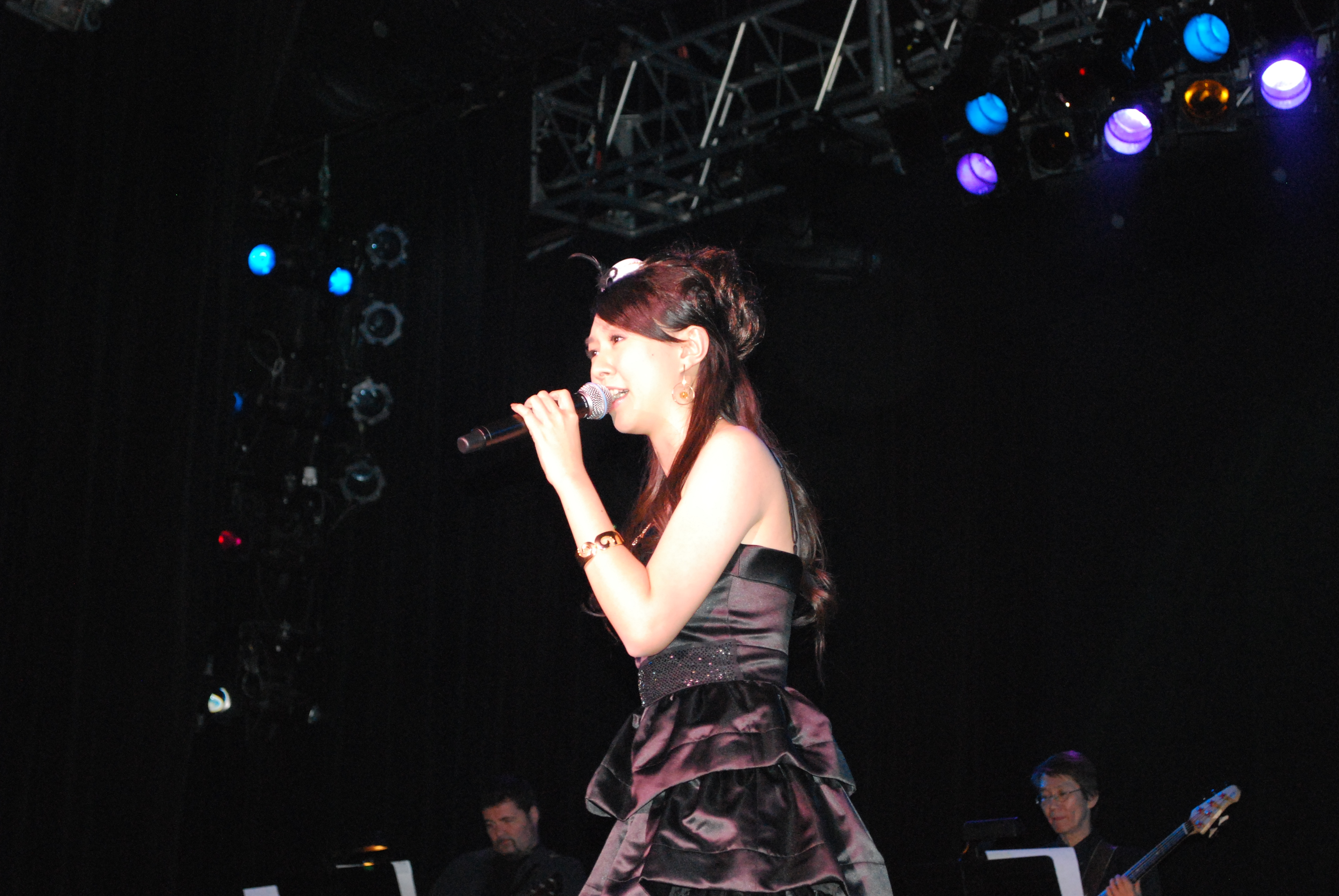
- Zhuo in concert at Atlantic City, NJ, USA in 2009
- Born: Cho Yi-ting; Xinzhuang, New Taipei, Taiwan
- Education: Yu Da High School of Commerce and Home Economics
- Occupations: Singer, actress
- Years active: 1986–present
- Parent: Father: Zhuo Jiachen (卓加陳)
- Musical career
- Also known as: 甜美 Tian Mei (Sweet and Beautiful)
- Origin: Republic of China
- Genres: Mandopop, Cantopop, Hokkien pop, Taiwanese Hokkien
- Instrument: Piano

Chinese name
- Traditional Chinese: 卓依婷
- Simplified Chinese: 卓依婷
Transcriptions
Standard Mandarin
- Hanyu Pinyin: Zhuō Yītíng
- Wade–Giles: Cho^{1} Yi^{1}-t'ing^{2}

Timi Zhuo Yi-ting (Chinese: 卓依婷; pinyin: Zhuō Yītíng) is a singer and actress from Taiwan. She has recorded over 800 songs in Mandarin and Taiwanese Hokkien, and 2 songs in Cantonese.

== Biography ==
Timi Zhuo was born in Xinzhuang District, New Taipei City, Taiwan. When she was about the age of 5, her parents introduced her to the world of show business in singing, music and acting. She did many television commercials and advertisements until the age of 6 when she released her first Hokkien album.

She was skilled at playing piano at a very young age. She was considered as a young and beautiful girl that when she started her singing career that she was given the nickname "Small Princess."

From 1986 to 1991, she starred in many Hokkien soap operas, including 'No more wine for sale 酒矸通卖無', 'Sentiment of the Wind and Rain 风雨情', 'where are you 君在何处', 'love you in the bone 爱你入骨', 'neighbor relatives 隔壁亲家', 'Mother of God 顺天圣母', 'the story of eight faithful dogs 忠义八犬传', 'You are my most loving person 你是我最爱的人', 'little genius 小天才', 'mother 妈妈', 'little angry 冷冷的怒', 'Mother's day 三八亲母', 'Spring wind and autumn rain 春风秋雨', 'powerful prince 盖世皇太子' and 'Unmatched couple 菜鸟配凤凰'. During that period of time, she also recorded many music albums, mostly in Hokkien.

In 1990, she released a series of Hokkien classical songs 歌坛小公主 (The Singing Princess), featuring her playing the piano or guitar as she was singing or dancing. A famous release was the 黄金九岁山歌黄梅调 (Golden 9 years: Huang mei diao Chinese opera) at the age of 9, in which she starred as both boy and girl singing mandarin opera songs in each duet; it was also her first Chinese New Year album. She came out with her first original Hokkien hit, 妈妈在哪里 (Where’s Mama?).

In 1993, she got a role in a Chinese opera play at the Taipei Theater where she acted and sang folk and opera songs, to intense applause. The following year, 1994, she released 黄梅戏经典1 (classical Huang mei diao movie songs); 小调重唱 (Folk Melodies) album containing songs of a look of young person's life in ancient China; 民歌小调 (The Ditty of Folk Songs) featuring famous folk songs; and 恋恋风情 (In Love), classic mandarin songs. She also released the popular 怀念邓丽君金曲 (Remembering Teresa Teng’s Golden Hits) album in tribute to the remembrance of the famous Chinese singer, Teresa Teng.

In 1995, she released 春风妙舞 (Exquisite Spring Dance) as a sequel to 恋恋风情 (In Love), 春风舞曲 (Dance Songs of the Spring Winds) the Chinese New Year album, and 闽南语情歌大对唱 (Minnan Love Song Duets) of Hokkien/Taiwanese love duets with Lin Zhenghua (林正桦).

In 1996, when she was 15, she moved to Beijing, China for the first time. At the same time, she released her first very famous, special edition MTV 蜕变1 (Transformation1) series or 少女的心情故事1 (alias The Story of a Young Girl's Mood-1) together with 校园青春乐 (Youthful Happiness life in School), of school songs and 款款柔情甜歌集 (Collection of Sweet Love Songs), of oldies sung with 凌一惠 (Ling Yi Hui).

In 1997, she recorded 猜心 (Guess the Heart) of popular pop songs, the Spring/CNY albums 春语 (Spring Language), and her solo albums (Hokkien) 恋梦 (Love dream), with the first also known as 少女之情怀 (The love feeling of a young girl) and the second known as 伸手等你牵 (Stretch my hands waiting for you to hold).

In 1998, she recorded 化蝶 (Change to a Butterfly) of classic pop music and 皇牌影视金曲 (Golden Television Hit Songs) of famous television songs.

In 1999, she recorded the 山地情歌1 (Mountain Love Songs): 风之谷 (Warriors of the Wind), 谜 (Mystery), the third album in the 蜕变 (Transformation) series, and the CNY album 拱照北京城大团圆 (Gather in Beijing DVD) or 京城迎新春/京城喜迎春 (Welcome new spring in Beijing VCD), the first of the 八大巨星 (Eight Superstars) series.

In 2000, her solo album of more modern pop music 天使快醒来 (Wake Up, Angel): 伪装 (Camouflage) was released as well as an informational album, 飞舞写真 (Dancing in the Air Photograph).

Zhuo then took a two-year break from her singing career because of stress. Because there was no announcement of the break, an unfounded rumor spread that she had either died from a car accident or died of stomach cancer.

In 2002, she went back on stage again and released the two-part 八大巨星 (Eight superstars) CNY albums, the mandarin 星光闪耀贺新春 (Bright star shining the new spring) and the Hokkien 百万巨星赚大钱 (Million superstars make good money). She also sang the first album in the series of two, 祝福 (Wish You Luck/Blessing).

In 2003, she released 中国时代经典 (China’s Era Classics) that expressed her love for China, 山地情歌2 - the second album in the Mountain love song series, 天地情 (Sky Earth Love), 婷不了的爱 (Endless Love), 蜕变4 - the fourth album in the Transformation series, 黄梅戏经典2: 名曲精萃 (Chinese Opera Classics) of Chinese opera classics, & her third album in the Eight Superstars CNY series, 霸气如虹迎新年 (Welcome new year in the most brilliant way).

In 2004, she recorded 流星雨 (meteor shower), 蜕变5 - the fifth and last album in the Transformation series (also known as "shy and lovely1" 温情脉脉1 on the VCD and "grown up" 亭亭玉立1 on the DVD), 祝福2 (Wish You Luck/Blessing 2): 祝寿歌 (also known as "shy and lovely2" 温情脉脉2 [VCD]/ "grown up2" 亭亭玉立2 [DVD]), the second and last album in the series, and 大胜年 - the fourth album of 八大巨星 (Eight superstars) series.

In 2005, she released the famous Chinese New Year album 送你一个大年糕 (Give You a Big New Year cake) with her original “Give you a big New Year cake” song in it, 福禄寿喜 (Joy of the Three Immortals) - yet another 八大巨星 (Eight Superstar) album, and 燃烧 (Burn), which is a DJ remix of some of her old songs.

In 2006, Zhuo released the modern DJ-type CNY album 热歌辣舞闹新春 (Dance and sing in new spring) and a bestselling album of famous pop songs, 我的眼泪不为你说谎 (My tears don’t lie to you); its title track is her biggest hit song to date.

In 2007, she released 八大巨星 (Eight superstars) 好日子 (Good day) and her famous CNY album 恭喜发财 (Wishing You Happiness and Prosperity) with some of her original Chinese New Year songs. In June, she acted as a teacher in a movie called 緣來是愛 (Blessed Destiny) for a charity foundation without compensation. She also starred in a soap opera series called 丁家有女喜洋洋 (There’s a happy girl in the Ding family) in October, playing the role of an office worker.

In 2008, she had a duet with 罗宾 ("Robin") on the song 採紅菱 (Picking red chestnuts) in the Eight Superstars album, 百福临门满人间.

In 2009, she released another CNY album called 好春天 (Good Spring/Beautiful Spring).

In 2011 she released a Chinese New Year Album called 丰收年 (Good harvest year) and also another album called 同名专辑-卓依婷 (Same name collection - Timi Zhou).

In 2014, she released an album called 親愛的你 (My Dear) featuring one Taiwanese Hokkien song among other Mandarin songs.

She is now living in Taipei and performs mainly in China.

== Concert performances ==
Zhuo has given several concert performances since 2002 in Singapore, Malaysia, USA and China. She is very famous for Chinese New Year songs as well as pop and folk music.

Timi Zhuo's most recent performances:

Date	Concert	City	Country
2007-05-19	Zhuo and S. Wing	Guangzhou, Guangdong province	China
2007-10-06	Zhuo and Dave Wong	Guangdong province	China
2009-09-19	Zhuo and Alex To	Atlantic City, New Jersey	USA
2011-12-24	solo concert	Guangzhou, Guangdong province	China
2012-04-30	solo concert	Zhongshan, Guangdong province	China
2012-10-22	solo concert	Genting Highlands	Malaysia
2012-12-24	solo concert	Guangzhou, Guangdong province	China
2012-12-28	solo concert	Lu'an, Anhui province	China
2013-11-23	Zhuo and others	Guangxi province	China
2014-01-19	Zhuo and others	Hengyang, Hunan province	China
2014-05-02	Zhuo and others	Jiangxi province	China
2014-08-05	Zhuo and others	Sichuan province	China
2014-09-13	Zhuo and others	Guizhou province	China
2026-06-27	Zhuo and others (video)	Guangzhou, Guandong province	China

She is advertised in concert posters using the nicknames used by her fans, "柔聲歌后", "賀歲公主" and "賀歲天后" (Soft Song Diva, New Year Princess, New Year Diva).

== Discography ==
=== Original songs ===
From the 歌坛小公主6 (Small Princess6 - Hokkien) album when she was 9 years old in 1990 -

- 妈妈在哪里 (Where's Mama?)

恋梦1: 少女之情怀 (The love feeling of a young girl - Hokkien) 1995 "Love Dream 1"

- 风(wind), 不应该的爱(shouldn't be in love), 阿娘的梦(mother's dream), 勤俭卡有底(work hard and save), 心惊惊(fear), 流浪儿(street boy), 不该来熟悉(shouldn't be acquainted), 浊水溪的恋情(romance by the muddy stream) (卓依婷 & 吴庆昌 Zhuo & Wu Qing-chang), 空杯(empty cup), 甭相辞(no need to say goodbye),秋风扫落叶(autumn wind sweeping falling leaves), 舞伴嘛是有知己(Dancing partner is friend) (卓依婷 & 吴庆昌 Zhuo & Wu Qing-chang)

恋梦2: "Love Dream 2" 伸手等你牵 (Stretch my hands waiting for you to hold - Hokkien) 1995

- 伸手等你牵(Stretch my hand waiting for you to hold), 愈想心肝愈呒甘(Bad feelings thinking of it), 心锁等你合(Waiting for you to comfort), 无情的班机(ruthless flight), 认真爱一人(love someone seriously), 请你呒通放舍我(don't leave me alone), 少女的恋梦(young girl's love dream), 伤心也好(even hurt is better), 爱情故事哪电影(the love story in the movie), 月娘可比阮心肝(The moon represents my heart), 爱阮有几分(how much do you love me), 留乎天安排 (let fate decides)

天使快醒来 (Wake Up, Angel): 伪装 2000

- 伪装(Camouflage), 离水之鱼(fish above water), 都依你(follow you), 天使快醒来(wake up, Angel), 从来都不知道(never know), 美人鱼(mermaid), 坏一点(a little bit naughty), 第一次失恋(separate with first lover), 夜舞(Dancing at the night), 悄悄话(intimate talk), 情比海更深(Love as deep as sea/deepest love),

蜕变5 (Transformation 5) "流星雨" (meteor shower) 2004

- 踏红尘(social life), 流星雨 (meteor shower), 爱你千万遍 (love you thousand times)

送你一个大年糕 (Give You a Big New Year Cake) Chinese New Year album 2005

- 送你一个大年糕 (Give You a Big New Year Cake)

我的眼泪不为你说谎 (My Tears Don't Lie to You) 2007

- 我的眼泪不为你说谎 (My Tears Don't Lie to You)

恭喜发财 (Gong Xi Fa Cai - Happy Prosperity) 2007

- 小小贺年片 (a little CNY greeting card), 日进千乡万里财 (make good money daily), 情人拜年 (lover's CNY greeting),好春天(Good Spring) 2008

卓依婷同名專輯 (Timi Zhuo same name album) 2011

- 全部原唱- 卓依婷填詞 (Zhuo is the original singer of all songs in this album. Lyrics of some songs in this album are written by Zhuo herself)

Most popular songs in this album - Thank you for continue loving me (謝謝你一直愛着我), Dream is ahead/Hope is ahead (夢想在前方).

- HELLO, 悄悄話(Intimate talk), 外貌恊會(Match the outlook), 明月(Bright moon), 永遠在我心中(Always in my heart), 舞念(Think of Dancing), 不是你情人(Not your lover), 眼淚不聽話(Tears don't listen/Can't stop crying), 謝謝你一直愛着我(Thank you for continue loving me), 小小幸福(little happiness), 夢想在前方(Dream is ahead/Hope is ahead).

This song wasn't recorded in an album, but she sang it on her 2007 concert.

- 别怕 (Don't be afraid)

Unreleased song:

- 關懷 (Concern)

=== Cover versions ===
This song was not recorded in an album, but she sang it on her 2011 concert.

- 愛與痛的邊緣 (Cantonese; originally sung by Faye Wong) - This song is the same melody as Zhuo's Mandarin song 有多少愛可以重來.

She also sang two other Cantonese songs in her separate album released in 2002 and 2008.

- 祝壽歌 (Happy Birthday) in her 2002 祝福2 (Blessing 2) album. (This song was originally sung by Samuel Hui of Hong Kong)
- 迎春花 (Spring flower) in her 2008 好春天 (Good Spring) album. (This is a classical Cantonese song used to celebrate Chinese New Year)

These three songs were not recorded in album, but she sang them in a television show named "China musical history in 100 years (中国百年音乐话史)" on CCTV4 channel in China.

- 四季歌 ("Song of four seasons" originally sung by Zhou Xuan in the 1950)
- 天涯歌女("Travel female singer" originally sung by Zhou Xuan in the 1950)
- 漁光曲 ("Song of fishing boat light" originally sung by Guan Mucun in the 1930)

Zhuo is famous for her Chinese New Year songs, and for Chinese opera songs such as "Liang San Bo Yu Zhu Ying Tai" (梁山伯与祝英台) from The Butterfly Lovers.

Her cover versions of Teresa Teng's songs are also very popular, including:

- 甜蜜蜜 "Sweet Honey" (from the album 怀念邓丽君金曲)
- 路边的野花不要采 "Don't Pick the Roadside Flowers" (from the 黄梅戏经典·小调重唱 album)
- 海韵 "Rhyme of the Sea" (from the album 怀念邓丽君金曲)
- 千言万语 "Endless Words" (from the 校园青春乐 2 album)
- 我只在乎你 "I Only Care About You" (from the album 怀念邓丽君金曲 & 款款柔情甜歌集 2 )
- 小城故事 "Small Town Story" (from the 校园青春乐 2 and 春风舞曲 album)
- 恰似你的温柔 "Like Your Tenderness" (from the album 怀念邓丽君金曲 & 款款柔情甜歌集 2)
- 月亮代表我的心 "The Moon Represents My Heart" (from the album 怀念邓丽君金曲 & 款款柔情甜歌集 1)
- 再见我的爱人 "Good-bye, my love" (from the album 怀念邓丽君金曲)
- 你怎么说 "How would you say" (from the album 怀念邓丽君金曲 & 款款柔情甜歌集 2)
- 在水一方 "On the Water side" (from the album 怀念邓丽君金曲 & 皇牌影视金曲)
