= Haozhuang =

Haozhuang (郝庄) may refer to the following locations in China:

- Haozhuang, Lincheng County, town in Hebei
- Haozhuang, Taiyuan, town in Yingze District, Taiyuan, Shanxi
- Haozhuang Township, Hebei, in Wuji County
- Haozhuang Township, Shanxi, in Jiang County

== See also ==
- Hao (surname)
