= Cheng'an, Xinle =

Cheng'an 承安镇
- Town
- Location in Hebei
- Coordinates: 38°23′57″N 114°47′12″E
- Country: People's Republic of China
- Province: Hebei
- Prefecture-level city: Shijiazhuang
- County-level city: Xinle
- Village-level divisions: 29 villages
- Elevation: 73 m (240 ft)
- Time zone: UTC+8 (China Standard)
- Postal code: 050700
- Area code: 0311

Cheng'an (Chinese: 承安; pinyin: Chéng'ān) is a town under the administration of Xinle City in western Hebei province, China, located 11 kilometres (6.8 mi) northeast of downtown Xinle and served by China National Highway 107. As of 2011, it has 29 villages under its administration.

== See also ==
- List of township-level divisions of Hebei
