= Matoupu, Xinle =

Coordinates: 38.3198°N 114.7207°E

Matoupu 马头铺镇
- Town

Chinese transcription(s)
- Interactive map of Matoupu
- Country: China
- Province: Hebei
- Prefecture: Shijiazhuang
- County-level city: Xinle City
- Time zone: UTC+8 (China Standard Time)

Matoupu (Chinese: 马头铺镇) is a township-level division of Xinle City, Shijiazhuang, Hebei, China. The Shijiazhuang Zhengding International Airport is located next to the town.

== See also ==
- List of township-level divisions of Hebei
