= Beiwa Township =

Beiwa Township 北洼乡
- Township
- Location in Hebei
- Coordinates: 38°21′00″N 114°26′40″E
- Country: People's Republic of China
- Province: Hebei
- Prefecture-level city: Shijiazhuang
- County: Lingshou
- Village-level divisions: 9 villages
- Elevation: 109 m (358 ft)
- Time zone: UTC+8 (China Standard)
- Area code: 0311

Beiwa (Chinese: 北洼; pinyin: Běiwā) is a township of Lingshou County, Hebei province, China, located 8 kilometres (5.0 mi) north of the county seat and just east of G5 Beijing–Kunming Expressway. As of 2011, it had 9 villages under its administration.

== See also ==
- List of township-level divisions of Hebei
