= Changshou Subdistrict =

Changshou Subdistrict 长寿街道
- Subdistrict
- Location in Hebei
- Coordinates: 38°20′45″N 114°40′25″E
- Country: People's Republic of China
- Province: Hebei
- Prefecture-level city: Shijiazhuang
- County-level city: Xinle
- Village-level divisions: 10 residential communities 11 villages
- Elevation: 80 m (260 ft)
- Time zone: UTC+8 (China Standard)
- Postal code: 050700
- Area code: 0311

Changshou Subdistrict (simplified Chinese: 长寿街道; traditional Chinese: 長壽街道; pinyin: Chángshòu Jiēdào) is a subdistrict and the seat of Xinle City, Hebei, People's Republic of China. As of 2011, it has 10 residential communities (社区) and 1 village under its administration.

== See also ==
- List of township-level divisions of Hebei
