= Pengjiazhuang Hui Ethnic Township =

Coordinates: 38°22′24″N 114°45′20″E

Pengjiazhuang Hui Ethnic Township 彭家庄回族乡 پْعکِاجُوْا خُوِذُو سِیْا
- Ethnic Township

Chinese transcription(s)
- Interactive map of Pengjiazhuang Hui Ethnic Township
- Country: China
- Province: Hebei
- Prefecture: Shijiazhuang
- County-level city: Xinle City
- Time zone: UTC+8 (China Standard Time)

Pengjiazhuang Hui Ethnic Township (Chinese: 彭家庄回族乡; pinyin: Péngjiāzhuāng Huízú Xiāng; Xiao'erjing: پْعکِاجُوْا خُوِذُو سِیْا) is a township-level division of Xinle City, Shijiazhuang, Hebei, China.

== See also ==
- List of township-level divisions of Hebei
