= Gaotou Hui Ethnic Township =

Gaotou Hui Ethnic Township 高头回族乡 قَوْتِوْ خُوِذُو سِیْا
- Ethnic township
- Location in Hebei
- Coordinates: 38°07′27″N 114°52′12″E
- Country: People's Republic of China
- Province: Hebei
- Prefecture-level city: Shijiazhuang
- County: Wuji
- Village-level divisions: 15 villages
- Elevation: 55 m (180 ft)
- Time zone: UTC+8 (China Standard)
- Area code: 0311

Gaotou Hui Ethnic Township (simplified Chinese: 高头回族乡; traditional Chinese: 高頭回族鄉; pinyin: Gāotóu Huízú Xiāng; Xiao'erjing: قَوْتِوْ خُوِذُو سِیْا) is a township of Wuji County in southwestern Hebei province, China, located 11 kilometres (6.8 mi) southwest of the county seat. As of 2011, it has 15 villages under its administration.

== See also ==
- List of township-level divisions of Hebei
