= Tiegan =

Coordinates: 38.15357°N 115.32481°E

Tiegan 铁杆镇
- Town

Chinese transcription(s)
- Interactive map of Tiegan
- Country: China
- Province: Hebei
- Prefecture: Shijiazhuang
- County: Shenze County
- Time zone: UTC+8 (China Standard Time)

Tiegan (Chinese: 铁杆镇) is a township-level division of Shenze County, Shijiazhuang, Hebei, China.

== See also ==
- List of township-level divisions of Hebei
