= Beitanzhuang Township =

Beitanzhuang Township 北谭庄乡
- Township
- Location in Hebei
- Coordinates: 38°30′49″N 114°17′27″E
- Country: People's Republic of China
- Province: Hebei
- Prefecture-level city: Shijiazhuang
- County: Lingshou
- Village-level divisions: 12 villages
- Elevation: 173 m (568 ft)
- Time zone: UTC+8 (China Standard)
- Area code: 0311

Beitanzhuang Township (simplified Chinese: 北谭庄乡; traditional Chinese: 北譚莊鄉; pinyin: Běitánzhuāng Xiāng) is a township of Lingshou County, Shijiazhuang, Hebei province, China, located in the eastern foothills of the Taihang Mountains 24 kilometres (15 mi) northwest of the county seat. As of 2011, it had 12 villages under its administration.

== See also ==
- List of township-level divisions of Hebei
