= Qingtong =

Coordinates: 38.38256°N 114.35036°E

Qingtong 青同镇
- Town

Chinese transcription(s)
- Interactive map of Qingtong
- Country: China
- Province: Hebei
- Prefecture: Shijiazhuang
- County: Lingshou County
- Time zone: UTC+8 (China Standard Time)

Qingtong (Chinese: 青同镇) is a township-level division of Lingshou County, Shijiazhuang, Hebei, China.

== See also ==
- List of township-level divisions of Hebei
