= Huapi, Hebei =

Huapi 化皮镇
- Town
- Location in Hebei
- Coordinates: 38°18′47″N 114°33′27″E
- Country: People's Republic of China
- Province: Hebei
- Prefecture-level city: Shijiazhuang
- County: Xinle City
- Village-level divisions: 13 villages
- Elevation: 95 m (312 ft)
- Time zone: UTC+8 (China Standard)
- Area code: 0311

Huapi (Chinese: 化皮; pinyin: Huàpí) is a town of Xinle City in southwestern Hebei province, China, located 11 kilometres (6.8 mi) southwest of downtown Xinle. As of 2011, it has 13 villages under its administration.

== See also ==
- List of township-level divisions of Hebei
