= Milovan Minja Prelević =

Montenegrin footballer and coach (1970–2019)

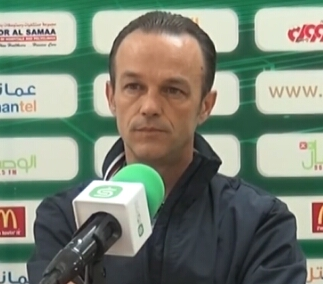
- Prelević in 2016

Personal information
- Full name: Milovan Minja Prelević
- Date of birth: 28 February 1970
- Place of birth: Podgorica, SR Montenegro, Yugoslavia
- Date of death: 1 August 2019 (aged 49)
- Place of death: Hangzhou, China

Youth career
- 1978–: Kom
- 1984–1988: Budućnost

Senior career*
Years	Team	Apps	(Gls)
1988-1990	OFK Beograd		

Managerial career
- 2003–2009: Budućnost (youth)
- 2009–2010: Petrovac
- 2011–2012: Kom
- 2012–2014: Mladost Podgorica
- 2015: Montenegro U19
- 2015: Hajer
- 2015–2016: Al-Oruba
- 2017–2018: Otrant
- 2018: Kom
- 2019: Hangzhou Wuyue Qiantang
- * Club domestic league appearances and goals

Milovan Minja Prelević (28 February 1970–1 August 2019) was a Montenegrin football coach and player.

Milovan's football career started in the FK Kom from Podgorica. Later on, he played in FK Crvena Stijena, FK Budućnost, OFK Belgrade and FK Obilić. Milovan played for the youth national team of Montenegro as well. He stopped with the active playing football quite early and became devoted to coaching instead. His coaching job starts at FK Budućnost. He also worked at OFK Petrovac, FK Kom, FK Mladost, Montenegro U-19 national team and Hajer FC. He was a coach with a UEFA PRO license and a lecturer at the UEFA school of coaches in Montenegro.

== Playing career ==
Milovan began to play football very early, at the age of 8 in the FK Kom. Quite soon, he shows his rich talent, speed and football intelligence. He went through all the younger selections of the Montenegro National Team, earning captain honours. Recommended by a number of goals he scored, Milovan begins to play for the younger selections FC Budućnost, the largest club in Montenegro, with which he signs his first professional contract. At the age of 19, he decides to move to OFK Belgrade. In Serbia, he also played for FK Obilić.

Under a variety of circumstances, Milovan decides to end his playing career at the age of 21. He then takes a break from football but returns after a call from FK Budućnost as the role of coach of youth teams.

== Coaching career ==
=== 2000-2009 ===
In 2000, he attended a coaching school in Niš (Serbia). He starts coaching in the FK Budućnost as a volunteer. He started to work independently in 2003. In the first year, he won his first trophy (Cadet Cup). In FK Budućnost, Milovan stays until 2009. During this time, he was the coach of all youth selections, which helped him to master the methodology of working with young players. He wins two championships and two Cups of Montenegro.

During this time in the Educational Center in Sarajevo, Bosnia and Herzegovina, Milovan receives UEFA A and UEFA PRO licenses. He graduated in 2010, and at that time, he was one of the few Montenegrin coaches with a UEFA PRO license.

=== 2009-2010 ===
In the season of 2009-2010, Milovan went over to OFK Petrovac in Montenegro as an assistant and a head coach. OFK Petrovac won the Cup of Montenegro and played in the third round of the Europa League (2nd-OFK Petrovac-Anorthosis 1–2, 3–1; 3rd-OFK Petrovac-Sturm 1–2, 0–5). This is the greatest achievement in the history of OFK Petrovac.

=== 2010-2011 ===
From 2010 to 2011, he leads B team FK Budućnost. From this selection, five players have become the first team players in FK Budućnost.

=== 2012-2014 ===
From 2012 to 2014, Milovan worked in OFK Mladost as an assistant and a head coach. FK Mladost played the Europa League and reached the third round (1st round, FK Mladost-Videoton 1–0,1-2; 2nd FK Mladost-Senica 2-2,1-0; 3rd FK Mladost-Sevilla 1 -6, 0–3). This is the greatest achievement in the club's history.

=== 2015-2016 ===
This year, Milovan begins as a coach of Montenegro U-19 selection, but during the summer, he receives a bid from Saudi club Hajer. In the FC Hajer, he has the role of an assistant coach in charge, responsible for, among many other things, football analysis.

Prelević joined the Omani club Al-Oruba SC in November 2015. His contract was ended shortly after due to poor results in January 2016.

=== 2017 ===
On July 3, 2017, FK Otrant announced Prelević as the new manager.

=== 2018 ===
In July 2018, Prelević returned to FK Kom.

=== 2019 ===
On January 9, 2019, China League Two club Hangzhou Wuyue Qiantang signed Prelević.

== Death ==
On August 1, 2019, Prelević died suddenly from a heart attack. According to the Hangzhou Wuyue Qiantang club administration's report, Prelević was absent as the team prepared their departure for a match, and was then found dead in his room.

== Coaching successes ==
The third round of the Europa League FK Mladost, as an assistant from 2012 to 2013

Winner Cup of Montenegro and the third round of the Europa League 2008 - 2009 - OFK Petrovac as an assistant

Titles in Championship and Cup-Montenegro in the junior categories:

- FK Budućnost - U19 Championship 2004-2005
- FK Budućnost - U17 Championship 2005-2006
- FK Budućnost - U15 Cup 2003-2004
- FK Budućnost - U14 Cup 2007-2008
