= Ciyu =

Ciyu 慈峪镇
- Town
- Location in Hebei
- Coordinates: 38°26′59″N 114°18′58″E
- Country: People's Republic of China
- Province: Hebei
- Prefecture-level city: Shijiazhuang
- County: Lingshou
- Village-level divisions: 33 villages
- Elevation: 149 m (489 ft)
- Time zone: UTC+8 (China Standard)
- Area code: 0311

Ciyu (Chinese: 慈峪; pinyin: Cíyù) is a town of Lingshou County in western Hebei province, China, located in the eastern foothills of the Taihang Mountains 17 kilometres (11 mi) north-northwest of the county seat. As of 2023, it has 33 villages under its administration:

- Ciyu Village
- Fengjiazhuang Village (冯家庄村)
- Longtiangou Village (龙田沟村)
- Xujiatuan Village (徐家疃村)
- Tutou Village (土头村)
- Liugou Village (柳沟村)
- Heishan Village (黑山村)
- Fenghuanglou Village (凤凰楼村)
- Shenjiazhuang Village (申家庄村)
- Dongjiazhuang Village (董家庄村)
- Yangjiayuan Village (杨家园村)
- Lujiawa Village (卢家洼村)
- Lingbei Village (岭北村)
- Nanwuhe Village (南伍河村)
- Beiwuhe Village (北伍河村)
- Zhongwuhe Village (中伍河村)
- Xiwuhe Village (西伍河村)
- Donghushe Village (东湖社村)
- Shangxiazhuang Village (上下庄村)
- Xibaishan Village (西柏山村)
- Dongbaishan Village (东柏山村)
- Haojiahe Village (郝家河村)
- Zhengyu Village (正峪村)
- Qiaotangyan Village (桥塘沿村)
- Dongliuzhuang Village (东刘庄村)
- Xiliuzhuang Village (西刘庄村)
- Sujiazhuang Village (苏家庄村)
- Yangjiazhuang Village (杨家庄村)
- Wanli Village (湾里村)
- Shikan Village (石坎村)
- Zhaili Village (寨里村)
- Hujiazhuang Village (胡家庄村)
- Liujiazhuang Village (柳家庄村)

== See also ==
- List of township-level divisions of Hebei
