= Donghoufang Township =

Donghoufang Township 东侯坊乡
- Township
- Location in Hebei
- Coordinates: 38°11′03″N 114°54′02″E
- Country: People's Republic of China
- Province: Hebei
- Prefecture-level city: Shijiazhuang
- County: Wuji
- Village-level divisions: 24 villages
- Elevation: 43 m (141 ft)
- Time zone: UTC+8 (China Standard)
- Postal code: 052260
- Area code: 0311

Donghoufang Township (simplified Chinese: 东侯坊乡; traditional Chinese: 東侯坊鄉; pinyin: Dōnghóufáng Xiāng) is a township of Wuji County in southwestern Hebei province, China, located adjacent to and west of the county seat. As of 2011, it has 24 villages under its administration.

== See also ==
- List of township-level divisions of Hebei
