= Xieshen Township =

Coordinates: 38°21′21″N 114°33′30″E

Xieshen Township 协神乡
- Township

Chinese transcription(s)
- Interactive map of Xieshen Township
- Country: China
- Province: Hebei
- Prefecture: Shijiazhuang
- County-level city: Xinle City
- Time zone: UTC+8 (China Standard Time)

Xieshen Township (Chinese: 协神乡) is a township-level division of Xinle City, Shijiazhuang, Hebei, China.

== See also ==
- List of township-level divisions of Hebei
