= Qiji, Wuji County =

Coordinates: 38.18334°N 115.0423°E

Qiji 七汲镇
- Town

Chinese transcription(s)
- Interactive map of Qiji
- Country: China
- Province: Hebei
- Prefecture: Shijiazhuang
- County: Wuji County
- Time zone: UTC+8 (China Standard Time)

Qiji (Chinese: 七汲镇) is a township-level division of Wuji County, Shijiazhuang, Hebei, China.

== See also ==
- List of township-level divisions of Hebei
