= Guozhuang, Wuji County =

Guozhuang 郭庄镇
- Town
- Location in Hebei
- Coordinates: 38°12′49″N 114°52′01″E
- Country: People's Republic of China
- Province: Hebei
- Prefecture-level city: Shijiazhuang
- County: Wuji
- Village-level divisions: 24 villages
- Elevation: 56 m (184 ft)
- Time zone: UTC+8 (China Standard)
- Area code: 0311

Guozhuang (simplified Chinese: 郭庄; traditional Chinese: 郭莊; pinyin: Guōzhuāng) is a town of Wuji County in southwestern Hebei province, China, located 10 kilometres (6.2 mi) northwest of the county seat. As of 2011, it has 24 villages under its administration.

== See also ==
- List of township-level divisions of Hebei
