= Niucheng Township =

Coordinates: 38.27337°N 114.3032°E

Niucheng Township 牛城乡
- Township

Chinese transcription(s)
- Interactive map of Niucheng Township
- Country: China
- Province: Hebei
- Prefecture: Shijiazhuang
- County: Lingshou County
- Time zone: UTC+8 (China Standard Time)

Niucheng Township (Chinese: 牛城乡) is a township-level division of Lingshou County, Shijiazhuang, Hebei, China.

== See also ==
- List of township-level divisions of Hebei
