= Zhangduangu =

Coordinates: 38°08′N 114°56′E

Zhangduangu 张段固镇
- Town

Chinese transcription(s)
- Interactive map of Zhangduangu
- Country: China
- Province: Hebei
- Prefecture: Shijiazhuang
- County: Wuji County
- Time zone: UTC+8 (China Standard Time)

Zhangduangu (Chinese: 张段固镇) is a township-level division of Wuji County, Shijiazhuang, Hebei, China.

== See also ==
- List of township-level divisions of Hebei
