= Dugu, Hebei =

Dugu 杜固镇
- Town
- Location in Hebei
- Coordinates: 38.39700°N 114.86623°E
- Country: People's Republic of China
- Province: Hebei
- Prefecture-level city: Shijiazhuang
- County-level city: Xinle
- Village-level divisions: 14 villages
- Elevation: 63 m (207 ft)
- Time zone: UTC+8 (China Standard)
- Area code: 0311

Dugu (Chinese: 杜固; pinyin: Dùgù) is a town of Xinle City in western Hebei province, China, located 17 kilometres (11 mi) northeast of downtown Xinle. As of 2018, it has 14 villages under its administration.

== See also ==
- List of township-level divisions of Hebei
