= Hangzhou Qiantang F.C. =

Chinese association football club

- Full name: Hangzhou Qiantang Football Club 杭州钱唐足球俱乐部
- Founded: 14 March 2017; 9 years ago
- League: Zhejiang Super League Division A
- 2024: Zhejiang Super League Division A, 4th of 9

Hangzhou Qiantang Football Club (Chinese: 杭州钱唐足球俱乐部) is a Chinese semi-professional football club based in Hangzhou, Zhejiang. In addition to competing in Zhejiang Super League Division A, the fifth tier of Chinese football, the club also organises a futsal section, and competes in the CFA Futsal Super League.

== History ==
The club was created as a result of a collaboration between three local amateur football clubs in Hangzhou: Hangzhou Ange, Hangzhou Qimeng and Hangzhou T60 in 2017, its name derived from the historical kingdom of Wuyue that Hangzhou was once the capital of, as well as the historical name of the city, Qiantang.

In 2018, the team qualified for the play-off stage of 2018 Chinese Champions League. After beating Shenzhen Xinqiao and Shanxi Metropolis in the play-offs, the club advanced to the semi-finals, securing a spot in the final four of the highest level of Chinese amateur football, and gaining promotion to China League Two. Although their promotion was denied at first, they were finally granted a last-minute admission into 2019 China League Two after the dissolution of Yanbian Funde in China League One and the subsequent promotion of Shaanxi Chang'an Athletic, securing its final spot.

Before the 2020 season, the club withdrew from China League Two.

== Name changes ==
- 2017–2020 Hangzhou Wuyue Qiantang F.C. 杭州吴越钱唐
- 2020– Hangzhou Qiantang F.C. 杭州钱唐

== Managerial history ==
- (China) Gu Zhongqing (2017–2018)
- (Montenegro) Milovan Prelević (2019) (Deceased)

== Results ==
All-time league rankings

As of the end of 2019 season.

Year	Div	Pld	W	D	L	GF	GA	GD	Pts	Pos.	FA Cup	Super Cup	AFC	Att./G	Stadium
2017	4									R2	R1	DNQ	DNQ		
2018	4									4	R1	DNQ	DNQ		
2019	3	30	10	4	16	38	55	-17	34^{1}	21	R1	DNQ	DNQ		

- ^1 In group stage.

Key

	China top division
	China second division
	China third division
	China fourth division
W	Winners
RU	Runners-up
3	Third place
	Relegated

- Pld = Played
- W = Games won
- D = Games drawn
- L = Games lost
- F = Goals for
- A = Goals against
- Pts = Points
- Pos = Final position
- DNQ = Did not qualify
- DNE = Did not enter
- NH = Not Held
- WD = Withdrawal
- – = Does Not Exist
- R1 = Round 1
- R2 = Round 2
- R3 = Round 3
- R4 = Round 4
- F = Final
- SF = Semi-finals
- QF = Quarter-finals
- R16 = Round of 16
- Group = Group stage
- GS2 = Second Group stage
- QR1 = First Qualifying Round
- QR2 = Second Qualifying Round
- QR3 = Third Qualifying Round
