= Peng Hao (footballer, born 1993) =

Chinese association football player

Personal information
- Date of birth: 18 October 1993 (age 33)
- Place of birth: Luotian County, Hubei, China
- Height: 1.92 m (6 ft 4 in)
- Position: Goalkeeper

Team information
- Current team: Jiangxi Beidamen
- Number: 1

Youth career
- –2014: Hangzhou Greentown

Senior career*
Years	Team	Apps	(Gls)
2015–2017	Hangzhou Wuyue Qiantang		
2018–2022	Jiangxi Beidamen	70	(0)
2024	Xiamen 1026	7	(0)
Total		77	(0)
- * Club domestic league appearances and goals as of 8 September 2024

Peng Hao (Chinese: 彭浩; born 18 October 1993) is a Chinese footballer currently playing as a goalkeeper for Jiangxi Beidamen.

On 10 September 2024, Chinese Football Association announced that Peng was banned from football-related activities for lifetime for involving in match-fixing.

== Career statistics ==
=== Club ===
As of 8 September 2024.

Club	Season	League			Cup		Other		Total	
Club	Season	Division	Apps	Goals	Apps	Goals	Apps	Goals	Apps	Goals
Jiangxi Liansheng/ Jiangxi Beidamen	2018	China League Two	21	0	0	0	0	0	21	0
Jiangxi Liansheng/ Jiangxi Beidamen	2019	China League Two	24	0	0	0	1 (Note: Appearances in the China League Two playoffs)	0	25	0
Jiangxi Liansheng/ Jiangxi Beidamen	2021	China League One	2	0	1 (Note: Appearances in the Chinese FA Cup)	0	—		3	0
Jiangxi Liansheng/ Jiangxi Beidamen	2022	China League One	23	0	2	0	—		25	0
Jiangxi Liansheng/ Jiangxi Beidamen	Total		70	0	3	0	1	0	74	0
Xiamen 1026	2024	Chinese Champions League	7	0	—		—		7	0
Career total			77	0	3	0	1	0	81	0
