= Shenze, Hebei =

Shenze 深泽镇
- Town
- Interactive map of Shenze
- Coordinates: 38°11′04″N 115°12′03″E
- Country: People's Republic of China
- Province: Hebei
- Prefecture-level city: Shijiazhuang
- County: Shenze
- Elevation: 41 m (135 ft)
- Time zone: UTC+8 (China Standard Time)

Shenze (simplified Chinese: 深泽; traditional Chinese: 深澤; pinyin: shēn zé) is a town in and the seat of Shenze County, in southwestern Hebei province, China, about 60 km (37 mi) east-northeast of the provincial capital of Shijiazhuang. As of 2011, it has 26 villages under its administration.

== See also ==
- List of township-level divisions of Hebei
