= Baizhuang Township =

Baizhuang Township 白庄乡
- Township
- Location in Hebei
- Coordinates: 38°16′04″N 115°14′06″E
- Country: People's Republic of China
- Province: Hebei
- Prefecture-level city: Shijiazhuang
- County: Shenze
- Village-level divisions: 18 villages

Area
  - Total: 57.7 km^{2} (22.3 sq mi)
- Elevation: 36 m (118 ft)

Population (2004)
  - Total: 44,736
- Time zone: UTC+8 (China Standard)
- Postal code: 052560
- Area code: 0311

Baizhuang Township (simplified Chinese: 白庄乡; traditional Chinese: 白莊鄉; pinyin: Báizhuāng Xiāng) is a township of Shenze County, Hebei, China.

By road, the township is located 12.1 kilometres (7.5 mi) northeast of the county seat and 87.1 km (54.1 mi) northeast of Shijiazhuang.

The township covers an area of 57.7 km^{2} (22.3 sq mi) and had a population of 44,736 in 2004.

== Administrative divisions ==
The township contains the following villages:

- Guzhuang Village (孤庄村委会)
- Nanbaizhuang Village (南白庄村委会)
- Zhongbaizhuang Village (中白庄村委会)
- Beibaizhuang Village (北白庄村委会)
- Xiaozhiyao Village (小直要村委会)
- Gaomiao Village (高庙村委会)
- Dazhiyao Village (大直要村委会)
- Nanzhangzhuang Village (南张庄村委会)
- Xiaobao Village (小堡村委会)
- Dabao Village (大堡村委会)
- Zaoying Village (枣营村委会)
- Xiguluo Village (西古罗村委会)
- Dongguluo Village (东古罗村委会)
- Wangjiazhuang Village (王家庄村委会)
- Duanzhuang Village (段庄村委会)
- Nanying Village (南营村委会)
- Beiye Zhuangtou Village (北冶庄头村委会)
- Songjiazhuang Village (宋家庄村委会)

== See also ==
- List of township-level divisions of Hebei
