= List of Hong Kong, Macau and Taiwanese players in Chinese football leagues =

This list consists of Hong Kong, Macau and Taiwanese players in Chinese football leagues.

== Policies ==
Policy for Hong Kong, Macau and Taiwanese players has changed continually. Players from Hong Kong Football Association were considered foreigners at the beginning of 2009, but the league held back the change until the summer transfer window. After the 2010 season, players from Macau Football Association and Chinese Taipei Football Association (except goalkeepers) were not considered foreigners in CSL matches, but will be regarded as foreigners in AFC competitions. In the 2015 season, players who had not played for the Hong Kong national football team, Macau national football team or the Chinese Taipei national football team were no longer deemed native players. In the 2016 and 2017 season, players from the three associations whose contract was signed after 1 January 2016 were no longer deemed native players. From the 2018 season, a club could register one non-naturalized player from the three associations as a native player. According to the Chinese FA, a non-naturalized player refers to someone who was first registered as a professional footballer in the three football associations. Furthermore, Hong Kong or Macau players must be of Chinese descent of Hong Kong or Macau permanent resident, and Taiwanese players must be citizens of Taiwan.

== List of players ==
Currently playing in mainland China.

=== Hong Kong ===
Player	Chinese name	Birthdate	Second association	Years	Team	Apps (Gls)
Ng Wai Chiu	吳偉超	22 October 1981		2001; 2002-2003; 2004-2005; 2005; 2006-2008; 2009-2010; 2013-2016	Guangdong Mingfeng; Guangzhou Xiangxue; Nanjing Yoyo; Shanghai Zobon (loan); Shanghai Shenhua; Hangzhou Greentown; Tianjin Quanjian	35 (1); 27 (2); 23 (1); 38 (1); 34 (0); 67 (4)
Andy Nägelein	聶凌峰	5 October 1981	Germany	2010-2011; 2013; 2014	Shenzhen Ruby; Guizhou Zhicheng; Hunan Billows	40 (0); 11 (4); 19 (1)
Chan Siu Ki	陳肇麒	14 July 1985		2012-2013	Guangdong Sunray Cave	38 (10)
Leung Chun Pong	梁振邦	1 October 1986		2012-2013	Guangdong Sunray Cave	33 (5)
Godfred Karikari	高梵·卡里卡利	11 March 1985	Ghana	2012-2013; 2014; 2014-2015; 2016-2017	Henan Jianye; Shenzhen Ruby; Beijing Baxy; Qingdao Huanghai	16 (1); 5 (1); 35 (6); 45 (5)
Wisdom Fofo Agbo	福福	25 June 1979	Ghana	2013-2014; 2015	Harbin Yiteng; Liaoning Whowin	26 (0); 0 (0)
Lee Chi Ho	李志豪	16 October 1982		2013-2014; 2016-2017	Beijing Guoan; Meizhou Hakka	0 (0); 34 (0)
Fong Pak Lun	方柏倫	14 April 1993		2014	Shenyang Zhongze	4 (0)
Li Ngai Hoi	李毅凱	15 October 1994		2014; 2021-2023	Shenyang Zhongze; Nantong Zhiyun	0 (0); 39 (1)
Bai He	白鶴	19 November 1983	China	2014-2015	Shijiazhuang Ever Bright	41 (1)
Brian Fok	霍斌仁	8 March 1994	Nigeria	2014-2019	Shanghai Shenhua	0 (0)
Jack Sealy	積施利	4 May 1987	England	2016-2017	Changchun Yatai	9 (0)
Itaparica	伊達	8 July 1980	Brazil	2016	Xinjiang Tianshan Leopard	27 (7)
Festus Baise	法圖斯	11 April 1980	Nigeria	2016-2019	Guizhou Hengfeng	87 (10)
Jean-Jacques Kilama	基藍馬	13 October 1985	Cameroon	2016-2017	Tianjin Quanjian	7 (0)
Paulinho	福保羅	16 January 1983	Brazil	2016-2017	Shenzhen	4 (0)
Au Yeung Yiu Chung	歐陽耀冲	11 July 1989		2016-2018	Guizhou Zhicheng	2 (0)
Alex Tayo Akande	艾力士	7 February 1989	Nigeria	2018; 2019-2021; 2023	Yanbian Funde; Dalian Pro; Shanghai Jiading Huilong	16 (2); 3 (0); 5 (0)
Paul Ngue	基奧	2 February 1988	Cameroon	2018	Xinjiang Tianshan Leopard	13 (3)
Andy Russell	羅素	21 November 1987	England	2018; 2019-2020; 2020-2021	Liaoning Whowin; Hebei China Fortune; Jiangxi Lushan F.C. Sichuan Jiuniu	27 (4); 6 (0); 44 (3); 19 (0)
Tan Chun Lok	陳俊樂	15 January 1996		2018-2022	Guangzhou R&F	3 (0)
Tsui Wang Kit	徐宏傑	5 January 1997		2018-2020; 2024-	Meizhou Hakka; Yunnan Yukun	36 (0); 17 (3)
Leung Nok Hang	梁諾恆	14 November 1994		2020; 2021-	Meizhou Hakka; Zhejiang Pro	15 (3); 80 (5)
Vas Nuñez	勞烈斯	22 November 1995	Mexico	2021-2022; 2022-	Meizhou Hakka; Dalian Pro	36 (0); 26 (0)
Matt Orr	安永佳	1 January 1997	New Zealand	2022-	Guangxi Pingguo Haliao	37 (17)
Yue Tze Nam	茹子楠	12 May 1998		2022-	Meizhou Hakka	35 (3)
Clement Benhaddouche	賓紀文	11 May 1996	France	2023; 2024; 2025	Heilongjiang Ice City; Suzhou Dongwu; Shenzhen Juniors	8 (1); 11 (0); 0 (0)
Remi Dujardin	杜國瑜	23 June 1997	France	2023	Dandong Tengyue	8 (0)

=== Taiwan (Chinese Taipei) ===
Player	Chinese name	Birthdate	Second association	Years	Team	Apps (Gls)
Chen Hao-wei	陳浩瑋	30 April 1992		2012-2018; 2023-	Beijing Enterprises Group; Dongguan United	73 (9); 9 (2)
Chen Po-liang	陳柏良	11 August 1988		2012-2013; 2014; 2015-2020; 2020-2022; 2022-	Shenzhen Ruby; Shanghai Shenhua; Zhejiang Greentown; Changchun Yatai; Qingdao West Coast	4 (1); 14 (1); 133 (12); 24 (2); 51 (6)
Xavier Chen	陳昌源	15 October 1983	Belgium	2013-2015	Guizhou Renhe	75 (2)
Lin Yueh-han	林約翰	16 January 1993		2013	Beijing Baxy	0 (0)
Wen Chih-hao	溫智豪	25 March 1993		2013-2022	Beijing BSU	164 (21)
Chen Wei-chuan	陳威全	29 August 1992		2015	Hunan Billows	0 (0)
Chen Chao-an	陳昭安	22 June 1995		2015-2016	Hunan Billows	13 (0)
Ko Yu-ting	柯昱廷	18 January 1994		2015-2017	Changchun Yatai	0 (0)
Onur Dogan	朱恩樂	5 September 1987	Turkey	2016-2018	Meizhou Hakka	48 (9)
Yaki Yen	殷亞吉	21 April 1989	Spain	2016-2018; 2018-2021; 2021-2023; 2023; 2024	Changchun Yatai; Qingdao F.C. Wuhan Three Towns; Nanjing City; Chongqing Tonglianglong	23 (0); 62 (5); 48 (1); 17 (0); 21 (1)
Tim Chow	周定洋	18 January 1994	England	2019-2022; 2022-	Henan Jianye; Chengdu Rongcheng	56 (2); 52 (6)
Wang Chien-ming	王建明	4 July 1993	South Korea	2020-2022; 2022-	Shaanxi Chang'an Athletic; Qingdao Hainiu	56 (4); 45 (2)
Will Donkin	沈子貴	26 December 2000	England	2022-	Shenzhen F.C.	22 (1)
Wu Yen-Shu	吳彥澍	21 October 1999		2023-	Liaoning Shenyang Urban	10 (0)

=== Macau ===
As of now, no Macanese player has joined any mainland team in the Chinese football leagues. However, in 2018, a Macanese football team which is called MFA Development participated in the 2018 Chinese Champions League though by league rules, they were not permitted to gain promotion.
