= Dachen, Hebei =

Dachen 大陈镇
- Town
- Location in Hebei
- Coordinates: 38°14′44″N 115°01′19″E
- Country: People's Republic of China
- Province: Hebei
- Prefecture-level city: Shijiazhuang
- County: Wuji
- Village-level divisions: 13 villages
- Elevation: 46 m (151 ft)
- Time zone: UTC+8 (China Standard)
- Postal code: 073009
- Area code: 0311

Dachen (simplified Chinese: 大陈; traditional Chinese: 大陳; pinyin: Dàchén) is a town of Wuji County in west-central Hebei province, China, located about 8 kilometres (5.0 mi) northeast of the county seat. As of 2011, it has 13 villages under its administration.

== See also ==
- List of township-level divisions of Hebei
