= Tashang =

Coordinates: 38°23′42″N 114°12′20″E

Tashang 塔上镇
- Town

Chinese transcription(s)
- Interactive map of Tashang
- Country: China
- Province: Hebei
- Prefecture: Shijiazhuang
- County: Lingshou County
- Time zone: UTC+8 (China Standard Time)

Tashang (Chinese: 塔上镇) is a township-level division of Lingshou County, Shijiazhuang, Hebei, China.

== See also ==
- List of township-level divisions of Hebei
