= Nanliu Township =

Coordinates: 38.23344°N 115.08482°E

Nanliu Township 南流乡
- Township

Chinese transcription(s)
- Interactive map of Nanliu Township
- Country: China
- Province: Hebei
- Prefecture: Shijiazhuang
- County: Wuji County
- Time zone: UTC+8 (China Standard Time)

Nanliu Township (Chinese: 南流乡) is a township-level division of Wuji County, Shijiazhuang, Hebei, China.

== See also ==
- List of township-level divisions of Hebei
