= Dongwang, Xinle =

Dongwang 东王镇
- Town
- Location in Hebei
- Coordinates: 38°19′27″N 114°53′31″E
- Country: People's Republic of China
- Province: Hebei
- Prefecture-level city: Shijiazhuang
- County-level city: Xinle
- Village-level divisions: 10 villages
- Elevation: 56 m (184 ft)
- Time zone: UTC+8 (China Standard)
- Website: 0311

Dongwang (simplified Chinese: 东王; traditional Chinese: 東王; pinyin: Dōngwáng) is a town under the administration of Xinle City, in southwestern Hebei province, China, located approximately 19 kilometres (12 mi) east of downtown Xinle. As of 2011, it has 10 residential communities (社区) under its administration.

== See also ==
- List of township-level divisions of Hebei
