= Liucun Township, Hebei =

Liucun Township 留村乡
- Township
- Location in Hebei
- Coordinates: 38°12′42″N 115°10′23″E
- Country: People's Republic of China
- Province: Hebei
- Prefecture-level city: Shijiazhuang
- County: Shenze County
- Village-level divisions: 15 villages
- Elevation: 39 m (128 ft)
- Time zone: UTC+8 (China Standard)
- Postal code: 052560
- Area code: 0311

Liucun Township (Chinese: 留村乡; pinyin: Liúcūn Xiāng) is a township of Shenze County in southern Hebei province, China, located adjacent to and northwest of the county seat. As of 2020, it has 15 villages under its administration:

- Dongnanliu Village (东南留村)
- Xinanliu Village (西南留村)
- Dongbeiliu Village (东北留村)
- Xibeiliu Village (西北留村)
- Liuwangzhuang Village (留王庄村)
- Jiahe Village (夹河村)
- Dajiazhuang Village (大贾庄村)
- Lijiazhuang Village (李家庄村)
- Beizhaozhuang Village (北赵庄村)
- Zhifang Village (纸房村)
- Xineipu Village (西内堡村)
- Nanneipu Village (南内堡村)
- Beiyang Village (北羊村)
- Yang Village (羊村)
- Jia Village (贾村)

== See also ==
- List of township-level divisions of Hebei
