= Sanshengyuan Township =

Coordinates: 38°17′02″N 114°25′55″E

Sanshengyuan Township 三圣院乡
- Township

Chinese transcription(s)
- Interactive map of Sanshengyuan Township
- Country: China
- Province: Hebei
- Prefecture: Shijiazhuang
- County: Lingshou County
- Time zone: UTC+8 (China Standard Time)

Sanshengyuan Township (Chinese: 三圣院乡) is a township-level division of Lingshou County, Shijiazhuang, Hebei, China.

== See also ==
- List of township-level divisions of Hebei
