= Goutai Township =

Goutai Township 狗台乡
- Township
- Location in Hebei
- Coordinates: 38°19′47″N 114°19′13″E
- Country: People's Republic of China
- Province: Hebei
- Prefecture-level city: Shijiazhuang
- County: Lingshou
- Village-level divisions: 23 villages
- Elevation: 121 m (397 ft)
- Time zone: UTC+8 (China Standard)
- Area code: 0311

Goutai (Chinese: 狗台; pinyin: Gǒutái) is a township of Lingshou County in southwestern Hebei province, China, located 4 to 5 kilometres (2.5 to 3.1 mi) northwest of the county seat in the eastern foothills of the Taihang Mountains. As of 2011, it has 23 villages under its administration.

== See also ==
- List of township-level divisions of Hebei
