= Lichengdao Township =

Lichengdao Township 里城道乡
- Township
- Location in Hebei
- Coordinates: 38°14′14″N 114°55′38″E
- Country: People's Republic of China
- Province: Hebei
- Prefecture-level city: Shijiazhuang
- County: Wuji
- Village-level divisions: 23 villages
- Elevation: 48 m (157 ft)
- Time zone: UTC+8 (China Standard)
- Postal code: 073009
- Area code: 0311

Lichengdao (Chinese: 里城道; pinyin: Lǐchéngdào) is a township of Wuji County in southwestern Hebei province, China, located about 8 kilometres (5.0 mi) northwest of the county seat. As of 2011, it has 23 villages under its administration.

== See also ==
- List of township-level divisions of Hebei
