= Zhaitou Township =

Coordinates: 38°34′07″N 114°01′41″E

Zhaitou Township 寨头乡
- Township

Chinese transcription(s)
- Interactive map of Zhaitou Township
- Country: China
- Province: Hebei
- Prefecture: Shijiazhuang
- County: Lingshou County
- Time zone: UTC+8 (China Standard Time)

Zhaitou Township (Chinese: 寨头乡) is a township-level division of Lingshou County, Shijiazhuang, Hebei, China.

== See also ==
- List of township-level divisions of Hebei
