= Wuji County =

Wuji County 无极县
- County
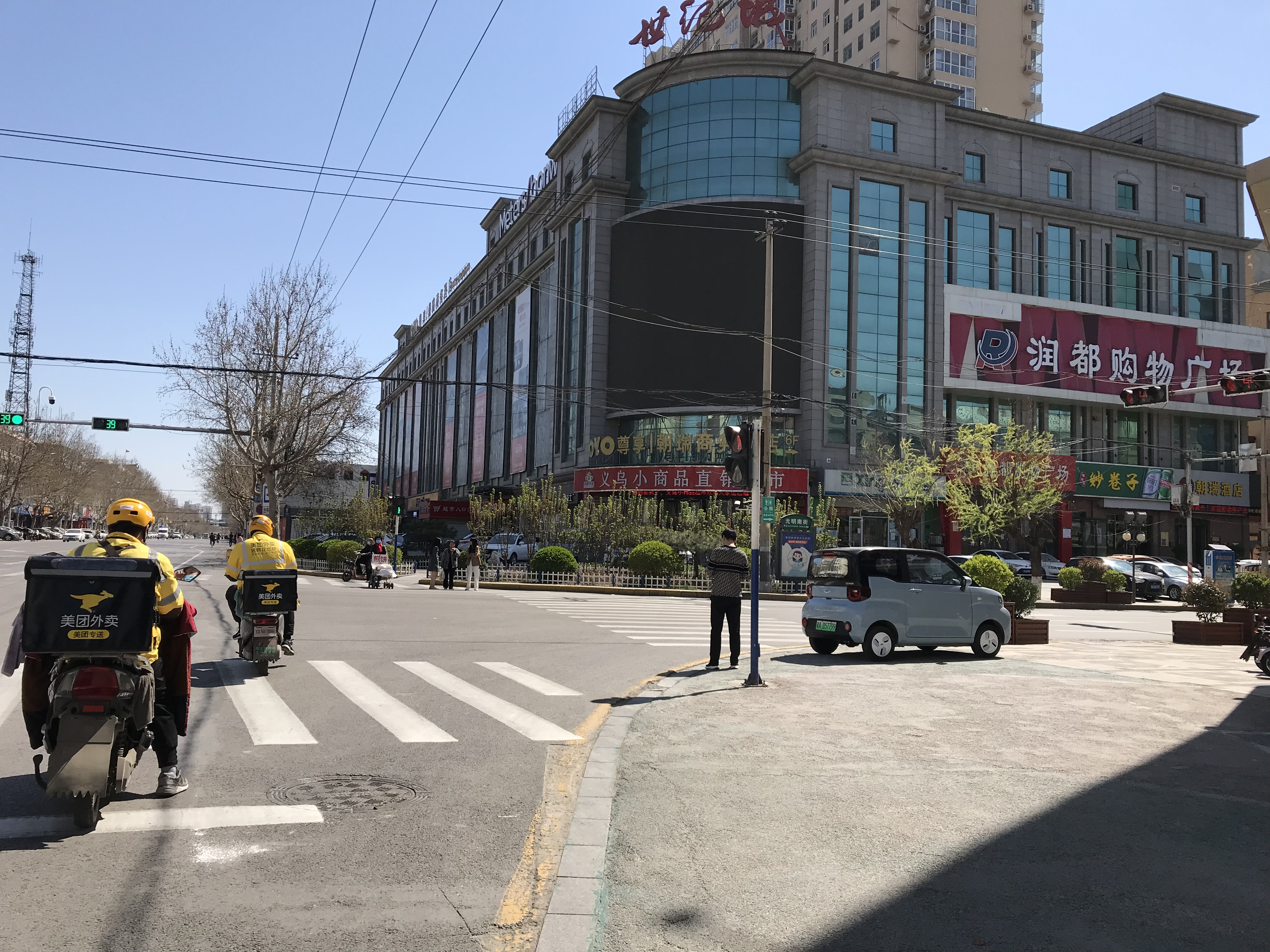

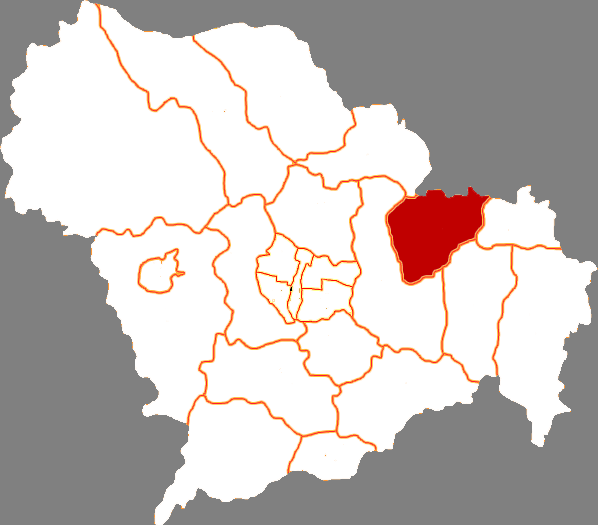
- Location in Hebei
- Coordinates: 38°10′44″N 114°58′34″E
- Country: People's Republic of China
- Province: Hebei
- Prefecture-level city: Shijiazhuang
- Seat: Wuji Town (无极镇)

Area
  - Total: 524 km^{2} (202 sq mi)

Population (2020 census)
  - Total: 451,377
  - Density: 861/km^{2} (2,230/sq mi)
- Time zone: UTC+8 (China Standard)
- Postal code: 052460
- Area code: 0311
- Website: http://www.wuji.gov.cn/

Wuji County (simplified Chinese: 无极县; traditional Chinese: 無極縣; pinyin: Wújí Xiàn; lit. 'Limitless') is a county of Hebei Province, North China, under the administration of the prefecture-level city of Shijiazhuang, the provincial capital. The county covers an area of 524 km^{2} (202 sq mi), and had a population of 451,377 (as of 2020). Wuji County has 6 towns, 4 townships and 1 Hui autonomous township, total 213 villages. It borders Shenze County to the east, Gaocheng District to the west and southwest, Dingzhou City to the north, and Jinzhou City to the southeast.

== Administrative divisions ==
Name	Chinese	Area (km^{2})	Population	Villages
Wuji Town	无极镇	57	76,851	25
Qiji Town	七汲镇	54	41,584	20
Zhangduangu Town	张段固镇	51	40,916	20
Beisu Town	北苏镇	54	54,639	18
Guozhuang Town	郭庄镇	43	43,636	23
Dachen Town	大陈镇	42	31,297	13
Haozhuang Township	郝庄乡	55	37,786	19
Donghoufang Township	东侯坊乡	56	48,665	24
Lichengdao Township	里城道乡	44	40,411	19
Nanliu Township	南流乡	30	24,802	12
Gaotou Hui Autonomous Township	高头回族乡	32	33,722	15

Wuji County is a county under the jurisdiction of Shijiazhuang City, Hebei Province, People's Republic of China. It covers an area of 524 square kilometers, has 213 administrative villages, and has a population of 530,000. It is located in the northeast of Shijiazhuang and the lower reaches of the Hutuo River. Futuo River is located in the southern part of the county and is the boundary river between Wuji, Jinzhou City, and Gaocheng District. It was named Wuji in 697 AD (Wu Zetian period) and it is still in use today.

The leather processing industry is the largest pillar industry of Wuji; the pharmaceutical industry is one of Wuji's traditional industries, and the home furnishing industry is a new industry of Wuji.

The province is the largest greenhouse cucumber and leek production base in northern China.

The Wuji paper-cut was listed as the first batch of intangible cultural heritage by Hebei Province in 2006.

Promise specialties include Promise glutinous rice, Crock-stove biscuits, Promise grilled cakes, and so on.

== Climate ==
Climate data for Wuji, elevation 45 m (148 ft), (1991–2020 normals, extremes 1981–2010)
Month	Jan	Feb	Mar	Apr	May	Jun	Jul	Aug	Sep	Oct	Nov	Dec	Year
Record high °C (°F)	17.8 (64.0)	24.0 (75.2)	31.1 (88.0)	34.2 (93.6)	39.2 (102.6)	41.0 (105.8)	41.6 (106.9)	37.1 (98.8)	37.2 (99.0)	32.3 (90.1)	25.6 (78.1)	19.6 (67.3)	41.6 (106.9)
Mean daily maximum °C (°F)	3.2 (37.8)	7.5 (45.5)	14.6 (58.3)	21.8 (71.2)	27.4 (81.3)	32.2 (90.0)	32.5 (90.5)	30.8 (87.4)	27.0 (80.6)	20.7 (69.3)	11.3 (52.3)	4.6 (40.3)	19.5 (67.0)
Daily mean °C (°F)	−2.9 (26.8)	1.0 (33.8)	7.9 (46.2)	15.1 (59.2)	21.0 (69.8)	26.0 (78.8)	27.4 (81.3)	25.7 (78.3)	21.0 (69.8)	14.3 (57.7)	5.4 (41.7)	−1.0 (30.2)	13.4 (56.1)
Mean daily minimum °C (°F)	−7.7 (18.1)	−4.1 (24.6)	2.0 (35.6)	8.8 (47.8)	14.5 (58.1)	19.9 (67.8)	22.9 (73.2)	21.5 (70.7)	15.9 (60.6)	9.0 (48.2)	1.0 (33.8)	−5.2 (22.6)	8.2 (46.8)
Record low °C (°F)	−21.4 (−6.5)	−18.4 (−1.1)	−10.3 (13.5)	−2.9 (26.8)	3.2 (37.8)	8.3 (46.9)	15.9 (60.6)	13.6 (56.5)	4.6 (40.3)	−3.5 (25.7)	−13.6 (7.5)	−23.4 (−10.1)	−23.4 (−10.1)
Average precipitation mm (inches)	2.0 (0.08)	4.5 (0.18)	8.5 (0.33)	26.9 (1.06)	35.0 (1.38)	49.9 (1.96)	136.9 (5.39)	114.9 (4.52)	48.9 (1.93)	23.3 (0.92)	13.4 (0.53)	2.7 (0.11)	466.9 (18.39)
Average precipitation days (≥ 0.1 mm)	1.5	2.4	2.5	4.9	6.2	8.4	11.6	10.2	6.9	4.9	3.7	1.9	65.1
Average snowy days	2.6	2.7	1.0	0.2	0	0	0	0	0	0	1.2	2.6	10.3
Average relative humidity (%)	58	54	50	56	60	60	73	78	72	66	67	63	63
Mean monthly sunshine hours	144.5	160.0	210.6	236.3	255.5	222.7	185.5	193.3	186.8	180.5	149.8	146.2	2,271.7
Percentage possible sunshine	47	52	56	59	58	50	42	46	51	53	50	50	51
Source: China Meteorological Administration
