= Nandayue =

Coordinates: 38.47555°N 114.79409°E

Nandayue 南大岳镇
- Town

Chinese transcription(s)
- Interactive map of Nandayue
- Country: China
- Province: Hebei
- Prefecture: Shijiazhuang
- County-level city: Xinle City
- Time zone: UTC+8 (China Standard Time)

Nandayue (Chinese: 南大岳镇) is a township-level division of Xinle City, Shijiazhuang, Hebei, China.

== See also ==
- List of township-level divisions of Hebei
