= Zhaoba Township =

Coordinates: 38°11′22″N 115°08′01″E

Zhaoba Township 赵八乡
- Township

Chinese transcription(s)
- Interactive map of Zhaoba Township
- Country: China
- Province: Hebei
- Prefecture: Shijiazhuang
- County: Shenze County
- Time zone: UTC+8 (China Standard Time)

Zhaoba Township (Chinese: 赵八乡) is a township-level division of Shenze County, Shijiazhuang, Hebei, China.
