= Nanyanchuan Township =

Coordinates: 38.4756°N 114.23344°E

Nanyanchuan Township 南燕川乡
- Township

Chinese transcription(s)
- Interactive map of Nanyanchuan Township
- Country: China
- Province: Hebei
- Prefecture: Shijiazhuang
- County: Lingshou County
- Time zone: UTC+8 (China Standard Time)

Nanyanchuan Township (Chinese: 南燕川乡) is a township-level division of Lingshou County, Shijiazhuang, Hebei, China.

== See also ==
- List of township-level divisions of Hebei
