= Chatou, Hebei =

Chatou 岔头镇
- Town
- Location in Hebei
- Coordinates: 38°33′36″N 114°14′19″E
- Country: People's Republic of China
- Province: Hebei
- Prefecture-level city: Shijiazhuang
- County: Lingshou
- Village-level divisions: 18 villages
- Elevation: 195 m (640 ft)
- Time zone: UTC+8 (China Standard)
- Area code: 0311

Chatou (simplified Chinese: 岔头; traditional Chinese: 岔頭; pinyin: Chàtóu) is a town of Lingshou County in western Hebei province, China, located in the eastern foothills of Taihang Mountains about 31 kilometres (19 mi) northwest of the county seat. As of 2011, it has 18 villages under its administration.

== See also ==
- List of township-level divisions of Hebei
