= Zhengmo =

Coordinates: 38°28′05″N 114°44′02″E

Zhengmo 正莫镇
- Town

Chinese transcription(s)
- Interactive map of Zhengmo
- Country: China
- Province: Hebei
- Prefecture: Shijiazhuang
- County-level city: Xinle City
- Time zone: UTC+8 (China Standard Time)

Zhengmo (Chinese: 正莫镇) is a township-level division of Xinle City, Shijiazhuang, Hebei, China.

== See also ==
- List of township-level divisions of Hebei
