= Qiaotou Township, Shenze County =

Coordinates: 38.13792°N 115.24635°E

Qiaotou Township, Shenze County 桥头乡
- Township

Chinese transcription(s)
- Interactive map of Qiaotou Township, Shenze County
- Country: China
- Province: Hebei
- Prefecture: Shijiazhuang
- County: Shenze County
- Time zone: UTC+8 (China Standard Time)

Qiaotou Township, Shenze County (Chinese: 桥头乡) is a township-level division of Shenze County, Shijiazhuang, Hebei, China.

== See also ==
- List of township-level divisions of Hebei
