= Chenzhuang, Lingshou County =

Chenzhuang 陈庄镇
- Town
- Location in Hebei
- Coordinates: 38°34′08″N 114°06′02″E
- Country: People's Republic of China
- Province: Hebei
- Prefecture-level city: Shijiazhuang
- County: Lingshou
- Village-level divisions: 36 villages
- Elevation: 259 m (850 ft)
- Time zone: UTC+8 (China Standard)
- Area code: 0311

Chenzhuang (simplified Chinese: 陈庄; traditional Chinese: 陳莊; pinyin: Chénzhuāng) is a town of Lingshou County in western Hebei province, China, located in the Taihang Mountains 38 kilometres (24 mi) northwest of the county seat and served by China National Highway 207. As of 2011, it has 36 villages under its administration.

Chenzhuang is the site of a partially built amusement park called "Wonderland", whose construction was abandoned in 1998. The aim of the developers was to build the largest amusement park in Asia, but they ran into disagreements with the local government and the farmers over land prices. An attempt to restart the construction in 2008 proved unsuccessful.

== See also ==
- List of township-level divisions of Hebei
