= Haozhuang Township, Hebei =

Haozhuang Township 郝庄乡
- Township
- Location in Hebei
- Coordinates: 38°04′44″N 114°50′37″E
- Country: People's Republic of China
- Province: Hebei
- Prefecture-level city: Shijiazhuang
- County: Wuji
- Village-level divisions: 19 villages
- Elevation: 57 m (187 ft)
- Time zone: UTC+8 (China Standard)
- Area code: 0311

Haozhuang Township (simplified Chinese: 郝庄乡; traditional Chinese: 郝莊鄉; pinyin: Hǎozhuāng Xiāng) is a township of Wuji County in southwestern Hebei province, China, located 16 kilometres (9.9 mi) southwest of the county seat. As of 2011, it has 19 villages under its administration.

== See also ==
- List of township-level divisions of Hebei
