= Hangzhou Sinobal F.C. =

Chinese football club

Hangzhou Sinobal Football Club
- Full name: Hangzhou Sinobal Football Club 杭州赛搏足球俱乐部
- Nickname: Fighting Pandas (战斗熊猫)
- Founded: June 1998; 27 years ago (Semi-professional)
- Ground: Xiacheng Stadium (下城体育场)
- Capacity: 15,500
- Chairman: Joe Liu (刘军)
- Manager: Cha Seungwoo
- Website: http://www.sinobalfootball.com

Hangzhou Sinobal Football Club (Chinese: 杭州赛搏足球俱乐部) is a Chinese semi-professional football club which formerly played in the Zhejiang Provincial and Hangzhou Municipal leagues; registered with both Hangzhou and Zhejiang Football Associations. The team is based in Hangzhou, Zhejiang, and their home stadium is the Xiacheng Stadium. Founded in 1998, their biggest achievements were winning several Zhejiang titles before they becoming national runner up for the Chinese amateur competition in 2000. Since 2006 the club has shifted its focus from amateur men's competition to developing youth Chinese talent and promoting the grassroots culture of the sport.

== Current squad and staff ==
As of 15 July 2015

=== First team squad ===
Note: Flags indicate national team as defined under FIFA eligibility rules; some limited exceptions apply. Players may hold more than one non-FIFA nationality.

No.	Pos.	Nation	Player
1	GK	CHN	Cao Tingfang
2	MF	CHN	Li Weili
3	DF	CHN	Liufeng
4	MF	CHN	Guozhen
5	DF	CHN	Haisen
6	DF	FRA	Jean Mermoz
7	FW	KAZ	Ilez Paragulov
8	MF	FRA	Amine
9	DF	ENG	Felix Michael Jones
10	MF	CHN	Zhen Rencai (captain)
11	MF	KOR	Cha Seungwoo
12	FW	EIR	Paul O'Brien
13	GK	CHN	Lu Qunfeng
16	FW	CHN	Lushan
17	MF	CHN	Zhouwei

=== Technical staff ===
Position	Name
Head coach	(South Korea) Cha Seungwoo
Assistant coaches	(United States) Trevor Lamb (China) Zhouwei
