= Wuji, Hebei =

Wuji 无极镇
- Town
- Interactive map of Wuji
- Coordinates: 38°10′45″N 114°58′35″E
- Country: People's Republic of China
- Province: Hebei
- Prefecture-level city: Shijiazhuang
- County: Wuji
- Elevation: 46 m (151 ft)
- Time zone: UTC+8 (China Standard Time)

Wuji (simplified Chinese: 无极; traditional Chinese: 無極; pinyin: Wújí) is a town in and the seat of Wuji County, in southwestern Hebei province, China, about 40 km (25 mi) east-northeast of the provincial capital of Shijiazhuang. As of 2011, it has 4 residential communities (社区) and 25 villages under its administration.

== See also ==
- List of township-level divisions of Hebei
