= Beisu, Hebei =

Beisu 北苏镇
- Town
- Location in Hebei
- Coordinates: 38°09′21″N 114°48′32″E
- Country: People's Republic of China
- Province: Hebei
- Prefecture-level city: Shijiazhuang
- County: Wuji
- Village-level divisions: 18 villages
- Elevation: 59 m (194 ft)
- Time zone: UTC+8 (China Standard)
- Area code: 0311

Beisu (simplified Chinese: 北苏; traditional Chinese: 北蘇; pinyin: Běisū) is a town of Wuji County, Hebei province, China, located 14 kilometres (8.7 mi) west of the county seat and about double that northeast of downtown Shijiazhuang. As of 2018, it has 18 villages under its administration.

== See also ==
- List of township-level divisions of Hebei
