= Mucun Township, Xinle =

Coordinates: 38.41052°N 114.68597°E

Mucun Township 木村乡
- Township

Chinese transcription(s)
- Interactive map of Mucun Township
- Country: China
- Province: Hebei
- Prefecture: Shijiazhuang
- County-level city: Xinle City
- Time zone: UTC+8 (China Standard Time)

Mucun Township (Chinese: 木村乡) is a township-level division of Xinle City, Shijiazhuang, Hebei, China.

== See also ==
- List of township-level divisions of Hebei
