= Lingshou Town =

Lingshou 灵寿镇
- Town
- Location in Hebei
- Coordinates: 38°18′23″N 114°22′42″E
- Country: People's Republic of China
- Province: Hebei
- Prefecture-level city: Shijiazhuang
- County: Lingshou
- Village-level divisions: 3 residential communities 22 villages
- Elevation: 105 m (344 ft)
- Time zone: UTC+8 (China Standard)
- Postal code: 050500
- Area code: 0311

Lingshou (simplified Chinese: 灵寿; traditional Chinese: 靈壽; pinyin: Língshòu) is a town in and the seat of Lingshou County, in southwestern Hebei province, China, about 30 km (19 mi) north-northwest of the provincial capital of Shijiazhuang. As of 2011, it has 3 residential communities (社区) and 22 villages under its administration.

== See also ==
- List of township-level divisions of Hebei
