= Lingshou County =

Lingshou County 灵寿县 Lingshow
- County
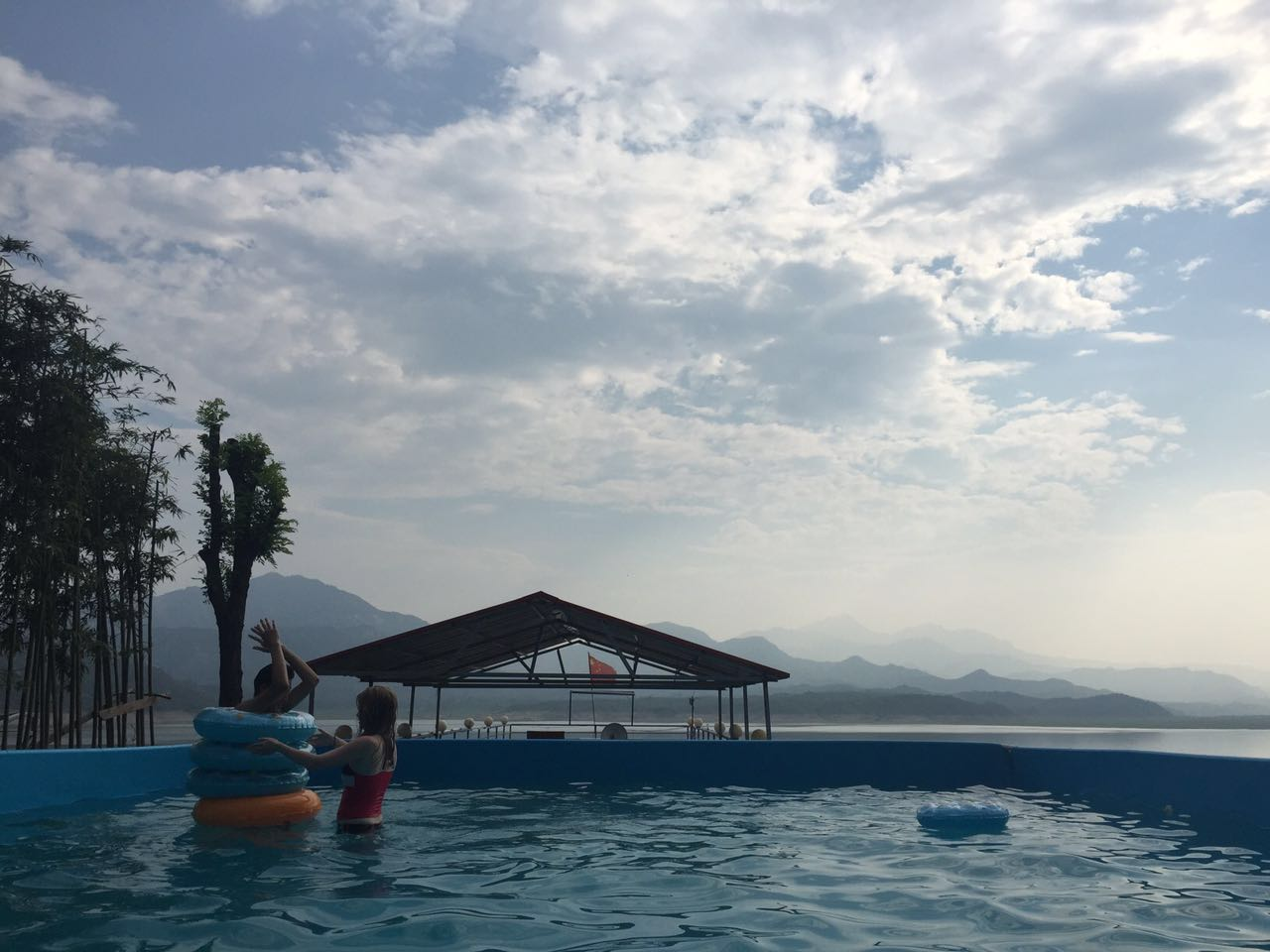
- Hengshanling Reservoir
- Interactive map of Lingshou County
- Location in Hebei
- Coordinates: 38°18′32″N 114°22′59″E
- Country: People's Republic of China
- Province: Hebei
- Prefecture-level city: Shijiazhuang

Area
  - Total: 1,066 km^{2} (412 sq mi)

Population (2020 census)
  - Total: 309,121
  - Density: 290.0/km^{2} (751.1/sq mi)
- Time zone: UTC+8 (China Standard)

Lingshou County (simplified Chinese: 灵寿县; traditional Chinese: 靈壽縣; pinyin: Língshòu Xiàn) is a county of Hebei Province, North China, under the administration of the prefecture-level city of Shijiazhuang, the capital of the province. Lingshou town is located in the southeastern portion of Lingshou County. The location of Lingshou town is approximately 38.309646 N, 114.382275 E.

== Administrative divisions ==
Towns:

- Lingshou Town (霛寿镇),
- Qingtong (青同镇),
- Tashang (塔上镇),
- Ciyu (慈峪镇),
- Chatou (岔头镇),
- Chenzhuang (陈庄镇)

Townships:

- Sanshengyuan Township (三圣院乡),
- Beiwa Township (北洼乡),
- Niucheng Township (牛城乡),
- Goutai Township (狗台乡),
- Nanzhai Township (南寨乡),
- Beitanzhuang Township (北谭庄乡),
- Zhaitou Township (寨头乡),
- Nanying Township (南营乡),
- Nanyanchuan Township (南燕川乡)

== Climate ==
Climate data for Lingshou, elevation 109 m (358 ft), (1991–2020 normals, extremes 1981–2010)
Month	Jan	Feb	Mar	Apr	May	Jun	Jul	Aug	Sep	Oct	Nov	Dec	Year
Record high °C (°F)	16.6 (61.9)	25.2 (77.4)	32.0 (89.6)	35.6 (96.1)	39.0 (102.2)	42.2 (108.0)	42.4 (108.3)	38.1 (100.6)	38.8 (101.8)	32.9 (91.2)	26.6 (79.9)	22.6 (72.7)	42.4 (108.3)
Mean daily maximum °C (°F)	3.3 (37.9)	7.4 (45.3)	14.5 (58.1)	21.8 (71.2)	27.6 (81.7)	32.0 (89.6)	32.1 (89.8)	30.4 (86.7)	26.7 (80.1)	20.4 (68.7)	11.4 (52.5)	4.7 (40.5)	19.4 (66.8)
Daily mean °C (°F)	−2.2 (28.0)	1.5 (34.7)	8.3 (46.9)	15.5 (59.9)	21.5 (70.7)	25.9 (78.6)	27.2 (81.0)	25.7 (78.3)	21.1 (70.0)	14.5 (58.1)	6.0 (42.8)	−0.5 (31.1)	13.7 (56.7)
Mean daily minimum °C (°F)	−6.3 (20.7)	−2.8 (27.0)	3.2 (37.8)	10.0 (50.0)	16.0 (60.8)	20.7 (69.3)	23.1 (73.6)	21.9 (71.4)	16.9 (62.4)	10.1 (50.2)	1.9 (35.4)	−4.3 (24.3)	9.2 (48.6)
Record low °C (°F)	−17.7 (0.1)	−17.0 (1.4)	−8.0 (17.6)	−1.2 (29.8)	6.4 (43.5)	12.1 (53.8)	15.7 (60.3)	14.3 (57.7)	6.2 (43.2)	−2.8 (27.0)	−9.2 (15.4)	−20.3 (−4.5)	−20.3 (−4.5)
Average precipitation mm (inches)	2.9 (0.11)	5.0 (0.20)	9.5 (0.37)	22.7 (0.89)	38.2 (1.50)	58.0 (2.28)	144.0 (5.67)	115.9 (4.56)	57.8 (2.28)	24.6 (0.97)	14.3 (0.56)	2.8 (0.11)	495.7 (19.5)
Average precipitation days (≥ 0.1 mm)	1.9	2.4	3.0	5.2	6.2	9.1	12.0	11.0	7.7	5.6	3.7	2.2	70
Average snowy days	2.3	2.4	1.2	0.2	0	0	0	0	0	0	1.5	2.4	10
Average relative humidity (%)	56	51	48	53	55	58	72	76	70	64	63	59	60
Mean monthly sunshine hours	150.2	161.5	207.7	230.7	257.9	214.8	172.4	177.1	180.1	180.4	152.1	145.6	2,230.5
Percentage possible sunshine	49	53	56	58	58	49	39	43	49	53	51	50	51
Source: China Meteorological Administration

== Recreational Areas ==
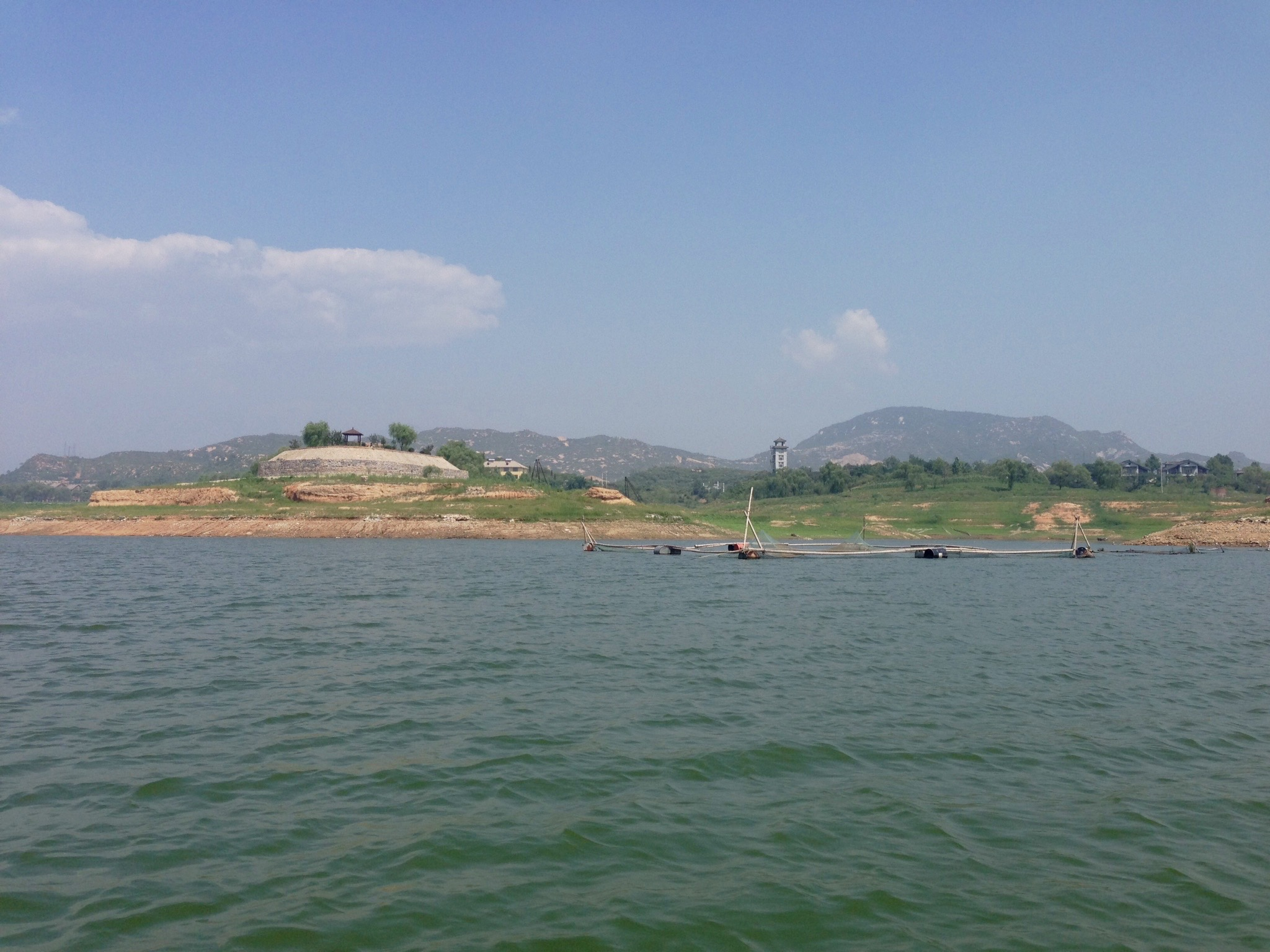
Hengshanling Reservoir in Lingshou County.

The Hengshanling Reservoir (横山岭水库) is located in central Lingshou County, nearby Wangjiagou Village (河北省石家庄市灵寿县陈庄镇王家沟村). The Hengshan Scenic Area (横山景区) sits on the border of Hengshanlin.
