= Hao Pengju =

Chinese general (1903–1947)

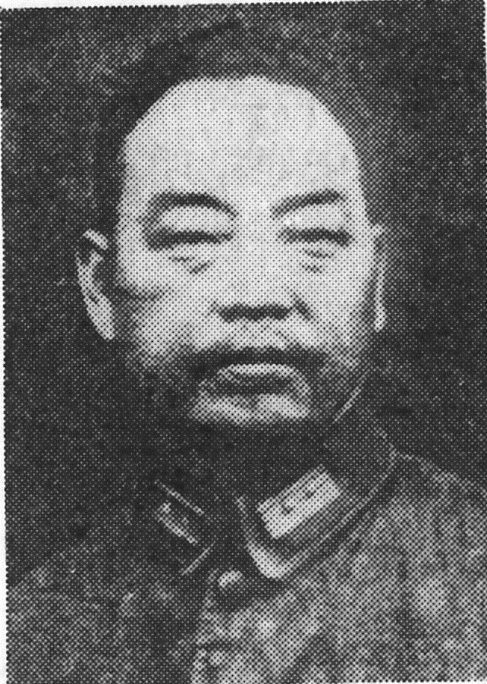
Hao Pengju

Hao Pengju (simplified Chinese: 郝鹏举; traditional Chinese: 郝鵬舉; pinyin: Hǎo Péngjǔ; Wade–Giles: Hao P'eng-chü; January 29, 1903 – September 1947) was a general and governor of Huaihai province of the Republic of China. He belonged to the Guominjun and the National Revolutionary Army. Later he belonged to the Wang Jingwei regime, and in the Chinese Civil War, he participated in the Chinese Communist Party temporarily. His childhood name was Mian (勉), courtesy name was Tengxiao (騰霄). He was born in Wenxiang (閿郷, now Lingbao), Henan.

== Life ==
=== From Guominjun to National Revolutionary Army ===
Hao Pengju's father was an officer of county's office, but his father became addicted and disabled by opium and the family sank into poverty. Hao Pengju left his family home and was raised and educated by a hermitic Buddhist monk in Hua Shan until he was sixteen years old.

In May 1922 Hao Pengju entered the Military Governor of Henan Feng Yuxiang's Army, whereupon Hao gradually rose to prominence. In November 1925 Hao went to study military affairs at the Military Academy at Kiev in the Soviet Union. His sharp intelligence helped him excel in his studies. Later he returned to China, participated in the Northern Expedition in the 2nd Area Army of the National Revolutionary Army which Feng commanded. Hao performed military exploits in this war, and in May 1928, he was catapulted to Chief of Staff to the 2nd Army of the 2nd Area Army.

In next spring Feng Yuxiang engaged in the Anti-Chiang Kai-shek War. But Feng was inferior in numbers to Chiang, so Hao escaped on purpose to Zhengzhou. In October 1930 Hao participated in the 25th Route Army which his former colleague Liang Guanying (梁冠英) commanded, and was appointed Chief of the general command division in it. And he also entered the Fuxingshe (復興社) through the good links of a schoolmate in the Soviet Union He Zhonghan (賀衷寒).

Later Hao Pengju was opposed to Liang Guanying, so Hao was removed from his position. Thanks to He Zhonghan's recommendation, Hao was appointed Chief of Staff to the 30th Army which Sun Lianzhong commanded. But Hao plotted against Liang several times, so Sun removed Hao, and relegated him to the 14th period in Army University for retraining.

After the Second Sino-Japanese War broke out, in April 1938, by He Zhonghan's recommendation, Hao Pengju belonged to the 34th Army Group which Hu Zongnan commanded in Xi'an. Next June, Hao was promoted to Chief of Staff of the 27th Army. Another military officer fell in love with Hao's wife, Hao Liu Chung, a clever and beautiful woman. This officer accused Hao as a traitor to get him out of the way. Hu put Hao in prison. Hao was held in prison for 366 days, when he was released he was shunned as a traitor and angry at being wrongfully imprisoned. Hao gave his allegiance to the Chairman of Suiyuan Fu Zuoyi. Hao was appointed by Fu Vice-Commander of the 5th Provisional Army.

=== In the Wang Jingwei regime ===
From March 1940 Hao Pengju contacted secretly Zhou Fohai in the Wang Jingwei regime. In 1941 Hao went to Nangjing, and pledged allegiance to the Wang Jingwei regime formally. The Minister for Publicity Lin Bosheng (林柏生) was Hao's schoolmate in the Soviet Union. So Hao won Chen Bijun's (陳璧君; Wang Jingwei's wife) confidence through the good offices of Lin. In July of the same year Hao was appointed Chief of Staff to the 1st Army Group which was stationed at Taizhou, Jiangsu. In next August he was transferred to the position of Superintendent of Education to the Training Group for the Military Officer of the Central Army. Two months later, he was appointed Chief of Aide-de-camp of the Military Committee.

In September 1943 Hao Pengju was appointed Chief Executive and Commander of the security forces of Suhuai Special Region (蘇淮特別區行政長官兼保安司令). In same November he also held the position of Chief Security Officer to Xuzhou (駐徐州綏靖主任公署主任). When in January 1944 Suhuai Special Region was reorganised and renamed to Huaihai Province (淮海省), he was appointed Governor of Huaihai, and also held the position of General-Commander of the 6th Route Army.

=== In the Chinese Civil War ===
After the Wang Jingwei regime had collapsed, Hao Pengju surrendered to Chiang Kaishek. From October 1945 Hao commanded the former 6th Route Army and attacked the Southern Shandong Communist's Area (魯南解放区). But the following January he visited the Commander-in-Chief of the Eastern China Field Army (華東野戰軍) Chen Yi unexpectedly and surrendered to the Chinese Communist Party. Because Hao understood the Kuomintang was inferior in numbers to the Communist Party, and Communist Party also invited him. For a while, Hao worked as the commander of the Communist Party.

But in January 1947 Hao Pengju declared his Anti-communism. He returned to the Kuomintang in Haizhou, and attacked the Communist Area in the Longhai Railway's easternmost immediately. But the People's Liberation Army swiftly launched a counterattack against Hao and next month, Hao's Army was annihilated and Hao was captured by the People's Liberation Army. Hao asked for interview with Chen Yi, but upon meeting with Hao, Chen criticized Hao's act of disloyalty by unsparing words.

The same year, when Hao Pengju was sent to the northern area, he tried to escape. But he was found by guardian, and was shot to death.

== Family and descendants ==
Hao Pengju's wife Hao Liu Chung emigrated from Hong Kong to Japan and then the United States with the surviving four children: two sons and two daughters.

Political offices
Preceded by Hao Peng	Chief Executive of the Suhuai Special Region (Wang Jingwei Government); September 1943 — August 1945	Succeeded by office abolished
