= Xinle, Hebei =

Xinle 新乐市 Sinlo
- County-level City
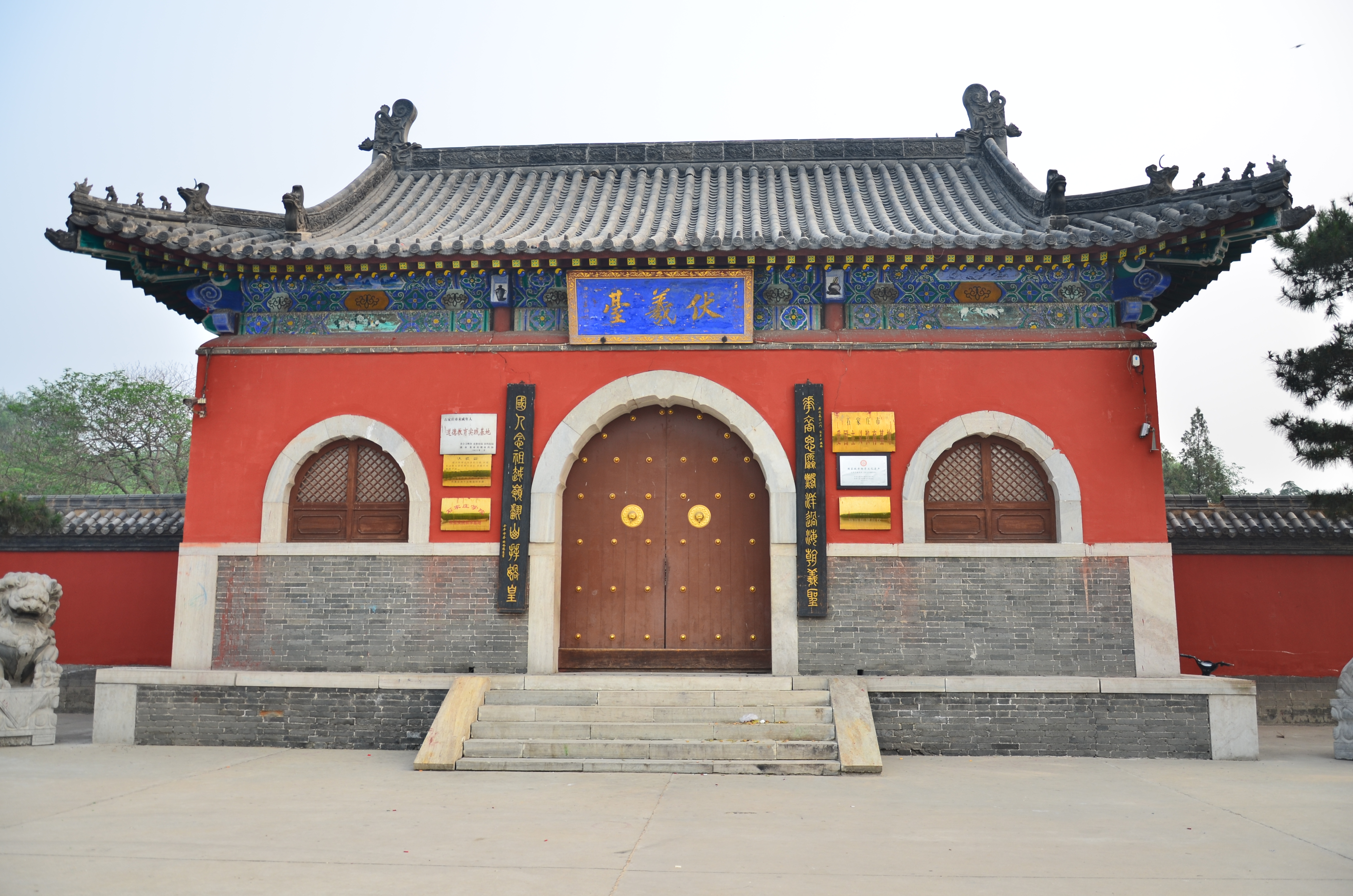
- Fuxi Temple

- Location of the city center in Hebei
- Coordinates: 38°20′35″N 114°41′02″E
- Country: People's Republic of China
- Province: Hebei
- Prefecture-level city: Shijiazhuang

Area
  - County-level City: 525.0 km^{2} (202.7 sq mi)
  - Urban: 45.92 km^{2} (17.73 sq mi)

Population (2017)
  - County-level City: 519,000
  - Density: 989/km^{2} (2,560/sq mi)
  - Urban: 91,600
- Time zone: UTC+8 (China Standard)
- Postal code: 050700
- Area code: 0311

Xinle (simplified Chinese: 新乐; traditional Chinese: 新樂; pinyin: Xīnlè; lit. 'New Joy') is a county-level city of Hebei Province, North China. It is under the administration of the prefecture-level city of Shijiazhuang.

== Administrative divisions ==
Subdistricts:

- Changshou Subdistrict (长寿街道)

Towns:

- Cheng'an (承安镇), Hantai (邯邰镇), Dongwang (东王镇), Matoupu (马头铺镇), Zhengmo (正莫镇), Dugu (杜固镇), Nandayue (南大岳镇), Huapi (化皮镇)

Townships:

- Xieshen Township (协神乡), Mucun Township (木村乡), Pengjiazhuang Hui Ethnic Township (彭家庄回族乡)

== Climate ==
Climate data for Xinle, elevation 71 m (233 ft), (1991–2020 normals, extremes 1981–2010)
Month	Jan	Feb	Mar	Apr	May	Jun	Jul	Aug	Sep	Oct	Nov	Dec	Year
Record high °C (°F)	16.3 (61.3)	25.3 (77.5)	32.2 (90.0)	34.1 (93.4)	39.2 (102.6)	42.1 (107.8)	42.9 (109.2)	37.4 (99.3)	39.0 (102.2)	32.9 (91.2)	25.1 (77.2)	21.7 (71.1)	42.9 (109.2)
Mean daily maximum °C (°F)	3.1 (37.6)	7.2 (45.0)	14.4 (57.9)	21.5 (70.7)	27.3 (81.1)	32.0 (89.6)	32.2 (90.0)	30.5 (86.9)	26.9 (80.4)	20.4 (68.7)	11.2 (52.2)	4.5 (40.1)	19.3 (66.7)
Daily mean °C (°F)	−3.0 (26.6)	0.9 (33.6)	7.9 (46.2)	15.0 (59.0)	21.0 (69.8)	25.8 (78.4)	27.2 (81.0)	25.6 (78.1)	20.9 (69.6)	14.1 (57.4)	5.3 (41.5)	−1.1 (30.0)	13.3 (55.9)
Mean daily minimum °C (°F)	−7.7 (18.1)	−4.1 (24.6)	2.1 (35.8)	8.9 (48.0)	14.8 (58.6)	20.0 (68.0)	22.7 (72.9)	21.5 (70.7)	16.0 (60.8)	9.1 (48.4)	0.9 (33.6)	−5.4 (22.3)	8.2 (46.8)
Record low °C (°F)	−22.6 (−8.7)	−19.0 (−2.2)	−8.0 (17.6)	−4.2 (24.4)	2.6 (36.7)	9.0 (48.2)	15.7 (60.3)	13.7 (56.7)	2.4 (36.3)	−3.9 (25.0)	−10.8 (12.6)	−21.5 (−6.7)	−22.6 (−8.7)
Average precipitation mm (inches)	2.7 (0.11)	5.3 (0.21)	8.4 (0.33)	23.1 (0.91)	36.3 (1.43)	61.4 (2.42)	133.1 (5.24)	137.5 (5.41)	51.3 (2.02)	23.5 (0.93)	13.3 (0.52)	2.7 (0.11)	498.6 (19.64)
Average precipitation days (≥ 0.1 mm)	1.8	2.6	2.6	4.9	6.1	8.3	11.2	10.0	7.1	5.5	3.6	2.0	65.7
Average snowy days	2.1	2.3	1.0	0.2	0	0	0	0	0	0	1.2	2.2	9
Average relative humidity (%)	54	50	47	53	57	58	73	77	71	64	63	58	60
Mean monthly sunshine hours	151.3	157.5	209.3	236.7	264.6	228.1	188.8	190.6	190.0	181.1	153.8	147.7	2,299.5
Percentage possible sunshine	50	51	56	59	60	52	42	46	52	53	51	50	52
Source: China Meteorological Administration
