= Dan Hao =

Chinese software engineer

Dan Hao (Chinese: 郝丹) is a Chinese software engineering researcher specializing in software testing and debugging, and automatic bug fixing. She is a professor in the Institute of Software of the Peking University School of Computer Science.

After a 2002 bachelor's degree from the Harbin Institute of Technology, Hao completed her Ph.D. in 2008 at Peking University. Hao was named to the 2026 class of IEEE Fellows, "for contributions to software testing and debugging".
