= Hantai, Hebei =

Hantai 邯邰镇
- Town
- Location in Hebei
- Coordinates: 38°18′55″N 114°50′14″E
- Country: People's Republic of China
- Province: Hebei
- Prefecture-level city: Shijiazhuang
- County-level city: Xinle
- Village-level divisions: 19 villages
- Elevation: 62 m (203 ft)
- Time zone: UTC+8 (China Standard)
- Area code: 0311

Hantai (Chinese: 邯邰; pinyin: Hántái) is a town under the administration of Xinle City in southwestern Hebei province, China, located 14 kilometres (8.7 mi) east-southeast of downtown Xinle. As of 2011, it has 19 villages under its administration.

== See also ==
- List of township-level divisions of Hebei
