= Chinese football league system =

Series of interconnected leagues

- Country: China
- Sport: Association football
- Promotion and relegation: Yes

National system
- Federation: Chinese Football Association
- Confederation: AFC
- Top division: Men; Super League; Women; Women's Super League
- Second division: Men; League One; Women; Women's League
- Cup competition: Men; CFA Cup; CFA Supercup; Women; CFA Women's Cup; Chinese Women's Football Championship

The Chinese football league system or Chinese football league pyramid, refers to the hierarchically interconnected league system for the Chinese Football Association (CFA) that currently consists of 8 tiers with 29 individual leagues, in a series of partially interconnected leagues that are bound together by the principle of promotion and relegation.

A significant feature of the system is that clubs who succeed in the various CFA cup competitions can be promoted multiple times in one season.

By the "Notice of the General Office of the State Council on the Issuance of the General Plan for the Reform and Development of Football in China" dated 8 March 2015, the CFA has set a target of an eight-level league system, which is scheduled to be realised by 2030:

- Professional levels

1. CFA Super League

2. CFA China League

3. CFA Division Two League

- Amateur levels

4. CFA Member Association Champions League Finals

5. CFA Member Association Champions League Regional Competitions

6. Leagues of CFA member associations

7. Leagues of city-level associations (include prefecture-level and county-level cities)

8. Leagues of county-level associations (include counties and autonomous counties)

The target has principally followed the proposed structure in its implementation.

== Men's system ==
The top 3 tiers are nationwide professional competitions, Super League, China League, Division Two League, have promotion and relegation between the leagues.

The hierarchical system continues and levels have progressively more parallel divisions, which each cover progressively smaller geographic areas. 50 CFA Member Associations organise different forms of competitions and 22 of them organise regular leagues, which locate from tier 4 of the system. Only Zhejiang Super League has feeder leagues.

CFA Member Association Champions League, is the amateur football finals each season, involving 64 teams from across the country. All teams registered with CFA member associations are required to gain access to the CFA Member Association Champions League in various ways, including participating and winning in leagues organised by the member association (tier 4 leagues). This is the only way to enter top 3 tiers and be a part of the professional system.

Level	Total clubs	League(s) / division(s)	
1	16	Chinese Super League; 16 clubs – 2 relegations	
2	16	China League One; 16 clubs – 2 promotions, 2 relegations	
3	24	China League Two; 24 clubs – 2 promotions, 2 relegations	
4	80	Chinese Champions League; 64 clubs – 3.5 promotions	Chinese Youth Football Elite League (Division U21); 16 clubs – 0.5 promotions
5–6		Changchun Amateur (18 clubs) Chengdu City Super (10 clubs) Chongqing Amateur Super (12 clubs) | One (6 clubs) Fujian Super (4 clubs) | One (TBD clubs) Guangdong Super (16 clubs) Guangxi Clubs Championship (4 clubs) Guangzhou (8 clubs) Hainan Super (8 clubs) | One (16 clubs) Hunan Super (7 clubs) Hunan (14 clubs) Jiangsu Champions (8 clubs) Jiangxi Super (6 clubs) Liaoning Cities Super (16 clubs) Nanjing Super (8 clubs) Qingdao City Super (8 clubs) | One (12 clubs) | Two (22 clubs) Shanghai Super A (7 clubs) | Super B (6 clubs) | One A (7 clubs) | One B (6 clubs) Shenzhen City Super (8 clubs) | One (6 clubs) | Two (12 clubs) Tianjin Super (13 clubs) | One (11 clubs) | Two (126 clubs) Wuhan City Super (8 clubs) Xiamen Super (8 clubs) | A (10 clubs) | B (12 clubs) | Grassroots (8 clubs) Xinjiang Championship (8 clubs) Zhejiang Super A (8 clubs) | Super B (8 clubs) China University Super (16 clubs) | One (24 clubs) w/ other cup competitions	
7		Affiliated associations of Zhejiang FA (69 clubs) ↑ 0-1 promotion spot to Zhejiang Super B (through play-off) Hangzhou West Lake Super (8 clubs) | Championship A (24 clubs) | Championship B (TBD clubs) Huzhou Super (5 clubs) Ningbo Super (14 clubs) Wenzhou Amateur Super (8 clubs) | A (10 clubs) w/ other cup competitions	

== Women's system ==
The three levels of women's football are structured as follows:

Level	Leagues
1	CFA Women's Super League (CWCL); 12 clubs ↓ 1 relegation playoff spot
2	CFA Women's League; 12 clubs ↑ 2 promotion spots + 1 promotion playoff spot
3	CFA Women's Division 2 League; 24 clubs ↑ 2 promotion spots

== See also ==
- List of Hong Kong, Macau and Taiwanese players in Chinese football leagues
