= Shenze County =

Shenze County 深泽县 Shentseh
- County
- Location in Hebei
- Coordinates: 38°11′02″N 115°12′04″E
- Country: People's Republic of China
- Province: Hebei
- Prefecture-level city: Shijiazhuang

Area
  - Total: 296 km^{2} (114 sq mi)

Population (2020 census)
  - Total: 215,806
  - Density: 729/km^{2} (1,890/sq mi)
- Time zone: UTC+8 (China Standard)
- Postal code: 052560
- Area code: 0311
- License plate prefixes: 冀A

Shenze County (simplified Chinese: 深泽县; traditional Chinese: 深澤縣; pinyin: Shēnzé Xiàn; lit. 'Deep Lake') is a county of Hebei Province, North China, under the administration of the prefecture-level city of Shijiazhuang, the provincial capital.

== Administrative divisions ==
Towns:

- Shenze Town (深泽镇), Tiegan (铁杆镇)

Townships:

- Baizhuang Township (白庄乡), Liucun Township (留村乡), Zhaoba Township (赵八乡), Qiaotou Township (桥头乡)

== Climate ==
Climate data for Shenze, elevation 38 m (125 ft), (1991–2020 normals, extremes 1981–2010)
Month	Jan	Feb	Mar	Apr	May	Jun	Jul	Aug	Sep	Oct	Nov	Dec	Year
Record high °C (°F)	17.2 (63.0)	23.6 (74.5)	30.5 (86.9)	34.4 (93.9)	39.6 (103.3)	40.7 (105.3)	42.0 (107.6)	36.8 (98.2)	36.2 (97.2)	32.1 (89.8)	25.8 (78.4)	20.2 (68.4)	42.0 (107.6)
Mean daily maximum °C (°F)	3.1 (37.6)	7.4 (45.3)	14.5 (58.1)	21.6 (70.9)	27.4 (81.3)	32.1 (89.8)	32.5 (90.5)	30.7 (87.3)	26.9 (80.4)	20.7 (69.3)	11.2 (52.2)	4.4 (39.9)	19.4 (66.9)
Daily mean °C (°F)	−2.9 (26.8)	0.9 (33.6)	7.8 (46.0)	14.9 (58.8)	20.8 (69.4)	25.7 (78.3)	27.2 (81.0)	25.5 (77.9)	20.6 (69.1)	13.9 (57.0)	5.3 (41.5)	−1.1 (30.0)	13.2 (55.8)
Mean daily minimum °C (°F)	−7.4 (18.7)	−4.0 (24.8)	2.0 (35.6)	8.8 (47.8)	14.5 (58.1)	19.8 (67.6)	22.8 (73.0)	21.3 (70.3)	15.7 (60.3)	8.7 (47.7)	0.8 (33.4)	−5.2 (22.6)	8.2 (46.7)
Record low °C (°F)	−20.5 (−4.9)	−16.4 (2.5)	−8.8 (16.2)	−2.2 (28.0)	4.4 (39.9)	9.6 (49.3)	16.0 (60.8)	12.7 (54.9)	5.2 (41.4)	−3.5 (25.7)	−13.3 (8.1)	−19.5 (−3.1)	−20.5 (−4.9)
Average precipitation mm (inches)	1.8 (0.07)	4.6 (0.18)	8.0 (0.31)	28.1 (1.11)	34.5 (1.36)	67.3 (2.65)	115.1 (4.53)	128.2 (5.05)	46.3 (1.82)	23.8 (0.94)	13.4 (0.53)	2.6 (0.10)	473.7 (18.65)
Average precipitation days (≥ 0.1 mm)	1.5	2.3	2.5	4.8	6.1	8.0	10.5	9.4	6.4	4.8	3.8	1.7	61.8
Average snowy days	2.6	2.5	1.3	0.2	0	0	0	0	0	0	1.3	2.3	10.2
Average relative humidity (%)	57	53	50	56	60	61	74	80	74	67	67	62	63
Mean monthly sunshine hours	149.9	161.6	211.7	236.1	259.9	231.4	188.5	195.1	192.6	181.2	147.3	146.4	2,301.7
Percentage possible sunshine	49	53	57	59	59	52	42	47	52	53	49	50	52
Source: China Meteorological Administration
