= Guan Mucun =

Chinese singer

Guan Mucun (Chinese: 关牧村; born 1953) is a Chinese mezzo-soprano singer and member of the CPC born in Xinxiang, Henan province.

== Early life and education ==
Guan grew up in Tianjin and worked in animal husbandry until 1977 when she was admitted to Tianjin Song and Dance Troupe as an actress.

In 1987 she graduated from the Central Conservatory of Music and in 1991 earned her master's degree from Nankai University. She studied under Shi Guangnan, and Li Weijie.

== Career ==
Guan developed her own musical style by blending Western with traditional Chinese melodies.

=== Works ===
- Starring costume opera "official Sister" (1981)
- Star and lead singer of China's first musical feature film "sea rising moon" (1983)
- To participate in large-scale music and dance epic "Song of the Chinese revolution" performance (1985)
- Star, lead singer of TV musical feature film "The Last Elegy" (1986)
- Involved in performing in major TV art film classic, "Tang and Song Melody" (1990)
- And the Central Opera House to perform the opera "Qu Yuan" (1991)
- TV opera "The Last Elegy"
- Academy of Television Arts film "Turpan grapes ripe", "beautiful Dunhuang", "Under the Moonlight"
- Art 1993, a TV film "Turpan grapes ripe" album;

== Awards ==
- "New Long March udarnik" title (for three consecutive years 1979-1981)
- Tianjin young actor prize Vocal Competition (1980)
- By the Chinese Ministry of Culture Award for Outstanding Actor (1985)
- China Central Television "organized by the national audience favorite singers," Macau Cup Award (1986)
- China National Class One Performer title (awarded 1988)
- China's first Gold Record (1989)
- China's first Young Artist Award Competition
- 13th World Youth Festival Artistic Achievement Award for the highest (1989 in Korea to obtain)
- Singing "Golden wind came" won first prize in rural China Singing
- For the TV series "consultation and Weight years" concert theme song, "a memorable song" Song of the Year by the excellent Chinese film
- China's State Council approved the government special allowance (1991)
- Ministry of Culture title excellent expert (1992)
- March Eighth Hong Qishou title (1992)
- Tianjin labor model (1984, 1994)
- "Model of national unity and progress," the title (in 1998 granted the State Ethnic Affairs Commission)
- China's advanced workers (2000)
- China Charity Federation issued the first "China Charity Award" (2005)
