= Hao Peng (ROC) =

Chinese politician

Hao Peng (Chinese: 郝鹏; pinyin: Hǎo Péng; Wade–Giles: Hao P'eng; 1881–1946) was a politician of the Republic of China. He belonged to the Beijing Government, later he became an important politician during the Wang Jingwei regime. His courtesy name was Yucang (浴滄). He was born in Sanhe, Zhili (Hebei).

== Life ==
At the end of the Qing Dynasty, Hao Peng graduated from the Shandong High School. At first he entered the educational system in Fengtian, and successively held the positions of general supervisor of the elementary school and teacher of the preparatory school for studying abroad, manager of the junior high school. Then he turned to political circles, and successively held the positions of president of the Gazette Bureau of Hubei and leader of the Department of Agricultural Affairs of the public office for encouragement of industry, Shandong (山東省勸業公所農務科科長).

After the proclamation of the Republic of China, Hao Peng successively held the positions of public prosecutor of the Financial Ministry and chief of the General Affairs Agency. From December 1924 until January 1926 he worked as Chief of the Financial Agency of Zhili. Later he became a staff officer for Zhang Zongchang, and was appointed Governor of Anhui. In 1927 he retired from political activity for a while.

In October 1941 Hao Peng was appointed Member of the Commission for Rivers and Aqueducts in North China (華北河渠委員會委員) of the North China Political Council (華北政務委員會), the Wang Jingwei regime. In next January he was catapulted to Chief Executive of the Suhuai Special Region (蘇淮特別區行政長官). In March of the same year he also held the position of commander of that Region's security forces. In September 1943 he was appointed Political Councilor (政務參赞) of the Nanjing Nationalist Government (Wang's clique).

After the Second World War, Hao Peng was arrested, and finally died in Jinan.

== Footnotes ==
- Xu Youchun (徐友春) (main ed.) (2007). Unabridged Biographical Dictionary of the Republic, Revised and Enlarged Version (民国人物大辞典 增订版). Hebei People's Press (Hebei Renmin Chubanshe; 河北人民出版社). ISBN 978-7-202-03014-1.
- Liu Shoulin (刘寿林) (etc.ed.) (1995). The Chronological Table of the Republic's Officer (民国职官年表). Zhonghua Book Company. ISBN 7-101-01320-1.

Political offices
Preceded by office established	Chief Executive of the Suhuai Special Region (Wang Jingwei Government); January 1942 — September 1943	Succeeded by Hao Pengju
