= Hao Jiming =

Chinese environmental engineer

Hao Jiming (Chinese: 郝吉明; born 25 August 1946) is a Chinese environmental engineer and President of the International Ecological Economic Promotion Association.

A native of Shandong Province, Hao earned a bachelor's degree in civil engineering from Tsinghua University before pursuing a master's degree in environmental engineering from the same institution. Hao received a Ph.D. in environmental engineering at the University of Cincinnati.

He became a member of the Chinese Academy of Engineering in 2005. He was also elected an international member of the United States National Academy of Engineering in 2018 for leadership in the development and implementation of air pollution control theory, strategy, and technologies.
