= Peng Hao (footballer, born 2001) =

Chinese association football player

Personal information
- Date of birth: 25 December 2001 (age 24)
- Place of birth: Bazhong, Sichuan, China
- Height: 1.89 m (6 ft 2 in)
- Position: Midfielder

Team information
- Current team: Shanghai Port
- Number: 40

Youth career
- –2020: Shanghai Port

Senior career*
| Years | Team | Apps | (Gls) |
| 2020– | Shanghai Port | 0 | (0) |

International career^{‡}
- China U18
- China U19
- * Club domestic league appearances and goals as of 14:01, 28 July 2021 (UTC) ‡ National team caps and goals as of 14:01, 28 July 2021 (UTC)

Peng Hao (Chinese: 彭号; born 25 December 2001) is a Chinese footballer currently playing as a midfielder for Shanghai Port.

== Career statistics ==
=== Club ===
As of 28 June 2021.

| Club | Season | League | | | Cup | | Continental | | Other | | Total | |
| Club | Season | Division | Apps | Goals | Apps | Goals | Apps | Goals | Apps | Goals | Apps | Goals |
|---|---|---|---|---|---|---|---|---|---|---|---|---|
| Shanghai Port | 2020 | Chinese Super League | 0 | 0 | 0 | 0 | 1 (Note: Appearances in the AFC Champions League) | 0 | 0 | 0 | 1 | 0 |
| Shanghai Port | 2021 | Chinese Super League | 0 | 0 | 0 | 0 | 0 | 0 | 0 | 0 | 0 | 0 |
| Career total | | | 0 | 0 | 0 | 0 | 1 | 0 | 0 | 0 | 1 | 0 |
