= List of township-level divisions of Hebei =

Location of Hebei province in China

This is a list of township-level divisions of the province of Hebei, People's Republic of China (PRC). After province, prefecture, and county-level divisions, township-level divisions constitute the formal fourth-level administrative divisions of the PRC. There are a total of 2,186 such divisions in Hebei, divided into 1 district public office (Nanshan District, Zhuolu County) 241 subdistricts, 939 towns, 954 townships, and 51 ethnic townships, the last type mainly designated for the Hui, Manchu, and/or Mongol ethnic groups. This list is divided first into the prefecture-level cities then the county-level divisions.

== Shijiazhuang ==
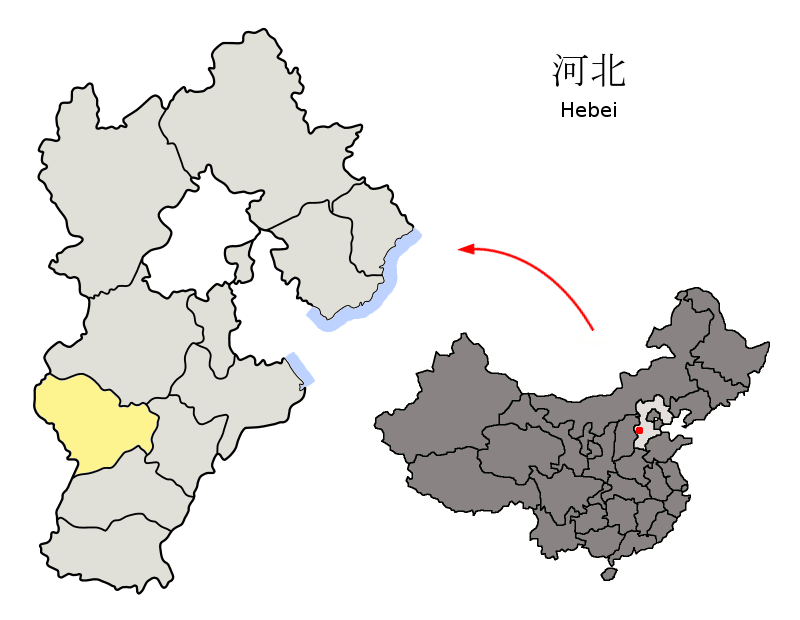
Location of Shijiazhuang in the province

=== Chang'an District ===
There are eight subdistricts and three towns in Chang'an District.

Subdistricts:

- Jianbei Subdistrict (建北街道), Qingyuan Subdistrict (青园街道), Guang'an Subdistrict (广安街道), Yucai Subdistrict (育才街道), Yuejin Subdistrict (跃进街道), Hedong Subdistrict (河东街道), Changfeng Subdistrict (长丰街道), Tangu Subdistrict (谈固街道)

Towns:

- Xizhaotong (西兆通镇), Nancun (南村镇), Gaoying (高营镇)

=== Gaocheng District ===
Towns:

- Lianzhou (廉州镇), Gangshang (岗上镇), Nandong (南董镇), Xing'an (兴安镇), Nanmeng (南孟镇), Meihua (梅花镇), Chang'an (常安镇), Zengcun (增村镇), Xiguan (西关镇), Zhangjiazhuang (张家庄镇), Jiashizhuang (贾市庄镇), Qiutou (丘头镇), Nanying (南营镇)

Townships:

- Jiumen Hui Ethnic Township (九门回族乡)

=== Jingxing Mining District ===
Subdistricts:

- Kuangshi Subdistrict (矿市街道), Siwei Subdistrict (四微街道)

Towns:

- Jiazhuang (贾庄镇), Fengshan (凤山镇)

The only township is Hengjian (横涧乡)

=== Qiaodong District ===
Subdistricts:

- East Zhongshan Road Subdistrict (中山东路街道), Penghou Subdistrict (彭后街道), Dongfeng Subdistrict (东风街道), Donghua Subdistrict (东华街道), Xiumen Subdistrict (休门街道), Fukang Subdistrict (阜康街道), Jian'an Subdistrict (建安街道), Shengli North Subdistrict (胜利北街道), Huitong Subdistrict (汇通街道)

The only town is Taoyuan (桃园镇)

=== Qiaoxi District ===
Subdistricts:

- Dongli Subdistrict (东里街道), Zhongshan Road Subdistrict (中山路街道), Nanchang Subdistrict (南长街道), Weiming Subdistrict (维明街道), Yuxi Subdistrict (裕西街道), Youyi Subdistrict (友谊街道), Hongqi Subdistrict (红旗街道), Xinshi Subdistrict (新石街道), Yuandong Subdistrict (苑东街道), Xili Subdistrict (西里街道), Zhentou Subdistrict (振头街道)

The only township is Liuying Township (留营乡)

=== Xinhua District ===
Subdistricts:

- Gexin Subdistrict (革新街道), Xinhua Road Subdistrict (新华路街道), Ning'an Subdistrict (宁安街道), Dongjiao Subdistrict (东焦街道), Xiyuan Subdistrict (西苑街道), Hezuo Road Subdistrict (合作路街道), Lianmeng Subdistrict (联盟街道), Shigang Subdistrict (石岗街道), Wuqi Subdistrict (五七街道), Tianyuan Subdistrict (天苑街道), Beiyuan Subdistrict (北苑街道)

Towns:

- Daguo (大郭镇), Zhaolingpuxi (赵陵铺西镇)

Townships:

- Sanzhuang Township (三庄乡), Dubei Township (杜北乡)

=== Yuhua District ===
Subdistricts

- Yuxing Subdistrict (裕兴街道), Yuqiang Subdistrict (裕强街道), Dongyuan Subdistrict (东苑街道), Jiantong Subdistrict (建通街道), Huaidi Subdistrict (槐底街道), Yuhua Road Subdistrict (裕华路街道), Yudong Subdistrict (裕东街道), Changjiang Subdistrict (长江街道), Taihang Subdistrict (太行街道)

Towns:

- Songying (宋营镇), Fangcun (方村镇)

=== Jinzhou ===
Towns:

- Jinzhou (晋州镇), Zongshizhuang (总十庄镇), Yingli (营里镇), Taoyuan (桃园镇), Dongzhuosu (东卓宿镇), Mayu (马于镇), Xiaoqiao (小樵镇), Huaishu (槐树镇), Donglizhuang (东里庄镇)

The only township is Zhoujiazhuang Township (周家庄乡)

=== Luquan ===
Towns:

- Huailu (获鹿镇), Tongye (铜冶镇), Sijiazhuang (寺家庄镇), Shangzhuang (上庄镇), Licun (李村镇), Yi'an (宜安镇), Huangbizhuang (黄壁庄镇), Dahe (大河镇), Shanyincun (山尹村镇)

Townships:

- Shijing Township (石井乡), Bailuquan Township (白鹿泉乡), Shangzhai Township (上寨乡)

=== Xinji ===
Towns:

- Xinji (辛集镇), Zhangguzhuang (张古庄镇), Weibo (位伯镇), Jiucheng (旧城镇), Xinleitou (新垒头镇), Xincheng (新城镇), Nanzhiqiong (南智邱镇), Wangkou (王口镇)

Townships:

- Xiaoxinzhuang Township (小辛庄乡), Zhonglixiang Township (中里厢乡), Tiangongying Township (天宫营乡), Qianying Township (前营乡), Hemujing Township (和睦井乡), Tianjiazhuang Township (田家庄乡), Mazhuang Township (马庄乡)

=== Xinle City ===
Subdistricts:

- Changshou Subdistrict (长寿街道)

Towns:

- Cheng'an (承安镇), Hantai (邯邰镇), Dongwang (东王镇), Matoupu (马头铺镇), Zhengmo (正莫镇), Dugu (杜固镇), Nandayue (南大岳镇), Huapi (化皮镇)

Townships:

- Xieshen Township (协神乡), Mucun Township (木村乡), Pengjiazhuang Hui Ethnic Township (彭家庄回族乡)

=== Gaoyi County ===
Towns:

- Gaoyi (高邑镇), Daying (大营镇), Fucun (富村镇)

Townships:

- Zhonghan Township (中韩乡), Wancheng Township (万城乡),

=== Jingxing County ===
Towns:

- Weishui (微水镇), Shang'an (上安镇), Tianchang (天长镇), Xiulin (秀林镇), Nanyu (南峪镇), Weizhou (威州镇), Xiaozuo (小作镇), Nanzhangcheng (南障城镇), Cangyanshan (苍岩山镇), Ceyu (测鱼镇)

Townships:

- Wujiayao Township (吴家窑乡), Beizheng Township (北正乡), Yujia Township (于家乡), Sunzhuang Township (孙庄乡), Nanxing Township (南陉乡), Xinzhuang Township (辛庄乡), Nanwangzhuang Township (南王庄乡)

=== Lingshou County ===
Towns:

- Lingshou (灵寿镇), Qingtong (青同镇), Tashang (塔上镇), Ciyu (慈峪镇), Chatou (岔头镇), Chenzhuang (陈庄镇)

Townships:

- Sanshengyuan Township (三圣院乡), Beiwa Township (北洼乡), Niucheng Township (牛城乡), Goutai Township (狗台乡), Nanzhai Township (南寨乡), Beitanzhuang Township (北谭庄乡), Zhaitou Township (寨头乡), Nanying Township (南营乡), Nanyanchuan Township (南燕川乡)

=== Luancheng County ===
Towns:

- Luancheng (栾城镇), Qiema (郄马镇), Yehe (冶河镇), Douyu (窦妪镇), Loudi (楼底镇)

Townships:

- Nangao Township (南高乡), Liulintun Township (柳林屯乡), Xiying Township (西营乡)

=== Pingshan County ===
Towns:

- Pingshan (平山镇), Donghuishe (东回舍镇), Wentang (温塘镇), Nandian (南甸镇), Gangnan (岗南镇), Zhongguyue (中古月镇), Xiahuai (下槐镇), Mengjiazhuang (孟家庄镇), Xiaojue (小觉镇), Jiaotanzhuang (蛟潭庄镇), Xibaipo (西柏坡镇), Xiakou (下口镇)

Townships:

- Xidawu Township (西大吾乡), Shangsanji Township (上三汲乡), Lianghe Township (两河乡), Dongwangpo Township (东王坡乡), Sujiazhuang Township (苏家庄乡), Zhaibei Township (宅北乡), Beiye Township (北冶乡), Shangguanyintang Township (上观音堂乡), Yangjiaqiao Township (杨家桥乡), Yingli Township (营里乡), Hehekou Township (合河口乡)

=== Shenze County ===
Towns:

- Shenze (深泽镇), Tiegan (铁杆镇)

Townships:

- Baizhuang Township (白庄乡), Liucun Township (留村乡), Zhaoba Township (赵八乡), Qiaotou Township (桥头乡)

=== Wuji County ===
Towns:

- Wuji (无极镇), Zhangduangu (张段固镇), Beisu (北苏镇), Qiji (七汲镇), Guozhuang (郭庄镇), Dachen (大陈镇)

Townships:

- Donghoufang Township (东侯坊乡), Haozhuang Township (郝庄乡), Lichengdao Township (里城道乡) Nanliu Township (南流乡), Gaotou Hui Ethnic Township (高头回族乡)

=== Xingtang County ===
Towns:

- Longzhou (龙州镇), Nanqiao (南桥镇), Shangbei (上碑镇), Koutou (口头镇)

Townships:

- Duyanggang Township (独羊岗乡), Anxiang Township (安香乡), Zhili Township (只里乡), Shitong Township (市同乡), Diying Township (翟营乡), Chengzhai Township (城寨乡), Shangfang Township (上方乡), Yuting Township (玉亭乡), Beihe Township (北河乡), Shangyanzhuang Township (上阎庄乡), Jiukouzi Township (九口子乡)

=== Yuanshi County ===
The only subdistrict is Chengqu Subdistrict (城区街道)

Towns:

- Huaiyang (槐阳镇), Nanyin (南因镇), Nanzuo (南佐镇), Yincun (因村镇), Jicun (姬村镇), Songcao (宋曹镇)

Townships:

- Dongzhang Township (东张乡), Zhaotong Township (赵同乡), Macun Township (马村乡), Beichu Township (北褚乡), Suyang Township (苏阳乡), Sucun Township (苏村乡), Beizheng Township (北正乡), Qianxian Township (前仙乡), Heishuihe Township (黑水河乡)

=== Zanhuang County ===
Towns:

- Zanhuang (赞皇镇), Yuantou (院头镇)

Townships:

- Nanxingguo Township (南邢郭乡), Nanqinghe Township (南清河乡), Xiyangze Township (西阳泽乡), Huangbeiping Township (黄北坪乡), Xuting Township (许亭乡), Zhangshiyan Township (嶂石岩乡), Zhangleng Township (张楞乡), Xilongmen Township (西龙门乡), Tumen Township (土门乡)

=== Zhao County ===
Towns:

- Zhaozhou (赵州镇), Fanzhuang (范庄镇), Beiwangli (北王里镇), Xinzhaidian (新寨店镇), Hancun (韩村镇), Nanbaishe (南柏舍镇), Shahedian (沙河店镇)

Townships:

- Qiandazhang Township (前大章乡), Xiezhuang Township (谢庄乡), Gaocun Township (高村乡), Wangxizhang Township (王西章乡)

=== Zhengding County ===
Towns:

- Zhengding (正定镇), Zhufutun (诸福屯镇), Xin'an (新安镇), Xinchengpu (新城铺镇)

Townships:

- Xipingle Township (西平乐乡), Nanniu Township (南牛乡), Nanlou Township (南楼乡), Beizaoxian Township (北早现乡), Quyangqiao Township (曲阳桥乡)

== Baoding ==
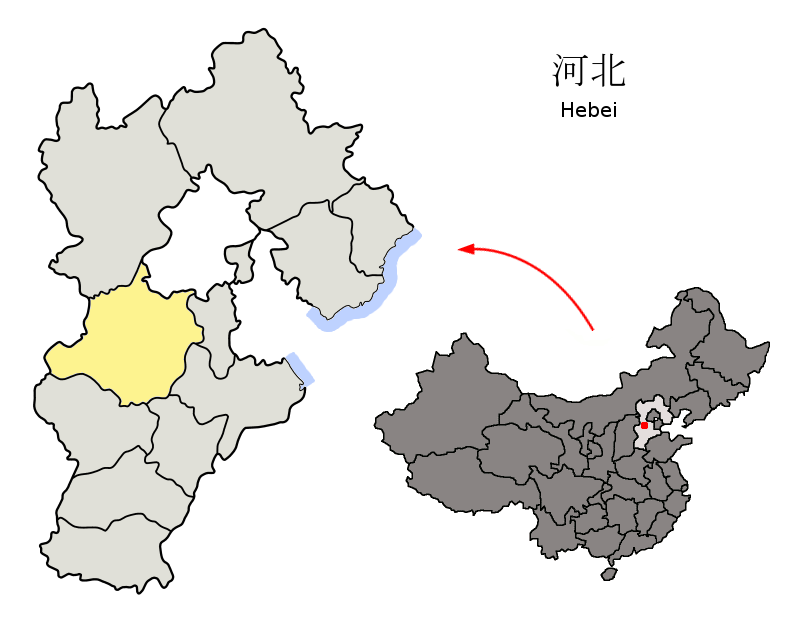
Location of Baoding in the province

=== Beishi District ===
Subdistricts:

- Hepingli Subdistrict (和平里街道), Wusi Road Subdistrict (五四路街道), Xiguan Subdistrict (西关街道), Zhonghua Road Subdistrict (中华路街道), Dongguan Subdistrict (东关街道)

Townships:

- Hanzhuang Township (韩庄乡), Dongjinzhuang Township (东金庄乡), Bailou Township (百楼乡)

=== Nanshi District ===
Subdistricts:

- Lianmeng Subdistrict (联盟街道), Hongxing Subdistrict (红星街道), Yuhua Subdistrict (裕华街道), Yonghua Subdistrict (永华街道), Nanguan Subdistrict (南关街道)

Townships:

- Nandayuan Township (南大园乡), Jiaozhuang Township (焦庄乡), Yangzhuang Township (杨庄乡), Wuyao Township (五尧乡)

=== Xinshi District ===
Subdistricts:

- Xuanfeng Subdistrict (先锋街道), Xinshichang Subdistrict (新市场街道), Dongfeng Subdistrict (东风街道), South Jianshe Road Subdistrict (建设南路街道), North Hancun Road Subdistrict (韩村北路街道)

Townships:

- Jiezhuang Township (颉庄乡), Fuchang Township (富昌乡), Hancun Township (韩村乡), Nanqi Township (南奇乡), Jiangcheng Township (江城乡), Damafang Township (大马坊乡)

=== Anguo ===
Subdistricts:

- Qizhouyaoshi Subdistrict (祁州药市街道)

Towns:

- Qizhou (祁州镇), Wurenqiao (伍仁桥镇), Shifo (石佛镇), Zhengzhang (郑章镇), Xifoluo (西佛落镇), Dawunü (大五女镇)

Townships:

- Mingguandian Township (明官店乡), Nanloudi Township (南娄底乡), Xi'anguocheng Township (西安国城乡), Beiduancun Township (北段村乡)

=== Dingzhou ===
Towns:

- Qingfengdian (清风店镇), Dongting (东亭镇), Liqingu (李亲顾镇), Mingyuedian (明月店镇), Daxinzhuang (大辛庄镇), Xingyi (邢邑镇), Zhuanlu (砖路镇), Liuzao (留早镇), Pangcun (庞村镇), Gaopeng (高蓬镇), Ziwei (子位镇), Dingningdian (叮咛店镇), Dongwang (东旺镇), Kaiyuan (开元镇)

Townships:

- Dongliuchun Township (东留春乡), Zhoucun Township (周村乡), Daluzhuang Township (大鹿庄乡), Yangjiazhuang Township (杨家庄乡), Zhaocun Township (赵村乡), Xicheng Township (西城乡), Xizhong Township (息仲乡), Haotouzhuang Hui Ethnic Township (号头庄回族乡)

=== Gaobeidian ===
Subdistricts:

- Heping Subdistrict (和平街道), Juncheng Subdistrict (军城街道), Dongsheng Subdistrict (东盛街道), Beicheng Subdistrict (北城街道), Xinghua Road Subdistrict (兴华路街道)

Towns:

- Fangguan (方官镇), Xincheng (新城镇), Sizhuang (泗庄镇), Baigou (白沟镇), Xinlizhuang (辛立庄镇)

Townships:

- Xiaoguanying Township (肖官营乡), Liangjiaying Township (梁家营乡), Zhangliuzhuang Township (张六庄乡), Dongmaying Township (东马营乡), Xinqiao Township (辛桥乡)

=== Zhuozhou ===
Subdistricts:

- Shuangta Subdistrict (双塔街道), Taoyuan Subdistrict (桃园街道), Qingliangsi Subdistrict (清凉寺街道)

Towns:

- Songlindian (松林店镇), Matou (码头镇), Dongchengfang (东城坊镇), Gaoguanzhuang (高官庄镇), Dongxianpo (东仙坡镇), Baichigan (百尺竿镇)

Townships:

- Yihezhuang Township (义和庄乡), Lintun Township (林屯乡), Sunzhuang Township (孙庄乡), Douzhuang Township (豆庄乡), Diaowo Township (刁窝乡)

=== Anxin County ===
Towns:

- Anxin Town (安新镇), Dawang (大王镇), Santai (三台镇), Duancun (端村镇), Zhaobeikou (赵北口镇), Tongkou (同口镇), Liulizhuang (刘李庄镇), Anzhou (安州镇), Laohetou (老河头镇)

Townships:

- Quantou Township (圈头乡), Zhaili Township (寨里乡), Luzhuang Township (芦庄乡)

=== Boye County ===
Towns:

- Boye Town (博野镇), Xiaodian (小店镇), Chengwei (程委镇)

Townships:

- Dongxu Township (东墟乡), Beiyangcun Township (北杨村乡), Chengdong Township (城东乡), Nanxiaowang Township (南小王乡)

=== Dingxing County ===
Towns:

- Dingxing Town (定兴镇), Gucheng (固城镇), Xianyu (贤寓镇), Beihe (北河镇), Tiangongsi (天宫寺镇)

Townships:

- Dongluobao Township (东落堡乡), Gaoli Township (高里乡), Zhangjiazhuang Township (张家庄乡), Yaocun Township (姚村乡), Xiaocun Township (肖村乡), Liudiao Township (柳卓乡), Yangcun Township (杨村乡), Beitian Township (北田乡), Beinancai Township (北南蔡乡), Liyuzhuang Township (李郁庄乡), Xiaozhuzhuang Township (小朱庄乡)

=== Fuping County ===
Towns:

- Fuping (阜平镇), Longquanguan (龙泉关镇), Pingyang (平阳镇), Chengnanzhuang (城南庄镇), Tianshengqiao (天生桥镇)

Townships:

- Wanglinkou Township (王林口乡), Taiyu Township (台峪乡), Datai Township (大台乡), Shijiazhai Township (史家寨乡), Shawo Township (砂窝乡), Wuwangkou Township (吴王口乡), Xiazhuang Township (下庄乡), Beiguoyuan Township (北果元乡)

=== Gaoyang County ===
Towns:

- Gaoyang (高阳镇), Pangkou (庞口镇), Xiyan (西演镇), Xingjianan (邢家南镇)

Townships:

- Jinzhuang Township (晋庄乡), Pukou Township (蒲口乡), Xiaowangguozhuang Township (小王果庄乡), Longhua Township (龙化乡), Pangjiazhuang Township (庞家佐乡)

=== Laishui County ===
Towns:

- Laishui Town (涞水镇), Yi'an (义安镇), Shiting (石亭镇), Zhaogezhuang (赵各庄镇), Yongyang (永阳镇), Sanpo (三坡镇), Jiulong (九龙镇)

Townships:

- Longmen Township (龙门乡), Qizhongkou Township (其中口乡), Songgezhuang Township (宋各庄乡), Hujiazhuang Township (胡家庄乡), Mingyi Township (明义乡), Wangcun Township (王村乡), Dongwenshan Township (东文山乡), Loucun Manchu Ethnic Township (娄村满族乡)

=== Laiyuan County ===
Towns:

- Laiyuan (涞源镇), Yinfang (银坊镇), Zoumayi (走马驿镇), Shuibao (水堡镇), Wang'an (王安镇), Yangjiazhuang (杨家庄镇), Baishishan (白石山镇)

Townships:

- Nandun Township (南屯乡), Nanmazhuang Township (南马庄乡), Beishifo Township (北石佛乡), Jinjiajing Township (金家井乡), Liujiazhuang Township (留家庄乡), Shangzhuang Township (上庄乡), Dongtuanbao Township (东团堡乡), Tayayi Township (塔崖驿乡), Wulonggou Township (乌龙沟乡), Yanmeidong Township (烟煤洞乡)

=== Li County ===
Towns:

- Liwu (蠡吾镇), Liushi (留史镇), Dabaichi (大百尺镇), Xinxing (辛兴镇), Beiguodan (北郭丹镇), Wan'an (万安镇), Sangyuan (桑园镇), Nanzhuang (南庄镇)

Townships:

- Xiaochen Township (小陈乡), Linbao Township (林堡乡), Beiniantou Township (北埝头乡), Baoxu Township (鲍墟乡), Daquti Township (大曲堤乡)

=== Mancheng County ===
Subdistricts:

- Huiyang Subdistrict (惠阳街道)

Towns:

- Mancheng Town (满城镇), Daceying (大册营镇), Shenxing (神星镇), Nanhancun (南韩村镇), Fangshunqiao (方顺桥镇)

Townships:

- Yujiazhuang Township (于家庄乡), Xiantai Township (贤台乡), Yaozhuang Township (要庄乡), Bailong Township (白龙乡), Shijing Township (石井乡), Tuonan Township (坨南乡), Liujiatai Township (刘家台乡)

=== Qingyuan County ===
Towns:

- Qingyuan (清苑镇), Ranzhuang (冉庄镇), Yangcheng (阳城镇), Weicun (魏村镇), Wenren (温仁镇), Zhangdeng (张登镇), Dazhuang (大庄镇), Zangcun (臧村镇)

Townships:

- Baituan Township (白团乡), Beidian Township (北店乡), Shiqiao Township (石桥乡), Lizhuang Township (李庄乡), Beiwangli Township (北王力乡), Donglü Township (东吕乡), Heqiao Township (何桥乡), Suncun Township (孙村乡), Yanzhuang Township (阎庄乡), Wangting Township (望亭乡)

=== Quyang County ===
Towns:

- Hengzhou (恒州镇), Lingshan (灵山镇), Yanzhao (燕赵镇), Yangping (羊平镇), Wende (文德镇)

Townships:

- Luzhuangzi Township (路庄子乡), Xiahe Township (下河乡), Zhuangke Township (庄窠乡), Xiaomu Township (孝墓乡), Dongwang Township (东旺乡), Xiaolin Township (晓林乡), Dicun Township (邸村乡), Chande Township (产德乡), Qicun Township (齐村乡), Dangcheng Township (党城乡), Langjiazhuang Township (郎家庄乡), Fanjiazhuang Township (范家庄乡), Beitai Township (北台乡)

=== Rongcheng County ===
Towns:

- Rongcheng (容城镇), Xiaoli (小里镇), Nanzhang (南张镇), Dahe (大河镇), Liangmatai (晾马台镇)

Townships:

- Bayu Township (八于乡), Jiaguang Township (贾光乡), Pingwang Township (平王乡)

=== Shunping County ===
Towns:

- Puyang (蒲阳镇), Gaoyupu (高于铺镇), Yaoshan (腰山镇)

Townships:

- Pushang Township (蒲上乡), Baiyun Township (白云乡), Hekou Township (河口乡), Anyang Township (安阳乡), Taiyu Township (台鱼乡), Dabei Township (大悲乡), Shennan Township (神南乡)

=== Tang County ===
Towns:

- Renhou (仁厚镇), Wangjing (王京镇), Gaochang (高昌镇), Beiluo (北罗镇), Baihe (白合镇), Juncheng (军城镇), Chuanli (川里镇)

Townships:

- Changgucheng Township (长古城乡), Duting Township (都亭乡), Nandiantou Township (南店头乡), Beidiantou Township (北店头乡), Luozhuang Township (罗庄乡), Baoshui Township (雹水乡), Dayang Township (大洋乡), Micheng Township (迷城乡), Qijiazhuang Township (齐家佐乡), Yangjiao Township (羊角乡), Shimen Township (石门乡), Huangshikou Township (黄石口乡), Daomaguan Township (倒马关乡)

=== Wangdu County ===
Towns:

- Wangdu Town (望都镇), Gudian (固店镇)

Townships:

- Sizhuang Township (寺庄乡), Zhaozhuang Township (赵庄乡), Heibao Township (黑堡乡), Gaoling Township (高岭乡), Zhonghanzhuang Township (中韩庄乡), Jiacun Township (贾村乡)

=== Xiong County ===
Towns:

- Xiongzhou (雄州镇), Zangang (昝岗镇), Daying (大营镇)

Townships:

- Longwan Township (龙湾乡), Zhugezhuang Township (朱各庄乡), Mijiawu Township (米家务乡), Shuangtang Township (双堂乡), Zhanggang Township (张岗乡), Beishakou Township (北沙口乡)

=== Xushui County ===
Towns:

- Ansu (安肃镇), Cuizhuang (崔庄镇), Dayin (大因镇), Suicheng (遂城镇), Gaolincun (高林村镇), Dawangdian (大王店镇), Caohe (漕河镇)

Townships:

- Dongshiduan Township (东史端乡), Liucun Township (留村乡), Zhengcun Township (正村乡), Humi Township (户木乡), Puhe Township (瀑河乡), Dongfushan Township (东釜山乡), Yilianzhuang Township (义联庄乡)

=== Yi County ===
Towns:

- Yizhou (易州镇), Luangezhuang (梁格庄镇), Xiling (西陵镇), Peishan (裴山镇), Tanghu (塘湖镇), Langyashan (狼牙山镇), Lianggang (良岗镇), Zijingguan (紫荆关镇)

Townships:

- Qiaotou Township (桥头乡), Baima Township (白马乡), Liujing Township (流井乡), Gaocun Township (高村乡), Gaomo Township (高陌乡), Dalonghua Township (大龙华乡), Angezhuang Township (安格庄乡), Xishanbei Township (西山北乡), Weidu Township (尉都乡), Dule Township (独乐乡), Qiyu Township (七峪乡), Fugang Township (富岗乡), Pocang Township (坡仓乡), Niugang Township (牛岗乡), Qiaojiahe Township (桥家河乡), Ganhejing Township (甘河净乡), Caijiayu Township (蔡家峪乡), Nanchengsi Township (南城司乡), Lingyunce Hui and Manchu Ethnic Township (凌云册回族满族乡)

== Cangzhou ==
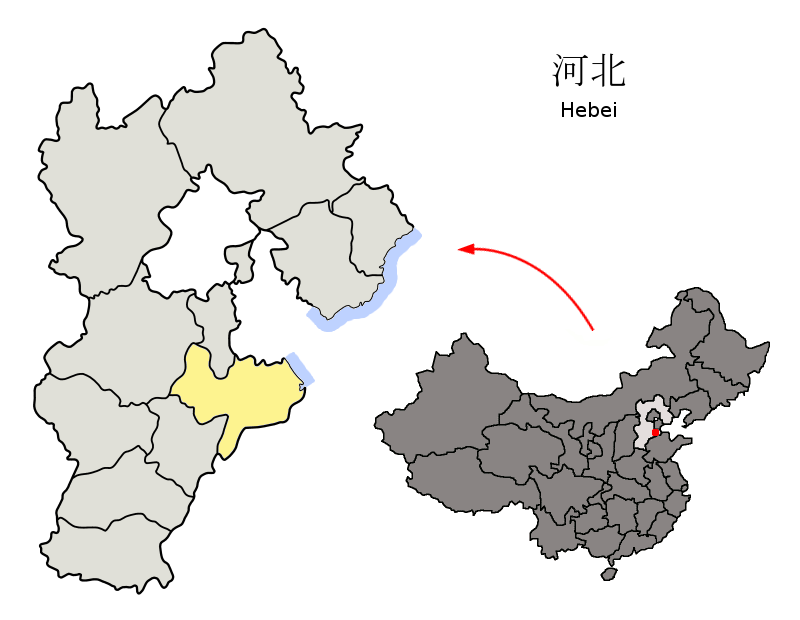
Location of Cangzhou in the province

=== Xinhua District ===
Subdistricts:

- North Jianshe Avenue Subdistrict (建设北街街道), Chezhan Subdistrict (车站街道), Nanda Avenue Subdistrict (南大街街道), Donghuan Subdistrict (东环街道), Daodong Subdistrict (道东街道)

The only township is Xiaozhaozhuang Township (小赵庄乡)

=== Yunhe District ===
Subdistricts:

- Shuiyuesi Subdistrict (水月寺街道), Central Nanhuan Road Subdistrict (南环中路街道), Nanhu Subdistrict (南湖街道), Shichang Subdistrict (市场街道), Central Xihuan Avenue Subdistrict (西环中街街道), Gongyuan Subdistrict (公园街道)

The only town is Xiaowangzhuang (小王庄镇), and the only township is Nanchentun Township (南陈屯乡)

=== Botou ===
Subdistricts:

- Jiefang Subdistrict (解放街道), Hedong Subdistrict (河东街道), Gulou Subdistrict (古楼街道)

Towns:

- Bozhen (泊镇镇), Jiaohe (交河镇), Qiqiao (齐桥镇), Simencun (寺门村镇), Haocun (郝村镇), Fuzhen (富镇镇), Wenmiao (文庙镇), Waliwang (洼里王镇)

Townships:

- Wangwuzhuang Township (王武庄乡), Yingzi Township (营子乡), Siying Township (四营乡), Xixindian Township (西辛店乡)

=== Hejian ===
Subdistricts:

- Yingzhoulu Subdistrict (瀛州路街道)
- Chengyuanxilu Subdistrict (城垣西路街道)

Towns:

- Migezhuang (米各庄镇)
- Jinghe (景和镇)
- Wofotang (卧佛堂镇)
- Shucheng (束城镇)
- Liugusi (留古寺镇)
- Shaheqiao (沙河桥镇)
- Shijingcun (诗经村镇)

Townships:

- Guxian (故仙乡)
- Liminju (黎民居乡)
- Xingcun (兴村乡)
- Shawa (沙洼乡)
- Xijiuji (西九吉乡)
- Beishicao (北石槽乡)
- Shicun (时村乡)
- Hangbieying (行别营乡)
- Zunzuzhuang (尊祖庄乡)
- Longhuadian (龙华店乡)
- Guoziwa Huizu Township (果子洼回族乡)

=== Huanghua ===
Subdistricts:

- Huazhong Subdistrict (骅中街道), Huadong Subdistrict (骅东街道), Huaxi Subdistrict (骅西街道)

Towns:

- Huanghua, Huanghua (黄骅镇), Nanpaihe (南排河镇), Jiucheng (旧城镇), Lüqiao (吕桥镇)

Townships:

- Guanzhuang Township (官庄乡), Changguo Township (常郭乡), Qijiawu Township (齐家务乡), Tengzhuangzi Township (滕庄子乡), Yang'erzhuang Hui Ethnic Township (羊二庄回族乡), Xincun Hui Ethnic Township (新村回族乡), Yangsanmu Hui Ethnic Township (羊三木回族乡)

=== Renqiu ===
Subdistricts:

- Xinhua Road Subdistrict (新华路街道), Xihuan Road Subdistrict (西环路街道), Yongfeng Road Subdistrict (永丰路街道)

Towns:

- Chu'an (出岸镇), Shimenqiao (石门桥镇), Lübaogong (吕公堡镇), Changfeng (长丰镇), Mofuzhou (莫阝州镇), Gougezhuang (苟各庄镇), Liangzhao (梁召镇), Xinzhongyi (辛中驿镇)

Townships:

- Yilunbao Township (议论堡乡), Qingta Township (青塔乡), Beixinzhuang Township (北辛庄乡), Qijianfang Township (七间房乡), Beihan Township (北汉乡), Yucun Township (于村乡), Majiawu Township (麻家坞乡)

=== Cang County ===
Towns:

- Xingji (兴济镇), Jiuzhou (旧州镇), Dusheng (杜生镇), Cui'erzhuang (崔尔庄镇)

Townships:

- Zhangguantun Township (张官屯乡), Wangjiapu Township (汪家铺乡), Wulongtang Township (仵龙堂乡), Liujiamiao Township (刘家庙乡), Fenghuadian Township (风化店乡), Yaoguantun Township (姚官屯乡), Daguanting Township (大官厅乡), Gaochuan Township (高川乡), Huangdipu Township (黄递铺乡), Zhifangtou Township (纸房头乡), Xueguantun Township (薛官屯乡), Jiedi Hui Ethnic Township (捷地回族乡), Dulin Hui Ethnic Township (杜林回族乡), Litianmu Hui Ethnic Township (李天木回族乡), Dazhecun Hui Ethnic Township (大褚村回族乡)

=== Dongguang County ===
Towns:

- Dongguang (东光镇), Lianzhen (连镇镇), Zhaowang (找王镇), Qincun (秦村镇), Dengmingsi (灯明寺镇), Nanxiakou (南霞口镇), Dadan (大单镇)

Townships:

- Longwali Township (龙王李乡), Yuqiao Township (于桥乡)

=== Haixing County ===
Towns:

- Suji (苏基镇), Xinji (辛集镇), Gaowan (高湾镇)

Townships:

- Zhaomaotao Township (赵毛陶乡), Xiangfang Township (香坊乡), Xiaoshan Township (小山乡), Zhanghuiting Township (张会亭乡)

=== Mengcun Hui Autonomous County ===
Towns:

- Mengcun (孟村镇), Xinxian (新县镇), Xindian (辛店镇), Gaozhai (高寨镇)

Townships:

- Songzhuangzi Township (宋庄子乡), Niujinzhuang Township (牛进庄乡)

=== Nanpi County ===
Towns:

- Nanpi (南皮镇), Fengjiakou (冯家口镇), Zhaizi (寨子镇), Baoguantun (鲍官屯镇), Wangsi (王寺镇), Wumaying (乌马营镇)

Townships:

- Dalangdian Township (大浪淀乡), Liubali Township (刘八里乡), Luguan Township (潞灌乡)

=== Qing County ===
Towns:

- Qingzhou (清州镇), Jinniu (金牛镇), Xinxing (新兴镇), Liuhe (流河镇), Mumendian (木门店镇), Machang (马厂镇)

Townships:

- Zhouguantun Township (周官屯乡), Caosi Township (曹寺乡), Pangu Township (盘古乡), Chenzui Township (陈嘴乡)

=== Suning County ===
Towns:

- Suning (肃宁镇), Liangjiacun (梁家村镇), Wobei (窝北镇), Shangcun (尚村镇), Wanli (万里镇)

Townships:

- Shisuo Township (师素乡), Hebeiliushansi Township (河北留善寺乡), Fujiazuo Township (付家佐乡), Shaozhuang Township (邵庄乡)

=== Wuqiao County ===
Towns:

- Sangyuan (桑园镇), Tiecheng (铁城镇), Yuji (于集镇), Liangji (梁集镇), Anling (安陵镇)

Townships:

- Caojiawa Township (曹家洼乡), Songmen Township (宋门乡), Yangjiasi Township (杨家寺乡), Goudianpu Township (沟店铺乡), Hezhuang Township (何庄乡)

=== Xian County ===
Towns:

- Leshou (乐寿镇), Huaizhen (淮镇镇), Guozhuang (郭庄镇), Hechengjie (河城街镇), Hancun (韩村镇), Monan (陌南镇), Chenzhuang (陈庄镇)

Townships:

- Xuliugao Township (徐留高乡), Shanglin Township (商林乡), Duancun Township (段村乡), Zhangcun Township (张村乡), Linhe Township (临河乡), Xiaopingwang Township (小平王乡), Shiwuji Township (十五级乡), Leitou Township (垒头乡), Nanhetou Township (南河头乡), Xicheng Township (西城乡), Benzhai Hui Ethnic Township (本斋回族乡)

=== Yanshan County ===
Towns:

- Yanshan (盐山镇), Wangshu (望树镇), Hanji (韩集镇), Shengfo (圣佛镇), Qingyun (庆云镇), Qiantong (千童镇)

Townships:

- Bianwu Township (边务乡), Xiaoying Township (小营乡), Mengdian Township (孟店乡), Xiaozhuang Township (小庄乡), Yangji Township (杨集乡), Changzhuang Township (常庄乡)

== Chengde ==
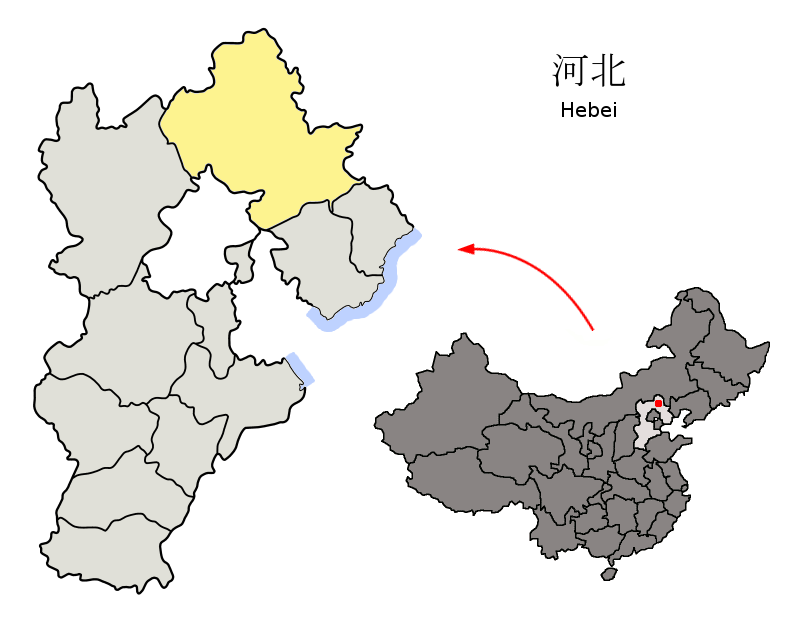
Location of Chengde in the province

=== Shuangluan District ===
Subdistricts:

- Yuanbaoshan Subdistrict (元宝山街道), Gangcheng Subdistrict (钢城街道)

Towns:

- Shuangtashan (双塔山镇), Luanhe (滦河镇), Damiao (大庙镇), Pianqiaozi (偏桥子镇)

Townships:

- Chenzhazi Township (陈栅子乡), Xidi Manchu Ethnic Township (西地满族乡)

=== Shuangqiao District ===
Subdistricts:

- Xida Avenue Subdistrict (西大街街道), Toudaopailou Subdistrict (头道牌楼街道), Panjiagou Subdistrict (潘家沟街道), Zhonghua Road Subdistrict (中华路街道), Xinhua Road Subdistrict (新华路街道), Shidongzigou Subdistrict (石洞子沟街道), Qiaodong Subdistrict (桥东街道)

Towns:

- Shuiquangou (水泉沟镇), Shizigou (狮子沟镇), Niuquanzigou (牛圈子沟镇), Dashimiao (大石庙镇), Fengyingzi (冯营子镇)

=== Yingshouyingzi Mining District ===
Towns:

- Wangjiazhuang (汪家庄镇), Yingshouyingzi Town (鹰手营子镇), Shouwangfen (寿王坟镇), Beimaquanzi (北马圈子镇)

=== Chengde County ===
Towns:

- Xiabancheng (下板城镇), Shangbancheng (上板城镇), Jiashan (甲山镇), Liugou (六沟镇), Sangou (三沟镇), Tougou (头沟镇), Gaositai (高寺台镇), Shuangfengsi (双峰寺镇)

Townships:

- Dongxiaobaiqi Township (东小白旗乡), Anjiang Township (鞍匠乡), Liuzhangzi Township (刘杖子乡), Xinzhangzi Township (新杖子乡), Mengjiayuan Township (孟家院乡), Dayingzi Township (大营子乡), Bajia Township (八家乡), Shanggu Township (上谷乡), Manzhangzi Township (满杖子乡), Shihuiyao Township (石灰窑乡), Wudaohe Township (五道河乡), Chagou Township (岔沟乡), Dengshan Township (磴上乡), Sanjia Township (三家乡), Cangzi Township (仓子乡), Gangzi Manchu Ethnic Township (岗子满族乡), Liangjia Manchu Ethnic Township (两家满族乡)

=== Fengning Manchu Autonomous County ===
Towns:

- Dage (大阁镇), Datan (大滩镇), Yu'ershan (鱼儿山镇), Tucheng (土城镇), Huangqi (黄旗镇), Fengshan (凤山镇), Boluonuo (波罗诺镇), Heishanju (黑山咀镇), Tianqiao (天桥镇)

Townships:

- Wanshengyong Township (万胜永乡), Sichakou Township (四岔口乡), Sujiadian Township (苏家店乡), Waigoumen Township (外沟门乡), Caoyuan Township (草原乡), Kulongshan Township (窟窿山乡), Xiaobazi Township (小坝子乡), Wudaoying Township (五道营乡), Xuanjiangying Township (选将营乡), Xiguanying Township (西官营乡), Wangying Township (王营乡), Beitouying Township (北头营乡), Hulinying Township (胡麻营乡), Shirengou Township (石人沟乡), Tanghe Township (汤河乡), Yangmuzhazi Township (杨木栅子乡), Nanguan Mongol Ethnic Township (南关蒙古族乡)

=== Kuancheng Manchu Autonomous County ===
Towns:

- Kuancheng (宽城镇), Longxumen (龙须门镇), Yu'erya (峪耳崖镇), Bancheng (板城镇), Tangdaohe (汤道河镇), Boluotai (饽罗台镇), Nianziyu (碾子峪镇)

Townships:

- Huapiliuzi Township (化皮溜子乡), Tashan Township (塌山乡), Mengziling Township (孟子岭乡), Dushigou Township (独石沟乡), Dongdadi Township (东大地乡), Huajian Township (铧尖乡), Donghuanghuachuan Township (东黄花川乡), Liangjiatai Township (亮甲台乡), Weizigou Township (苇子沟乡), Dazigoumen Township (大字沟门乡), Dashizhuzi Township (大石柱子乡)

=== Longhua County ===
Towns:

- Longhua (隆化镇), Hanmaying (韩麻营镇), Zhongguan (中关镇), Qijia (七家镇), Tangtougou (汤头沟镇), Zhangsanying (张三营镇), Tangsanying (唐三营镇), Lanqi (蓝旗镇), Bugugou (步古沟镇), Guojiatun (郭家屯镇)

Townships:

- Huangdi Township (荒地乡), Zhangjiying Township (章吉营乡), Maojingba Township (茅荆坝乡), Shanwan Township (山湾乡), Jianfang Township (碱房乡), Hanjiadian Township (韩家店乡), Wangoumen Township (湾沟门乡), Yinjiaying Manchu Ethnic Township (尹家营满族乡), Miaozigou Mongol and Manchu Ethnic Township (庙子沟蒙古族满族乡), Pianpoying Manchu Ethnic Township (偏坡营满族乡), Badaying Mongol Ethnic Township (八达营蒙古族乡), Taipingzhuang Manchu Ethnic Township (太平庄满族乡), Jiutun Manchu Ethnic Township (旧屯满族乡), Xi'achao Manchu and Mongol Ethnic Township (西阿超满族蒙古族乡), Baihugou Manchu and Mongol Ethnic Township (白虎沟满族蒙古族乡)

=== Luanping County ===
The only subdistrict is Zhongxing Road Subdistrict (中兴路街道)

Towns:

- Luanping (滦平镇), Changshanyu (长山峪镇), Hongqi (红旗镇), Jingoutun (金沟屯镇), Hushiha (虎什哈镇), Bakeshiying (巴克什营镇), Zhangbaiwan (张百湾镇)

Townships:

- Fuyingzi Township (付营子乡), Huodoushan Township (火斗山乡), Liangjianfang Township (两间房乡), Laowa Township (涝洼乡), Pingfang Manchu Ethnic Township (平坊满族乡), Anchungoumen Manchu Ethnic Township (安纯沟门满族乡), Xiaoying Manchu Ethnic Township (小营满族乡), Xigou Manchu Ethnic Township (西沟满族乡), Dengchang Manchu Ethnic Township (邓厂满族乡), Wudaoyingzi Manchu Ethnic Township (五道营子满族乡), Mayingzi Ethnic Township (马营子满族乡), Fujiadian Manchu Ethnic Township (付家店满族乡), Datun Manchu Ethnic Township (大屯满族乡)

=== Pingquan County ===
Towns:

- Pingquan (平泉镇), Huangtuliangzi (黄土梁子镇), Yushulinzi (榆树林子镇), Yangshuling (杨树岭镇), Qigou (七沟镇), Xiaosigou (小寺沟镇), Dangba (党坝镇), Wolong (卧龙镇), Nanwudajiazi (南五十家子镇), Beiwudajiazi (北五十家子镇)

Townships:

- Wangtufang Township (王土房乡), Taitoushan Township (台头山乡), Songshutai Township (松树台乡), Daohugou Township (道虎沟乡), Liuxi Manchu Ethnic Township (柳溪满族乡), Qijiadai Manchu Ethnic Township (七家岱满族乡), Pingfang Manchu and Mongol Ethnic Township (平房满族蒙古族乡), Maolangou Manchu and Mongol Ethnic Township (茅兰沟满族蒙古族乡), Guozhangzi Manchu Ethnic Township (郭杖子满族乡)

=== Weichang Manchu and Mongol Autonomous County ===
Towns:

- Weichang (围场镇), Siheyong (四合永镇), Kelegou (克勒沟镇), Qipanshan (棋盘山镇), Banjieta (半截塔镇), Chaoyangdi (朝阳地镇), Chaoyangwan (朝阳湾镇)

Townships:

- Daobazi Township (道坝子乡), Longtoushan Township (龙头山乡), Yaozhan Township (腰站乡), Huangtukan Township (黄土坎乡), Sidaogou Township (四道沟乡), Lanqikalun Township (兰旗卡伦乡), Yinwogou Township (银窝沟乡), Xindi Township (新地乡), Guangfayong Township (广发永乡), Yutaihe Township (育太和乡), Guojiawan Township (郭家湾乡), Yangjiawan Township (杨家湾乡), Dahuanqi Township (大唤起乡), Haliha Township (哈里哈乡), Xinbo Township (新拨乡), Zhangjiawan Township (张家湾乡), Baoyuanzhan Township (宝元栈乡), Shanwanzi Township (山湾子乡), Sanyiyong Township (三义永乡), Jiangjiadian Township (姜家店乡), Xiahuofang Township (下伙房乡), Yangebai Township (燕格柏乡), Pailou Township (牌楼乡), Chengzi Township (城子乡), Laowopu Township (老窝铺乡), Yudaokou Township (御道口乡), Shizhuozi Township (石桌子乡), Datoushan Township (大头山乡), Nanshanzui Township (南山嘴乡), Xilongtou Township (西龙头乡)

=== Xinglong County ===
Towns:

- Xinglong (兴隆镇), Liudaohe (六道河镇), Gualanyu (挂兰峪镇), Banbishan (半壁山镇), Ping'anbao (平安堡镇), Beiyingfang (北营房镇), Qingsongling (青松岭镇), Gushanzi (孤山子镇), Lanqiying (蓝旗营镇)

Townships:

- Xiataizi Township (下台子乡), Dazhangzi Township (大杖子乡), Beishuiquan Township (北水泉乡), Douziyu Township (陡子峪乡), Sandaohe Township (三道河乡), Dashuiquan Township (大水泉乡), Moguyu Township (蘑菇峪乡), Shangshidong Township (上石洞乡), Anziling Township (安子岭乡), Nantian Manchu Ethnic Township (南天门满族乡), Bagualing Manchu Ethnic Township (八卦岭满族乡)

== Handan ==
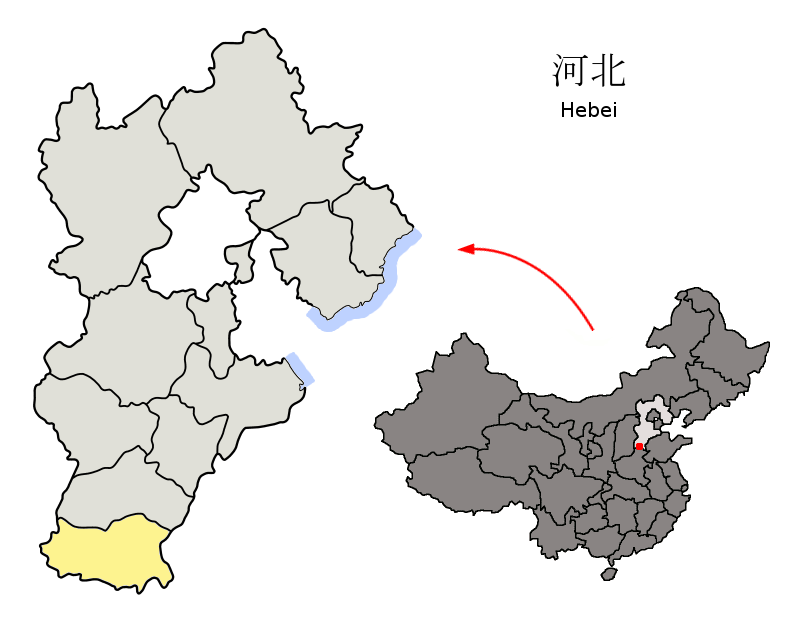
Location of Handan in the province

=== Congtai District ===
Subdistricts:

- Renmin Road Subdistrict (人民路街道), Zhonghua Subdistrict (中华街道), East Congtai Subdistrict (丛台东街道), West Congtai Subdistrict (丛台西街道), Guangmingqiao Subdistrict (光明桥街道), Qinhe Subdistrict (沁河街道), Heping Subdistrict (和平街道), Liulinqiao Subdistrict (柳林桥街道), East Lianfang Subdistrict (联纺东街道), West Lianfang Subdistrict (联纺西街道)

The only township is Sucao Township (苏曹乡).

=== Fengfeng Mining District ===
Towns:

- Linshui (临水镇), Fengfeng Town (峰峰镇), Xinpo (新坡镇), Dashe (大社镇), Hecun (和村镇), Yijing (义井镇), Pengcheng (彭城镇), Jiecheng (界城镇), Dayu (大峪镇)

=== Fuxing District ===
Subdistricts:

- Shengliqiao Subdistrict (胜利桥街道), Pangcun Subdistrict (庞村街道), Tieludayuan Subdistrict (铁路大院街道), Shihua Subdistrict (石化街道), Hualin Road Subdistrict (化林路街道), Erliuqisan Subdistrict (二六七二街道), Baijiacun Subdistrict (百家村街道)

The only township is Pengjiazhai Township (彭家寨乡)

=== Hanshan District ===
Subdistricts:

- Huomo Subdistrict (火磨街道), Lingyuan Road Subdistrict (陵园路街道), Guangming Road Subdistrict (光明路街道), Fudong Subdistrict (滏东街道), Luochengtou Subdistrict (罗城头街道), Zhuhe Road Subdistrict (渚河路街道), Yuxinnan Subdistrict (浴新南街道), Nonglin Road Subdistrict (农林路街道), Maodong Subdistrict (贸东街道), Maoxi Subdistrict (贸西街道)

Towns:

- Matou (马头镇), Beizhangzhuang (北张庄镇)

The only township is Mazhuang Township (马庄乡)

=== Wu'an ===
Towns:

- Wu'an Town (武安镇), Kang'ercheng (康二城镇), Niuji (午汲镇), Cishan (磁山镇), Boyan (伯延镇), Shucun (淑村镇), Datong (大同镇), Yicheng (邑城镇), Kuangshan (矿山镇), Hejin (贺进镇), Yangyi (阳邑镇), Paihui (徘徊镇), Yetao (冶陶镇)

Townships:

- Shangtuancheng Township (上团城乡), Bei'anzhuang Township (北安庄乡), Bei'anle Township (北安乐乡), Xitushan Township (西土山乡), Xisizhuang Township (西寺庄乡), Huoshui Township (活水乡), Shidong Township (石洞乡), Guantao Township (管陶乡), Majiazhuang Township (马家庄乡)

=== Cheng'an County ===
Towns:

- Cheng'an (成安镇), Shangcheng (商城镇), Zhanghedian (漳河店镇), Lijiatuan (李家疃镇)

Townships:

- Xinyi Township (辛义乡), Baisiying Township (柏寺营乡), Daodongbao Township (道东堡乡), Beixiangyi Township (北乡义乡), Changxiang Township (长巷乡)

=== Ci County ===
Towns:

- Cizhou (磁州镇), Xiguanglu (西光录镇), Gaoyu (高臾镇), Yuecheng (岳城镇), Guantai (观台镇), Lintan (林坦镇), Huangsha (黄沙镇), Baitu (白土镇), Jiangwucheng (讲武城镇)

Townships:

- Lucunying Township (路村营乡), Guyi Township (固义乡), Xinzhuangying Township (辛庄营乡), Huaguanying Township (花官营乡), Shicunying Township (时村营乡), Nancheng Township (南城乡), Taicheng Township (台城乡), Taoquan Township (陶泉乡), Dudang Township (都党乡), Jiabi Township (贾璧乡)

=== Daming County ===
Towns:

- Daming (大名镇), Yangqiao (杨桥镇), Wanti (万堤镇), Longwangmiao (龙王庙镇), Shuguan (束馆镇), Jintan (金滩镇)

Townships:

- Shageta Township (沙圪塔乡), Wangcun Township (王村乡), Pushang Township (铺上乡), Huangjinti Township (黄金堤乡), Dajie Township (大街乡), Jiuye Township (旧治乡), Ximuzhuang Township (西未庄乡), Sungandian Township (孙甘店乡), Xifuji Township (西付集乡), Niantou Township (埝头乡), Beifeng Township (北峰乡), Zhangji Township (张集乡), Hongmiao Township (红庙乡), Yingzhen Hui Ethnic Township (营镇回族乡)

=== Feixiang County ===
Towns:

- Feixiang (肥乡镇), Tiantaishan (天台山镇)

Townships:

- Daxihan Township (大西韩乡), Xin'anzhen Township (辛安镇乡), Maoyanbao Township (毛演堡乡), Yuangu Township (元固乡), Tunzhuangying Township (屯庄营乡), Dongzhangbao Township (东漳堡乡), Jiudian Township (旧店乡)

=== Guangping County ===
Towns:

- Guangping (广平镇), Pinggudian (平固店镇), Shengying (胜营镇)

Townships:

- Dongzhangmeng Township (东张孟乡), Shilipu Township (十里铺乡), Nanyangbao Township (南阳堡乡), Nanhancun Township (南韩村乡)

=== Guantao County ===
Towns:

- Guantao (馆陶镇), Weisengzhai (魏僧寨镇), Fangzhai (房寨镇), Zibao (柴堡镇)

Townships:

- Nanxucun Township (南徐村乡), Luqiao Township (路桥乡), Wangqiao Township (王桥乡), Shoushansi Township (寿山寺乡)

=== Handan County ===
Towns:

- Hucun (户村镇), Beizhangzhuang (北张庄镇), Shangbi (尚璧镇), Heshazhen (河沙镇镇), Huangliangmeng (黄粱梦镇)

Townships:

- Sanling Township (三陵乡), Daizhao Township (代召乡), Nanlügu Township (南吕固乡), Nanbao Township (南堡乡), Jianzhuang Township (兼庄乡), Kangzhuang Township (康庄乡)

=== Jize County ===
Towns:

- Jize (鸡泽镇), Xiaozhai (小寨镇), Shuangta (双塔镇)

Townships:

- Fengzheng Township (风正乡), Wuguanying Township (吴官营乡), Futudian Township (浮图店乡), Caozhuang Township (曹庄乡)

=== Linzhang County ===
Towns:

- Linzhang (临漳镇), Nandongfang (南东坊镇), Suntaoji (孙陶集镇), Liuyuan (柳园镇), Chenggouji (称勾集镇)

Townships:

- Diqiu Township (狄邱乡), Zhangcunji Township (张村集乡), Xiyanggao Township (西羊羔乡), Xiangcaiying Township (香菜营乡), Ducunji Township (杜村集乡), Zhangliji Township (章里集乡), Xiwen Township (习文乡), Zhuanzhaiying Township (砖寨营乡), Baiheji Township (柏鹤集乡)

=== Qiu County ===
Towns:

- Xinmatou (新马头镇), Qiucheng (邱城镇)

Townships: Danzhai Township (旦寨乡), Nanxindian Township (南辛店乡), Xiangchenggu Township (香城固乡), Liang'erzhuang Township (梁二庄乡), Chencun Hui Ethnic Township (陈村回族乡)

=== Quzhou County ===
Towns:

- Hebei (曲周镇), Anzhai (安寨镇), Henantuan (河南疃镇), Houcun (侯村镇), Disituan (第四疃镇)

Townships:

- Dahedao Township (大河道乡), Baizhai Township (白寨乡), Yizhuang Township (依庄乡), Nanliyue Township (南里岳乡), Huaiqiao Township (槐桥乡)

=== She County ===
Towns:

- Shecheng (涉城镇), Guxin (固新镇), Henandian (河南店镇), Gengle (更乐镇), Xida (西达镇), Xixu (西戍镇), Suobao (索堡镇), Jiangdian (井店镇), Piancheng (偏城镇)

Townships:

- Mujing Township (木井乡), Longhu Township (龙虎乡), Liaocheng Township (辽城乡), Guanfang Township (关防乡), Hezhang Township (合漳乡), Shentou Township (神头乡), Piandian Township (偏店乡), Lutou Township (鹿头乡)

=== Wei County, Handan ===
Towns:

- Weicheng (魏城镇), Dezheng (德政镇), Huilong (回隆镇), Beiyao (北皋镇), Shuangjing (双井镇), Yali (牙里镇), Chewang (车往镇)

Townships:

- Damacun Township (大马村乡), Daxinzhuang Township (大辛庄乡), Damo Township (大磨乡), Dongdaigu Township (东代固乡), Beitaitou Township (北台头乡), Renwangji Township (仁望集乡), Bianma Township (边马乡), Shakouji Township (沙口集乡), Jizhenzhai Township (棘针寨乡), Yehuguai Township (野胡拐乡), Yuanbao Township (院堡乡), Nanshuangmiao Township (南双庙乡), Bokou Township (泊口乡), Zhang'erzhuang Township (张二庄乡)

=== Yongnian County ===
Towns:

- Linluoguan (临洺关镇), Dabeiwang (大北汪镇), Guangfu (广府镇), Yonghehui (永合会镇), Nanyancun (南沿村镇), Zhangxibao (张西堡镇)

Townships:

- Xiaolongma Township (小龙马乡), Xiaoxibao Township (小西堡乡), Zhengxi Township (正西乡), Dongyangzhuang Township (东杨庄乡), Xiyangcheng Township (西阳城乡), Xisu Township (西苏乡), Xihezhuang Township (西河庄乡), Qumo Township (曲陌乡), Liuhan Township (刘汉乡), Jiangwu Township (讲武乡), Liuying Township (刘营乡), Xinzhuangbao Township (辛庄堡乡), Jiehedian Township (界河店乡), Yaozhai Township (姚寨乡)

== Hengshui ==
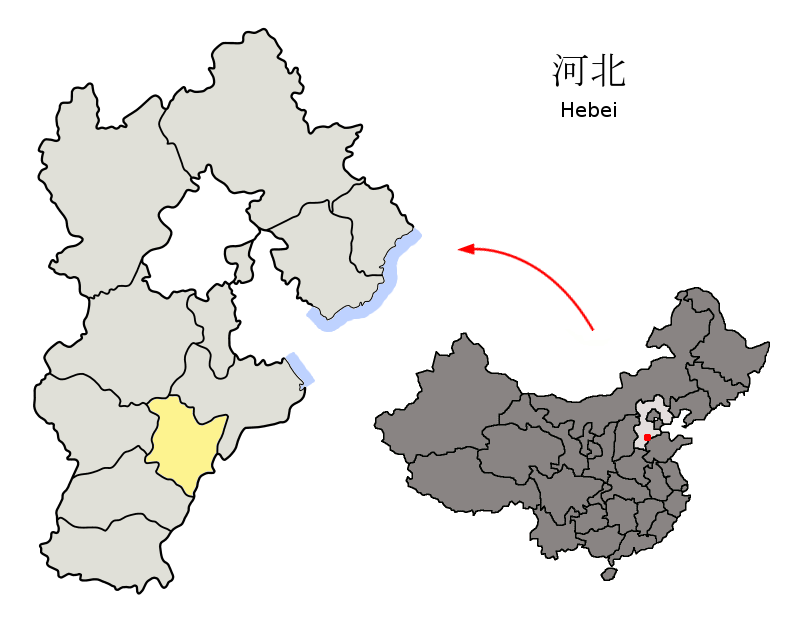
Location of Hengshui in the province

=== Taocheng District ===
Subdistricts:

- Hexi Subdistrict (河西街道), Hedong Subdistrict (河东街道), Lubei Subdistrict (路北街道), Zhonghua Subdistrict (中华街道)

Towns:

- Zhengjiaheyan (郑家河沿镇), Zhaoquan (赵圈镇)

Townships:

- Hejiazhuang Township (何家庄乡), Damasen Township (大麻森乡), Dengzhuang Township (邓庄乡), Pengducun Township (彭杜村乡)

=== Jizhou ===
Towns:

- Jizhou Town (冀州镇), Weijiatun (魏家屯镇), Guandaoli (官道李镇), Nanwucun (南午村镇), Zhoucun (周村镇), Matouli (码头李镇), Xiwangzhuang (西王庄镇)

Townships:

- Menjiazhuang Township (门家庄乡), Xujiazhuang Township (徐家庄乡), Beizhanghuai Township (北漳淮乡), Xiaozhai Township (小寨乡)

=== Shenzhou City ===
Towns:

- Tangfeng (唐奉镇), Shenzhou Town (深州镇), Chenshi (辰时镇), Yuke (榆科镇), Weiqiao (魏桥镇), Dadi (大堤镇), Qianmotou (前磨头镇), Wangjiajing (王家井镇), Hujiachi (护驾迟镇)

Townships:

- Bingcao Township (兵曹乡), Mucun Township (穆村乡), Dong'anzhuang Township (东安庄乡), Beixicun Township (北溪村乡), Dafengying Township (大冯营乡), Qiaotun Township (乔屯乡), Taiguzhuang Township (太古庄乡), Datun Township (大屯乡)

=== Anping County ===
Towns:

- Anping (安平镇), Madian (马店镇), Nanwangzhuang (南王庄镇)

Townships:

- Dahezhuang Township (大何庄乡), Chengyouzi Township (程油子乡), Xiliangwa Township (西两洼乡), Daziwen Township (大子文乡), Donghuangcheng Township (东黄城乡)

=== Fucheng County ===
Towns:

- Fucheng (阜城镇), Gucheng (古城镇), Matou (码头镇), Xiakou (霞口镇), Cuijiamiao (崔家庙镇)

Townships:

- Manhe Township (漫河乡), Jianqiao Township (建桥乡), Jiangfang Township (蒋坊乡), Dabai Township (大白乡), Wangji Township (王集乡)

=== Gucheng County ===
Towns:

- Zhengjiakou (郑家口镇), Xiazhuang (夏庄镇), Qinghan (青罕镇), Gucheng (故城镇), Wuguanzhai (武官寨镇), Raoyangdian (饶阳店镇), Juntun (军屯镇), Jianguo (建国镇), Xibantun (西半屯镇)

Townships:

- Xinzhuang Township (辛庄乡), Lilao Township (里老乡), Fangzhuang Township (房庄乡), Sanlang Township (三朗乡)

=== Jing County ===
Towns:

- Jingzhou (景州镇), Longhua (龙华镇), Guangchuan (广川镇), Jing County (王瞳镇), Jiangheliu (洚河流镇), Anling (安陵镇), Duqiao (杜桥镇), Wangqiansi (王谦寺镇), Beiliuzhi (北留智镇), Liuzhimiao (留智庙镇)

Townships:

- Liuji Township (刘集乡), Lianzhen Township (连镇乡), Liangji Township (梁集乡), Wencheng Township (温城乡), Houliumingfu Township (后留名府乡), Qinglan Township (青兰乡)

=== Raoyang County ===
Towns:

- Raoyang (饶阳镇), Dayincun (大尹村镇), Wusong (五公镇), Daguanting (大官亭镇)

Townships:

- Wangtongyue Township (王同岳乡), Liuchu Township (留楚乡), Dongliman Township (东里满乡)

=== Wuqiang County ===
Towns:

- Wuqiang (武强镇), Jieguan (街关镇), Zhouwo (周窝镇)

Townships:

- Doucun Township (豆村乡), Beidai Township (北代乡), Sunzhuang Township (孙庄乡)

=== Wuyi County ===
Towns:

- Wuyi (武邑镇), Qingliangdian (清凉店镇), Shenpo (审坡镇), Zhaoqiao (赵桥镇), Hanzhuang (韩庄镇), Xiaoqiaotou (肖桥头镇)

Townships:

- Longdian Township (龙店乡), Quantou Township (圈头乡), Dazita Township (大紫塔乡)

=== Zaoqiang County ===
Towns:

- Zaoqiang (枣强镇), Encha (恩察镇), Daying (大营镇), Jiahui (嘉会镇), Matun (马屯镇), Xiaozhang (肖张镇)

Townships:

- Zhangxiutun Township (张秀屯乡), Xintun Township (新屯乡), Wangjun Township (王均乡), Tanglin Township (唐林乡), Wangchang Township (王常乡)

== Langfang ==
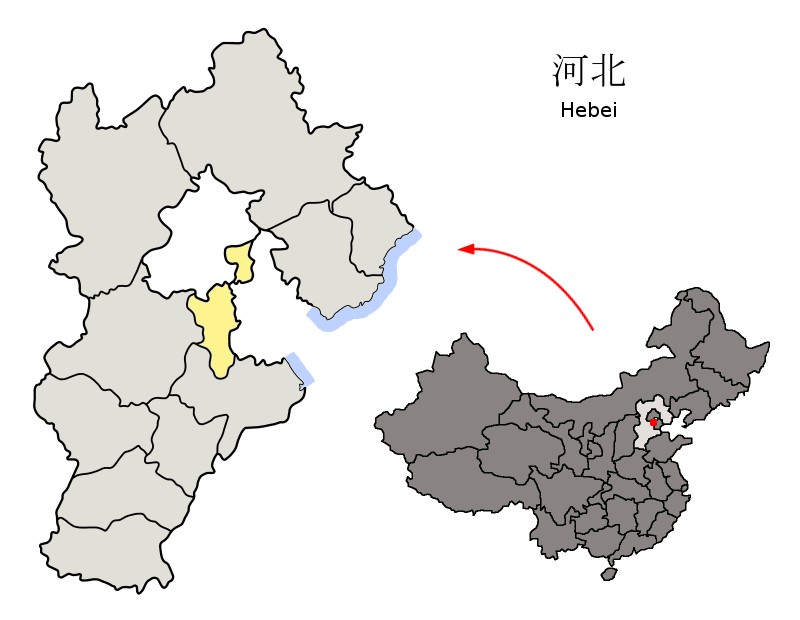
Location of Langfang in the province

=== Anci District ===
Subdistricts:

- South Yinhe Road Subdistrict (银河南路街道), West Guangming Street Subdistrict (光明西道街道), Yonghua Street Subdistrict (永华道街道)

Towns:

- Luofa (落垡镇), Matou (码头镇), Geyucheng (葛渔城镇), Donggugang (东沽港镇)

Townships:

- Yangshuiwu Township (杨税务乡), Qiuzhuang Township (仇庄乡), Diaohetou Township (调河头乡), Beishijiawu Township (北史家务乡)

=== Guangyang District ===
Subdistricts;

- North Yinhe Road Subdistrict (银河北路街道), East Aimin Street Subdistrict (爱民东道街道), Jiefang Street Subdistrict (解放道街道), Xinkai Road Subdistrict (新开路街道), Xinyuan Street Subdistrict (新源道街道)

Towns:

- Nanjianta (南尖塔镇), Wanzhuang (万庄镇), Jiuzhou (九州镇)

The only township is Beiwang Township (北旺乡)

=== Bazhou ===
Towns:

- Bazhou (霸州镇), Nanmeng (南孟镇), Xin'an (信安镇), Tang'erli (堂二里镇), Jianchapu (煎茶铺镇), Shengfang (胜芳镇), Yangfengang (杨芬港镇)

Townships:

- Chaheji Township (岔河集乡), Kangxianzhuang Township (康仙庄乡), Dongyangzhuang Township (东杨庄乡), Wangzhuangzi Township (王庄子乡), Dongduan Township (东段乡)

=== Sanhe ===
Towns:

- Juyang (泃阳镇), Liqizhuang (李旗庄镇), Yangzhuang (杨庄镇), Huangzhuang (皇庄镇), Xinji (新集镇), Duanjialing (段甲岭镇), Huangshizhuang (黄土庄镇), Gaolou (高楼镇), Qixinzhuang (齐心庄镇), Yanjiao (燕郊镇)

=== Dachang Hui Autonomous County ===
Towns:

- Dachang (大厂镇), Xiadian (夏垫镇), Qigezhuang (祁各庄镇)

Townships:

- Shaofu Township (邵府乡), Chenfu Township (陈府乡)

=== Dacheng County ===
Towns:

- Pingshu (平舒镇), Wangcun (旺村镇), Dashangtun (大尚屯镇), Nanzhaofu (南赵扶镇), Liugezhuang (留各庄镇), Quancun (权村镇), Litan (里坦镇)

Townships:

- Beiwei Township (北位乡), Daguang'an Township (大广安乡), Zangtun Township (臧屯乡)

=== Gu'an County ===
Towns:

- Gu'an (固安镇), Gongcun (宫村镇), Liuquan (柳泉镇), Niutuo (牛驼镇), Mazhuang (马庄镇)

Townships:

- Dongwan Township (东湾乡), Pengcun Township (彭村乡), Qugou Township (渠沟乡), Lirangdian Township (礼让店乡)

=== Wen'an County ===
Towns:

- Wen'an (文安镇), Xinzhen (新镇镇), Suqiao (苏桥镇), Daliuhe (大柳河镇), Zuogezhuang (左各庄镇), Tanli (滩里镇), Shigezhuang (史各庄镇), Zhaogezhuang (赵各庄镇), Xinglonggong (兴隆宫镇), Daliuzhen (大留镇镇), Sunshi (孙氏镇), Degui (德归镇)

The only township is Daweihe Hui and Manchu Ethnic Township (大围河回族满族乡)

=== Xianghe County ===
Towns:

- Shuyang (淑阳镇), Jiangxintun (蒋辛屯镇), Qukou (渠口镇), Antoutun (安头屯镇), Anping (安平镇), Liusong (刘宋镇), Wubaihu (五百户镇)

Townships:

- Qianwang Township (钱旺乡), Qiantun Township (钳屯乡)

=== Yongqing County ===
The only subdistrict Yongqingxian Subdistrict (永清县街道)

Towns:

- Yongqing (永清镇), Hancun (韩村镇), Houyi (后奕镇), Bieguzhuang (别古庄镇), Lilancheng (里澜城镇)

Townships:

- Caojiawu Township (曹家务乡), Longhuzhuang Township (龙虎庄乡), Liujie Township (刘街乡), Sanshengkou Township (三圣口乡), Guanjiawu Hui Ethnic Township (管家务回族乡)

== Qinhuangdao ==
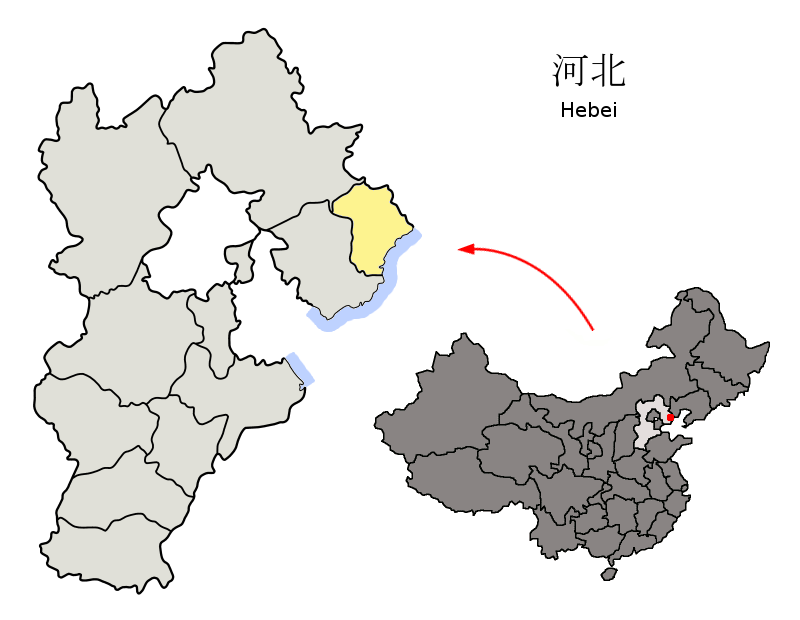
Location of Qinhuangdao in the province

=== Beidaihe District ===
Subdistricts:

- Xishan Subdistrict (西山街道), Dongshan Subdistrict (东山街道)

Towns:

- Haibin (海滨镇), Daihe (戴河镇)

=== Haigang District ===
Subdistricts:

- Wenhua Road Subdistrict (文化路街道), Haibin Road Subdistrict (海滨路街道), Beihuan Road Subdistrict (北环路街道), Jianshe Avenue Subdistrict (建设大街街道), Hedong Subdistrict (河东街道), Xigang Road Subdistrict (西港路街道), Yanshan Avenue Subdistrict (燕山大街街道), Gangcheng Avenue Subdistrict (港城大街街道), Donghuan Road Subdistrict (东环路街道), Baitaling Subdistrict (白塔岭街道), Qinhuangdao Economic and Technological Development Zone Zhujiang Street Subdistrict (秦皇岛经济技术开发区珠江道街道), Huanghe Street Subdistrict (黄河道街道), Tengfei Road Subdistrict (腾飞路街道)

Towns:

- Donggang (东港镇), Haigang Town (海港镇), Xigang (西港镇), Haiyang (海阳镇), Beigang (北港镇)

=== Shanhaiguan District ===
Subdistricts:

- Nanguan Subdistrict (南关街道), Dongjie Subdistrict (东街街道), Xijie Subdistrict (西街街道), Lunan Subdistrict (路南街道), Chuanchang Road Subdistrict (船厂路街道)

Towns:

- Diyiguan (第一关镇), Shihe (石河镇), Mengjiang (孟姜镇)

Townships:

- Bohai Township (渤海乡)

=== Changli County ===
Towns:

- Changli (昌黎镇), Jing'an (靖安镇), Anshan (安山镇), Longjiadian (龙家店镇), Nijing (泥井镇), Dapuhe (大蒲河镇), Xinji (新集镇), Liutaizhuang (刘台庄镇), Ruhe (茹荷镇), Zhugezhuang (朱各庄镇), Huangtianzhuang (荒佃庄镇)

Townships:

- Tuanlin Township (团林乡), Getiaogang Township (葛条港乡), Matuodian Township (马坨店乡), Liangshan Township (两山乡), Shilipu Township (十里铺乡)

=== Funing County ===
Subdistricts:

- Licheng Subdistrict (骊城街道), Nandaihe Subdistrict (南戴河街道)

Towns:

- Funing (抚宁镇), Liushouying (留守营镇), Yuguan (榆关镇), Niutouya (牛头崖镇), Shimenzhai (石门寨镇), Taiying (台营镇), Daxinzhai (大新寨镇), Zhucaoying (驻操营镇), Duzhuang (杜庄镇)

Townships:

- Chapeng Township (茶棚乡), Shenhe Township (深河乡)

=== Lulong County ===
Towns:

- Lulong (卢龙镇), Panzhuang (潘庄镇), Yanheying (燕河营镇), Shuangwang (双望镇), Liutiangezhuang (刘田各庄镇), Shimen (石门镇)

Townships:

- Xiazhai Township (下寨乡), Liujiaying Township (刘家营乡), Chenguantun Township (陈官屯乡), Yinzhuang Township (印庄乡), Gebo Township (蛤泊乡), Mujing Township (木井乡)

=== Qinglong Manchu Autonomous County ===
Towns:

- Qinglong (青龙镇), Zushan (祖山镇), Mutoudeng (木头凳镇), Shuangshanzi (双山子镇), Maquanzi (马圈子镇), Xiaoyingzi (肖营子镇), Dawulan (大巫岚镇), Tumenzi (土门子镇), Badaohe (八道河镇), Gehetou (隔河头镇), Louzhangzi (娄仗子镇)

Townships:

- Fenghuangshan Township (凤凰山乡), Longwangmiao Township (龙王庙乡), Sanxingkou Township (三星口乡), Gangou Township (干沟乡), Dashiling Township (大石岭乡), Guanchang Township (官场乡), Ciyushan Township (茨榆山乡), Pingfangzi Township (平方子乡), Anziling Township (安子岭乡), Zhuzhangzi Township (朱仗子乡), Caonian Township (草碾乡), Qidaohe Township (七道河乡), Sanbozi Township (三拨子乡), Liangshuihe Township (凉水河乡)

== Tangshan ==
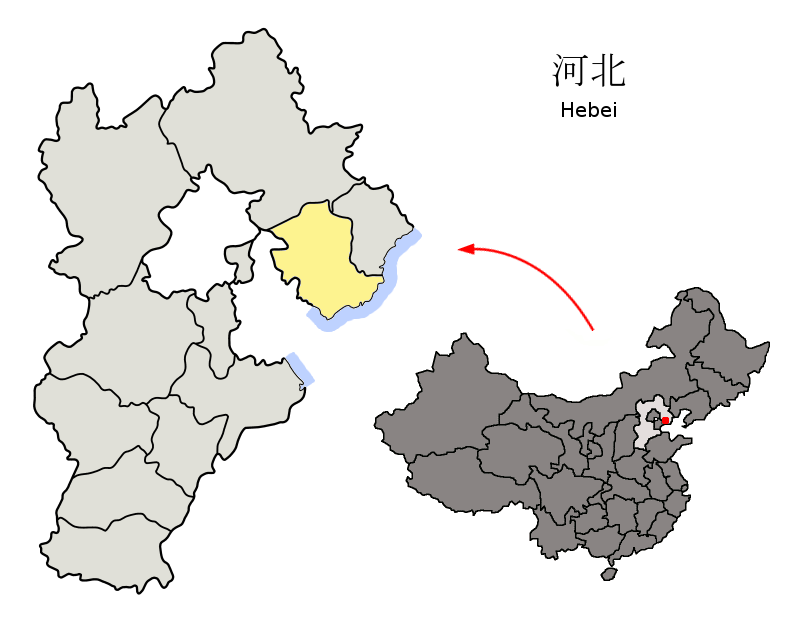
Location of Tangshan in the province

=== Caofeidian District ===
Towns:

- Tanghai (唐海镇), Binhai (滨海镇), Liuzan (柳赞镇)

=== Fengnan District ===
Subdistricts:

- Xugezhuang Subdistrict (胥各庄镇)

Towns:

- Fengnan Town (丰南镇), Daodi (稻地镇), Qianying (钱营镇), Tangfang (唐坊镇), Huanggezhuang (黄各庄镇), Xige (西葛镇), Xiaoji (小集镇), Wanglanzhuang (王兰庄镇), Daxinzhuang (大新庄镇), Liushuquan (柳树瞿阝镇), Heiyanzi (黑沿子镇), Daqigezhuang (大齐各庄镇)

Townships:

- Nansunzhuang Township (南孙庄乡), Dongtianzhuang Township (东田庄乡), Jianzigu Township (尖字沽乡)

There is the Tangshan Nanbao Development Zone (唐山市南堡开发区)

=== Fengrun District ===
Subdistricts:

- Taiping Road Subdistrict (太平路街道), Yanshan Road Subdistrict (燕山路街道), Gengyang Subdistrict (浭阳街道)

Towns:

- Fengrun Town (丰润镇), Laozhuangzi (老庄子镇), Rengezhuang (任各庄镇), Zuojiawu (左家坞镇), Quanhetou (泉河头镇), Wangguanying (官营镇), Huoshiying (火石营镇), Hancheng (韩城镇), Chahe (岔河镇), Xinjuntun (新军屯镇), Xiaozhanggezhuang (小张各庄镇), Fengdengwu (丰登坞镇), Lizhaozhuang (李钊庄镇), Baiguantun (白官屯镇), Shigezhuang (石各庄镇), Shaliuhe (沙流河镇), Qishuzhuang (七树庄镇), Yangguanlin (杨官林镇)

Townships:

- Jiangjiaying Township (姜家营乡), Huanxizhuang Township (欢喜庄乡), Yinchengpu Township (银城铺乡), Liujiaying Township (刘家营乡), Changzhuang Township (常庄乡)

=== Guye District ===
Subdistricts:

- Tangjiazhuang Subdistrict (唐家庄街道), Zhaogezhuang Subdistrict (赵各庄街道), Linxi Subdistrict (林西街道), Guye Subdistrict (古冶街道), Nanfangezhuang Subdistrict (南范各庄街道), Lüjiatuo Subdistrict (吕家坨街道)

Townships:

- Wangnianzhuang Township (王辇庄乡), Beijiadian Township (卑家店乡), Fangezhuang Township (范各庄乡), Dazhuangtuo Township (大庄坨乡), Xijiatao Township (习家套乡)

=== Kaiping District ===
Subdistricts:

- Kaiping Subdistrict (开平街道), Doudian Subdistrict (陡电街道), Jinggezhuang Mining District Subdistrict (荆各庄矿区街道), Majiagou Subdistrict (马家沟街道), Shuiwuzhuang Subdistrict (税务庄街道)

Towns:

- Kaiping Town (开平镇), Liyuan (栗园镇), Zhengzhuangzi (郑庄子镇), Shuangqiao (双桥镇), Wali (洼里镇), Yuehe (越河镇)

=== Lubei District ===
Subdistricts:

- Qiaotun Subdistrict (乔屯街道), Wenhua Road Subdistrict (文化路街道), Diaoyutai Subdistrict (钓鱼台街道), Dongxincun Subdistrict (东新村街道), Gangyao Subdistrict (缸窑街道), Jichang Road Subdistrict (机场路街道), Hebei Road Subdistrict (河北路街道), Longdong Subdistrict (龙东街道), Dali Subdistrict (大里街道), Guangming Subdistrict (光明街道), Xiangyun Subdistrict (翔云道街道)

The only township is Guoyuan Township (果园乡)

Tangshan New Technology Development Zone (唐山市高新技术开发区)

=== Lunan District ===
Subdistricts:

- Youyili Subdistrict (友谊里街道), South Xueyuan Road Subdistrict (学院南路街道), Guangchang Subdistrict (广场街道), Yonghongqiao Subdistrict (永红桥街道), Xiaoshan Subdistrict (小山街道), Wenhuabeihou Avenue Subdistrict (文化北后街街道), Qianjiaying Mining District Subdistrict (钱家营矿区街道)

The only township is Nüzhizhai Township (女织寨乡)

=== Qian'an ===
Towns:

- Qian'an (迁安镇), Xiaguanying (夏官营镇), Yanggezhuang (杨各庄镇), Jianchangying (建昌营镇), Zhaodianzi (赵店子镇), Yajituo (野鸡坨镇), Dacuizhuang (大崔庄镇), Yangdianzi (杨店子镇), Caiyuan (蔡园镇), Malanzhuang (马兰庄镇), Shaheyi (沙河驿镇), Muchangkou (木厂口镇)

Townships:

- Kouzhuang Township (扣庄乡), Pengdianzi Township (彭店子乡), Shangsheyanzhuang Township (上射雁庄乡), Yanjiadian Township (闫家店乡), Wuchong'an Township (五重安乡), Dawuli Township (大五里乡), Taipingzhuang Township (太平庄乡)

=== Zunhua ===
Towns:

- Zunhua Town (遵化镇), Baozidian (堡子店镇), Malanyu, Ping'ancheng (平安城镇), Dongxinzhuang (东新庄镇), Xindianzi (新店子镇), Dangyu (党峪镇), Dibeitou (地北头镇), Dongjiuzhai (东旧寨镇), Tiechang (铁厂镇), Sujiawa (苏家洼镇), Jianming (建明镇), Shimen (石门镇)

Townships:

- Xiliucun Township (西留村乡), Cuijiazhuang Township (崔家庄乡), Xingwangzhai Township (兴旺寨乡), Liubeizhai Township (刘备寨乡), Tuanpiaozhuang Township (团瓢庄乡), Niangniangzhuang Township (娘娘庄乡), Xisanli Township (西三里乡), Houjiazhai Township (候家寨乡), Xiaochang Township (小厂乡), Xiaxiaying Manchu Ethnic Township (西下营满族乡), Tangquan Manchu Ethnic Township (汤泉满族乡), Dongling Manchu Ethnic Township (东陵满族乡)

=== Laoting County ===
Subdistricts:

- Chengqu Subdistrict (城区街道)

Towns:

- Laoting (乐亭镇), Tangjiahe (汤家河镇), Hujiatuo (胡家坨镇), Wangtan (王滩镇), Yangezhuang (闫各庄镇), Matouying (马头营镇), Xinzhai (新寨镇), Tingliuhe (汀流河镇), Jianggezhuang (姜各庄镇), Maozhuang (毛庄镇), Zhongbao (中堡镇)

Townships:

- Panggezhuang Township (庞各庄乡), Daxianggezhuang Township (大相各庄乡), Guhe Township (古河乡)

=== Luan County ===
Towns:

- Luanzhou (滦州镇), Xiangtang (响堂镇), Dong'angezhuang (东安各庄镇), Leizhuang (雷庄镇), Ciyutuo (茨榆坨镇), Bangzi (榛子镇), Yangliuzhuang (杨柳庄镇), Youzha (油榨镇), Guma (古马镇), Xiaomazhuang (小马庄镇), Jiubaihu (九百户镇), Wangdianzi (王店子镇)

=== Luannan County ===
Towns:

- Bencheng (倴城镇), Songdaokou (宋道口镇), Changning (长凝镇), Hugezhuang (胡各庄镇), Tuoli (坨里镇), Yaowangzhuang (姚王庄镇), Sigezhuang (司各庄镇), Angezhuang (安各庄镇), Bachigang (扒齿港镇), Chengzhuang (程庄镇), Qingtuoying (青坨营镇), Baigezhuang (柏各庄镇), Nanbao (南堡镇), Fanggezhuang (方各庄镇), Donghuangtuo (东黄坨镇), Macheng (马城镇)

=== Qianxi County ===
The only subdistrict is Lixiang Subdistrict (栗乡街道)

Towns:

- Xingcheng (兴城镇), Jinchangyu (金厂峪镇), Saheqiao (洒河桥镇), Taipingzhai (太平寨镇), Luojiatun (罗家屯镇), Dongmangyu (东荒峪镇), Xinji (新集镇), Santunying (三屯营镇), Luanyang (滦阳镇)

Townships:

- Baimiaozi Township (白庙子乡), Shangying Township (上营乡), Han'erzhuang Township (汉儿庄乡), Yuhuzhai Township (渔户寨乡), Jiucheng Township (旧城乡), Yinzhuang Township (尹庄乡), Donglianhuayuan Township (东莲花院乡), Xinzhuangzi Township (新庄子乡)

=== Yutian County ===
Towns:

- Yutian (玉田镇), Liangjiadian (亮甲店镇), Yahongqiao (鸦鸿桥镇), Woluogu (窝洛沽镇), Shijiuwo (石臼窝镇), Hongqiao (虹桥镇), Sanshuitou (散水头镇), Linnancang (林南仓镇), Linxi (林西镇), Yangjiabanqiao (杨家板桥镇), Caitingqiao (彩亭桥镇), Gushu (孤树镇), Da'an (大安镇), Tangzitou (唐自头镇)

Townships:

- Guojiatun Township (郭家屯乡), Lintoutun Township (林头屯乡), Yangjiatao Township (杨家套乡), Chaoluowo Township (潮洛窝乡), Chenjiapu Township (陈家铺乡), Guojiaqiao Township (郭家桥乡)

== Xingtai ==
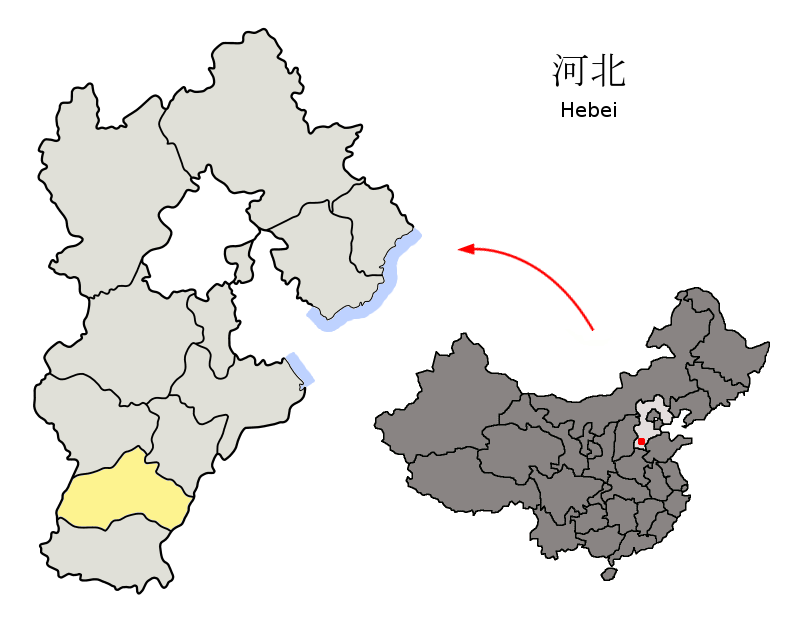
Location of Xingtai in the province

=== Qiaodong District, Xingtai ===
Subdistricts:

- Nanchang Avenue Subdistrict (南长街街道), Beida Avenue Subdistrict (北大街街道), Xida Avenue Subdistrict (西大街街道), Ximenli Subdistrict (西门里街道)

The only town is Dongguocun (东郭村镇), and the only township is Daliangzhuang Township (大梁庄乡).

=== Qiaoxi District, Xingtai ===
Subdistricts:

- Gangtie Road Subdistrict (钢铁路街道), Zhongxing Road Subdistrict (中兴路街道), Dahuoquan Subdistrict (达活泉街道), Zhangkuan Subdistrict (张宽街道), Zhangcun Subdistrict (章村街道), Zhonghua Avenue Subdistrict (中华大街街道), Tuanjie Road Subdistrict (团结路街道), Quanxi Subdistrict (泉西街道)

Towns:

- Nandaguo (南大郭镇), Licun Township (李村镇)

=== Nangong ===
Subdistricts:

- Fenggang Subdistrict (凤岗街道), Nandu Subdistrict (南杜街道), Beihu Subdistrict (北胡街道), Xiding Subdistrict (西丁街道)

Towns:

- Sucun (苏村镇), Dagaocun (大高村镇), Chuiyang (垂杨镇), Minghua (明化镇), Duanlutou (段芦头镇), Qianzizhong (前紫冢镇)

Townships:

- Dacun Township (大村乡), Nanbiancun Township (南便村乡), Datun Township (大屯乡), Wangdaozhai Township (王道寨乡), Xuewucun Township (薛吴村乡)

=== Shahe ===
Subdistricts:

- Dalian Subdistrict (褡裢街道), Qiaodong Subdistrict (桥东街道), Qiaoxi Subdistrict (桥西街道), Zanshan Subdistrict (赞善街道), Zhouzhuang Subdistrict (周庄街道)

Towns:

- Shahecheng (沙河城镇), Xincheng (新城镇), Baita (白塔镇), Shiliting (十里亭镇), Qicun (綦村镇)

Townships:

- Liucun Township (留村乡), Cejing Township (册井乡), Liushigang Township (刘石岗乡), Chaiguan Township (柴关乡), Chanfang Township (蝉房乡)

=== Baixiang County ===
Towns:

- Baixiang (柏乡镇), Guchengdian (固城店镇), Xiwang (西汪镇)

Townships:

- Wangjiazhuang Township (王家庄乡), Neibu Township (内步乡), Longhua Township (龙华乡)

=== Guangzong County ===
The only town is Guangzong (广宗镇)

Townships:

- Dapingtai Township (大平台乡), Dongzhao Township (东召乡), Jianzhi Township (件只乡), Hetaoyuan Township (核桃园乡), Hulu Township (葫芦乡), Beitangtuan Township (北塘疃乡), Fengjiazhai Township (冯家寨乡)

=== Julu County ===
Towns:

- Julu (巨鹿镇), Wanghuzhai (王虎寨镇), Xiguocheng (西郭城镇), Guanting (官亭镇), Yantuan (阎疃镇), Xiaolüzhai (小吕寨镇)

Townships:

- Ticun Township (堤村乡), Zhangwangtuan Township (张王疃乡), Guanzhai Township (观寨乡), Sujiaying Township (苏家营乡)

=== Lincheng County ===
Towns:

- Lincheng (临城镇), Dongzhen (东镇镇), Xishu (西竖镇), Haozhuang (郝庄镇)

Townships:

- Heicheng Township (黑城乡), Yageying Township (鸭鸽营乡), Shicheng Township (石城乡), Zhaozhuang Township (赵庄乡)

=== Linxi County ===
Towns:

- Linxi (临西镇), Hexi (河西镇), Xiabaosi (下堡寺镇), Jianzhong (尖冢镇), Laoguanzhai (老官寨镇)

Townships:

- Lüzhai Township (吕寨乡), Yao'anzhen Township (摇安镇乡), Daliuzhuang Township (大刘庄乡), Dongzaoyuan Township (东枣元乡)

=== Longyao County ===
Towns:

- Longyao (隆尧镇), Weijiazhuang (魏家庄镇), Yincun (尹村镇), Shankou (山口镇), Lianzi (莲子镇), Gucheng (固城镇)

Townships:

- Beilou Township (北楼乡), Dongliang Township (东良乡), Shuangbei Township (双碑乡), Niujiaqiao Township (牛家桥乡), Qianhuying Township (千户营乡), Dazhangzhuang Township (大张庄乡)

=== Nanhe County ===
Towns:

- Heyang (和阳镇), Jiasong (贾宋镇), Haoqiao (郝桥镇)

Townships:

- Dongsanzhao Township (东三召乡), Yanli Township (阎里乡), Heguo Township (河郭乡), Shizhao Township (史召乡), Sansi Township (三思乡)

=== Neiqiu County ===
Towns:

- Neiqiu (内丘镇), Damengcun (大孟村镇), Jindian (金店镇), Guanzhuang (官庄镇), Liulin (柳林镇)

Townships:

- Wuguodian Township (五郭店乡), Nanzhai Township (南赛乡), Zhangmao Township (獐獏乡), Houjiazhuang Township (侯家庄乡)

=== Ningjin County ===
Towns:

- Fenghuang (凤凰镇), Hequ (河渠镇), Beihezhuang (北河庄镇), Gengzhuangqiao (耿庄桥镇), Dongwang (东汪镇), Jiajiakou (贾家口镇), Sizhilan (四芝兰镇), Dalucun (大陆村镇), Sujiazhuang (苏家庄镇), Huanmadian (换马店镇)

Townships:

- Houkou Township (侯口乡), Jichangzhuang Township (纪昌庄乡), Tangqiu Township (唐邱乡), Beiyu Township (北鱼乡), Xujiahe Township (徐家河乡), Dacaozhuang Township (大曹庄乡)

=== Pingxiang County ===
Towns:

- Fengzhou (丰州镇), Hegumiao (河古庙镇), Pingxiang (平乡镇)

Townships:

- Youzhao Township (油召乡), Jiegu Township (节固乡), Tianfucun Township (田付村乡), Xunzhao Township (寻召乡)

=== Qinghe County ===
Towns:

- Gexianzhuang (葛仙庄镇), Lianzhuang (连庄镇), Youfang (油坊镇), Xielu (谢炉镇), Wangguanzhuang (王官庄镇), Baying (坝营镇)

=== Ren County ===
Towns:

- Rencheng (任城镇), Xingjiawan (邢家湾镇), Xindian (辛店镇)

Townships:

- Luozhuang Township (骆庄乡), Tiankou Township (天口乡), Datun Township (大屯乡), Yongfuzhuang Township (永福庄乡), Xigucheng Township (固城乡)

=== Wei County, Xingtai ===
Towns:

- Mingzhou (洺州镇), Liyuantun (梨元屯镇), Zhangtai (章台镇), Houguan (侯贯镇), Qiji (七级镇)

Townships:

- Fangjiaying Township (方家营乡), Dishiying Township (第什营乡), Zaoyuan Township (枣园乡), Guxian Township (固献乡), Hezhao Township (贺钊乡), Heying Township (贺营乡), Zhangying Township (张营乡), Changtun Township (常屯乡), Changzhuang Township (常庄乡), Gaogongzhuang Township (高公庄乡), Zhaocun Township (赵村乡)

=== Xingtai County ===
Subdistricts:

- Yurangqiao Subdistrict (豫让桥街道)

Towns:

- Dongwang (东汪镇), Wangkuai (王快镇), Zhucun (祝村镇), Yanjiatun (晏家屯镇), Nanshimen (南石门镇), Yangfan (羊范镇), Huangsi (皇寺镇), Huining (会宁镇), Xihuangcun (西黄村镇), Luluo (路罗镇), Jiangjunmu (将军墓镇), Jiangshui (浆水镇), Songjiazhuang (宋家庄镇)

Townships:

- Taizijing Township (太子井乡), Longquansi Township (龙泉寺乡), Beixiaozhuang Township (北小庄乡), Chengjitou Township (城计头乡), Bai'an Township (白岸乡), Jijiacun Township (冀家村乡)

=== Xinhe County ===
Towns:

- Xinhe (新河镇), Xunzhai (寻寨镇)

Townships:

- Baishenshou Township (白神首乡), Jingjiazhuang Township (荆家庄乡), Xiliu Township (西流乡), Renrangli Township (仁让里乡)

== Zhangjiakou ==
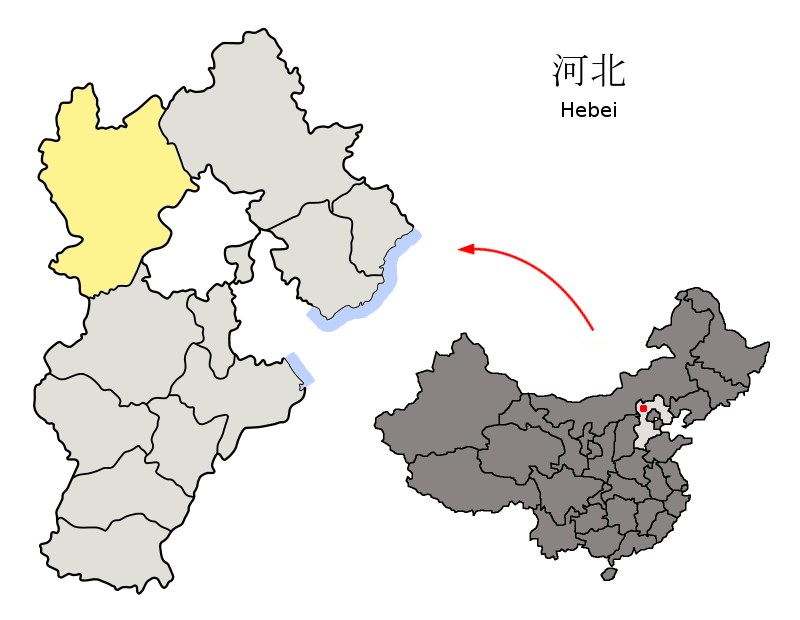
Location of Zhangjiakou in the province

=== Qiaodong District, Zhangjiakou ===
Subdistricts:

- Hongqilou Subdistrict (红旗楼街道), North Shengli Road Subdistrict (胜利北路街道), Wuyi Avenue Subdistrict (五一大街街道), Huayuan Avenue Subdistrict (花园街街道), Zuanshi Road Subdistrict (钻石路街道), Nanzhan Subdistrict (南站街道), Maludong Subdistrict (马路东街道)

Towns:

- Laoyazhuang (老鸦庄镇), Yaojiazhuang (姚家庄镇)

=== Qiaoxi District, Zhangjiakou ===
Subdistricts:

- South Mingde Avenue Subdistrict (明德南街街道), Dahuanmen Subdistrict (大境门街道), North Mingde Avenue Subdistrict (明德北街街道), Xinhua Avenue Subdistrict (新华街街道), Baozili Subdistrict (堡子里街道), Nanyingfang Subdistrict (南营坊街道), Gongren New Village Subdistrict (工人新村街道)

Towns:

- Dongyaozi (东窑子镇), Shenjiatun (沈家屯镇)

=== Xiahuayuan District ===
Subdistricts:

- Chengzhen Subdistrict (城镇街道), Meikuang Subdistrict (煤矿街道)

Townships:

- Huayuan Township (花园乡), Xinzhuangzi Township (辛庄子乡), Dingfangshui Township (定方水乡), Duanjiabao Township (段家堡乡)

=== Xuanhua District ===
Subdistricts:

- Tianqinsi Subdistrict (天泰寺街道), Huangcheng Subdistrict (皇城街道), Nanguan Subdistrict (南关街道), Nanda Avenue Subdistrict, Zhangjiakou (南大街街道), Dabei Avenue Subdistrict (大北街街道), Gongye Avenue Subdistrict (工业街街道), Jianguo Avenue Subdistrict (建国街街道)

The only town is Pangjiabao (庞家堡镇)

Townships:

- Hezixi Township (河子西乡), Chunguang Township (春光乡), Houjiamiao Township (侯家庙乡)

=== Chicheng County ===
Towns:

- Chicheng (赤城镇), Tianjiayao (田家窑镇), Longguan (龙关镇), Diao'e (雕鹗镇), Dushikou (独石口镇), Baicao (白草镇), Longmensuo (龙门所镇), Houcheng (后城镇), Dongmao (东卯镇)

Townships:

- Paoliang Township (炮梁乡), Dahaituo Township (大海陀乡), Zhenningbao Township (镇宁堡乡), Maying Township (马营乡), Yunzhou Township (云州乡), Sandaochuan Township (三道川乡), Dongwankou Township (东万口乡), Ciyingzi Township (茨营子乡), Yangtian Township (样田乡)

=== Chongli County ===
Towns:

- Xiwanzi (西湾子镇), Gaojiaying (高家营镇)

Townships:

- Sitaizui Township (四台嘴乡), Hongzuying Township (红旗营乡), Shiyaozi Township (石窑子乡), Yimatu Township (驿马图乡), Shizuizi Township (石嘴子乡), Shizigou Township (狮子沟乡), Qingsanying Township (清三营乡), Baiqi Township (白旗乡)

=== Guyuan County ===
Towns:

- Pingdingbao (平定堡镇), Xiaochang (小厂镇), Huangshandiao (黄盖淖镇), Jiuliancheng (九连城镇)

Townships:

- Gaoshanbao Township (高山堡乡), Xiaohezi Township (小河子乡), Erdaoqu Township (二道渠乡), Da'erhao Hui Ethnic Township (大二号回族乡), Shandianhe Township (闪电河乡), Changliang Township (长梁乡), Fengyuandian Township (丰源店乡), Xixinying Township (西辛营乡), Lianhuatan Township (莲花滩乡), Baituyao Township (白土窑乡)

=== Huai'an County ===
Towns:

- Chaigoubu (柴沟堡镇), Zuowei (左卫镇), Toubaihu (头百户镇), Huai'ancheng (怀安城镇)

Townships:

- Dukoubao Township (渡口堡乡), Diliutun Township (第六屯乡), Xiwanbao Township (西湾堡乡), Sishacheng Township (西沙城乡), Taipingzhuang Township (太平庄乡), Wanghutun Township (王虎屯乡), Disanbao Township (第三堡乡)

=== Huailai County ===
Towns:

- Shacheng (沙城镇), Beixinbao (北辛堡镇), Xinbao'an (新保安镇), Donghuayuan (东花园镇), Guanting (官厅镇), Sangyuan (桑园镇), Cunrui (存瑞镇), Tumu (土木镇), Dahuangzhuang (大黄庄镇), Xibali (西八里镇), Xiaonanxinbao (小南辛堡镇)

Townships:

- Langshan Township (狼山乡), Jijiyi Township (鸡鸣驿乡), Dongbali Township (东八里乡), Ruiyunguan Township (瑞云观乡), Sunzhuangzi Township (孙庄子乡), Wangjialou Hui Ethnic Township (王家楼回族乡)

=== Kangbao County ===
Towns:

- Kangbao (康保镇), Zhangji (张纪镇), Tuchengzi (土城子镇), Dengyoufang (邓油坊镇), Lijiadi (李家地镇), Zhaoyanghe (照阳河镇), Tunken (屯垦镇)

Townships:

- Geyoufang Township (阎油房乡), Danqinghe Township (丹清河乡), Habiga Township (哈必嘎乡), Erhaobu Township (二号卜乡), Lujiaying Township (芦家营乡), Zhongyi Township (忠义乡), Chuchangdi Township (处长地乡), Mandetang Township (满德堂乡)

=== Shangyi County ===
Towns:

- Nanhaoqian (南壕堑镇), Daqinggou (大青沟镇), Badaogou (八道沟镇), Hongtuliang (红土梁镇), Xiaosuangou (小蒜沟镇), Sangongdi (三工地镇)

Townships:

- Dayingpan Township (大营盘乡), Dasuji Township (大苏计乡), Shijing Township (石井乡), Kangleng Township (炕塄乡), Qijia Township (七甲乡), Taolizhuang Township (套里庄乡), Jiashihe Township (甲石河乡), Xiamaquan Township (下马圈乡)

=== Wanquan County ===
Towns:

- Kongjiazhuang (孔家庄镇), Wanquan (万全镇), Ximalin (洗马林镇), Guoleizhuang (郭磊庄镇)

Townships:

- Shanfangbao Township (膳房堡乡), Beixintun Township (北新屯乡), Xuanpingbao Township (宣平堡乡), Gaomiaobao Township (高庙堡乡), Jiubao Township (旧堡乡), Anjiabao Township (安家堡乡), Beishacheng Township (北沙城乡)

=== Xuanhua County ===
Towns:

- Yanghenan (洋河南镇), Shenjing (深井镇), Guocun (崞村镇), Shalingzi (沙岭子镇), Yaojiafang (姚家房镇), Dacangshan (大仓盖镇), Jiajiaying (贾家营镇), Gujiaying (顾家营镇), Zhaochuan (赵川镇)

Townships:

- Wangjiawan Township (王家湾乡), Ta'ercun Township (塔儿村乡), Jiangjiatun Township (江家屯乡), Dongwangshan Township (东望山乡), Lijiabao Township (李家堡乡)

=== Yangyuan County ===
Towns:

- Xicheng (西城镇), Dongcheng (东城镇), Huashaoying (化稍营镇), Chuaihuatuan (揣骨疃镇), Dongjingji (东井集镇)

Townships:

- Yaojiazhuang Township (要家庄乡), Dongfangchengbao Township (东坊城堡乡), Jing'ergou Township (井儿沟乡), Sanmafang Township (三马坊乡), Gaoqiang Township (高墙乡), Datianwa Township (大田洼乡), Xinbao Township (辛堡乡), Maquanbao Township (马圈堡乡), Futujiang Township (浮图讲乡)

=== Yu County ===
Towns:

- Yuzhou (蔚州镇), Daiwangcheng (代王城镇), Xiheying (西合营镇), Jijiazhuang (吉家庄镇), Baile (白乐镇), Nuanquan (暖泉镇), Nanliuzhuang (南留庄镇), Beishuiquan (北水泉镇), Taohua (桃花镇), Yangjuan (阳眷镇), Songjiazhuang (宋家庄镇)

Townships:

- Xiagongcun Township (下宫村乡), Nanyangzhuang Township (南杨庄乡), Baishu Township (柏树乡), Changning Township (常宁乡), Yongquanzhuang Township (涌泉庄乡), Yangzhuangke Township (杨庄窠乡), Nanlingzhuang Township (南岭庄乡), Chenjiawa Township (陈家洼乡), Huangmei Township (黄梅乡), Baicaocun Township (白草村乡), Caogoubao Township (草沟堡乡)

=== Zhangbei County ===
Towns:

- Zhangbei (张北镇), Gonghui (公会镇), Ertai (二台镇), Dahulun (大囫囵镇)

Townships:

- Tailugou Township (台路沟乡), Youlougou Township (油篓沟乡), Mantouying Township (馒头营乡), Erquanjing Township (二泉井乡), Danjinghe Township (单晶河乡), Dahe Township (大河乡), Hailiutu Township (海流图乡), Liangmianjing Township (两面井乡), Haojiaying Township (郝家营乡), Baimiaotan Township (白庙滩乡), Xiao'ertai Township (小二台乡), Zhanhai Township (战海乡), Sanhao Township (三号乡), Huangshiya Township (黄石崖乡)

=== Zhuolu County ===
The county-administered district is Nanshan District (南山区)

Towns:

- Zhuolu (涿鹿镇), Zhangjiabao (张家堡镇), Wujiagou (武家沟镇), Wubao (五堡镇), Baodai (保岱镇), Fanshan (矾山镇), Dabao (大堡镇), Hedong (河东镇), Dongxiaozhuang (东小庄镇), Dahenan (大河南镇), Huiyao (辉耀镇)

Townships:

- Luanzhuang Township (栾庄乡), Wenquantun Township (温泉屯乡), Heishansi Township (黑山寺乡), Wofosi Township (卧佛寺乡), Xiejiabao Township (谢家堡乡), Mangshikou Township (蟒石口乡)
