= Yangjiazhuang =

Yangjiazhuang may refer to the following locations in China:

- Yangjiazhuang, Laiyuan County (杨家庄镇), town in Hebei
- Yangjiazhuang, Fenyang (杨家庄镇), town in Shanxi
- Yangjiazhuang Township, Hebei (杨家庄乡), in Dingzhou
- Yangjiazhuang Township, Shanxi (杨家庄乡), in Jiaoqu, Yangquan
