= Liuzao =

Liuzao may refer to the following locations in China:

- Liuzao, Hebei (留早镇), town in Dingzhou
- Liuzao, Shanghai (六灶镇), town in Pudong
