= Monan =

Monan may refer to:

== People ==
- Monan (saint) (fl. 6th–7th century), Irish saint
- Gerard Monan, Irish hurler
- J. Donald Monan (1924–2017), American academic administrator

== Places ==
- Monan, Punjab, village in Jhelum District, Punjab, Pakistan
- Monan, Hebei (陌南镇), town in Xian County, Hebei, China
- Monan, Shanxi (陌南镇), town in Ruicheng County, Shanxi, China
- Monan Park, baseball stadium in Boston, Massachusetts, USA
- Monan Patera, a crater on Jupiter's moon Io
- St Monans, town in Fife, Scotland
- Monan, an oil field located in the Eastern Trough Area Project in the North Sea
