= Fuxing District =

Fuxing District (復興區) may refer to:

- Fuxing District, Handan, district of Handan, Hebei, China (People's Republic of China)
- Fuxing District, Taoyuan, district of Taoyuan, Taiwan (Republic of China)
