= Longhua Township, Gaoyang County =

Longhua Township 龙化乡
- Township
- Lónghuà Xiāng
- Location in Hebei Location in China
- Coordinates: 38°43′28.5″N 115°55′47.1″E
- Country: People's Republic of China
- Province: Hebei
- Prefecture-level city: Baoding
- County: Anxin County

Area
  - Total: 55.77 km^{2} (21.53 sq mi)

Population (2010)
  - Total: 27,294
  - Density: 489.4/km^{2} (1,268/sq mi)
- Time zone: UTC+8 (China Standard)
- Area code: 312

Longhua Township (Chinese: 龙化乡; pinyin: Lónghuà Xiāng) is a rural township located in Anxin County, administered by the prefecture-level city of Baoding in Hebei Province, People's Republic of China. As of the 2010 census, Longhua Township had a population of 27,294 residing within a total area of 55.77 square kilometers, resulting in a population density of approximately 489.4 inhabitants per square kilometer.

According to demographic data from the 2010 census, Longhua Township's population was composed of 13,763 males (49.6%) and 13,531 females (50.4%). The age distribution was as follows: 5,228 individuals (19.2%) were aged 0–14 years, 19,554 (71.6%) were between 15 and 64 years old, and 2,512 (9.2%) were aged 65 years and above.

== See also ==
- List of township-level divisions of Hebei
