= Pengjiazhai Township =

Coordinates: 36°36′38″N 114°26′26″E

Pengjiazhai Township 彭家寨
- Subdistrict

Chinese transcription(s)
- Interactive map of Pengjiazhai Township
- Country: China
- Province: Hebei
- Prefecture: Handan
- District: Fuxing District
- Time zone: UTC+8 (China Standard Time)

Pengjiazhai Township
- Chinese: 彭家寨
- Hanyu Pinyin: Péngjiāzhài
- Literal meaning: Peng family village
Transcriptions
Standard Mandarin
- Hanyu Pinyin: Péngjiāzhài

Pengjiazhai Township (Chinese: 彭家寨; pinyin: Péngjiāzhài) is a township-level division situated in Handan, Hebei, China.

== See also ==
- List of township-level divisions of Hebei
