= Zhengzhang, China =

Zhengzhang 郑章镇
- Town
- Zhengzhangzhen
- Location in Hebei Zhengzhang (China)
- Coordinates: 38°23′03.9″N 115°15′54.7″E
- Country: People's Republic of China
- Province: Hebei
- Prefecture-level city: Baoding
- County-level city: Anguo

Area
  - Total: 53.33 km^{2} (20.59 sq mi)

Population (2010)
  - Total: 36,229
  - Density: 679.3/km^{2} (1,759/sq mi)
- Time zone: UTC+8 (China Standard)
- Local dialing code: 312

Zhengzhang (Chinese: 郑章镇; pinyin: Zhèngzhāng zhèn) is a town in Anguo, Baoding, Hebei, China. In 2010, Zhengzhang had a total population of 36,229: 18,214 males and 18,015 females: 4,990 aged under 14, 27,679 aged between 15 and 65, and 3,560 aged over 65.

== See also ==
- List of township-level divisions of Hebei
