= Chenzhuang, Xian County =

Chenzhuang 陈庄镇
- Town
- Chénzhuāng Zhèn
- Location in Hebei Location in China
- Coordinates: 38°05′43″N 116°07′03″E
- Country: People's Republic of China
- Province: Hebei
- Prefecture-level city: Cangzhou
- County-level city: Xian

Area
  - Total: 84.30 km^{2} (32.55 sq mi)

Population (2010)
  - Total: 32,968
  - Density: 391.1/km^{2} (1,013/sq mi)
- Time zone: UTC+8 (China Standard)

Chenzhuang (Chinese: 陈庄镇; pinyin: Chénzhuāng Zhèn) is a town located in Xian County, Cangzhou, Hebei, China. According to the 2010 census, Chenzhuang had a population of 32,968, including 16,785 males and 16,183 females. The population was distributed as follows: 6,141 people aged under 14, 24,113 people aged between 15 and 64, and 2,714 people aged over 65.

== See also ==
- List of township-level divisions of Hebei
