= Dong'angezhuang =

Dong'angezhuang 东安各庄镇
- Town
- Dōng'ān Gèzhuāng Zhèn
- Location in Hebei Location in China
- Coordinates: 39°47′36″N 118°39′36″E
- Country: People's Republic of China
- Province: Hebei
- Prefecture-level city: Tangshan
- County-level city: Luanzhou

Area
  - Total: 116.2 km^{2} (44.9 sq mi)

Population (2010)
  - Total: 62,809
  - Density: 540.6/km^{2} (1,400/sq mi)
- Time zone: UTC+8 (China Standard)

Dong'angezhuang (Chinese: 东安各庄镇; pinyin: Dōng'ān Gèzhuāng Zhèn) is a town located in Luanzhou, Tangshan, Hebei, China. According to the 2010 census, Dong'angezhuang had a population of 62,809, including 32,416 males and 30,393 females. The population was distributed as follows: 10,682 people aged under 14, 46,167 people aged between 15 and 64, and 5,960 people aged over 65.

== See also ==
- List of township-level divisions of Hebei
