= Taiyu Township =

Taiyu Township 台峪乡
- Township
- Táiyù Xiāng
- Location in Hebei Location in China
- Coordinates: 38°55′13.8″N 114°28′23.8″E
- Country: People's Republic of China
- Province: Hebei
- Prefecture-level city: Baoding
- County: Fuping County

Area
  - Total: 109.4 km^{2} (42.2 sq mi)

Population (2010)
  - Total: 6,718
  - Density: 61.4/km^{2} (159/sq mi)
- Time zone: UTC+8 (China Standard)
- Area code: 312

Taiyu Township (Chinese: 台峪乡; pinyin: Táiyù Xiāng) is a rural township in Fuping County, under the jurisdiction of Baoding, in Hebei Province, China. According to the 2010 Chinese census, it had a population of 6,718 people living within a total area of 109.4 square kilometers, resulting in a population density of approximately 61.4 inhabitants per square kilometer.

Demographic data from 2010 shows a gender distribution of 3,484 males (48.1%) and 3,234 females (51.9%). Age-wise, 21.2% (1,424 people) were aged 0–14, 68.1% (4,577) were 15–64 years old, and 10.7% (717) were aged 65 and above.

== See also ==
- List of township-level divisions of Hebei
