= Chengjitou Township =

Chengjitou Township 城计头乡
- Rural Township
- Chéngjìtóu Xiāng
- Location in Hebei Location in China
- Coordinates: 37°04′41″N 114°02′01″E
- Country: People's Republic of China
- Province: Hebei
- Prefecture-level city: Xingtai
- District: Xindou

Area
  - Total: 90.73 km^{2} (35.03 sq mi)

Population (2010)
  - Total: 9,195
  - Density: 101.3/km^{2} (262/sq mi)
- Time zone: UTC+8 (China Standard)

Chengjitou Township (Chinese: 城计头乡; pinyin: Chéngjìtóu Xiāng) is a rural township located in Xindou District, Xingtai, Hebei, China. According to the 2010 census, Chengjitou Township had a population of 9,195, including 4,657 males and 4,538 females. The population was distributed as follows: 1,768 people aged under 14, 6,817 people aged between 15 and 64, and 610 people aged over 65.

== See also ==
- List of township-level divisions of Hebei
