= Damafang Township =

Damafang 大马坊乡
- Township
- Damafangxiang
- Location in Hebei Damafang (China)
- Coordinates: 38°55′39.6″N 115°24′34.3″E
- Country: People's Republic of China
- Province: Hebei
- Prefecture-level city: Baoding
- District: Jingxiu District

Area
  - Total: 16.77 km^{2} (6.47 sq mi)

Population (2010)
  - Total: 17,011
  - Density: 1,014/km^{2} (2,627/sq mi)
- Time zone: UTC+8 (China Standard)
- Local dialing code: 312

Damafang (Chinese: 大马坊乡; pinyin: Dàmǎfāng xiāng) is a township in Jingxiu District, Baoding, Hebei, China. In 2010, Damafang had a total population of 17,011: 8,391 males and 8,620 females: 3,285 aged under 14, 12,516 aged between 15 and 65, and 1,210 aged over 65.

== See also ==
- List of township-level divisions of Hebei
