= Bai'an Township =

Bai'an Township 白岸乡
- Rural Township
- Bái'àn Xiāng
- Location in Hebei Location in China
- Coordinates: 37°04′27″N 113°49′02″E
- Country: People's Republic of China
- Province: Hebei
- Prefecture-level city: Xingtai
- District: Xindou

Area
  - Total: 114.2 km^{2} (44.1 sq mi)

Population (2010)
  - Total: 9,277
  - Density: 81.21/km^{2} (210.3/sq mi)
- Time zone: UTC+8 (China Standard)

Bai'an Township (Chinese: 白岸乡; pinyin: Bái'àn Xiāng) is a rural township located in Xindou District, Xingtai, Hebei, China. According to the 2010 census, Bai'an Township had a population of 9,277, including 4,669 males and 4,608 females. The population was distributed as follows: 1,669 people aged under 14, 6,900 people aged between 15 and 64, and 708 people aged over 65.

== See also ==
- List of township-level divisions of Hebei
