= Baimiaozi Township =

Baimiaozi Township 白庙子乡
- Rural Township
- Báimiàozi Xiāng
- Location in Hebei Location in China
- Coordinates: 40°11′24″N 118°15′25″E
- Country: People's Republic of China
- Province: Hebei
- Prefecture-level city: Tangshan
- County-level city: Qianxi

Area
  - Total: 63.14 km^{2} (24.38 sq mi)

Population (2010)
  - Total: 18,110
  - Density: 286.8/km^{2} (743/sq mi)
- Time zone: UTC+8 (China Standard)

Baimiaozi Township (Chinese: 白庙子乡; pinyin: Báimiàozi Xiāng) is a rural township located in Qianxi County, Tangshan, Hebei, China. According to the 2010 census, Baimiaozi Township had a population of 18,110, including 9,229 males and 8,881 females. The population was distributed as follows: 3,340 people aged under 14, 13,240 people aged between 15 and 64, and 1,530 people aged over 65.

== See also ==
- List of township-level divisions of Hebei
