= Fangshunqiao =

Fangshunqiao 方顺桥镇
- Town
- Fāngshùnqiáo Zhèn
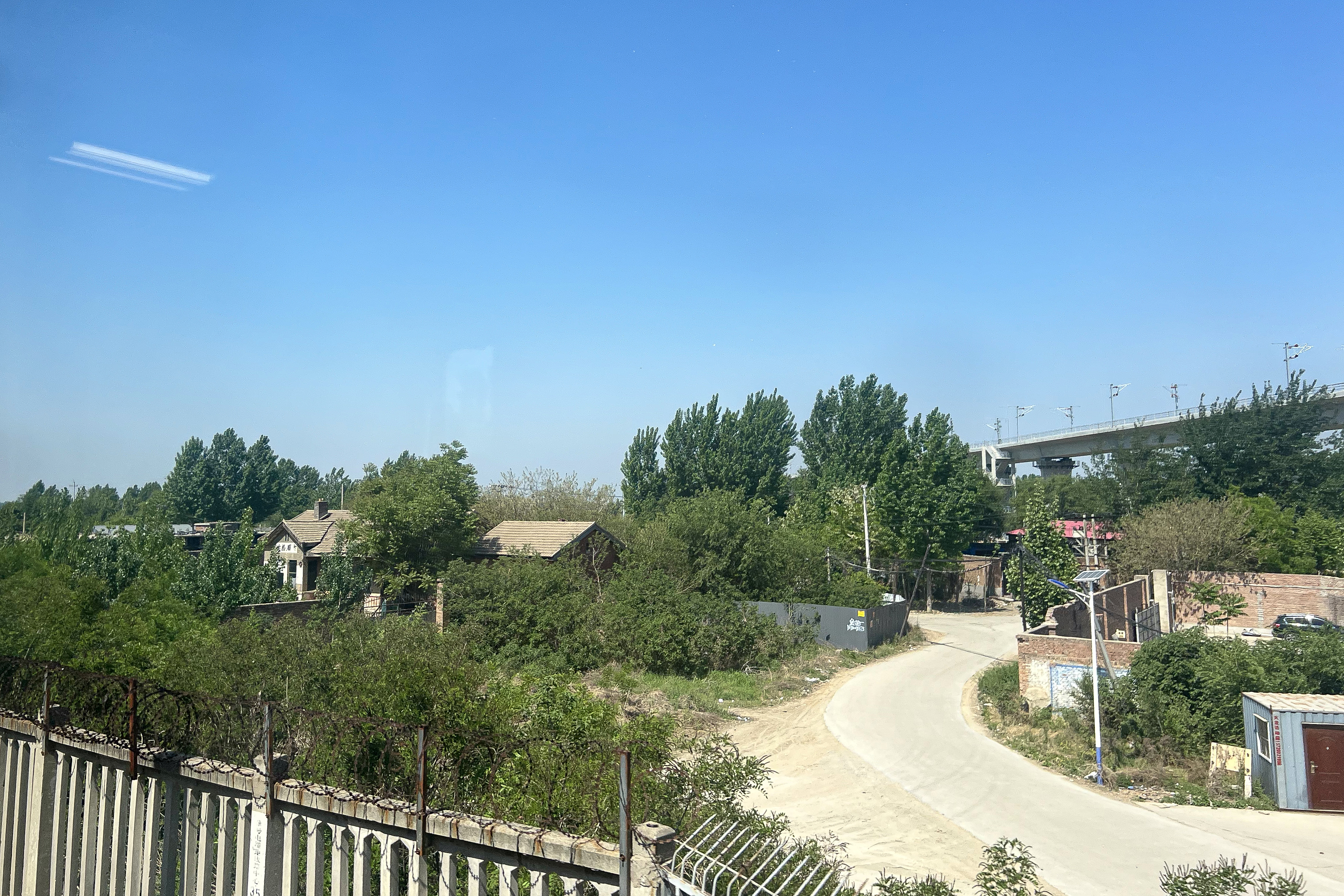

- Location in Hebei Location in China
- Coordinates: 38°46′25″N 115°15′40″E
- Country: People's Republic of China
- Province: Hebei
- Prefecture-level city: Baoding
- County-level city: Mancheng

Area
  - Total: 49.80 km^{2} (19.23 sq mi)

Population (2010)
  - Total: 42,574
  - Density: 855/km^{2} (2,210/sq mi)
- Time zone: UTC+8 (China Standard)

Fangshunqiao (Chinese: 方顺桥镇; pinyin: Fāngshùnqiáo Zhèn) is a town located in Mancheng District, Baoding, Hebei, China. According to the 2010 census, Fangshunqiao had a population of 42,574, including 21,640 males and 20,934 females. The population was distributed as follows: 7,509 people aged under 14, 31,541 people aged between 15 and 64, and 3,524 people aged over 65.

== See also ==
- List of township-level divisions of Hebei
