= Quantou Township =

Quantou Township 圈头乡
- Township
- Quantou Xiang
- Location in Hebei Location in China
- Coordinates: 38°51′48.4″N 116°01′41.6″E
- Country: People's Republic of China
- Province: Hebei
- Prefecture-level city: Baoding
- County: Anxin County

Area
  - Total: 51.23 km^{2} (19.78 sq mi)

Population (2010)
  - Total: 18,521
  - Density: 361.5/km^{2} (936/sq mi)
- Time zone: UTC+8 (China Standard)
- Area code: 312

Quantou Township (Chinese: 圈头乡; pinyin: Quāntóu Xiāng) is a rural township located in Anxin County, within the jurisdiction of Baoding, Hebei Province, China. As of the 2010 census, it had a population of 18,521, consisting of 8,926 males and 9,595 females. The age distribution included 4,171 people aged under 14, 12,612 between 15 and 64, and 1,738 aged 65 and older.

== See also ==
- List of township-level divisions of Hebei
