= Wangtan, Hebei =

Wangtan 王滩镇
- Town
- Interactive map of Wangtan
- Coordinates: 39°17′05″N 118°58′48″E
- Country: China
- Province: Hebei
- Prefecture-level city: Tangshan
- County: Laoting County
- Elevation: 4 m (13 ft)
- Time zone: UTC+8 (China Standard)

Wangtan (simplified Chinese: 王滩; traditional Chinese: 王灘; pinyin: Wángtān) is a town in Laoting County, in northeastern Hebei province, China.

== See also ==
- List of township-level divisions of Hebei
