= Nangang Town =

Nangang Town 南岗镇
- Town
- Location in Hebei
- Coordinates: 38°11′30″N 114°30′25″E
- Country: People's Republic of China
- Province: Hebei
- Prefecture-level city: Shijiazhuang
- County: Zhengding
- Village-level divisions: 19 villages
- Elevation: 83 m (272 ft)
- Time zone: UTC+8 (China Standard)
- Area code: 0311

Nangang Town (simplified Chinese: 南岗镇; traditional Chinese: 南崗鎮; pinyin: Nángǎng Zhèn) is a town of Zhengding County, Shijiazhuang, Hebei, China, located around 7 kilometres (4.3 mi) northwest of the county seat. As of 2011, it had 19 villages under its administration. It was Beizaoxian Township before 2021.

== See also ==
- List of township-level divisions of Hebei
