= Anziling Township =

Anziling Township 安子岭乡
- Rural Township
- Ānzilǐng Xiāng
- Location in Hebei Location in China
- Coordinates: 40°25′53″N 117°54′05″E
- Country: People's Republic of China
- Province: Hebei
- Prefecture-level city: Chengde
- County: Xinglong

Area
  - Total: 77.95 km^{2} (30.10 sq mi)

Population (2010)
  - Total: 5,194
  - Density: 66.63/km^{2} (172.6/sq mi)
- Time zone: UTC+8 (China Standard)

Anziling Township (Chinese: 安子岭乡; pinyin: Ānzilǐng Xiāng) is a rural township located in Xinglong County, Chengde, Hebei, China. According to the 2010 census, Anziling Township had a population of 5,194, including 2,713 males and 2,481 females. The population was distributed as follows: 900 people aged under 14, 3,822 people aged between 15 and 64, and 472 people aged over 65.

== See also ==
- List of township-level divisions of Hebei
