= Daiwangcheng =

Daiwangcheng 代王城镇
- Town
- Dàiwángchéng Zhèn
- Location in Hebei Location in China
- Coordinates: 39°53′30″N 114°40′19″E
- Country: People's Republic of China
- Province: Hebei
- Prefecture-level city: Zhangjiakou
- County-level city: Yu

Area
  - Total: 61.92 km^{2} (23.91 sq mi)

Population (2010)
  - Total: 27,282
  - Density: 440.6/km^{2} (1,141/sq mi)
- Time zone: UTC+8 (China Standard)

Daiwangcheng (Chinese: 代王城镇; pinyin: Dàiwángchéng Zhèn) is a town located in Yu County, Zhangjiakou, Hebei, China. It is named for Zhao Jia (趙嘉), the short lived King of Dai and successor to the Zhao State towards the end of the Warring States period.

According to the 2010 census, Daiwangcheng had a population of 27,282, including 14,119 males and 13,163 females. The population was distributed as follows: 5,528 people aged under 14, 19,116 people aged between 15 and 64, and 2,638 people aged over 65.

== See also ==
- List of township-level divisions of Hebei
