= Baituan Township =

Baituan Township 白团乡
- Rural Township
- Báituán Xiāng
- Location in Hebei Location in China
- Coordinates: 38°45′21″N 115°24′14″E
- Country: People's Republic of China
- Province: Hebei
- Prefecture-level city: Baoding
- District: Qingyuan

Area
  - Total: 49.07 km^{2} (18.95 sq mi)

Population (2010)
  - Total: 33,594
  - Density: 684.6/km^{2} (1,773/sq mi)
- Time zone: UTC+8 (China Standard)

Baituan Township (Chinese: 白团乡; pinyin: Báituán Xiāng) is a rural township located in Qingyuan District, Baoding, Hebei, China. According to the 2010 census, Baituan Township had a population of 33,594, including 17,115 males and 16,479 females. The population was distributed as follows: 5,301 people aged under 14, 25,252 people aged between 15 and 64, and 3,041 people aged over 65.

== See also ==
- List of township-level divisions of Hebei
