= Xiumen Subdistrict =

Coordinates: 38°01′57″N 114°30′01″E

Xiumen Subdistrict 休门街道
- Subdistrict

Chinese transcription(s)
- Interactive map of Xiumen Subdistrict
- Country: China
- Province: Hebei
- Prefecture: Shijiazhuang
- District: Qiaoxi District
- Time zone: UTC+8 (China Standard Time)

Xiumen Subdistrict (Chinese: 休门街道) is a township-level division of Qiaoxi District, Shijiazhuang, Hebei, China.

== See also ==
- List of township-level divisions of Hebei
