= Chenjiapu Township =

Chenjiapu Township 陈家铺乡
- Rural Township
- Chénjiāpū Xiāng
- Location in Hebei Location in China
- Coordinates: 39°46′43″N 117°42′31″E
- Country: People's Republic of China
- Province: Hebei
- Prefecture-level city: Tangshan
- County: Yutian

Area
  - Total: 37.51 km^{2} (14.48 sq mi)

Population (2010)
  - Total: 15,800
  - Density: 421.2/km^{2} (1,091/sq mi)
- Time zone: UTC+8 (China Standard)

Chenjiapu Township (Chinese: 陈家铺乡; pinyin: Chénjiāpū Xiāng) is a rural township located in Yutian County, Hebei, Tangshan, Hebei, China. According to the 2010 census, Chenjiapu Township had a population of 15,800, including 8,047 males and 7,753 females. The population was distributed as follows: 2,218 people aged under 14, 11,944 people aged between 15 and 64, and 1,638 people aged over 65.

== See also ==
- List of township-level divisions of Hebei
