= Dongmangyu =

Dongmangyu 东荒峪镇
- Town
- Dōnghuāngyù Zhèn
- Location in Hebei Location in China
- Coordinates: 40°12′11″N 118°23′37″E
- Country: People's Republic of China
- Province: Hebei
- Prefecture-level city: Tangshan
- County-level city: Qianxi

Area
  - Total: 69.73 km^{2} (26.92 sq mi)

Population (2010)
  - Total: 14,436
  - Density: 207/km^{2} (540/sq mi)
- Time zone: UTC+8 (China Standard)

Dongmangyu (Chinese: 东荒峪镇; pinyin: Dōnghuāngyù Zhèn) is a town located in Qianxi County, Tangshan, Hebei, China. According to the 2010 census, Dongmangyu had a population of 14,436, including 7,541 males and 6,895 females. The population was distributed as follows: 2,784 people aged under 14, 10,583 people aged between 15 and 64, and 1,069 people aged over 65.

== See also ==
- List of township-level divisions of Hebei
