= Chengzhuang =

Chengzhuang 程庄镇
- Town
- Chéngzhuāng Zhèn
- Location in Hebei Location in China
- Coordinates: 39°33′42″N 118°39′36″E
- Country: People's Republic of China
- Province: Hebei
- Prefecture-level city: Tangshan
- County: Luannan

Area
  - Total: 93.44 km^{2} (36.08 sq mi)

Population (2010)
  - Total: 50,828
  - Density: 544/km^{2} (1,410/sq mi)
- Time zone: UTC+8 (China Standard)

Chengzhuang (Chinese: 程庄镇; pinyin: Chéngzhuāng Zhèn) is a town located in Luannan County, Tangshan, Hebei, China. According to the 2010 census, Chengzhuang had a population of 50,828, including 26,127 males and 24,701 females. The population was distributed as follows: 8,308 people aged under 14, 37,210 people aged between 15 and 64, and 5,310 people aged over 65.

== See also ==
- List of township-level divisions of Hebei
