= Qiaotou Township, Baoding =

Qiaotou Township 桥头乡
- Subdistrict

Chinese transcription(s)
- Interactive map of Qiaotou Township
- Country: China
- Province: Hebei
- Prefecture: Baoding
- Time zone: UTC+8 (China Standard Time)

Qiaotou Township (Chinese: 桥头乡) is a township-level division situated in Baoding, Hebei, China.

== See also ==
- List of township-level divisions of Hebei
