= Baigou, Hebei =

Baigou 白沟镇
- Town
- Baigou Zhen
- Location in Hebei Location in China
- Coordinates: 39°07′14.6″N 116°01′25.4″E
- Country: People's Republic of China
- Province: Hebei
- Prefecture-level city: Baoding
- County-level city: Gaobeidian

Area
  - Total: 60.28 km^{2} (23.27 sq mi)

Population (2010)
  - Total: 124,274
  - Density: 2,062/km^{2} (5,340/sq mi)
- Time zone: UTC+8 (China Standard)
- Local dialing code: 312

Baigou (Chinese: 白沟镇; pinyin: Báigōu Zhèn) is a town located in Gaobeidian, Baoding, Hebei, China. According to the 2010 census, Baigou had a population of 124,274, including 63,867 males and 60,407 females. The population was distributed as follows: 16,736 people aged under 14, 103,138 people aged between 15 and 64, and 4,400 people aged over 65.

== See also ==
- List of township-level divisions of Hebei
