= Beixiaozhuang Township =

Beixiaozhuang Township 北小庄乡
- Rural Township
- Běixiǎozhuāng Xiāng
- Location in Hebei Location in China
- Coordinates: 37°14′49″N 114°11′05″E
- Country: People's Republic of China
- Province: Hebei
- Prefecture-level city: Xingtai
- County-level city: Xindou

Area
  - Total: 115.5 km^{2} (44.6 sq mi)

Population (2010)
  - Total: 8,156
  - Density: 70.63/km^{2} (182.9/sq mi)
- Time zone: UTC+8 (China Standard)

Beixiaozhuang Township (Chinese: 北小庄乡; pinyin: Běixiǎozhuāng Xiāng) is a rural township located in Xindou District, Xingtai, Hebei, China. According to the 2010 census, Beixiaozhuang Township had a population of 8,156, including 4,149 males and 4,007 females. The population was distributed as follows: 1,226 people aged under 14, 6,180 people aged between 15 and 64, and 750 people aged over 65.

== See also ==
- List of township-level divisions of Hebei
