= Baijiacun Subdistrict =

Baijiacun Subdistrict 百家村街道
- Urban Subdistrict
- Bǎijiācūn Jiēdào
- Location in Hebei Location in China
- Coordinates: 36°37′01″N 114°26′24″E
- Country: People's Republic of China
- Province: Hebei
- Prefecture-level city: Handan
- District: Fuxing

Area
  - Total: 5.628 km^{2} (2.173 sq mi)

Population (2010)
  - Total: 29,775
- Time zone: UTC+8 (China Standard)

Baijiacun Subdistrict (Chinese: 百家村街道; pinyin: Bǎijiācūn Jiēdào) is an urban subdistrict located in Fuxing District, Handan, Hebei, China. According to the 2010 census, Baijiacun Subdistrict had a population of 29,775, including 15,087 males and 14,688 females. The population was distributed as follows: 4,083 people aged under 14, 22,873 people aged between 15 and 64, and 2,819 people aged over 65.

== See also ==
- List of township-level divisions of Hebei
