= Fengyingzi =

Fengyingzi 冯营子镇
- Town
- Féngyíngzi Zhèn
- Location in Hebei Location in China
- Coordinates: 40°53′32″N 117°56′40″E
- Country: People's Republic of China
- Province: Hebei
- Prefecture-level city: Chengde
- District: Shuangqiao

Area
  - Total: 58.99 km^{2} (22.78 sq mi)

Population (2010)
  - Total: 39,757
  - Density: 674/km^{2} (1,750/sq mi)
- Time zone: UTC+8 (China Standard)

Fengyingzi (Chinese: 冯营子镇; pinyin: Féngyíngzi Zhèn) is a town located in Shuangqiao District, Chengde, Hebei, China. According to the 2010 census, Fengyingzi had a population of 39,757, including 18,703 males and 21,054 females. The population was distributed as follows: 3,197 people aged under 14, 35,551 people aged between 15 and 64, and 1,009 people aged over 65.

== See also ==
- List of township-level divisions of Hebei
