= Yangjiazhuang Township, Hebei =

Yangjiazhuang 杨家庄乡
- Township
- Yángjiāzhuāng Xiāng
- Location in Hebei Yangjiazhuang (China)
- Coordinates: 38°29′33.4″N 115°04′34.9″E
- Country: People's Republic of China
- Province: Hebei
- Prefecture-level city: Baoding
- County-level city: Dingzhou

Area
  - Total: 36.28 km^{2} (14.01 sq mi)

Population (2010)
  - Total: 30,426
  - Density: 838.5/km^{2} (2,172/sq mi)
- Time zone: UTC+8 (China Standard)
- Local dialing code: 312

Yangjiazhuang (Chinese: 杨家庄乡; pinyin: Yángjiāzhuāng xiāng) is a township in Dingzhou, Baoding, Hebei, China. As of the 2010 census, Yangjiazhuang had a total population of 30,426: 15,328 males and 15,098 females. The population is distributed as follows: 5,307 people aged under 14, 22,332 people aged between 15 and 64, and 2,787 people aged over 65.

== See also ==
List of township-level divisions of Hebei
