= Changliang Township =

Changliang Township 长梁乡
- Rural Township
- Chángliáng Xiāng
- Location in Sichuan Location in China
- Coordinates: 31°01′27″N 106°17′22″E
- Country: People's Republic of China
- Province: Sichuan
- Prefecture-level city: Nanchong
- County-level city: Peng'an

Area
  - Total: 33.30 km^{2} (12.86 sq mi)

Population (2010)
  - Total: 16,666
  - Density: 500.4/km^{2} (1,296/sq mi)
- Time zone: UTC+8 (China Standard)

Changliang Township (Chinese: 长梁乡; pinyin: Chángliáng Xiāng) is a rural township located in Peng'an County, Nanchong, Sichuan, China. According to the 2010 census, Changliang Township had a population of 16,666, including 8,417 males and 8,249 females. The population was distributed as follows: 2,575 people aged under 14, 12,124 people aged between 15 and 64, and 1,967 people aged over 65.

== See also ==
- List of township-level divisions of Sichuan
