= Fuxing, Handan =

Fuxing 复兴区
- District
- Location in Hebei
- Coordinates: 36°37′00″N 114°26′54″E
- Country: People's Republic of China
- Province: Hebei
- Prefecture-level city: Handan

Area
  - Total: 37 km^{2} (14 sq mi)
- Elevation: 72 m (236 ft)

Population
  - Total: 250,000
  - Density: 6,800/km^{2} (17,000/sq mi)
- Time zone: UTC+8 (China Standard)
- Postal code: 056003
- Division code: FXQ

Fuxing District (simplified Chinese: 复兴区; traditional Chinese: 復興區; pinyin: Fùxīng Qū) is a district of the city of Handan, Hebei province, China, with a population of 250,000 residing in an area of 37 km^{2} (14 sq mi).

== Administrative divisions ==
The district has control over 7 subdistricts and 1 township.

Subdistricts:

- Shengliqiao Subdistrict (胜利桥街道), Pangcun Subdistrict (庞村街道), Tieludayuan Subdistrict (铁路大院街道), Shihua Subdistrict (石化街道), Hualin Road Subdistrict (化林路街道), Erliuqisan Subdistrict (二六七二街道), Baijiacun Subdistrict (百家村街道)

The only township is Pengjiazhai Township (彭家寨乡)
