= Fengrun Town =

Fengrun Town 丰润镇
- Town
- Fēngrùn Zhèn
- Location in Shanxi Location in China
- Coordinates: 38°14′37″N 111°52′10″E
- Country: People's Republic of China
- Province: Shanxi
- Prefecture-level city: Xinzhou
- County-level city: Jingle

Area
  - Total: 97.25 km^{2} (37.55 sq mi)

Population (2010)
  - Total: 5,528
  - Density: 56.84/km^{2} (147.2/sq mi)
- Time zone: UTC+8 (China Standard)

Fengrun Town (Chinese: 丰润镇; pinyin: Fēngrùn Zhèn) is a town located in Jingle County, Xinzhou, Shanxi, China. According to the 2010 census, Fengrun Town had a population of 5,528, including 2,919 males and 2,609 females. The population was distributed as follows: 898 people aged under 14, 3,971 people aged between 15 and 64, and 659 people aged over 65.

== See also ==
- List of township-level divisions of Shanxi
