= Gaowan =

Gaowan 高湾镇
- Town
- Gāowān Zhèn
- Location in Gansu Location in China
- Coordinates: 36°27′39″N 104°59′37″E
- Country: People's Republic of China
- Province: Gansu
- Prefecture-level city: Baiyin
- County-level city: Jingyuan

Area
  - Total: 569.0 km^{2} (219.7 sq mi)

Population (2010)
  - Total: 25,993
  - Density: 45.68/km^{2} (118.3/sq mi)
- Time zone: UTC+8 (China Standard)

Gaowan (Chinese: 高湾镇; pinyin: Gāowān Zhèn) is a town located in Jingyuan County, Baiyin, Gansu, China. According to the 2010 census, Gaowan had a population of 25,993, including 13,481 males and 12,512 females. The population was distributed as follows: 4,577 people aged under 14, 19,913 people aged between 15 and 64, and 1,503 people aged over 65.

== See also ==
- List of township-level divisions of Gansu
