= Gaoling Township =

Gaoling Township 高岭乡
- Rural Township
- Gāolĭng Xiāng
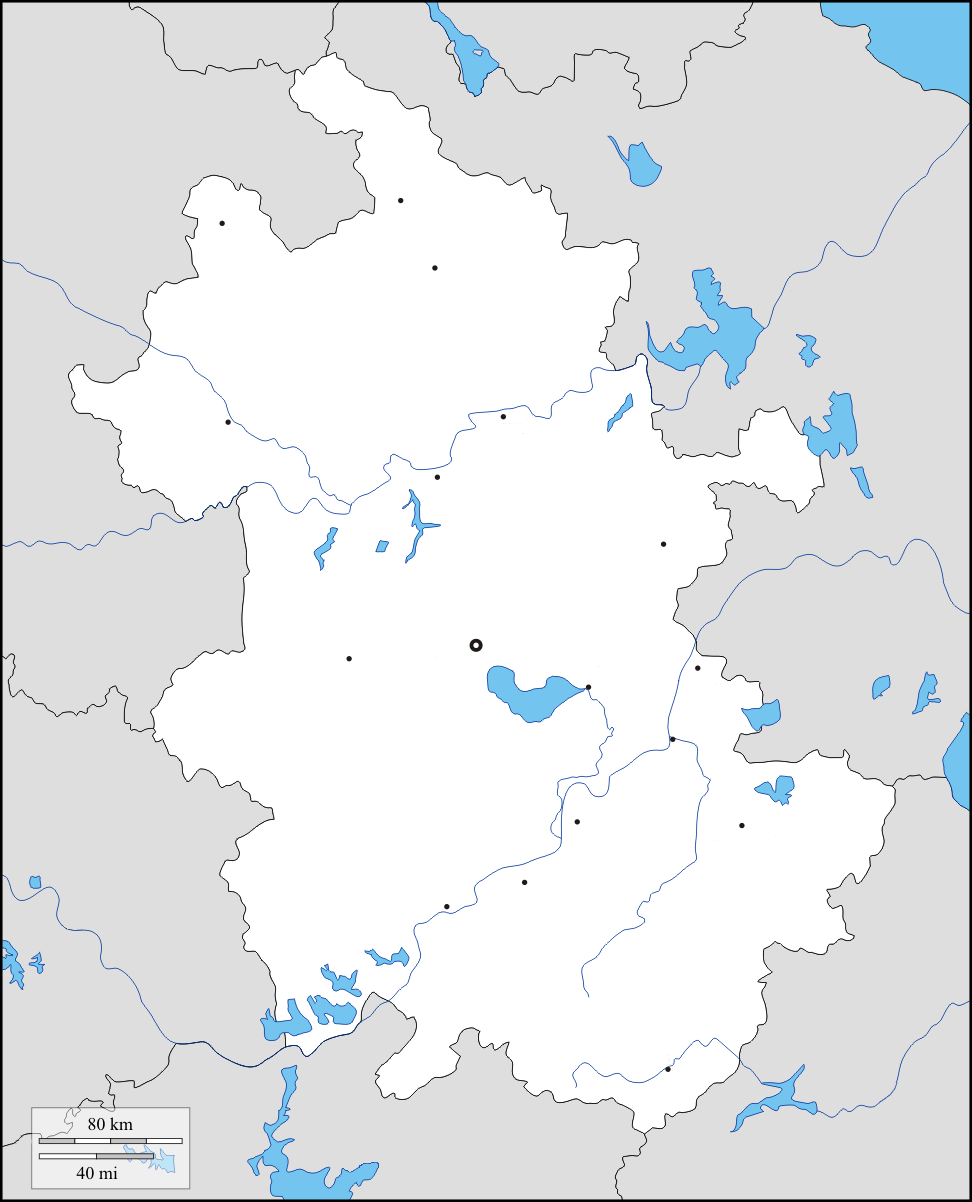
- Location in Anhui Location in China
- Coordinates: 30°15′16″N 116°18′51″E
- Country: People's Republic of China
- Province: Anhui
- Prefecture-level city: Anqing
- County: Susong

Area
  - Total: 49.30 km^{2} (19.03 sq mi)

Population (2010)
  - Total: 13,594
  - Density: 275.7/km^{2} (714/sq mi)
- Time zone: UTC+8 (China Standard)

Gaoling Township (Chinese: 高岭乡; pinyin: Gāolĭng Xiāng) is a rural township located in Susong County, Anqing, Anhui, China. According to the 2010 census, Gaoling Township had a population of 13,594, including 6,836 males and 6,758 females. The population was distributed as follows: 3,775 people aged under 14, 7,866 people aged between 15 and 64, and 1,953 people aged over 65.

== See also ==
- List of township-level divisions of Anhui
