= Chengzi Township =

Chengzi Township 城子乡
- Rural Township
- Chéngzi Xiāng
- Location in Inner Mongolia Location in China
- Coordinates: 42°08′36″N 118°41′32″E
- Country: People's Republic of China
- Province: Inner Mongolia
- Prefecture-level city: Chifeng
- County-level city: Songshan

Area
  - Total: 357.3 km^{2} (138.0 sq mi)

Population (2010)
  - Total: 23,814
  - Density: 66.65/km^{2} (172.6/sq mi)
- Time zone: UTC+8 (China Standard)

Chengzi Township (Chinese: 城子乡; pinyin: Chéngzi Xiāng) is a rural township located in Songshan District, Chifeng, Inner Mongolia, China. According to the 2010 census, Chengzi Township had a population of 23,814, including 12,365 males and 11,449 females. The population was distributed as follows: 3,727 people aged under 14, 18,010 people aged between 15 and 64, and 2,077 people aged over 65.

== See also ==
- List of township-level divisions of Inner Mongolia
