= Monan, Hebei =

Monan 陌南镇
- Town
- Location in Hebei
- Coordinates: 38°15′47″N 115°57′22″E
- Country: People's Republic of China
- Province: Hebei
- Prefecture-level city: Cangzhou
- County: Xian
- Village-level divisions: 33 villages
- Elevation: 16 m (52 ft)
- Time zone: UTC+8 (China Standard)
- Area code: 0317

Monan (Chinese: 陌南; pinyin: Mònán) is a town under the administration of Xian County in east-central Hebei province, China, located 16 kilometres (9.9 mi) northwest of the county seat and near the border between the prefecture-level cities of Cangzhou and Hengshui. As of 2011, it has 33 villages under its administration.

== See also ==
- List of township-level divisions of Hebei
