= Liuzao, Hebei =

Liuzao 留早镇
- Town
- Liuzaozhen
- Location in Hebei Liuzao (China)
- Coordinates: 38°36′04.8″N 115°09′19.9″E
- Country: People's Republic of China
- Province: Hebei
- Prefecture-level city: Baoding
- County-level city: Dingzhou

Area
  - Total: 80.99 km^{2} (31.27 sq mi)

Population (2010)
  - Total: 44,367
  - Density: 547.8/km^{2} (1,419/sq mi)
- Time zone: UTC+8 (China Standard)
- Local dialing code: 312

Liuzao (Chinese: 留早镇; pinyin: Liúzǎo zhèn) is a town in Dingzhou, Baoding, Hebei, China. In 2010, Liuzao had a total population of 44,367: 22,527 males and 21,840 females: 7,849 aged under 14, 32,401 aged between 15 and 65, and 4,117 aged over 65.

== See also ==
- List of township-level divisions of Hebei
