= Chaoyang Subdistrict, Tianjin =

Subdistrict in Baodi District, Tianjin, China

Chaoyang Subdistrict 潮阳街道
- Subdistrict
- Location of Chaoyang Subdistrict in Tianjin Chaoyang Subdistrict (China)
- Coordinates: 39°39′51″N 117°16′01″E
- Country: China
- Municipality: Tianjin
- District: Baodi
- Village-level Divisions: 5 residential communities 22 villages

Area
  - Total: 51.29 km^{2} (19.80 sq mi)
- Elevation: 6 m (20 ft)

Population (2010)
  - Total: 30,090
  - Density: 586.7/km^{2} (1,519/sq mi)
- Time zone: UTC+8 (CST)
- Postal code: 301815
- Area code: 022

Chaoyang Subdistrict (simplified Chinese: 潮阳街道; traditional Chinese: 潮陽街道; pinyin: Cháoyáng Jiēdào), formerly known as Majiadian, is a subdistrict located within Baodi District, Tianjin, China. It shares border with Baoping Subdistrict and Shigezhuang Town in its north, Yuhua Subdistrict in its northeast, Haogezhuang Town in its east, Dakoutun Town in its south, and Xinkaikou Town in its west. It had 30,090 people residing within its borders as of 2010.

== Geography ==
Chaoyang Subdistrict is located on the southern shore of Chaobai River, with Beijing–Tangshan Intercity Railway passing through its north. It has an altitude of 6 meters above the sea level.

== History ==
History of Chaoyang Subdistrict
| Year | Status | Belong to |
|---|---|---|
| 1946 – 1958 | Under 3rd District | Baodi County, Hebei |
| 1958 – 1961 | Under Dakoutun People's Commune | Baodi County, Hebei |
| 1961 – 1973 | Majiadian People's Commune | Baodi County, Hebei |
| 1973 – 1983 | Majiadian People's Commune | Baodi County, Tianjin |
| 1983 – 2001 | Majiadian Township | Baodi County, Tianjin |
| 2001 – 2013 | Majiadian Town | Baodi District, Tianjin |
| 2013 – present | Chaoyang Subdistrict | Baodi District, Tianjin |

== Administrative divisions ==
At the end of 2022, Chaoyang subdistrict had 27 subdivisions, including the following 5 residential communities and 22 villages:

=== Residential communities ===
- Haorun (浩润)
- Lanting (蓝庭)
- Zhannan (站南)
- Zhanbei (站北)
- Xiangdi (香坻)

=== Villages ===
- Majiadian (马家店)
- Zhuangtou (庄头)
- Xiaotao (小套)
- Ganquan (甘泉)
- Yuxinzhuang (于辛庄)
- Qiaoxinzhuang (乔辛庄)
- Guoyuan Xinzhuang (果园辛庄)
- Miaoxinzhuang (庙辛庄)
- Lianziying (连子营)
- Wangxinzhuang (王辛庄)
- Dalangezhuang (大兰各庄)
- Xiaolangezhuang (小兰各庄)
- Xiaozhaogezhuang (小赵各庄)
- Yuanjiazhuang (苑家庄)
- Shuangwangsi (双王寺)
- Shaojiao (烧角)
- Yangezhuang (闫各庄)
- Aigezhuang (艾各庄)
- Dong Guanglinmu (东广林木)
- Xi Guanglinmu (西广林木)
- Xiao Guanglinmu (小广林木)
- Magezhuang (马各庄)

== See also ==
- List of township-level divisions of Tianjin
