= Zhouliang Subdistrict =

Subdistrict in Baodi District, Tianjin, China

Zhouliang Subdistrict 周良街道
- Subdistrict
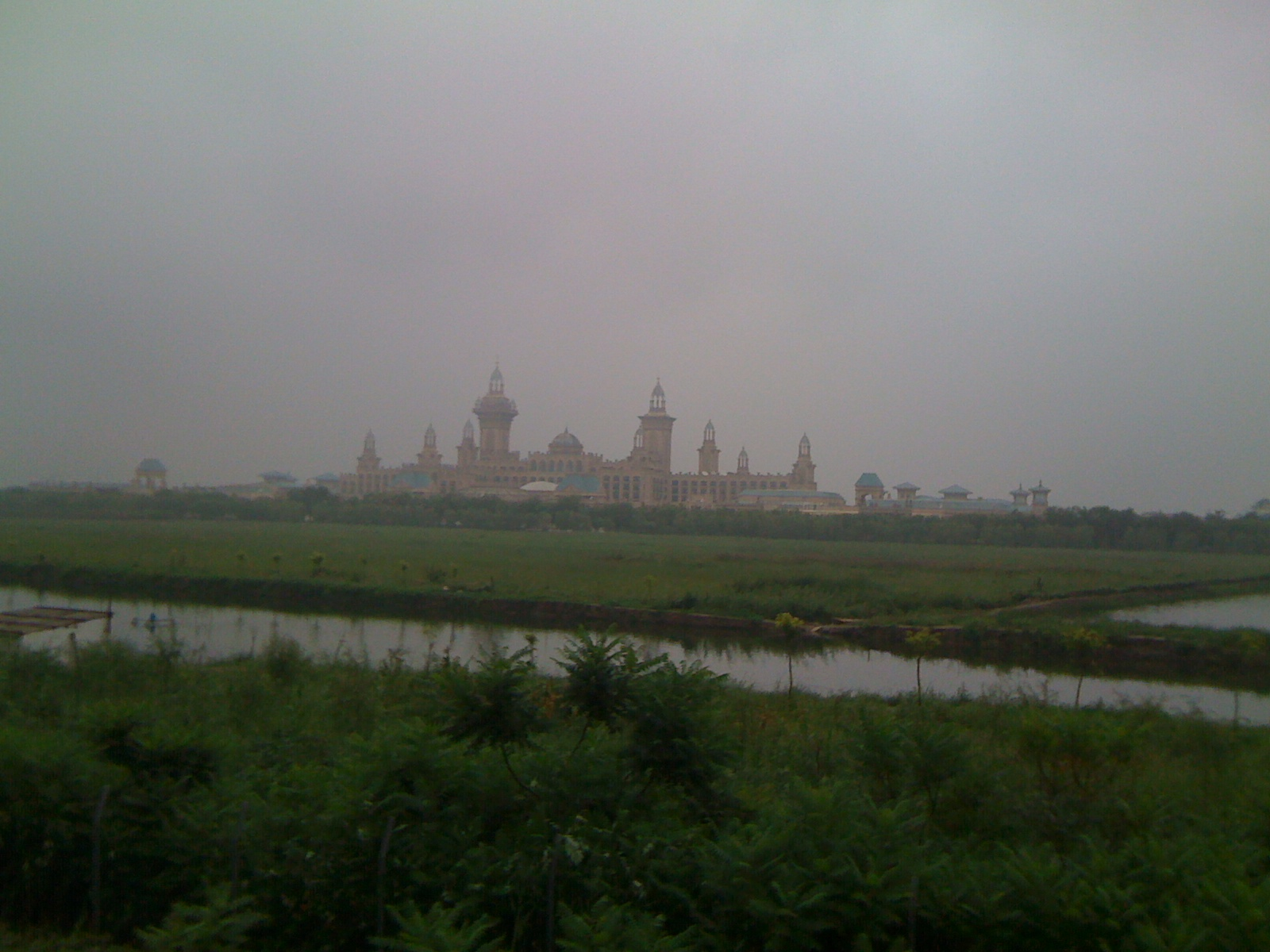
- View of Zhouliang Subdistrict on Tianjin-Jizhou Expressway

- Location of Zhouliang Subdistrict in Tianjin Zhouliang Subdistrict (China)
- Coordinates: 39°33′59″N 117°22′27″E
- Country: China
- Municipality: Tianjin
- District: Baodi
- Village-level Divisions: 8 residential communities 24 villages

Area
  - Total: 28.13 km^{2} (10.86 sq mi)
- Elevation: 4 m (13 ft)

Population (2010)
  - Total: 12,144
  - Density: 431.7/km^{2} (1,118/sq mi)
- Time zone: UTC+8 (CST)
- Postal code: 301830
- Area code: 022

Zhouliang Subdistrict (Chinese: 周良街道; pinyin: Zhōuliáng Jiēdào), formerly Zhouliangzhuang, is a subdistrict located in the west portion of Baodi District, Tianjin, China. It shares border with Haogezhuang Town in its north, Koudong and Huangzhuang Towns in its east, Dabaizhuang in its south, as well as Niujiapai and Dakoutun Towns in its west. It had 12,144 residents as per the 2010 census.

== Geography ==
Zhouliang Subdistrict lies on the west of Chaobai River, with Tianjin-Jizhou Expressway and Tangshan-Langfang Highway passing through the subdistrict. It has an average altitude of 4 meters.

== History ==
History of Zhouliang Subdistrict
| Year | Status | Belong to |
|---|---|---|
| 1949 – 1958 | Under 4th District | Baodi County, Hebei |
| 1958 – 1961 | Under Heilangkou People's Commune | Baodi County, Hebei |
| 1961 – 1973 | Zhouliangzhuang People's Commune | Baodi County, Hebei |
| 1973 – 1983 | Zhouliangzhuang People's Commune | Baodi County, Tianjin |
| 1983 – 2001 | Zhouliangzhuang Township | Baodi County, Tianjin |
| 2001 – 2013 | Zhouliangzhuang Town | Baodi District, Tianjin |
| 2013 – present | Zhouliang Town | Baodi District, Tianjin |

== Administrative divisions ==
In the year 2022, Zhouliang subdistrict had 32 subdivisions, including 8 residential communities and 24 villages:

=== Residential communities ===
- Shuiyuan (水苑)
- Wenquancheng (温泉城)
- Xiangjiang (香江)
- Taifu Ganlanshu
  (泰富橄榄树)
- Shangjing Jiayuan (上京嘉园)
- Yuandacheng (远大城)
- Lizigu (里自沽)
- Jingjin Xincheng (京津新城)

=== Villages ===
- Zhouliangzhuang (周良庄)
- Fanzhuangzi (樊庄子)
- Dazhuangzi (大庄子)
- Chenzhuangzi (陈庄子)
- Xinzhuangzi (辛庄子)
- Xiaozhuangzi (孝庄子)
- Hejiapu (何家铺)
- Tianxingzhuang (田邢庄)
- Wangchaozhuang (王草庄)
- Zhanggangpu (张岗铺)
- Yinjiapu (尹家铺)
- Xiaozhuangzi (小庄子)
- Maying (马营)
- Wulitai (五里台)
- Siligang (四里港)
- Zhaocongzhuang (赵聪庄)
- Dayangzhuang (大杨庄)
- Fanjiazhuang (范家庄)
- Tianjiaqiao (田家桥)
- Zhujiawo (朱家窝)
- Nanyang Matou (南杨码头)
- Beiyang Matou (北杨码头)
- Tianshuijing (甜水井)
- Jinjiazhuang (靳家庄)

== See also ==
- List of township-level divisions of Tianjin
