= Shuyang, Hebei =

Shuyang 淑阳镇
- Town
- Location of Shuyang in Hebei
- Coordinates: 39.75318°N 116.9814°E
- Country: China
- Province: Hebei
- Prefecture: Langfang
- County: Xianghe County

Population (2010)
  - Total: 103,659
- Time zone: UTC+8 (China Standard Time)

Shuyang (simplified Chinese: 淑阳镇; traditional Chinese: 淑陽鎮; pinyin: Shūyáng Zhèn) is a town situated in Xianghe County, Langfang, Hebei, China. Shuyang serves as the administrative center of Xianghe County. According to the 2010 Chinese Census, Shuyang's population is 103,659.

== History ==
In 1956, the area was incorporated as Chengguan Township (Chinese: 城关乡). In 1958, Chengguan became a people's commune. In 1983, Chengguan People's Commune was replaced by the town of Shuyang.

In 1996, the former townships of Jinxinzhuang (Chinese: 金辛庄乡) and Daluo (Chinese: 大罗乡) were merged into Shuyang.

== Geography ==
Shuyang is located in the western portion of central Xianghe County, along the southern banks of the Chaobai River.

== Administrative divisions ==
Shuyang administers 19 residential communities and 52 administrative villages.

== Demographics ==
Historical population
Year	Pop.	±%
1997	59,000	—
2000	67,660	+14.7%
2002	64,900	−4.1%
2010	103,659	+59.7%

According to the 2010 Chinese Census, Shuyang's population was 103,659. A 2002 estimate put Shuyang's population at about 64,900. Shuyang's population in 2000 was 67,660, per the 2000 Chinese Census. A 1997 estimate put Shuyang's population at about 59,000.

== Transportation ==
The Tongtang Highway (Chinese: 通唐公路) passes through Shuyang. The Xia'an Highway (Chinese: 夏安公路), which travels from Xiadian in Dachang Hui Autonomous County, to Anping in Xianghe County, also passes through Shuyang.

== See also ==
- List of township-level divisions of Hebei
