= Shuyang (disambiguation) =

Shuyang may refer to several places in China:

- Shuyang County (沭阳县) in Suqian City, Jiangsu Province
- Shuyang, Xianghe County (淑阳镇), a town in Xianghe County, Hebei
- Shuyang, Nanjing County (书洋镇), a town in Nanjing County, Fujian
