= Zhaoxia Subdistrict =

Subdistrict in Baodi District, Tianjin, China

Zhaoxia Subdistrict 朝霞街道
- Subdistrict
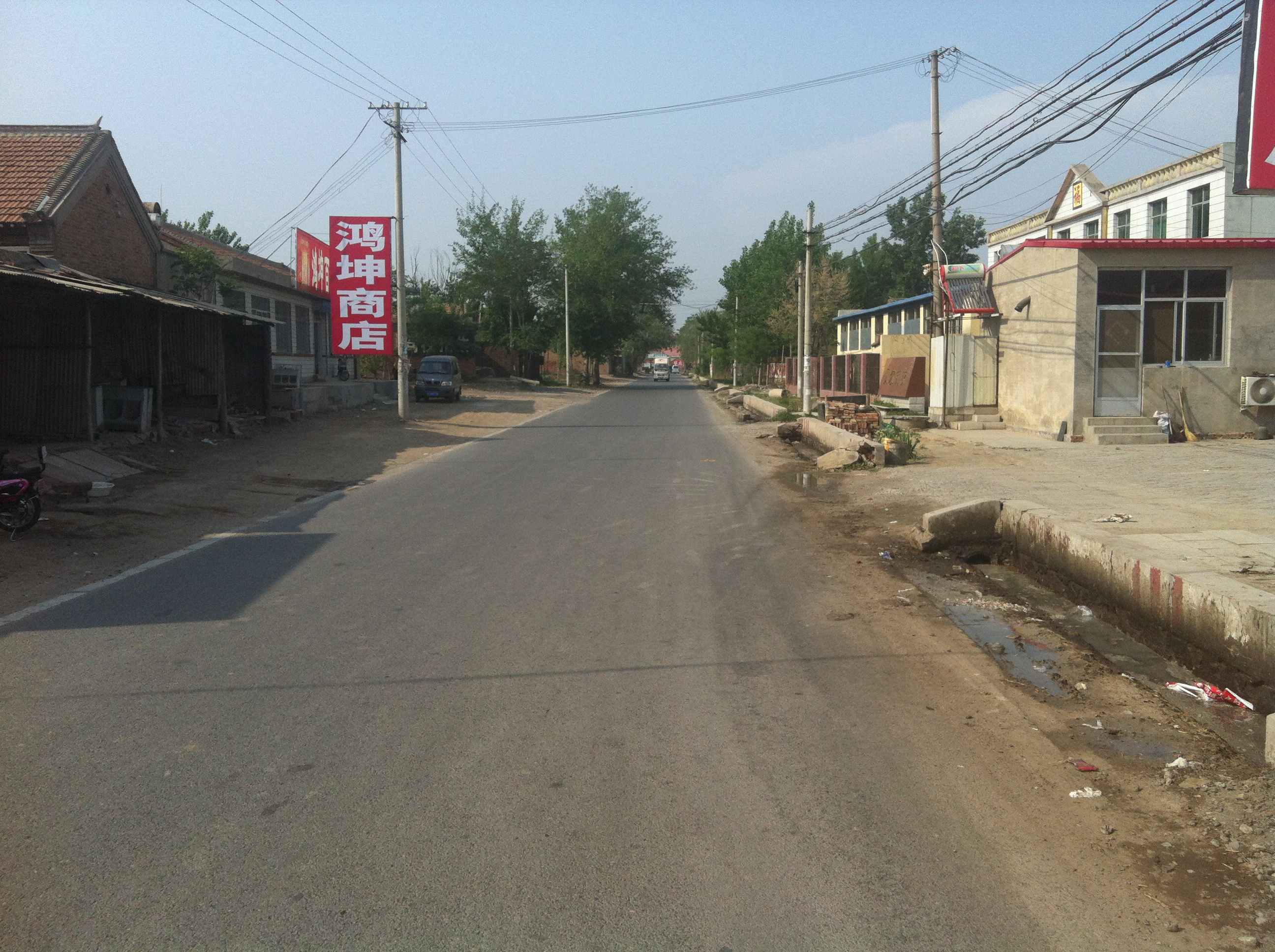
- Jizhou-Baodi Road within Zhaoxia Subdistrict

- Location of Zhaoxia Subdistrict in Tianjin Zhaoxia Subdistrict (China)
- Coordinates: 39°44′25″N 117°16′43″E
- Country: China
- Municipality: Tianjin
- District: Baodi
- Village-level Divisions: 1 residential community 51 villages

Area
  - Total: 42.91 km^{2} (16.57 sq mi)
- Elevation: 8 m (26 ft)

Population (2010)
  - Total: 39,941
  - Density: 930.8/km^{2} (2,411/sq mi)
- Time zone: UTC+8 (CST)
- Postal code: 301818
- Area code: 022

Zhaoxia Subdistrict (Chinese: 朝霞街道; pinyin: Zhāoxiá Jiēdào) is a subdistrict located on northern Baodi District, Tianjin, China. It shares border with Houjiaying Town in its north, Huogezhuang Town in its east, Haibin and Baoping Subdistricts in its south, as well as Shigezhuang and Niudaokou Towns in its west. In 2010, its census population was 39,941.

== History ==
Timeline of Zhaoxia Subdistrict
Year	Status	Belong to
1953 – 1958	Under Sanchakou Township	Baodi County, Hebei
1958 – 1961	Under Chengguan People's Commune	Baodi County, Hebei
1961 – 1973	Gaojiazhuang People's Commune; Sanchakou People's Commune	Baodi County, Hebei
1973 – 1983	Gaojiazhuang People's Commune; Sanchakou People's Commune	Baodi County, Tianjin
1983 – 2001	Gaojiazhuang Township; Sanchakou Township	Baodi County, Tianjin
2001 – 2013	Gaojiazhuang Town	Baodi District, Tianjin
2013 – present	Zhaoxia Subdistrict	Baodi District, Tianjin

== Administrative divisions ==
In 2022, Zhaoxia subdistrict was divided into 52 subdivisions, including one residential communities and 51 villages:

=== Residential community ===
- Wanjinfu (万锦府)

=== Villages ===
- Gaojiazhuang (高家庄)
- Xihewu Yicun (西河务一村)
- Xihewu Ercun (西河务二村)
- Xiherwu Sancun (西河务三村)
- Xihewu Xiaocun (西河务小村)
- Dingjiazhuang (丁家庄)
- Liyuanzhuang (李苑庄)
- Jiazhuang (贾庄)
- Shanzhuang (单庄)
- Pengzhuang (彭庄)
- Luojiawu (罗家务)
- Zhangxinzhuang (张辛庄)
- Hetaoyuan (核桃园)
- Duzhuangzi (杜庄子)
- Qiaotou Xinzhuang (桥头辛庄)
- Yangzhuang (杨庄)
- Qiujia'an (岳家庵)
- Beiyuanzhuang (北苑庄)
- Lisanyuancun (李三元村)
- Hujiayuan (胡家园)
- Qiaotou (桥头)
- Aiyanggezhuang (艾杨各庄)
- Wangpucun (王甫村)
- Youhucun (尤户村)
- Beiaigezhuang (北艾各庄)
- Qian Lianhuacun (前莲花村)
- Hou Lianhuacun (后莲花村)
- Guanqu (管渠)
- Jiaqu (贾曲)
- Qianxiyuan (前西苑)
- Houxiyuan (后西苑)
- Dingjiatao (丁家套)
- Zhaoxia Xinzhuang (朝霞辛庄)
- Zhaoxia Xiaozhuang (朝霞小庄)
- Zhaoxia Dianzi (朝霞店子)
- Zhaoxia Zhouzhuang (朝霞周庄)
- Yujiaguan (于家观)
- Danjiezi (单街子)
- Sanchakou (三岔口)
- Bangdaogu (帮道沽)
- Xiaojiafeng (肖家堼)
- Liuzhuang (刘庄)
- Xihui (西会)
- Zhonghui (中会)
- Donghui (东会)
- Dongwucun (东吴村)
- Houbaimiao (后白庙)
- Liujurenzhuang (刘举人庄)
- Zhangfengzhuang (张丰庄)
- Xiaobeitai (小北台)
- Huangxinzhuang (黄辛庄)

== See also ==
- List of township-level divisions of Tianjin
