= Ahmadiyya in China =

Islamic movement

Ahmadiyya under the spiritual leadership of the caliph in London is an Islamic community in China. Although the history of the Ahmadiyya movement in China starts in the early 20th century, reportedly during the lifetime of the first caliph of the movement, Hakeem Noor-ud-Din, there are no known organized Ahmadi communities in existence, besides a number of refugees, students and expatriates. The Chinese section of the movement is itself based in Surrey, United Kingdom, as opposed to being based in China.

== History ==
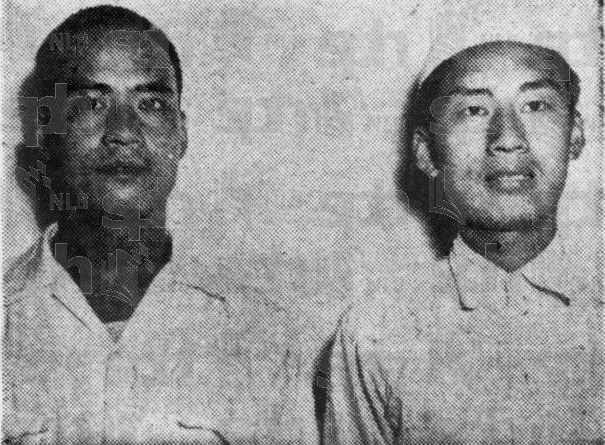
Mohammad Chong from Beijing, Osman Chau from Anhui, two of the four Chinese students heading to Pakistan, for religious missionary training, 1949.

In the year 1949, four Ahmadi Muslim Chinese students, from various parts of China, sailed via Singapore on SS Shirala, for Rabwah, Pakistan, in order to undergo a five-year course at the Pakistani branch of the Ahmadiyya University of Theology and Languages. The students, all in their twenties, were Mohammad Chong from Beijing, Osman Chau from Anhui, Idris Wong and Ibrahim Ma, both from Shandong. While Chong previously studied at an Islamic school in the capital, the rest were students of Nanjing University. In the year 1990, Osman Chau translated the Quran in Mandarin Chinese.

By 2011, there were approximately 60 Ahmadi Muslim refugees living on the outskirts of Beijing. In particular, 34 Ahmadi Muslim refugees were residing in Yanjiao, east of Beijing; whilst in Langfang, south of the capital, there were about 20 Ahmadi Muslim refugees. The Ahmadis constituted the largest share of all refugees in North China.

In April 2012, the head of the Ahmadiyya movement of Israel, Muhammad Sharif Odeh visited Yinchuan, the provincial capital of Ningxia. Odeh held a meeting with Li Rui, the vice chairman of the autonomous province, taking the opportunity to introduce the peaceful and humanitarian activities of the Ahmadiyya movement around the world. He led a delegation to participate at the China-Arab Economic Trade Forum held in September of the same year. Ningxia is one of the two Chinese provinces with a large proportion of the population following the Islamic faith. Approximately 33% are estimated to be Muslim in the province, while almost 60% are estimated to follow the religion in Xinjiang.

== See also ==
- Islam in China
