= Chenfu =

Chenfu Town 陈府镇
- Town
- Location in Hebei
- Coordinates: 39°51′29″N 117°01′42″E
- Country: China
- Province: Hebei
- Prefecture-level city: Langfang
- Autonomous county: Dachang Hui Autonomous County
- Villages of China: 21 villages

Area
  - Total: 23.76 km^{2} (9.17 sq mi)
- Elevation: 17 m (56 ft)

Population (2018)
  - Total: 12,569
  - Density: 529.0/km^{2} (1,370/sq mi)
- Time zone: UTC+8 (China Standard)
- Area code: 0316

Chenfu (simplified Chinese: 陈府镇; traditional Chinese: 陳府鎮; pinyin: Chénfǔ Zhèn) is a town of Dachang Hui Autonomous County in the centre of the Sanhe exclave of Hebei province, China. Chenfu is situated less than 5 kilometres (3.1 mi) southeast of the county seat. The town spans an area of 23.76 square kilometres (9.17 mi^{2}), and has a hukou population of 12,569 as of 2018.

== Administrative divisions ==
As of 2020, Chenfu has 21 administrative villages under its administration.

== See also ==
- List of township-level divisions of Hebei
