= Shaofu (disambiguation) =

Shaofu may refer to:

- Shaofu town (邵府镇), in Hebei, China
- Shaofu (imperial China) (少府), a Han dynasty official position
