= G0121 Beijing–Qinhuangdao Expressway =

Expressway in Beijing, Hebei and Tianjin of China

Beijing–Qinhuangdao Expressway
- 北京－秦皇岛高速公路
- Jingqin Expressway 京秦高速
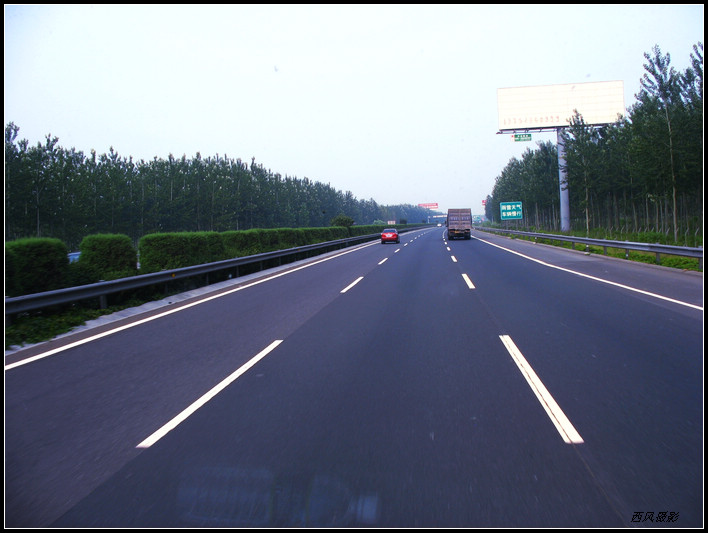
- Jingqin Expressway in Tangshan

Route information
- Auxiliary route of G1

Major junctions
- West end: Beijing
- East end: Qinhuangdao

Location
- Country: China

Highway system
- National Trunk Highway System; Primary; Auxiliary; National Highways; Transport in China
← G0112	→ G0122

The Beijing–Qinhuangdao Expressway (simplified Chinese: 北京－秦皇岛高速公路; traditional Chinese: 北京－秦皇島高速公路), designated as G0121 (formerly G1N) and commonly abbreviated as Jingqin Expressway (Chinese: 京秦高速), is an expressway in northeastern China linking the cities of Beijing and Qinhuangdao. This expressway is a branch of G1 Jingha Expressway.

== Detailed Itinerary ==
From East to West
Under Construction
G1 Jingha Expressway
S52 Chengqin ExprGessway
Qian'an Expressway
S23 Expressway
Under Construction
G25 Changshen Expressway
S264 Road; Dongxinzhuang
S9961 Qingdongling Branch Line
Under Construction
Hebei Province; Tianjin City
Under Construction
Towards G102 Road; Bieshan
S21 Tangcheng Expressway
S101 Road; Jixian
S1 Jinji Expressway
G102 Road; Baijian
S210 Road; Baijian
Service Area
Tianjin City; Hebei Province
Toll Station
G95 Capital Ring Expressway
Service Area
S204 Road; Sanhe Outer Ring Road; Sanhe
Qixinzhuang
Gaolou-Yanjiao
Yanjiao
Under Construction
Yanshun Road; Yanjiao
Hebei Province; Beijing City
G45-East G4501 6th Ring Road
2nd Capital Airport Expressway
Under Construction
From West to East
