= Koudong =

Town in Baodi District, Tianjin, China

Koudong Town 口东镇
- Town
- Location in Tianjin Koudong Town (China)
- Coordinates: 39°40′43″N 117°22′14″E
- Country: China
- Municipality: Tianjin
- District: Baodi
- Village-level Divisions: 31 villages

Area
  - Total: 65.85 km^{2} (25.42 sq mi)
- Elevation: 6 m (20 ft)

Population (2020)
  - Total: 24,397
  - Density: 370.5/km^{2} (959.6/sq mi)
- Time zone: UTC+8 (CST)
- Postal code: 301822
- Area code: 022

Koudong Town (simplified Chinese: 口东镇; traditional Chinese: 口東鎮; pinyin: Kǒudōng Zhèn) is a town located on the north side of Baodi District, Tianjin, China. It shares border with Fangjiazhuang Town to the north, Wangbozhuang and Lintingkou Town to the east, Zhouliang Subdistrict to the south, as well as Yuhua Subdistrict and Haogezhuang Town to the west. It had a population of 24,397 in 2020.

== Geography ==
Koudong Town is situated on the eastern shore of Chaobaixin River, with Jinji Expressway running through the north of the town. The town has an altitude of 6 meters above the sea level.

== History ==
Chronology of Koudong Town
Year	Status	Belong to
1950	Part of 8th District	Baodi County, Hebei
1953	Koudong Township	Baodi County, Hebei
1958	Part of Wangbozhuang People's Commune	Baodi County, Hebei
1961	Koudong People's Commune	Baodi County, Hebei
1973	Koudong People's Commune	Baodi County, Tianjin
1983	Koudong Township	Baodi County, Tianjin
2001	Koudong Town	Baodi District, Tianjin
2013	Koudong Subdistrict	Baodi District, Tianjin
2019	Koudong Town	Baodi District, Tianjin

== Administrative divisions ==
In the year 2022, Koudong Town was subdivided into 31 villages, all of which are listed below:

- Koudong (口东)
- Xiao Zhanggezhuang (小张各庄)
- Nan Wangjiazhuang (南王家庄)
- Liangjia Hutong (梁家胡同)
- Qian QIgezhuang (前齐各庄)
- Dong Qigezhuang (东齐各庄)
- Xi Qigezhuang (西齐各庄)
- Da Zhanggezhuang (大张各庄)
- Dajiangzhuang (大坚庄)
- Shigezhuang (石各庄)
- Huangxinzhuag (黄辛庄)
- Anlezhuang (安乐庄)
- Dong Ligezhuang (东李各庄)
- Xi Ligezhuang (西李各庄)
- Hugezhuang (胡各庄)
- Zhengniutun (张牛屯)
- Dongxinzhuang (东辛庄)
- Xixinzhuang (西辛庄)
- Shang Wanggezhuang (上王各庄)
- Heilangkou (黑狼口)
- Yuguzhuang (于古庄)
- Fuwangzhuang (富王庄)
- Xizhuang (西庄)
- Dongzhuang (东庄)
- Bataigang (八台港)
- Zousihou (邹寺后)
- Liutai (刘台)
- Xinzhai (新寨)
- Xihekou (西河口)
- Laozhuangzi (老庄子)
- Luwenzhuang (鲁文庄)

== See also ==
- List of township-level divisions of Tianjin
