= Baoping Subdistrict, Tianjin =

Subdistrict in Baodi District, Tianjin, China

Baoping Subdistrict 宝平街道
- Subdistrict
- Location in Tianjin Baoping Subdistrict (China)
- Coordinates: 39°43′02″N 117°18′20″E
- Country: China
- Municipality: Tianjin
- District: Baodi
- Village-level Divisions: 24 residential communities 13 villages

Area
  - Total: 21.48 km^{2} (8.29 sq mi)
- Elevation: 7 m (23 ft)

Population (2010)
  - Total: 97,164
  - Density: 4,523/km^{2} (11,720/sq mi)
- Time zone: UTC+8 (CST)
- Postal code: 301899
- Area code: 022

Baoping Subdistrict (simplified Chinese: 宝平街道; traditional Chinese: 寶平街道; pinyin: Bǎopíng Jiēdào) is a subdistrict situated in northern Baodi District, Tianjin, China. It borders Zhaoxia and Haibin Subdistricts to the north, Yuhua Subdistrict to the east, Chaoyang Subdistrict to the south, and Shigezhuang Town to the west. There were 97,164 people residing in the subdistrict in 2010.

== History ==
Timeline of Baoping Subdistrict
Year	Status	Part of
1953 – 1958	Within Chengguan Township	Baodi County, Hebei
1958 – 1961	Within Chengguan People's Commune	Baodi County, Hebei
1961 – 1973	Within Shiqiao People's Commune	Baodi County, Hebei
1973 – 1982	Within Shiqiao People's Commune	Baodi County, Tianjin
1982 – 1983	Within Chengguan Town	Baodi County, Tianjin
1983 – 2001	Within Chengguan and Shiqiao Townships	Baodi County, Tianjin
2001 – 2006	Within Chengguan Town	Baodi District, Tianjin
2006 – present	Baoping Subdistrict	Baodi District, Tianjin

== Administrative divisions ==
By the end of 2022, Baoping Subdistrict consisted of 33 subdivisions, in which 24 were residential communities and 17 were villages. They are as follows:

=== Residential communities ===
- Huayuan (华苑)
- Xinyuan (新苑)
- Mingchun (鸣春)
- Baoping (宝平)
- Baijian (百间)
- Zhongbaolou (中保楼)
- Jianshelu (建设路)
- Tianchangnan (田场南)
- Yueyuan (岳园)
- Taida (泰达)
- Bei'an (北岸)
- Longxi Dijing (龙熙帝景)
- Meigui (玫瑰)
- Xinyi (馨逸)
- Yicheng (逸城)
- Hejing (河景)
- Bailuwan (白鹭湾)
- Zerun (泽润)
- Baodi Jingdian (宝地经典)
- Yixin Jiayuan (艺馨佳苑)
- Jixiang (吉祥)
- Jiahe (家和)
- Xinxing (新兴)
- Jinwutong (金梧桐)

=== Villages ===
- Nanyuanzhuang (南苑庄)
- Xifangsi (西方寺)
- Yuejiayuan (岳家园)
- Damazhuang (大马庄)
- Liuxinzhuang (刘辛庄)
- Yuzhuangtou (于庄头)
- Qianzhaoxia (前朝霞)
- Shifoying (石佛营)
- Heidouwo (黑豆窝)
- Lujiazhuang (路家庄)
- Xiematai (歇马台)
- Shiqiao (石桥)
- Taipingzhuang (太平庄)

== See also ==
- List of township-level divisions of Tianjin
