= 1679 Sanhe–Pinggu earthquake =

Magnitude 8 earthquake in Northern China

1679 Sanhe-Pinggu earthquake 三河—平谷地震
- Location within China
- Local date: September 2, 1679
- Magnitude: 8.0 M_{w}
- Depth: 19 km (12 mi)
- Epicenter: 40°00′N 116°59′E (Sanhe, Langfang Prefecture, Hebei)
- Areas affected: China
- Max. intensity: MMI X (Extreme)
- Casualties: 45,500 (estimate)

The 1679 Sanhe-Pinggu earthquake (Chinese: 三河—平谷地震; pinyin: Sānhé—Pínggǔ dìzhèn) was a major quake that struck the Zhili (Greater Beijing) region in Qing China on the morning of September 2, 1679. It is the largest recorded surface rupture event to have occurred in the North China Plain. The epicenter was located approximately 50 km (31 mi) east of the Imperial Palace in Beijing.

== Earthquake ==
The earthquake struck sometime between 9 am and 11 am on Saturday, September 2, 1679, and had its epicenter in Sanhe, modern day Hebei Province. It had an estimated magnitude of 8.0 M_{w} and ruptured along most of the Xiadian Fault's length. The strike-slip earthquake was located at a depth of 19 km (12 mi) and was the largest known earthquake to have occurred in the North China Plain.

== Impact ==
The 1679 earthquake was most devastating for the towns of Sanhe and Pinggu, east of Beijing. In these two towns, intensity is estimated to have reached X (extreme) while in Beijing the intensity reached VIII (severe). Sanhe was virtually destroyed while in Pinggu only between 30 and 40% households survived. Many buildings and structures in Beijing were also damaged or destroyed. The Qing dynasty White Pagoda in Beihai Park and Desheng Gate were both destroyed. The Kangxi Emperor survived the quake, but many officials and citizens in Beijing were killed. While the total number of fatalities is unknown, it is estimated that upwards of 45,500 were killed by the quake.

The earthquake was felt as far west as Gansu Province and as far northeast as Liaoning Province.

== Future threat ==
While the Xiadian Fault is still active and poses a potential threat to the Greater Beijing region, earthquakes of this magnitude are predicted to occur only every 6,500 years along the slow moving fault. Other similar faults, however, exist in the Beijing region and are not properly understood. On average, a major earthquake is predicted to occur in the North China Plain every 300 years, most recently with the 1976 Tangshan earthquake. A 2007 study by Risk Management Solutions found that an earthquake similar in size to the 1679 Sanhe-Pinggu event could have devastating effects and result in the deaths of between 35,000 and 75,000 people. In addition, economic impacts at that time were estimated to be 445 billion RMB (c. $57 billion).
