= Dachang Hui Autonomous County =

Dachang County 大厂县 · دَاچْا
- Autonomous county
- 大厂回族自治县 · دَاچْا خُوِذُو ذِجِشِیًا Dachang Hui Autonomous County
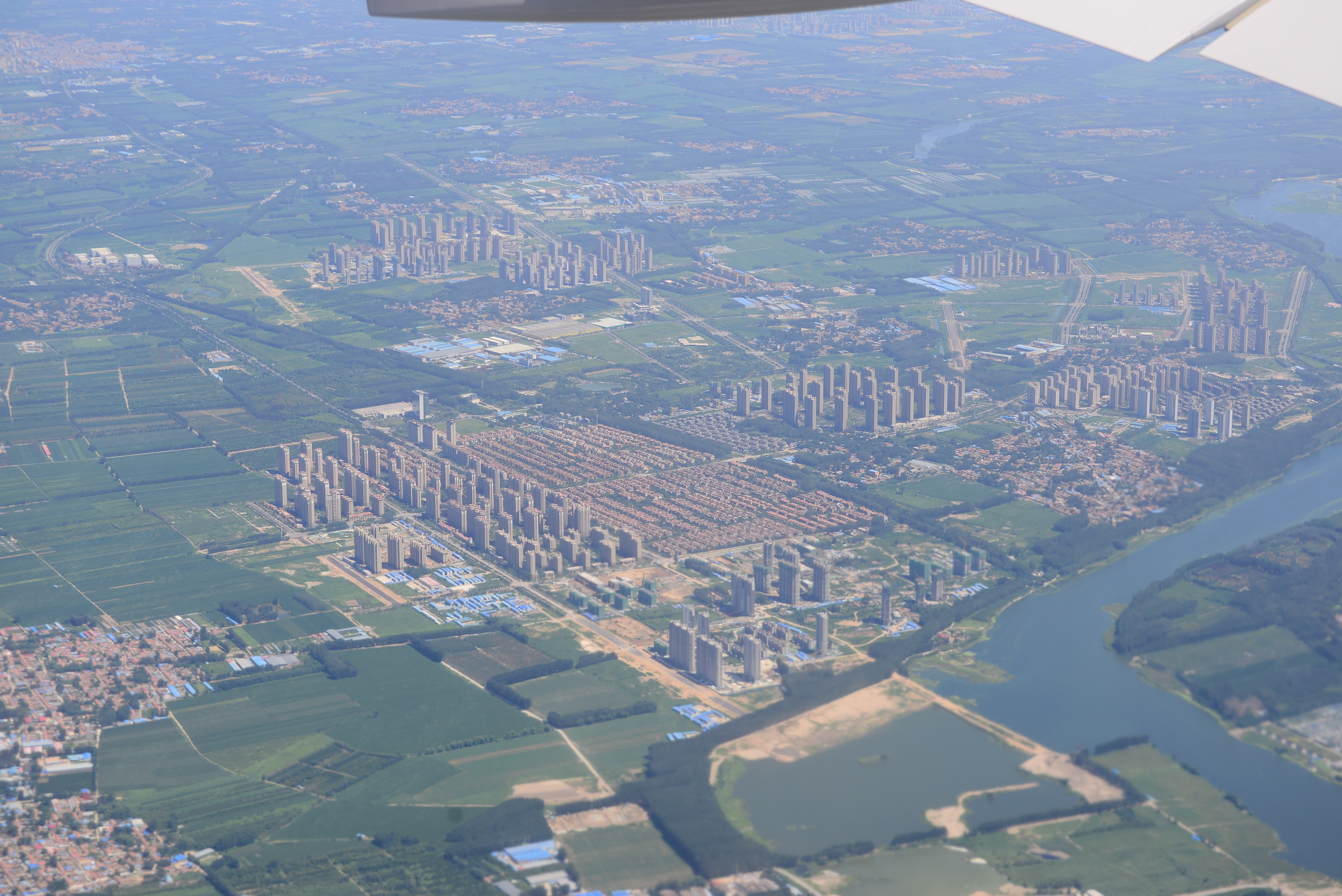

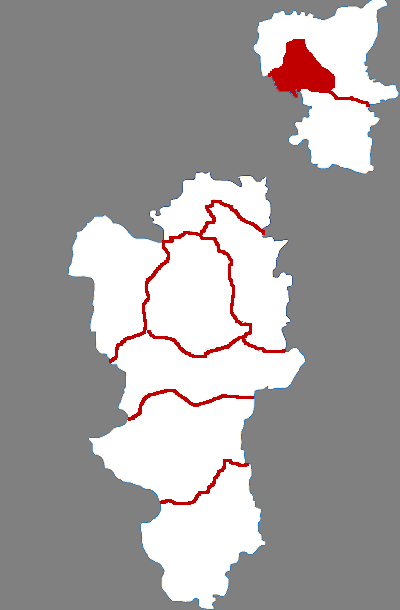
- Dachang in Langfang

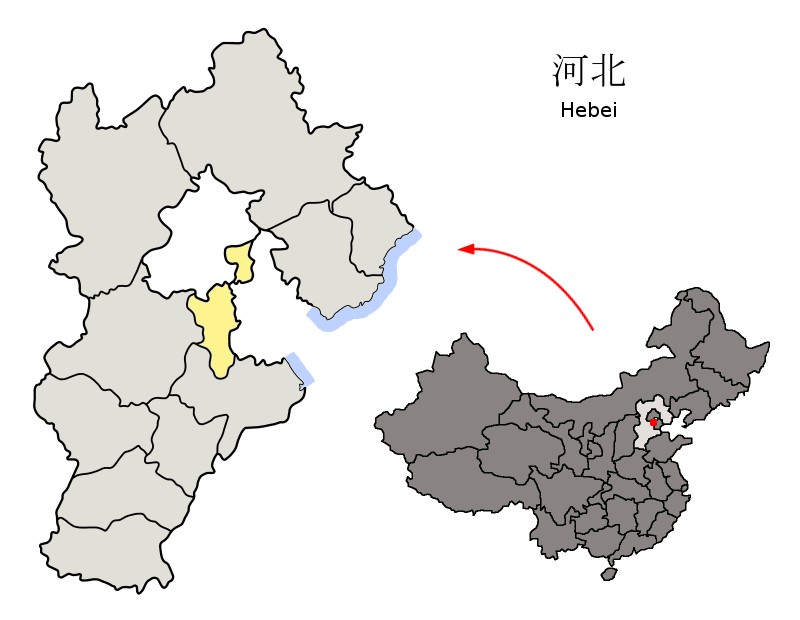
- Langfang in Hebei
- Coordinates: 39°53′11″N 116°59′23″E
- Country: People's Republic of China
- Province: Hebei
- Prefecture-level city: Langfang
- County seat: Dachang Town (大厂镇)

Area
  - Autonomous county: 176 km^{2} (68 sq mi)
- Elevation: 20 m (66 ft)

Population (2020 census)
  - Autonomous county: 171,366
  - Density: 974/km^{2} (2,520/sq mi)
  - Urban: 109,011 (64%)
  - Rural: 62,355 (36%)
- Time zone: UTC+8 (China Standard)
- Postal code: 065300
- Area code: 0316
- Website: http://www.lfdc.gov.cn/

Dachang Hui Autonomous County (simplified Chinese: 大厂回族自治县; traditional Chinese: 大廠回族自治縣; pinyin: Dàchǎng Huízú Zìzhìxiàn; Xiao'erjing: دَاچْا خُوِذُو ذِجِشِیًا) is a Hui autonomous county of Hebei province. It is under the administration of Langfang prefecture-level city, and was established in 1955. The Hui Muslim county of Dachang was subjected to slaughter by the Japanese in the Second Sino-Japanese War.

Together with Sanhe City, and Xianghe County, it forms the Northern three counties, an exclave of Hebei province surrounded by the municipalities of Beijing and Tianjin, and itself borders Beijing to the west.

A Dachang Hui Imam, Ma Zhenwu, wrote a Qur'an translation into Chinese including Chinese characters and Xiao'erjing.

The county spans an area of 176 square kilometres (68 mi^{2}), and has a population of about 171,366 people as of 2020.

== Administrative divisions ==
The county administers one subdistrict and five towns. The county also administers the Hebei Dachang High-tech Industrial Development Zone, which serves as a township-level division. These township-level divisions then administer 16 residential communities, and 105 administrative villages.

Dachang's sole subdistrict is Beichen Subdistrict.

Dachang's five towns are Dachang, Xiadian, Qigezhuang, Shaofu, and Chenfu.

== Geography ==
The county is bounded by the Chaobai River, across from which is Tongzhou District in Beijing.

Dachang's county center lies 42 kilometres (26 mi) from Tiananmen Square, and 107 kilometres (66 mi) from the center of Tianjin.

34.2% of the county is forested.

== Climate ==
Climate data for Dachang, elevation 18 m (59 ft), (1991–2020 normals, extremes 1981–2025)
Month	Jan	Feb	Mar	Apr	May	Jun	Jul	Aug	Sep	Oct	Nov	Dec	Year
Record high °C (°F)	13.9 (57.0)	16.1 (61.0)	29.4 (84.9)	31.3 (88.3)	37.8 (100.0)	39.6 (103.3)	40.6 (105.1)	36.2 (97.2)	34.8 (94.6)	30.1 (86.2)	21.3 (70.3)	13.5 (56.3)	40.6 (105.1)
Mean daily maximum °C (°F)	1.8 (35.2)	5.7 (42.3)	12.8 (55.0)	20.6 (69.1)	26.7 (80.1)	30.4 (86.7)	31.5 (88.7)	30.4 (86.7)	26.2 (79.2)	19.1 (66.4)	9.9 (49.8)	3.1 (37.6)	18.2 (64.7)
Daily mean °C (°F)	−4.2 (24.4)	−0.7 (30.7)	6.3 (43.3)	14.1 (57.4)	20.2 (68.4)	24.4 (75.9)	26.5 (79.7)	25.1 (77.2)	19.8 (67.6)	12.5 (54.5)	3.9 (39.0)	−2.5 (27.5)	12.1 (53.8)
Mean daily minimum °C (°F)	−9.0 (15.8)	−6.0 (21.2)	0.3 (32.5)	7.6 (45.7)	13.4 (56.1)	18.7 (65.7)	22.1 (71.8)	20.8 (69.4)	14.7 (58.5)	7.1 (44.8)	−0.9 (30.4)	−6.9 (19.6)	6.8 (44.3)
Record low °C (°F)	−22.3 (−8.1)	−16.6 (2.1)	−11.5 (11.3)	−2.1 (28.2)	4.7 (40.5)	11.6 (52.9)	15.5 (59.9)	11.9 (53.4)	3.4 (38.1)	−3.8 (25.2)	−8.6 (16.5)	−17.7 (0.1)	−22.3 (−8.1)
Average precipitation mm (inches)	2.7 (0.11)	4.7 (0.19)	7.8 (0.31)	21.9 (0.86)	40.4 (1.59)	76.4 (3.01)	175.1 (6.89)	119.6 (4.71)	54.4 (2.14)	30.6 (1.20)	14.7 (0.58)	2.5 (0.10)	550.8 (21.69)
Average precipitation days (≥ 0.1 mm)	1.6	2.1	2.9	4.2	6.0	9.5	12.1	9.2	6.8	4.7	3.1	1.5	63.7
Average snowy days	2.4	2.1	0.9	0.1	0	0	0	0	0	0	1.6	2.5	9.6
Average relative humidity (%)	47	47	45	48	55	64	76	79	75	68	61	52	60
Mean monthly sunshine hours	182.8	185.4	230.1	240.6	269.2	222.7	185.6	207.7	210.9	198.7	165.9	172.6	2,472.2
Percentage possible sunshine	61	61	62	60	60	50	41	49	57	58	56	60	56
Source: China Meteorological Administration

== Demographics ==
As of 2019, Dachang is home to about 27,400 Hui people, comprising approximately 20.45% of the county's population.

== Economy ==
As of 2019, Dachang's gross domestic product totaled ¥16.48 billion. The county's urban residents have an annual per capita disposable income of ¥45,044, and the county's rural residents have an annual per capita disposable income of ¥18,418.

== Transportation ==
A number of expressways pass through the county, including the Jingping Expressway, the Jingqin Expressway, the Beijing–Harbin Expressway, and the G95 Capital Area Loop Expressway.

Five passenger bus lines link Dachang to Beijing.

The Beijing–Tangshan intercity railway is planned to run through the county, but is still under construction as of 2021.
