= G0122 Qinhuangdao–Shenyang Expressway =

Road in China

Qinhuangdao–Shenyang Expressway
- 秦皇岛－沈阳高速公路
- Qinshen Expressway 秦沈高速公路

Route information
- Auxiliary route of G1

Major junctions
- West end: Beidaihe District, Qinhuangdao, Hebei
- East end: Shenyang, Liaoning

Location
- Country: China

Highway system
- National Trunk Highway System; Primary; Auxiliary; National Highways; Transport in China
← G0121	→ G2

The G0122 Qinhuangdao–Shenyang Expressway (Chinese: 秦皇岛—沈阳高速公路), also referred to as the Qinshen Expressway (Chinese: 秦沈高速公路), is an under construction expressway in China that connects Qinhuangdao, Hebei to Shenyang, Liaoning.

== Route ==
The expressway will start in Beidaihe District, Qinhuangdao, then continue through Changli County, Jianchang County, Beizhen, Yi County and Heishan County, before terminating in Shenyang.
