= Antoutun =

Antoutun 安头屯镇
- Town
- Āntóutún Zhèn
- Location in Hebei Location in China
- Coordinates: 39°42′54″N 117°05′07″E
- Country: People's Republic of China
- Province: Hebei
- Prefecture-level city: Langfang
- County: Xianghe

Area
  - Total: 43.57 km^{2} (16.82 sq mi)

Population (2010)
  - Total: 25,401
  - Density: 583/km^{2} (1,510/sq mi)
- Time zone: UTC+8 (China Standard)

Antoutun (Chinese: 安头屯镇; pinyin: Āntóutún Zhèn) is a town located in Xianghe County, Langfang, Hebei, China. According to the 2010 census, Antoutun had a population of 25,401, including 13,051 males and 12,350 females. The population was distributed as follows: 2,963 people aged under 14, 19,715 people aged between 15 and 64, and 2,723 people aged over 65.

== See also ==
- List of township-level divisions of Hebei
