= Duanjialing =

Duanjialing 段甲岭镇
- Town
- Duànjiălĭng Zhèn
- Location in Hebei Location in China
- Coordinates: 39°59′15″N 117°09′39″E
- Country: People's Republic of China
- Province: Hebei
- Prefecture-level city: Langfang
- County-level city: Sanhe

Area
  - Total: 55.60 km^{2} (21.47 sq mi)

Population (2010)
  - Total: 18,872
  - Density: 339.4/km^{2} (879/sq mi)
- Time zone: UTC+8 (China Standard)

Duanjialing (Chinese: 段甲岭镇; pinyin: Duànjiălĭng Zhèn) is a town located in Sanhe, Langfang, Hebei, China. According to the 2010 census, Duanjialing had a population of 18,872, including 9,740 males and 9,132 females. The population was distributed as follows: 2,769 people aged under 14, 13,998 people aged between 15 and 64, and 2,105 people aged over 65.

== See also ==
- List of township-level divisions of Hebei
