= Baodi, Tianjin =

Coordinates: 39°43′02″N 117°18′36″E

Baodi 宝坻区 Paoti
- District
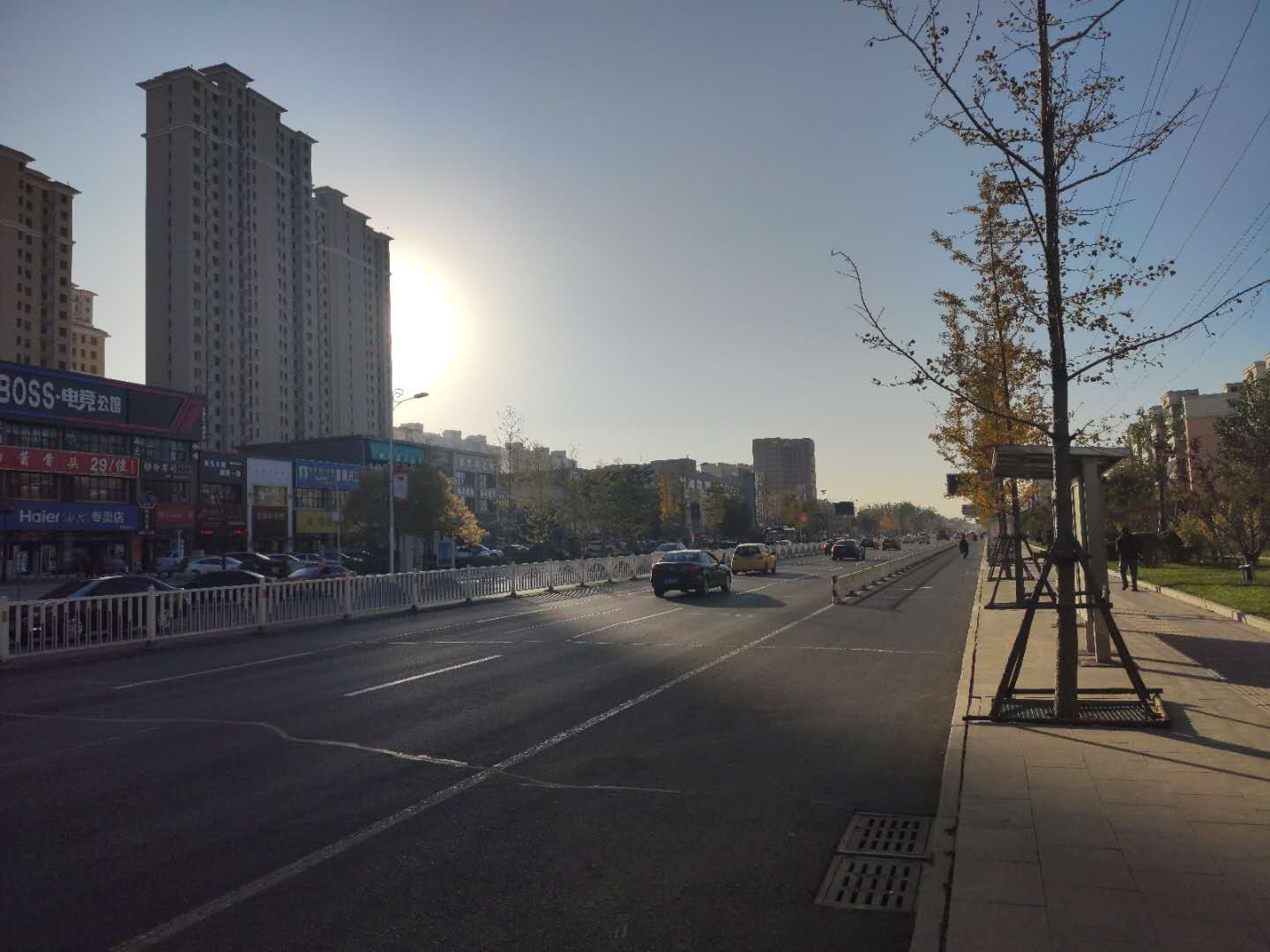
- Interactive map of Baodi
- Country: People's Republic of China
- Municipality: Tianjin
- Township-level divisions: 6 subdistricts 18 towns

Population (2017)
  - Total: 926,700
- Time zone: UTC+8 (China Standard)
- GDP: CNY 63.817 billion(2018)
Tianjin district map
Subdivisions of Tianjin
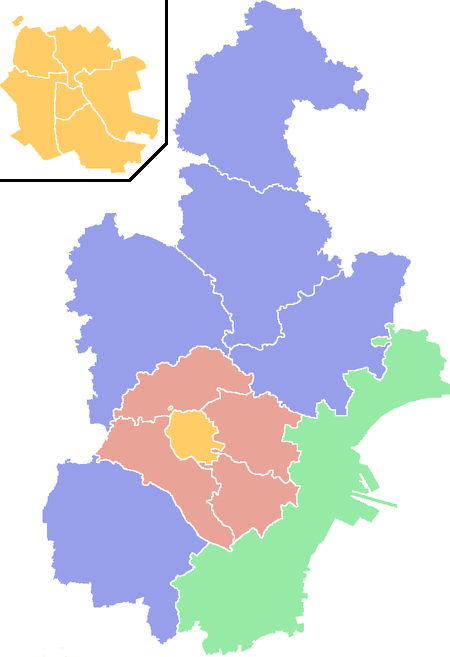
Core districts See inset
1	Heping
2	Hedong
3	Hexi
4	Nankai
5	Hebei
6	Hongqiao
Suburbs
7	Dongli
8	Xiqing
9	Jinnan
10	Beichen
Binhai and Rural
13	Binhai	14	Ninghe
11	Wuqing	15	Jinghai
12	Baodi	16	Ji Zhou
- Website: http://www.tjbd.gov.cn/

Baodi District (simplified Chinese: 宝坻区; traditional Chinese: 寶坻區; pinyin: Bǎodí Qū) is a district of the municipality of Tianjin, People's Republic of China.

== Transport ==
=== Rail ===
==== Station ====
- Baodi
- Baodi North
- Baodi South
- Dakoutun

==== Railway ====
- Tianjin–Jizhou railway
- Beijing–Tangshan intercity railway
- Beijing–Binhai intercity railway
- Tianjin-Chengde Intercity Railway

=== Roads and Expressways ===
The following three expressways of China run in or through Baodi:

- Beijing–Harbin Expressway
- Jinji Expressway
- Tangcheng Expressway

The following two China National Highways pass through Tianjin:

- China National Highway 233
- China National Highway 509

== Administrative divisions ==
There are 8 subdistricts and 16 towns in the district:

Name	Chinese (S)	Hanyu Pinyin	Population (2010)	Area (km^{2})
Baoping Subdistrict	宝平街道	Bǎopíng Jiēdào	97,164	
Haibin Subdistrict	海滨街道	Hǎibīn Jiēdào	55,821	118
Yuhua Subdistrict	钰华街道	Yùhuá Jiēdào	48,825	
Zhouliang Subdistrict	周良街道	Zhōuliáng Jiēdào	12,144	45
Koudong town	口东镇	Kǒudōng Zhèn	29,181	31
Dabaizhuang town	大白庄镇	Dàbáizhuāng Zhèn	18,139	81.6
Chaoyang Subdistrict	潮阳街道	Cháoyáng Jiēdào	30,090	
Zhaoxia Subdistrict	朝霞街道	Zhāoxiá Jiēdào	39,941	26
Dakoutun town	大口屯镇	Dàkǒu Zhèn	56,526	88.2
Nanrenfu	南仁垺乡	Nánrénfú Xiāng	merged with Dakoutun	
Xinkaikou town	新开口镇	Xīnkāikǒu Zhèn	25,748	36
Haogezhuang town	郝各庄镇	Hǎogè Zhèn	18,752	15
Niudaokou town	牛道口镇	Niúdàokǒu Zhèn	47,168	
Xin'an town	新安镇	Xīn'ān Zhèn	30,783	28
Dazhongzhuang town	大钟庄镇	Dàzhōngzhuāng Zhèn	36,406	100
Wangbozhuang town	王卜庄镇	Wángbozhuāng Zhèn	32,301	39.2
Fangjiazhuang town	方家庄镇	Fāngjiāzhuāng Zhèn	30,338	28
Bamencheng town	八门城镇	Bāménchéng Zhèn	25,325	60
Huogezhuang town	霍各庄镇	Huògèzhuāng Zhèn	26,607	33
Lintingkou town	林亭口镇	Líntíngkǒu Zhèn	31,810	42
Datangzhuang town	大唐庄镇	Dàtángzhuāng Zhèn	13,512	
Shigezhuang town	史各庄镇	Shǐgèzhuāng Zhèn	25,783	34
Huangzhuang town	黄庄镇	Huángzhuāng Zhèn	11,475	112
Erwangzhuang town	尔王庄镇	Ěrwángzhuāng Zhèn	13,120	53
Niujiapai town	牛家牌镇	Niújiāpái Zhèn	16,755	52
industrial & farming zones			25,443	

== Climate ==
Climate data for Baodi District, elevation 5 m (16 ft), (1991–2020 normals, extremes 1981–2010)
Month	Jan	Feb	Mar	Apr	May	Jun	Jul	Aug	Sep	Oct	Nov	Dec	Year
Record high °C (°F)	13.8 (56.8)	20.0 (68.0)	29.0 (84.2)	32.3 (90.1)	38.0 (100.4)	39.1 (102.4)	40.8 (105.4)	36.4 (97.5)	35.8 (96.4)	30.1 (86.2)	20.9 (69.6)	13.9 (57.0)	40.8 (105.4)
Mean daily maximum °C (°F)	1.8 (35.2)	5.7 (42.3)	12.8 (55.0)	20.6 (69.1)	26.6 (79.9)	30.3 (86.5)	31.4 (88.5)	30.4 (86.7)	26.3 (79.3)	19.2 (66.6)	9.9 (49.8)	3.1 (37.6)	18.2 (64.7)
Daily mean °C (°F)	−4.4 (24.1)	−0.8 (30.6)	6.2 (43.2)	14.1 (57.4)	20.1 (68.2)	24.3 (75.7)	26.5 (79.7)	25.2 (77.4)	20.1 (68.2)	12.6 (54.7)	3.9 (39.0)	−2.5 (27.5)	12.1 (53.8)
Mean daily minimum °C (°F)	−9.2 (15.4)	−6.2 (20.8)	0.1 (32.2)	7.6 (45.7)	13.5 (56.3)	18.7 (65.7)	22.2 (72.0)	20.9 (69.6)	14.8 (58.6)	7.0 (44.6)	−1.0 (30.2)	−7.0 (19.4)	6.8 (44.2)
Record low °C (°F)	−23.3 (−9.9)	−18.6 (−1.5)	−11.5 (11.3)	−2.7 (27.1)	3.9 (39.0)	9.4 (48.9)	15.3 (59.5)	11.3 (52.3)	4.2 (39.6)	−5.5 (22.1)	−11.8 (10.8)	−18.6 (−1.5)	−23.3 (−9.9)
Average precipitation mm (inches)	2.4 (0.09)	4.2 (0.17)	6.6 (0.26)	19.4 (0.76)	35.4 (1.39)	75.9 (2.99)	173.1 (6.81)	123.3 (4.85)	53.5 (2.11)	31.2 (1.23)	14.6 (0.57)	2.7 (0.11)	542.3 (21.34)
Average precipitation days (≥ 0.1 mm)	1.2	1.9	2.6	4.4	5.6	9.6	11.3	9.1	6.5	4.6	3.0	1.6	61.4
Average snowy days	2.3	2.2	0.9	0.1	0	0	0	0	0	0	1.6	2.8	9.9
Average relative humidity (%)	50	49	47	49	55	64	76	79	74	68	62	55	61
Mean monthly sunshine hours	178.7	181.7	225.8	236.2	258.9	218.5	188.3	205.1	207.7	197.7	165.3	172.0	2,435.9
Percentage possible sunshine	59	60	61	59	58	49	42	49	56	58	56	59	56
Source: China Meteorological Administration
