= Xianghe County =

Xianghe County 香河县 Siangho
- County
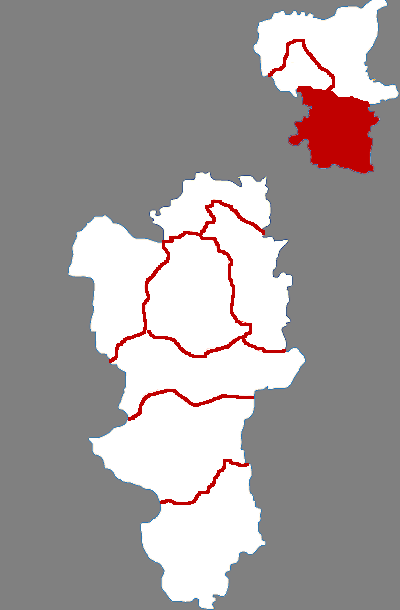
- Xianghe in Langfang

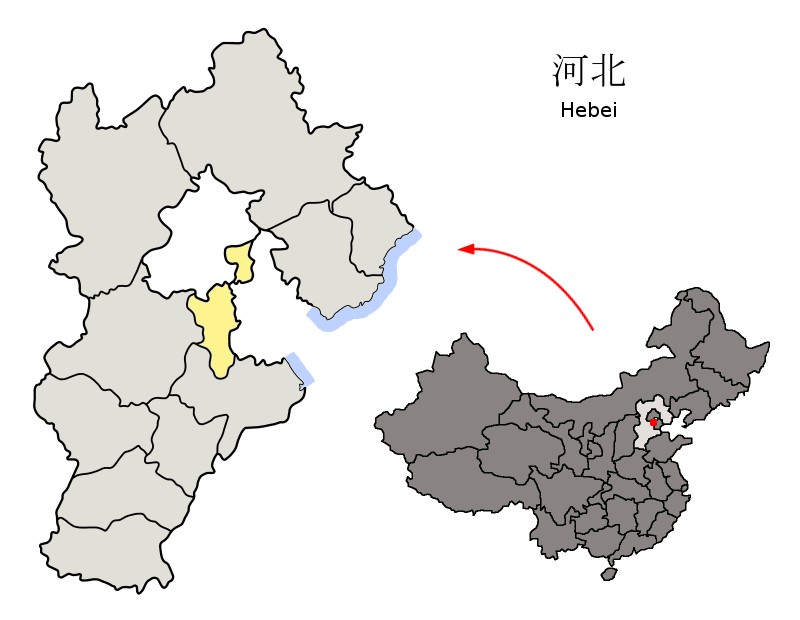
- Langfang in Hebei
- Coordinates: 39°45′40″N 117°00′22″E
- Country: People's Republic of China
- Province: Hebei
- Prefecture-level city: Langfang
- Seat: Shuyang Town (淑阳镇)

Area
  - County: 458 km^{2} (177 sq mi)

Population (2020 census)
  - County: 449,038
  - Density: 980/km^{2} (2,540/sq mi)
  - Urban: 330,665 (74%)
  - Rural: 118,373 (26%)
- Time zone: UTC+8 (China Standard)
- Postal code: 065400
- Area code: 0316
- Website: www.xianghe.gov.cn

Xianghe County (simplified Chinese: 香河县; traditional Chinese: 香河縣; pinyin: Xiānghé Xiàn) is a county of central Hebei province with 449,038 inhabitants in 2020, up from 343,372 inhabitants in 2010. It is under the administration of Langfang prefecture-level city. Xianghe has 7 towns and 2 townships. It is 45 kilometres (28 mi) southeast of Beijing.

Sanhe city, Dachang Hui Autonomous County and Xianghe County form the "Northern Three Counties of Langfang", an exclave of Hebei province surrounded by the municipalities of Beijing and Tianjin.

== Administrative divisions ==
Towns:

- Shuyang (淑阳镇), Jiangxintun (蒋辛屯镇), Qukou (渠口镇), Antoutun (安头屯镇), Anping (安平镇), Liusong (刘宋镇), Wubaihu (五百户镇)

Townships:

- Qianwang Township (钱旺乡), Qiantun Township (钳屯乡)

== Climate ==
Climate data for Xianghe, elevation 9 m (30 ft), (1991–2020 normals, extremes 1981–2010)
Month	Jan	Feb	Mar	Apr	May	Jun	Jul	Aug	Sep	Oct	Nov	Dec	Year
Record high °C (°F)	13.9 (57.0)	19.9 (67.8)	29.4 (84.9)	32.0 (89.6)	38.2 (100.8)	39.2 (102.6)	40.7 (105.3)	36.6 (97.9)	34.6 (94.3)	30.8 (87.4)	21.6 (70.9)	13.6 (56.5)	40.7 (105.3)
Mean daily maximum °C (°F)	2.0 (35.6)	5.9 (42.6)	13.0 (55.4)	20.9 (69.6)	27.0 (80.6)	30.8 (87.4)	31.9 (89.4)	30.8 (87.4)	26.7 (80.1)	19.4 (66.9)	10.2 (50.4)	3.3 (37.9)	18.5 (65.3)
Daily mean °C (°F)	−3.7 (25.3)	−0.3 (31.5)	6.6 (43.9)	14.5 (58.1)	20.6 (69.1)	24.8 (76.6)	26.9 (80.4)	25.7 (78.3)	20.6 (69.1)	13.1 (55.6)	4.5 (40.1)	−1.9 (28.6)	12.6 (54.7)
Mean daily minimum °C (°F)	−8.1 (17.4)	−5.0 (23.0)	1.2 (34.2)	8.5 (47.3)	14.5 (58.1)	19.5 (67.1)	22.8 (73.0)	21.7 (71.1)	15.9 (60.6)	8.2 (46.8)	0.1 (32.2)	−5.9 (21.4)	7.8 (46.0)
Record low °C (°F)	−21.2 (−6.2)	−18.1 (−0.6)	−12.2 (10.0)	−2.6 (27.3)	3.1 (37.6)	9.4 (48.9)	15.5 (59.9)	13.5 (56.3)	3.9 (39.0)	−5.1 (22.8)	−11.2 (11.8)	−20.8 (−5.4)	−21.2 (−6.2)
Average precipitation mm (inches)	2.9 (0.11)	5.3 (0.21)	7.5 (0.30)	21.4 (0.84)	40.4 (1.59)	77.0 (3.03)	163.6 (6.44)	114.1 (4.49)	49.4 (1.94)	29.4 (1.16)	15.3 (0.60)	2.6 (0.10)	528.9 (20.81)
Average precipitation days (≥ 0.1 mm)	1.6	2.2	2.7	4.6	6.6	9.8	11.8	9.7	6.3	4.7	3.0	1.7	64.7
Average snowy days	2.4	2.0	0.9	0.1	0	0	0	0	0	0	1.4	2.6	9.4
Average relative humidity (%)	50	49	47	49	55	64	74	77	72	66	61	54	60
Mean monthly sunshine hours	175.7	179.1	228.2	240.2	267.1	231.7	203.8	216.2	213.4	200.9	163.8	161.7	2,481.8
Percentage possible sunshine	58	59	61	60	60	52	45	51	58	59	55	56	56
Source: China Meteorological Administration

== Grand Epoch City ==
The "Grand Epoch City" located in the Xianghe Economic & Technical Development Zone of Hebei Province is a 1/6th scale model of the old walled city of Beijing. It covers an area of 200 hectares (490 acres) and contains temples, fountains, ponds, a 27-hole golf course among other things and has hundred of thousands of replicas; all within the "city's" walls.

Its total area covers 2,660,000 square metres (29,000,000 sq ft) with 470,000 square metres (5,100,000 sq ft) of building floor space. The city was built with a total investment of RMB 3 billion (approx. $481.3 million USD).
