= Yuhua Subdistrict, Tianjin =

Subdistrict in Baodi District, Tianjin, China

Yuhua Subdistrict 钰华街道
- Subdistrict
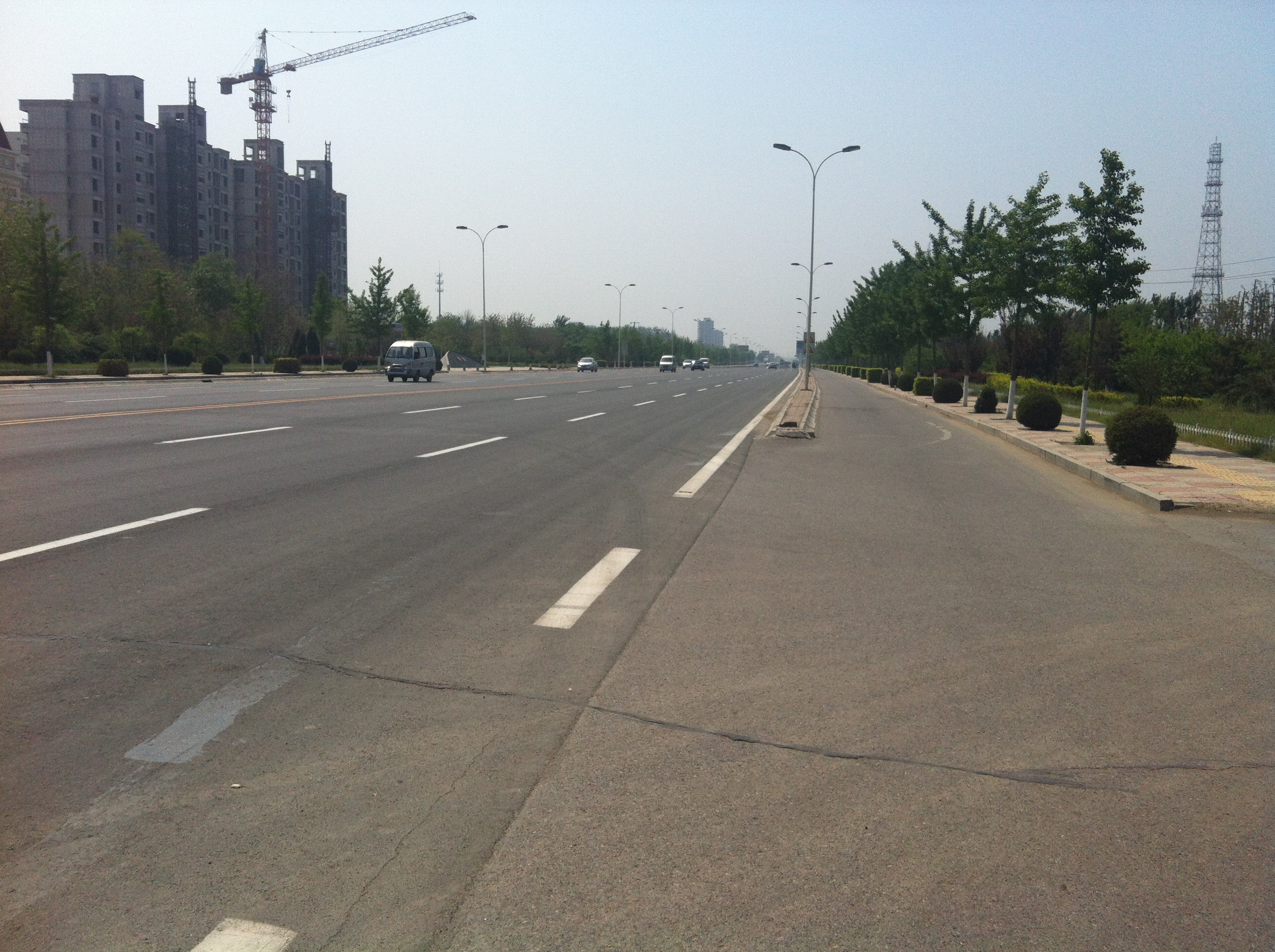
- Laojuntang Village within Yuhua Subdistrict

- Location in Tianjin Yuhua Subdistrict (China)
- Coordinates: 39°41′57″N 117°18′33″E
- Country: China
- Municipality: Tianjin
- District: Baodi
- Village-level Divisions: 8 residential communities 30 villages

Area
  - Total: 22.48 km^{2} (8.68 sq mi)
- Elevation: 7 m (23 ft)

Population (2010)
  - Total: 48,825
  - Density: 2,172/km^{2} (5,625/sq mi)
- Time zone: UTC+8 (CST)
- Postal code: 301899
- Area code: 022

Yuhua Subdistrict (simplified Chinese: 钰华街道; traditional Chinese: 鈺華街道; pinyin: Yùhuá Jiēdào) is a subdistrict located in the north of Baodi District, Tianjin, China. It shares border with Haibin Subdistrict and Huogezhuang Town in its north, Fangjiazhuang and Koudong Towns in its east, Chaoyang Subdistrict and Haogezhuang Town in its south, and Baoping Subdistrict in its west. As of 2010, its population was 48,825.

== History ==
Timetable of Yuhua Subdistrict
Year	Status	Part of
1953 – 1958	Within Chengguan Township	Baodi County, Hebei
1958 – 1961	Within Chengguan People's commune	Baodi County, Hebei
1961 – 1973	Within Shiqiao People's Commune	Baodi County, Hebei
1973 – 1982	Within Shiqiao People's Commune	Baodi County, Tianjin
1982 – 1983	Within Chengguan Town	Baodi County, Tianjin
1983 – 2001	Within Chengguan and Shiqiao Townships	Baodi County, Tianjin
2001 – 2006	Within Chengguan Town	Baodi District, Tianjin
2006 – present	Yuhua Subdistrict	Baodi District, Tianjin

== Administrative divisions ==
As of 2022, Yuhua subdistrict was made up of 38 subdivisions, including the following 8 residential communities and 30 villages:

=== Residential communities ===
- Yuhuajie (钰华街)
- Dizhilu (地质路)
- Shunchi (顺驰)
- Yuanzhu Xiaoqu (原筑小区)
- Lüjing Jiayuan (绿景家园)
- Yuhe Jiayuan (裕和家园)
- Lüse Jiayuan (绿色家园)
- Xiyuefeng (玺悦峰)

=== Villages ===
- Qianwulipu (前五里铺)
- Longtan (龙潭)
- Dongyuanzhuang (东苑庄)
- Haozhuang (郝庄)
- Dongdatao (东大套)
- Xidatao (西大套)
- Chenjia'an (陈家庵)
- Dengjiazhuang (邓家庄)
- Wangjiazhuang (王家庄)
- Gongjiazhuang (龚家庄)
- Jiangzhuang (姜庄)
- Nanzhangjiazhuang (南张家庄)
- Xinwutun (辛务屯)
- Anjiaqiao (安家桥)
- Tianguzhuang (田顾庄)
- Laojuntang (老君堂)
- Duangezhuang (段各庄)
- Songshuzhuang (松树庄)
- Qulüzhuang (渠吕庄)
- Loudixia (楼底下)
- Qiangaojiakou (前高家口)
- Zhonggaojiakou (中高家口)
- Hougaojiakou (后高家口)
- Sanlitun (三里屯)
- Wangjia'an (王家庵)
- Guojiazhuang (郭家庄)
- Qianhuaishu (前槐树)
- Yuanjialou (苑家楼)
- Houhuaishu (后槐树)
- Wujiatang (吴家塘)

== See also ==
- List of township-level divisions of Tianjin
