= Yanjiao =

Yanjiao 燕郊镇
- Town
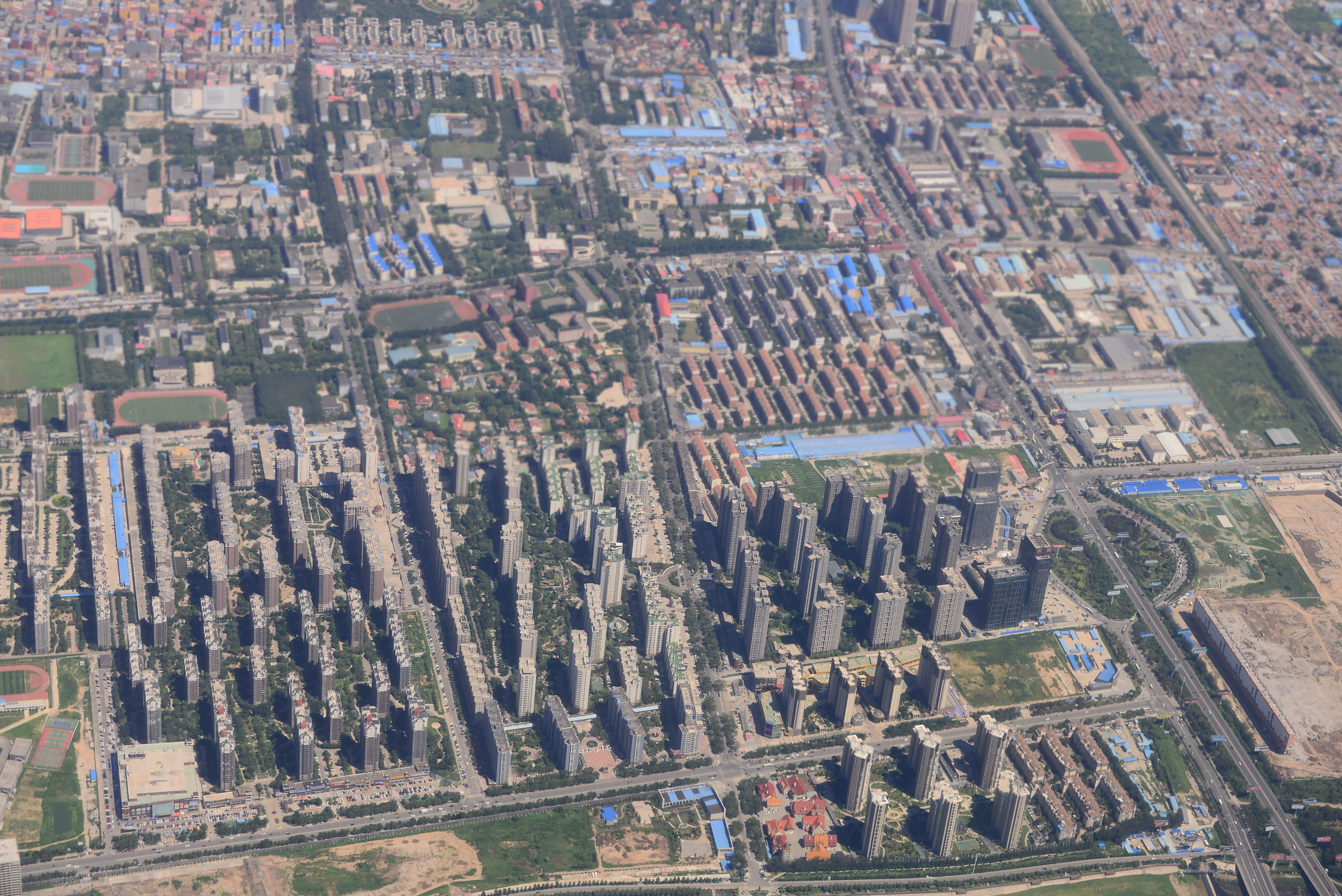
- Aerial view of the western part of Yanjiao

- Location in Hebei
- Coordinates: 39°56′39″N 116°48′35″E
- Country: People's Republic of China
- Province: Hebei
- Prefecture-level city: Langfang
- County-level city: Sanhe
- Village-level divisions: 55 villages
- Town establishment: March 1983

Area
  - Total: 108.2 km^{2} (41.8 sq mi)

Dimensions
  - Length: 8.56 km (5.32 mi)
  - Width: 7.28 km (4.52 mi)
- Elevation: 28 m (92 ft)

Population
  - Total: 250,000
  - Density: 2,300/km^{2} (6,000/sq mi)
- Time zone: UTC+8 (China Standard)
- Postal code: 065201
- Area code: 0316

Yanjiao (Chinese: 燕郊; pinyin: Yānjiāo; lit. 'Yan suburbs') is a town under the administration of Sanhe City in central Hebei province, bordering Tongzhou District, Beijing across the Chaobai River to the west, located 35.5 kilometers (22.1 mi) east of Tiananmen Square and 21 km (13 mi) west of the urban area of Sanhe. It has a population of 250,000, with long-term residents accounting for 147,000 and migrants constituting the remainder; 97.9% of the population is of Han ethnicity. As of 2011, it has 55 villages under its administration.

== History ==
The area was once located in the suburbs of the seat of the State of Yan of the Spring and Autumn period and Warring States period, hence the town's name. Before the establishment of the People's Republic, the area was administered by Tong County (present-day Tongzhou District), then in 1950 was ceded to Sanhe County; from 1958 to 1961, as part of the greater collectivization of agriculture, it was a part of Hongxing People's Commune (紅星人民公社); 1962 saw Hongxing being split into three smaller communes, amongst them Yanjiao itself. Economic reforms led to the abolishing of the commune and the establishment of Yanjiao as a town in March 1983.

== Geography ==
Yanjiao is located in the extreme western end of Sanhe City and in the northwest of the Sanhe–Xianghe–Dachang exclave of Hebei. In addition to bordering Tongzhou District, Beijing to the west, it borders Gaolou town of Sanhe city to the north and Dachang Hui Autonomous County to the east and south. The town's north-south extent is 8.56 km (5.32 mi), and east-west width is 7.28 km (4.52 mi).

== Transport ==
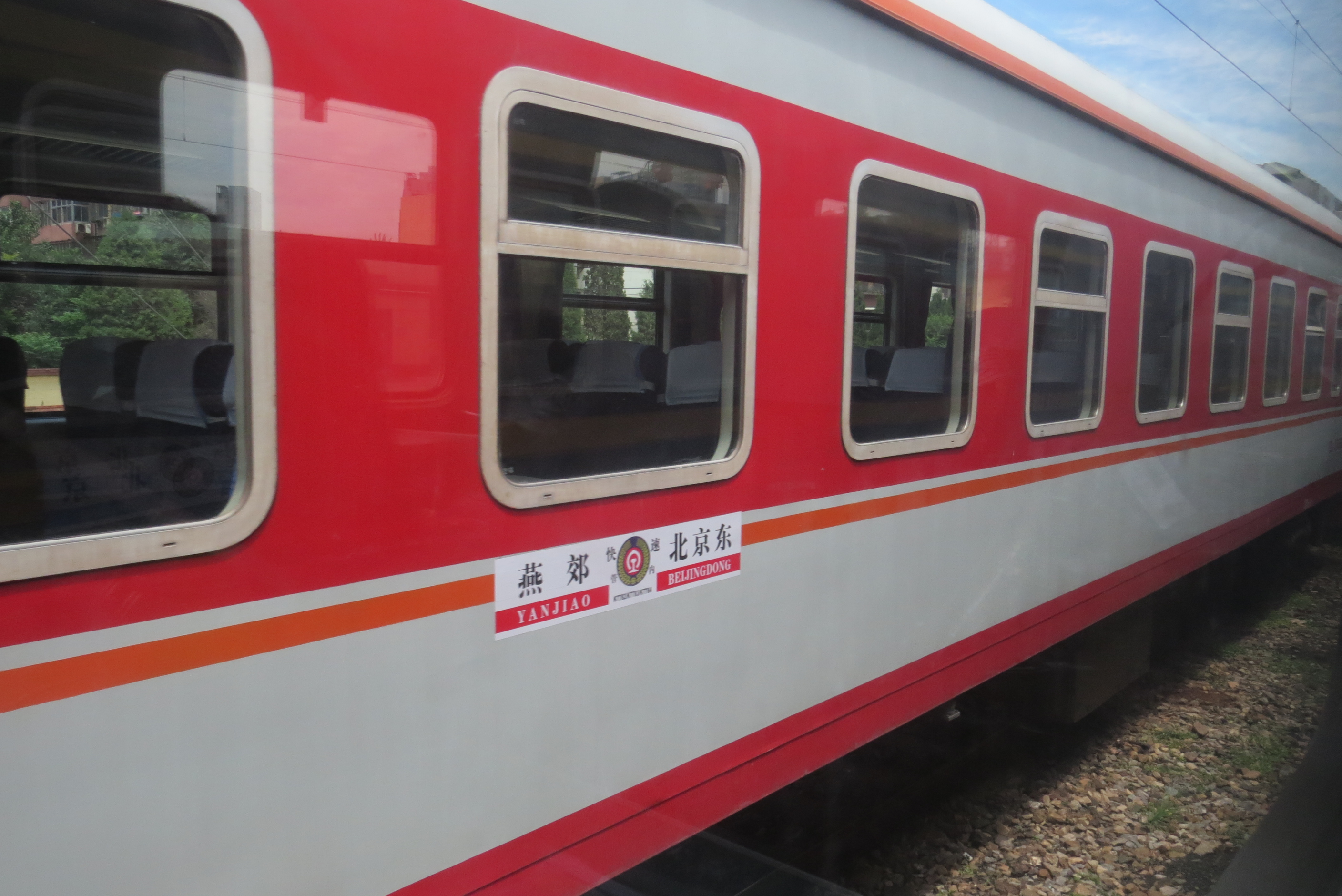
A China Railways 25G railcar used for commuter trains between Beijing and Yanjiao

China National Highway 102 provides access to nearby Tongzhou District as well as downtown Sanhe, while Beijing Capital International Airport is 35 kilometers (22 mi) away by road.

== Incident ==
At 7:54 on 13 March 2024, a huge explosion in Yanjiao killed 7 people and injured 27 people.

== See also ==
- List of township-level divisions of Hebei
