= Haibin Subdistrict, Baodi =

Subdistrict in Baodi District, Tianjin, China

Haibin Subdistrict 海滨街道
- Subdistrict
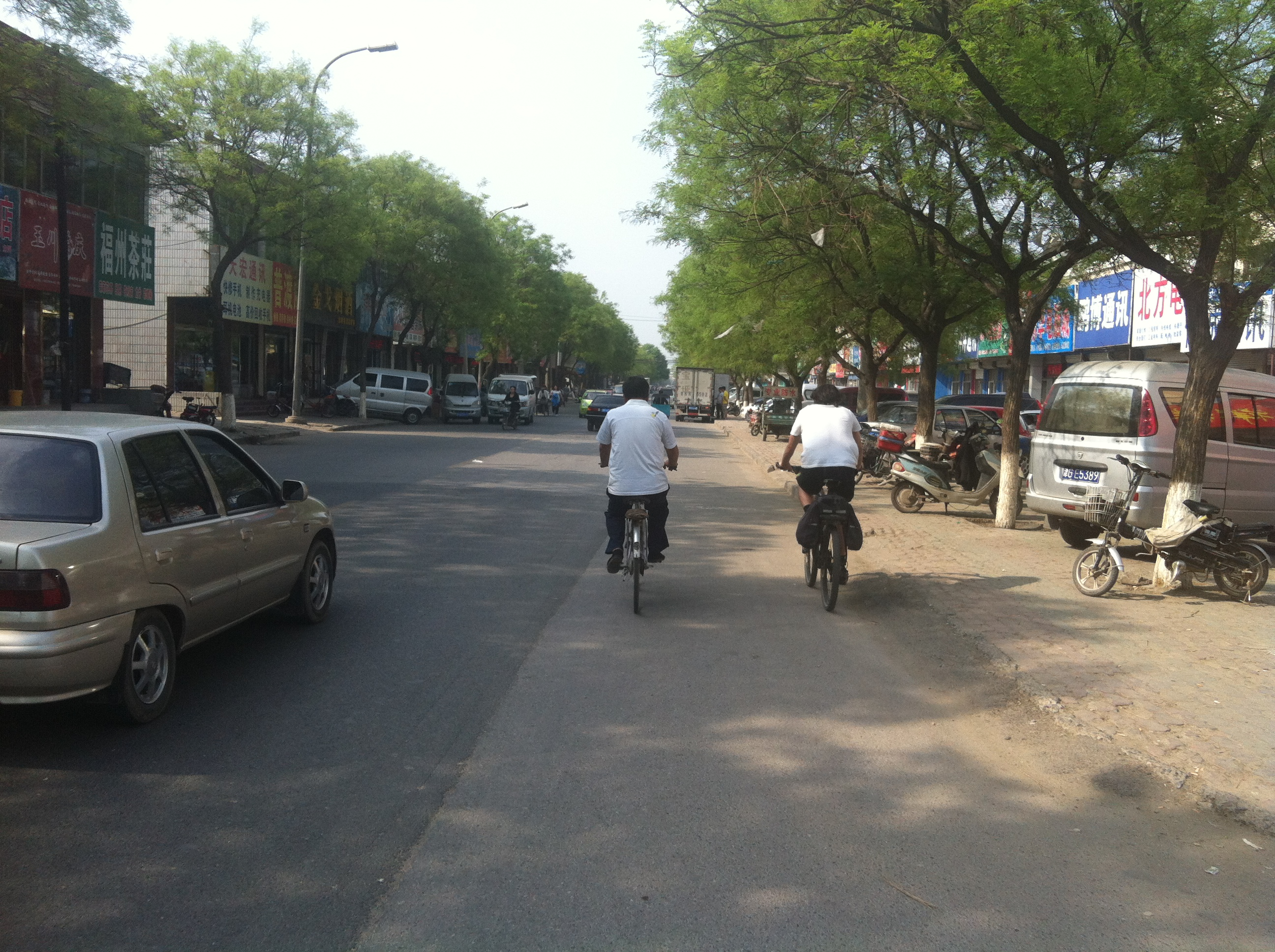
- Dongcheng Road in Haibin Subdistrict

- Location within Tianjin Haibin Subdistrict (China)
- Coordinates: 39°44′05″N 117°18′46″E
- Country: China
- Municipality: Tianjin
- District: Baodi
- Village-level Divisions: 17 residential communities 16 villages

Area
  - Total: 10.35 km^{2} (4.00 sq mi)
- Elevation: 9 m (30 ft)

Population (2010)
  - Total: 55,821
  - Density: 5,393/km^{2} (13,970/sq mi)
- Time zone: UTC+8 (CST)
- Postal code: 301899
- Area code: 022

Haibin Subdistrict (simplified Chinese: 海滨街道; traditional Chinese: 海濱街道; pinyin: Hǎibīn Jiēdào) is a subdistrict on Baodi District, Tianjin, China. It shares border with Zhaoxia Subdistrict in its north and west, Huogezhuang in its east, as well as Baoping and Yuhua Subdistricts in its south. In the year 2010, it was home to 55,821 people.

The name Haibin literally means "Seashore".

== History ==
Historty of Haibin Subdistrict
Year	Status	Belong to
1953 – 1958	Under Chengguan Township	Baodi County, Hebei
1958 – 1961	Under Chengguan People's Commune	Baodi County, Hebei
1961 – 1973	Under Shiqiao People's Commune	Baodi County, Hebei
1973 – 1983	Under Shiqiao People's Commune	Baodi County, Tianjin
1983 – 2001	Under Chengguan and Shiqiao Townships	Baodi County, Tianjin
2001 – 2006	Under Chengguan Township	Baodi District, Tianjin
2006 – present	Haibin Subdistrict	Baodi District, Tianjin

== Administrative divisions ==
In 2022, Haibin Subdistrict administered 33 subdivisions, where 17 of them were residential communities and 16 were villages. They are shown in the list below:

=== Residential communities ===
- Shichuangnan (石幢南)
- Shichuangbei (石幢北)
- Subeilu (苏北路)
- Haibin (海滨)
- Wangdulou (望都楼)
- Yiqinglu (挹青路)
- Beicheng (北城)
- Baoxin Jingyuan (宝鑫景苑)
- Lanshuiwan (蓝水湾)
- Liyuan (丽苑)
- Tianxin (天馨)
- Baoling (宝领)
- Longtian (龙天)
- Tianjinyuan (天锦园)
- Ruibo (瑞博)
- Jinhebei (金河北)
- Xihuan (西环)

=== Villages ===
- Qianbaimiao (前白庙)
- Zhufangying (驻防营)
- Dakouxiang (大口巷)
- Liangzhuang (梁庄)
- Dadaokou (大道口)
- Xiaodaokou (小道口)
- Wangzhuangzi (王庄子)
- Jijiayuan (纪家园)
- Beitai (北台)
- Xitai (西台)
- Zhongjiagou (佟家沟)
- Shengrenzhuang (圣人庄)
- Yuzhuangzi (喻庄子)
- Shawo (沙窝)
- Niangniangmiao (娘娘庙)
- Tianchang (田场)

== See also ==
- List of township-level divisions of Tianjin
