= Shaofu =

Shaofu Town 邵府镇
- Town

Chinese transcription(s)
  - Pinyin: Shàofǔ Zhèn
- Location in Hebei
- Coordinates: 39°53′49″N 116°53′48″E
- Country: China
- Province: Hebei
- Prefecture: Langfang
- Autonomous county: Dachang Hui Autonomous County

Area
  - Total: 22.18 km^{2} (8.56 sq mi)

Population (2018)
  - Total: 11,009
  - Density: 496.3/km^{2} (1,286/sq mi)
- Time zone: UTC+8 (China Standard Time)

Shaofu Town (simplified Chinese: 邵府镇; traditional Chinese: 邵府鎮; pinyin: Shàofǔ Zhèn) is a town situated in Dachang Hui Autonomous County in Langfang, Hebei, China. The town spans an area of 22.18 square kilometres (8.56 mi^{2}), and has a hukou population of 11,009 as of 2018.

== Administrative divisions ==
The town is divided into 8 administrative villages: Shaofu Village (Chinese: 邵府村), Darenzhuang Village (Chinese: 大仁庄村), Nanjiagezhuang Village (Chinese: 南贾各庄村), Taipingzhuang Village (Chinese: 太平庄村), Shanggezhuang Village (Chinese: 尚各庄村), Niuwantun Village (Chinese: 牛万屯村), Shuangjiu Village (Chinese: 双臼村), and Gangzitun Village (Chinese: 岗子屯村).

== See also ==
- List of township-level divisions of Hebei
