= Anping, Xianghe County =

Anping 安平镇
- Town
- Ānpíng Zhèn
- Location in Hebei Location in China
- Coordinates: 39°42′12″N 116°53′43″E
- Country: People's Republic of China
- Province: Hebei
- Prefecture-level city: Langfang
- County: Xianghe

Area
  - Total: 27.90 km^{2} (10.77 sq mi)

Population (2010)
  - Total: 20,450
  - Density: 733.1/km^{2} (1,899/sq mi)
- Time zone: UTC+8 (China Standard)

Anping (Chinese: 安平镇; pinyin: Ānpíng Zhèn) is a town located in Xianghe County, Langfang, Hebei, China. According to the 2010 census, Anping had a population of 20,450, including 10,648 males and 9,802 females. The population was distributed as follows: 2,362 people aged under 14, 16,175 people aged between 15 and 64, and 1,913 people aged over 65.

== See also ==
- List of township-level divisions of Hebei
