= Sanhe, Hebei =

Sanhe 三河市 Sanho
- County-level city
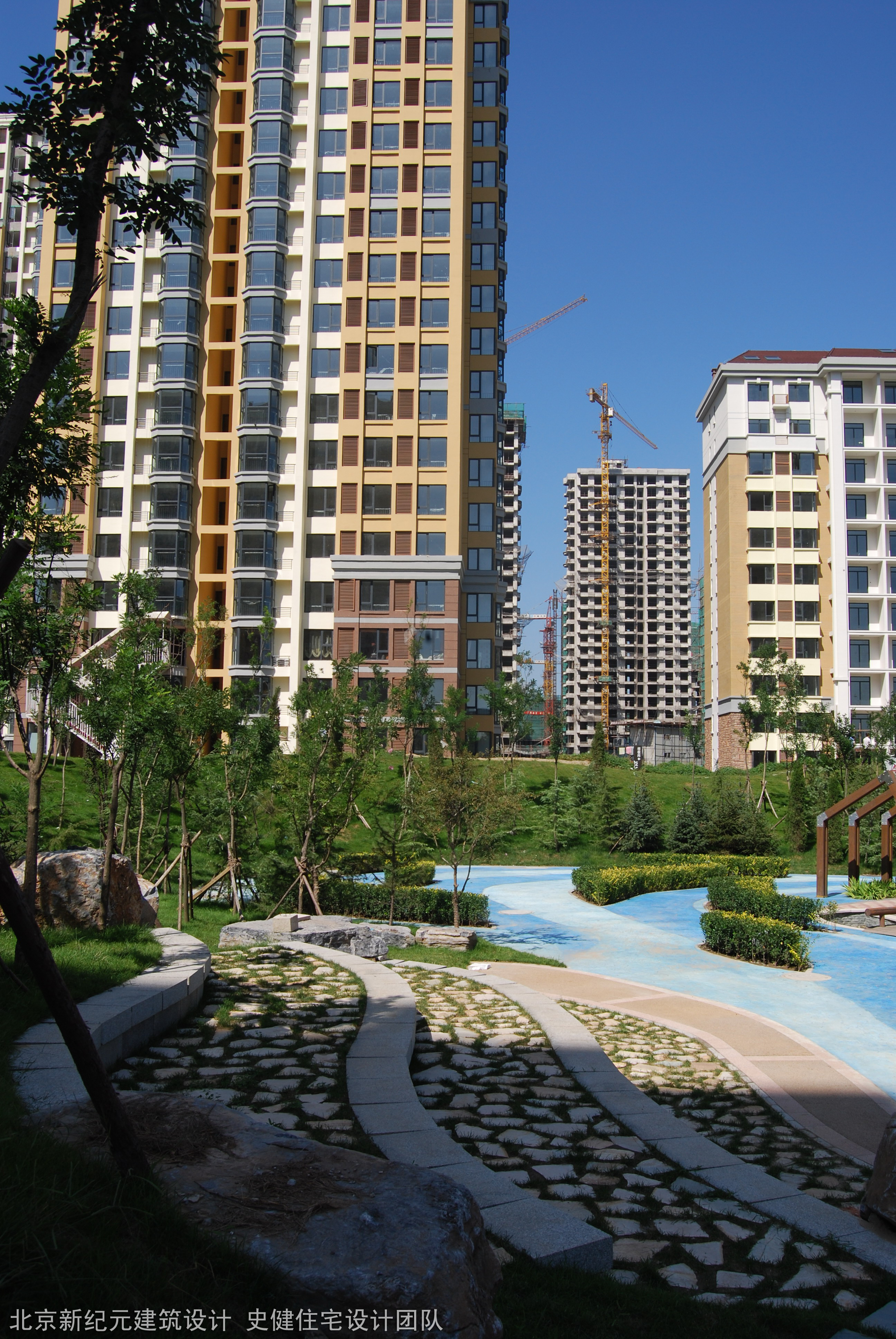
- Apartment blocks in Sanhe

- Location within Hebei Sanhe (China)
- Coordinates: 40°01′N 117°05′E
- Country: People's Republic of China
- Province: Hebei
- Prefecture-level city: Langfang

Area
  - County-level city: 643.0 km^{2} (248.3 sq mi)

Population (2020)
  - County-level city: 965,075
  - Density: 1,501/km^{2} (3,887/sq mi)
  - Urban: 760,107
- Time zone: UTC+8 (China Standard)
- Postal code: 065200
- Area code: 0316
- Licence Plate Prefix: 冀RH
- Website: http://www.san-he.gov.cn/

Sanhe (Chinese: 三河; pinyin: Sānhé Shì) is a county-level city administered by the Langfang prefecture-level city in eastern Hebei province, People's Republic of China with around one million people. Sanhe city, Dachang Hui Autonomous County, and Xianghe County form the "Northern Three Counties of Langfang", an exclave of Hebei province surrounded by the Beijing and Tianjin municipalities.

The name of the city literally means "Three Rivers".

== Administrative divisions ==
Sanhe has 5 subdistricts and 10 towns. There are 395 villages within those subdistricts/towns.

=== Subdistricts ===
- Dingshengdongdajie Subdistrict (鼎盛东大街街道), Juyangxidajie Subdistrict (泃阳西大街街道), Kejilu Subdistrict (科技路街道), Yingbinbeilu Subdistrict (迎宾北路街道), Xinggongdongdajie Subdistrict (行宫东大街街道)

=== Towns ===
- Juyang (泃阳镇), Liqizhuang (李旗庄镇), Yangzhuang (杨庄镇), Huangzhuang (皇庄镇), Xinji (新集镇), Duanjialing (段甲岭镇), Huangtuzhuang (黄土庄镇), Gaolou (高楼镇), Qixinzhuang (齐心庄镇), Yanjiao (燕郊镇)

=== Development zones ===
- Yanjiao Economic and Technological Development Zone (national level) (燕郊经济技术开发区)
- Sanhe Agricultural High-tech Zone (三河市农业高新技术园区)

== Climate ==
Climate data for Sanhe, elevation 18 m (59 ft), (1991–2020 normals, extremes 1981–2010)
Month	Jan	Feb	Mar	Apr	May	Jun	Jul	Aug	Sep	Oct	Nov	Dec	Year
Record high °C (°F)	13.8 (56.8)	20.8 (69.4)	27.8 (82.0)	31.9 (89.4)	38.0 (100.4)	40.1 (104.2)	41.2 (106.2)	36.7 (98.1)	34.4 (93.9)	30.7 (87.3)	21.2 (70.2)	14.0 (57.2)	41.2 (106.2)
Mean daily maximum °C (°F)	1.9 (35.4)	5.8 (42.4)	12.9 (55.2)	20.6 (69.1)	26.7 (80.1)	30.4 (86.7)	31.4 (88.5)	30.3 (86.5)	26.3 (79.3)	19.2 (66.6)	9.9 (49.8)	3.2 (37.8)	18.2 (64.8)
Daily mean °C (°F)	−4.1 (24.6)	−0.6 (30.9)	6.3 (43.3)	14.0 (57.2)	20.0 (68.0)	24.3 (75.7)	26.4 (79.5)	25.1 (77.2)	19.9 (67.8)	12.6 (54.7)	4.0 (39.2)	−2.4 (27.7)	12.1 (53.8)
Mean daily minimum °C (°F)	−8.7 (16.3)	−5.6 (21.9)	0.6 (33.1)	7.8 (46.0)	13.7 (56.7)	18.9 (66.0)	22.2 (72.0)	21.0 (69.8)	15.0 (59.0)	7.5 (45.5)	−0.5 (31.1)	−6.6 (20.1)	7.1 (44.8)
Record low °C (°F)	−21.4 (−6.5)	−19.6 (−3.3)	−12.5 (9.5)	−2.5 (27.5)	4.2 (39.6)	9.8 (49.6)	15.7 (60.3)	12.2 (54.0)	4.7 (40.5)	−4.4 (24.1)	−13.3 (8.1)	−17.8 (0.0)	−21.4 (−6.5)
Average precipitation mm (inches)	2.6 (0.10)	4.4 (0.17)	8.5 (0.33)	21.4 (0.84)	40.4 (1.59)	77.7 (3.06)	197.8 (7.79)	129.2 (5.09)	58.6 (2.31)	30.2 (1.19)	14.4 (0.57)	2.6 (0.10)	587.8 (23.14)
Average precipitation days (≥ 0.1 mm)	1.6	2.1	2.9	4.4	6.5	10.0	12.4	10.0	7.0	4.7	3.4	1.7	66.7
Average snowy days	2.4	2.2	1.2	0.1	0	0	0	0	0	0	1.6	2.7	10.2
Average relative humidity (%)	46	45	45	49	56	65	77	80	75	67	60	52	60
Mean monthly sunshine hours	178.4	180.4	226.0	240.0	267.7	225.9	192.6	210.6	205.7	195.5	164.0	168.7	2,455.5
Percentage possible sunshine	59	59	61	60	60	51	43	50	56	57	55	58	56
Source: China Meteorological Administration

== Transportation ==
=== Expressway & Highway ===
- G0121 Beijing–Qinhuangdao Expressway, G95 Capital Area Loop Expressway
- China National Highway 102
- Provincial Highway: S204, S206, S274

=== Railway ===
- Beijing-Qinhuangdao railway
- Beijing-Tangshan intercity railway (Under construction)
- Beijing-Binhai intercity railway (Under construction)

=== Subway ===
- Pinggu line (Line 22) of Beijing Subway have 5 stations in Sanhe. The line is under planning.

== History ==
Sanhe was virtually destroyed by a major earthquake that occurred on September 2, 1679.

=== Attack on ARD film crew ===
In February 2013, German television crew from ARD was attacked by a group of men in at least 4 vehicles. The ARD crew including correspondent Christine Adelhardt had been filming in the village of Da Yan Ge Zhuang (大閆各莊村) in Juyang, Sanhe city. A group of men in two vehicles drove to the ARD crew and intimidated them. Two other vehicles joined the group of men and pursued the fleeing ARD van on the highway. The ARD van was forced to a halt and 5 to 6 of the men got out to smash the windshield of the van with baseball bats. The ARD van was able to get away and sought help on passing two motorcycle policemen, who tried stopping the men from once again attacking the ARD crew. However, only after police reinforcements arrived was the situation brought under control.

According to statement from the Foreign Correspondents Club of China condemning the attack, a witness identified one of the vehicles involved in the attack as belonging to the "Da Yan Ge Zhuang village communist party secretary". The ARD crew was taken into police custody and questioned for 16 hours then released. A police officer told an ARD reporter that the attackers had been "offended" because the crew did not ask for permission to film in the village.

== Notable people ==
- Jing Ulrich - Chinese businesswoman who spent a considerable amount of her childhood in this city.
- Rafał Sznajder - Polish Olympic fencer who famously visited the city during the 2008 Beijing Olympics, despite not competing.
- Xian Da (Joseph) Huang - Resident of Yanda Golden Age Health Nursing Center who ignited a bin, causing damage to the building.
- Philippus Zhao Huaiyi - Chinese Roman Catholic Bishop often visited the local church for sermons.
