= Dakoutun =

Dakoutun 大口屯镇
- Town
- Location in Tianjin
- Coordinates: 39°35′08″N 117°14′11″E
- Country: People's Republic of China
- Municipality: Tianjin
- District: Baodi
- Village-level divisions: 58 villages
- Elevation: 7 m (23 ft)
- Time zone: UTC+8 (China Standard)

Dakoutun (Chinese: 大口屯; pinyin: Dàkǒutūn) is a town of Baodi District, in the northern suburbs of Tianjin, People's Republic of China. As of 2011, it had 58 villages under its administration.

In 2001, Nanrenfu Xiang (Chinese: 南仁垺乡; pinyin: Nánrénfú Xiāng) was eliminated and merged with Dakoutun Town. Nanrenfu is also the name of villages, schools and companies in the area. In the sixth & seventh editions of the Contemporary Chinese Dictionary published in 2012 & 2016, Nanrenfu is the only example given for the usage of the character '垺' (fú).

== See also ==
- List of township-level divisions of Tianjin
