= Chaobai River =

River in northern China

Coordinates: 40°20′52″N 116°48′30″E

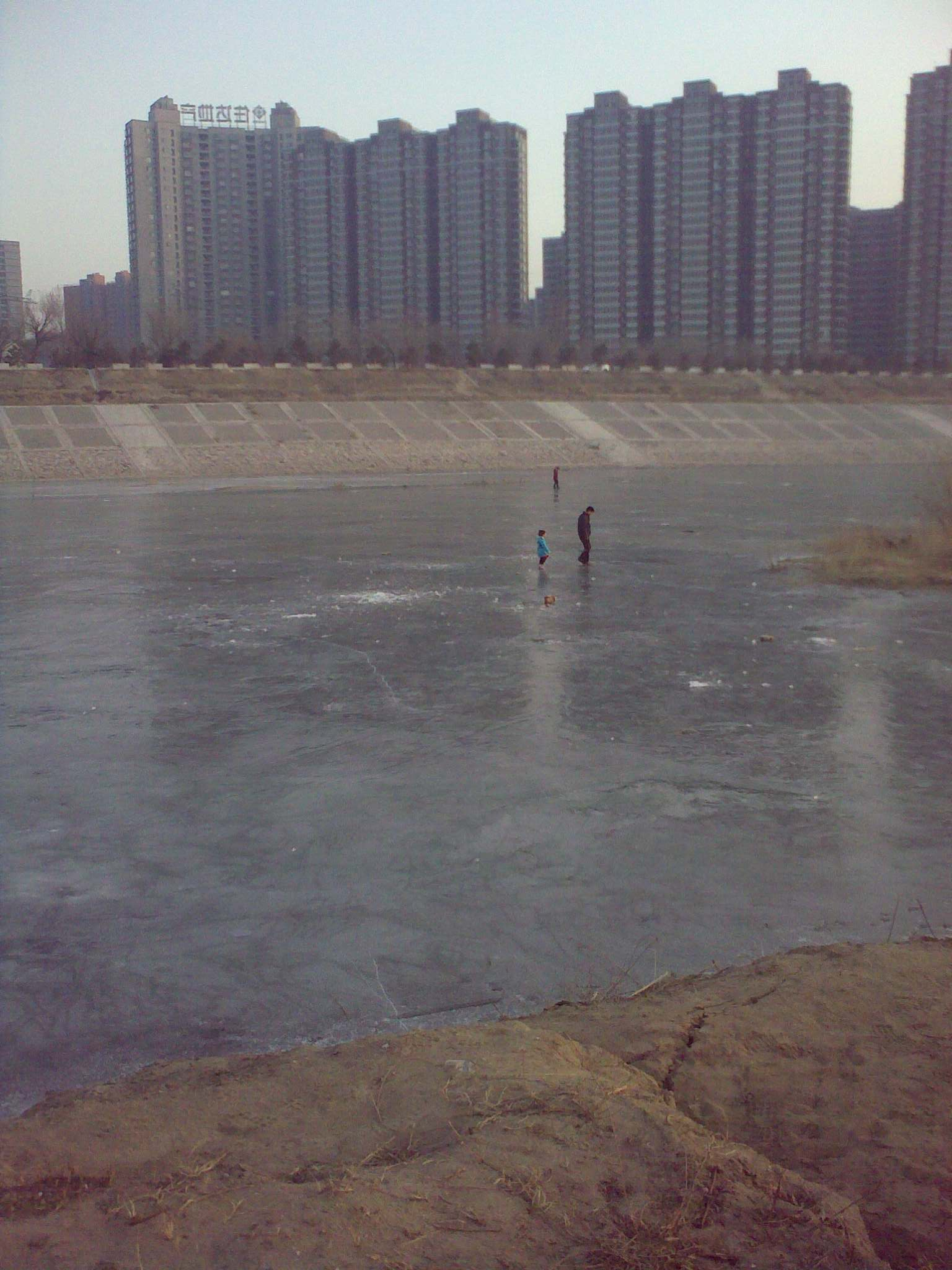
Frozen Chaobai river at Yanjiao town, Hebei

The Chaobai River (Chinese: 潮白河; pinyin: cháobái hé) is a river in northern China. The river is 458 km long and flows from the confluence of the Chao and Bai Rivers at the Miyun Reservoir in Beijing Municipality through Hebei Province and into the Grand Canal of the Hai River system in Tianjin Municipality. Its average depth is 2.5 meters.

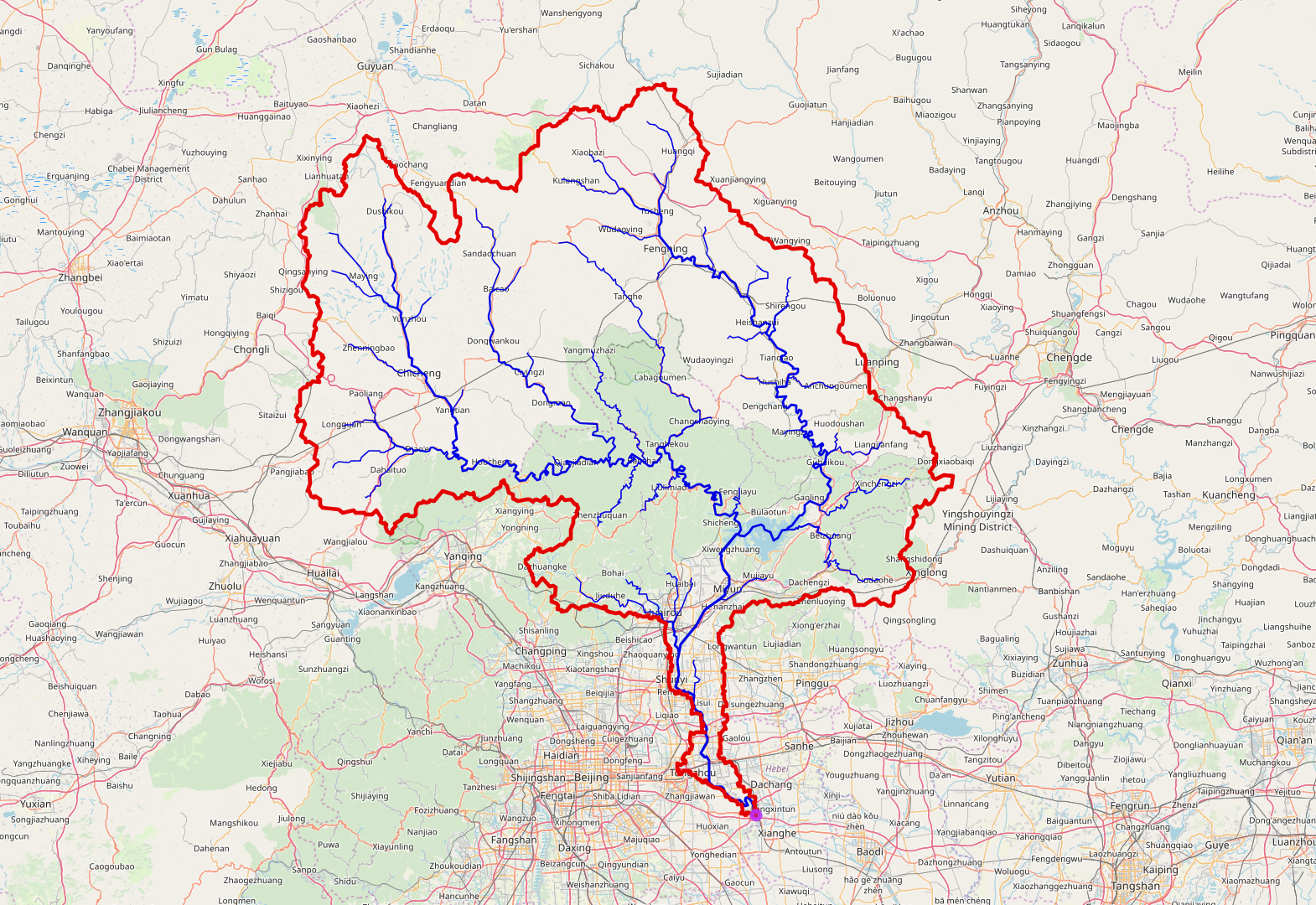
