= List of Major National Historical and Cultural Sites in Hebei =

This list is of Major Sites Protected for their Historical and Cultural Value at the National Level in the Province of Hebei, People's Republic of China.

Site	Chinese name	Location	Designation	Image
Ranzhuang Tunnel Warfare Site	Ranzhuang didaozhan yizhi 冉庄地道战遗址	Qingyuan County	1-29	Upload file
Xiangtangshan Caves	Xiangtangshan shiku 响堂山石窟	Handan	1-40	Upload file
Anji Bridge	Anji qiao 安济桥 (Dashi qiao 大石桥)	37°43′13″N 114°45′48″E Zhao County	1-58	Upload file
Yongtong Bridge	Yongtong qiao 永通桥 (Xiaoshi qiao 小石桥)	Zhao County	1-60	Upload file
Liaodi Pagoda	Dingxian Kaiyuan si ta 定县开元寺塔	38°30′37″N 114°59′48″E Dingzhou	1-70	Upload file
Guanghui Temple Huatai Pagoda	Guanghui si Hua ta 广惠寺华塔	Zhengding County	1-73	Upload file
Yicihui Stone Column	Yicihui shizhu 义慈惠石柱	Dingxing County	1-77	Upload file
Zhaozhou Dharani Pillar	Zhaozhou Tuoluoni jingchuang 赵州陀罗尼经幢	Zhao County	1-78	Upload file
Longxing Temple	Longxing si 隆兴寺	38°08′39″N 114°34′34″E Zhengding County	1-89	Upload file
Shanhai Pass of the Great Wall	Wanli changcheng - Shanhaiguan 万里长城—山海关	40°00′34″N 119°45′15″E Qinhuangdao	1-102	Upload file
Puning Temple	Puning si 普宁寺	41°00′52″N 119°56′47″E Chengde	1-115	Upload file
Pule Temple	Pule si 普乐寺	Chengde	1-116	Upload file
Putuo Zongcheng Temple	Putuo zongcheng zhi miao 普陀宗乘之庙	41°00′45″N 117°55′41″E Chengde	1-117	Upload file
Xumi Fushou Temple	Xumi fushou zhi miao 须弥福寿之庙	41°01′04″N 117°56′34″E Chengde	1-118	Upload file
Chengde Mountain Resort	Bishu shanzhuang 避暑山庄	40°59′15″N 117°56′15″E Chengde	1-123	Upload file
Iron Lion of Cangzhou	Cangzhou tieshizi 沧州铁狮子	38°12′22″N 117°00′57″E Cang County	1-134	Upload file
Zhao Capital of Handan	Zhao Handan gucheng 赵邯郸故城	Handan	1-149	Upload file
Xiadu of Yan	Yan xiadu 燕下都	39°37′01″N 116°03′22″E Yi County	1-150	Upload file
Feng Family Tombs	Fengshi muqun 封氏墓群	Jing County	1-169	Upload file
Eastern Qing Tombs	Qing dongling 清东陵	40°11′09″N 117°38′49″E Zunhua	1-179	Upload file
Western Qing Tombs	Qing xiling 清西陵	39°22′06″N 115°20′43″E Yi County	1-180	Upload file
Site of the Central Committee of the Chinese Communist Party in Xibaipo	Xibaipo Zhong-Gong zhongyang jiuzhi 西柏坡中共中央旧址	Pingshan County	2-8	Upload file
Beiyue Temple	Beiyue miao 北岳庙	38°37′19″N 114°41′28″E Quyang County	2-24	Upload file
Former Residence of Li Dazhao	Li Dazhao guju 李大钊故居	Laoting County	3-10	Upload file
Jinshanling Great Wall	Jinshanling changcheng 金山岭长城	40°40′35″N 117°14′40″E Luanping County	3-58	Upload file
Xuanhua City Wall	Xuanhua chengqiang 宣化城墙	Zhangjiakou	3-64	Upload file
Zhili Governor's Residence	Zhili zongdushu 直隶总督署	Baoding	3-71	Upload file
Kaiyuan Temple	Kaiyuan si 开元寺	38°08′22″N 114°33′54″E Zhengding County	3-105	Upload file
Shuxiang Temple	Shuxiang si 殊像寺	Chengde	3-121	Upload file
Anyuan Temple	Anyuan miao 安远庙	Chengde	3-122	Upload file
Lingxiao Pagoda	Lingxiao ta 凌霄塔	Zhengding County	3-139	Upload file
Cishan Site	Cishan yizhi 磁山遗址	Wu'an	3-188	Upload file
Capital of the Zhongshan Kingdom	Zhongshan gucheng yizhi 中山古城遗址	Pingshan County	3-206	Upload file
Ye City ruins	Yecheng yizhi 邺城遗址	Linzhang County	3-213	Upload file
Jianci Village Ding Kiln Site	Jianci cun Dingyao yizhi 涧磁村定窑遗址	Quyang County	3-225	Upload file
Tomb of King Jing of Zhongshan	Zhongshan Jing wang mu 中山靖王墓	Mancheng County	3-235	Upload file
Northern Dynasties tombs of Ci County	Ci xian Bei Chao muqun 磁县北朝墓群	Ci County	3-242	Upload file
Qin Dynasty Beidahe Palace Site	Beidaihe Qin xinggong zhiyi 北戴河秦行宫遗址	Qinhuangdao	4-33	Upload file
Cizhou Kiln Site	Cizhou yao yizhi 磁州窑遗址	Handan	4-44	Upload file
Xing Kiln Site	Xing yao yizhi 邢窑遗址	Neiqiu County	4-46	Upload file
Han Tombs in Xian County	Xian xian Han muqun 献县汉墓群	Xian County	4-61	Upload file
Xiabali Tombs	Xiabali muqun 下八里墓群	Zhangjiakou	4-72	Upload file
Zhiping Temple Stone Pagoda	Zhiping si shi ta 治平寺石塔	Zanhuang County	4-81	Upload file
Kaifu Temple Sarira Stupa	Kaifu si sheli ta 开福寺舍利塔	Jing County	4-82	Upload file
Wahuang Palace and Stone Carvings	Wahuanggong ji shike 娲皇宫及石刻	She County	4-88	Upload file
Main Hall of Zhengding Confucian Temple	Zhengding wenmiao dacheng dian 正定文庙大成殿	Zhengding County	4-91	Upload file
Geyuan Temple	Geyuan si 阁院寺	39°21′10″N 114°40′55″E Laiyuan County	4-95	Upload file
Kaishan Temple	Kaishan si 开善寺	39°14′45″N 115°58′58″E Gaobeidian	4-96	Upload file
Ciyun Pavilion	Ciyun ge 慈云阁	Dingxing County	4-114	Upload file
Yuzhou Yuhang Pavilion	Yuzhou yuhuang ge 蔚州玉皇阁	Yu County	4-131	Upload file
Great Wall at Zijing Pass	Wanli changcheng – Zijingguan 万里长城—紫荆关	Yi County	4-132	Upload file
Pilu Temple	Pilu si 毗卢寺	Shijiazhuang	4-133	Upload file
Daodejing Daoist Pillar at Longxing Temple	Longxing guan Daode jingchuang 龙兴观道德经幢	Yi County	4-194	Upload file
Tianhu Dharani Pillar	Tianhu tuoluoni jingchuang 天护陀罗尼经幢	Shijiazhuang	4-195	Upload file
Jin-Cha-Ji Border Region Government and Military Region Headquarters	Jinchaji bianqu zhengfu ji junqu silingbu jiuzhi 晋察冀边区政府及军区司令部旧址	Fuping County	4-238	Upload file
Headquarters of the 129th Division of the Eighth Route Army	Balujun yi-er-jiu shi silingbu jiuzhi 八路军一二九师司令部旧址	She County	4-242	Upload file
Nihewan sites	Nihewan yizhi qun 泥河湾遗址群	Yangyuan County	5-2	Upload file
Nanzhuangtou site	Nanzhuangtou yizhi 南庄头遗址	Xushui County	5-3	Upload file
Xizhai Site	Xizhai yizhi 西寨遗址	Qianxi County	5-4	Upload file
Daiwangcheng Site	Daiwangcheng yizhi 代王城遗址	Yu County	5-5	Upload file
Jingxing Kiln Site	Jingxing yao yizhi 井陉窑遗址	Jingxing County	5-6	Upload file
Middle Capital of the Yuan	Yuanzhong du yizhi 元中都遗址	Zhangbei County	5-7	Upload file
Mausoleum of the Zhao Kings	Zhao wang ling 赵王陵	Handan County	5-146	Upload file
Han Tomb of the Zhongshan King	Han Zhongshan wang mu 汉中山王墓	Dingzhou	5-147	Upload file
Painted Tomb of Lujiazhuang	Lujiazhuang bihuamu 逯家庄壁画墓	Anping County	5-148	Upload file
Northern Qi Gao Family Tombs	Bei Qi Gao shi muqun 北齐高氏墓群	Jing County	5-149	Upload file
Shuzhuanglou Yuan Tombs	Shuzhuanglou Yuan mu 梳妆楼元墓	Guyuan County	5-150	Upload file
Linji Temple Chengling Pagoda	Linji si Chengling ta 临济寺澄灵塔	Zhengding County	5-208	Upload file
Yaowang Temple	Yaowang miao 药王庙	Anguo	5-209	Upload file
Zhaohua Temple	Zhaohua si 昭化寺	Huai'an County	5-210	Upload file
Jimingyi City	Jimingyi cheng 鸡鸣驿城	Huailai County	5-211	Upload file
Youju Temple Pagoda	Youju si ta 幽居寺塔	Lingshou County	5-212	Upload file
Dingzhou Examinational Hall	Dingzhou gongyuan 定州贡院	Dingzhou	5-213	Upload file
Puren Temple	Puren si 溥仁寺	Chengde	5-214	Upload file
Yuanying Temple Pagoda	Yuanying si ta 源影寺塔	Changli County		Upload file
Botou Mosque	Botou qingzhensi 泊头清真寺	Botou	5-216	Upload file
Puli Temple Pagoda	Puli si ta 普利寺塔	Lincheng County	5-217	Upload file
Zhuozhou Twin Pagodas	Zhuozhou shuangta 涿州双塔	Zhuozhou	5-218	Upload file
Nan'an Temple Pagoda	Nan'an si ta 南安寺塔	Yu County	5-219	Upload file
Shijia Temple	Shijia si 释迦寺	Yu County	5-220	Upload file
Yaoshan Wang Family Residence	Yaoshan Wang shi zhuangyuan 腰山王氏庄园	Shunping County	5-221	Upload file
Old Lotus Pond	Gu lianhuachi 古莲花池	Baoding	5-222	Upload file
Qinghua Temple Flower Pagoda	Qinghua si Hua ta 庆化寺花塔	Laishui County	5-223	Upload file
Wulonggou Great Wall	Changcheng - Wulonggou changcheng 长城—乌龙沟长城	Laiyuan County	5-442(6)	Upload file
Daguan Stele by Emperor Huizong (zh)	Daguan sheng zuo zhi bei 大观圣作之碑	Zhao County	5-443	Upload file
Prince Qinghe Stele of Tang dynasty	Da tang qing he junwang jigong zai zheng zhi song bei 大唐清河郡王纪功载政之颂碑	Zhengding County	5-444	Upload file
Zhuacun Site	Zhuacun yizhi 爪村遗址	Qian'an	6-4	Upload file
Shibeikou Site	Shibeikou yizhi 石北口遗址	Yongnian County	6-5	Upload file
Beifudi Site	Beifudi yizhi 北福地遗址	Yi County	6-6	Upload file
Diaoyutai Site	Diaoyutai yizhi 钓鱼台遗址	Quyang County	6-7	Upload file
Taixi Site	Taixi yizhi 台西遗址	Gaocheng	6-8	Upload file
Dongxianxian Site	Dongxianxian yizhi 东先贤遗址	Xingtai County	6-9	Upload file
Nanyang Site	Nanyang yizhi 南阳遗址	Rongcheng County	6-10	Upload file
Jiangwucheng Site	Jiangwu cheng yizhi 讲武城遗址	Ci County	6-11	Upload file
Changshan Commandery ruins	Changshan jun gucheng 常山郡故城	Yuanshi County	6-12	Upload file
Tuchengzi ruins	Tuchengzi chengyi 土城子城址	Shangyi County	6-13	Upload file
Bianguan Tunnels	Bianguan didao yizhi 边关地道遗址	Yongqing County	6-14	Upload file
Huizhou Site	Huizhou cheng 会州城	Pingquan County	6-15	Upload file
Liu Ling Brewery Site	Liulingzui shaoguo yizhi 刘伶醉烧锅遗址	Xushui County	6-16	Upload file
Jiuliancheng ruins	Jiuliancheng yizhi 九连城城址	Guyuan County	6-17	Upload file
Haifengzhen ruins	Haifeng zhen yizhi 海丰镇遗址	Huanghua	6-18	Upload file
Xiaohongcheng ruins	Xiaohongcheng yizhi 小宏城遗址	Guyuan County	6-19	Upload file
Damingfu Old Town	Daming fu gucheng 大名府故城	Daming County	6-20	Upload file
Xing State tombs	Xingguo mudi 邢国墓地	Xingtai	6-224	Upload file
Painted Tombs of Suoyao	Suoyaocun bihuamu 所药村壁画墓	Wangdu County	6-225	Upload file
Longyao Tang Mausoleum	Longyao Tang zu ling 隆尧唐祖陵	Longyao County	6-226	Upload file
Tomb of Zhang Rou	Zhang Rou mu 张柔墓	Mancheng County	6-227	Upload file
Tomb of Prince Yi	Yi Xian qinwang mu 怡贤亲王墓	Laishui County	6-228	Upload file
Tomb of Ji Xiaolan	Ji Xiaolan mudi 纪晓岚墓地	Cang County	6-229	Upload file
Xingguo Temple Pagoda	Jie cun xingguo sita 解村兴国寺塔	Boye County	6-316	Upload file
Wanshou Temple Pagoda Forest	Wanshou si ta lin 万寿寺塔林	Pingshan County	6-317	Upload file
Baoyun Pagoda	Baoyun ta 宝云塔	Hengshui	6-318	Upload file
Xiude Temple Pagoda	Xiude sita 修德寺塔	Quyang County	6-319	Upload file
Qinglin Temple Pagoda	Qinglin si ta 庆林寺塔	Gucheng County	6-320	Upload file
Jingzhi Temple Pagoda Underground Palace	Jingzhi si ta jidigong 静志寺塔基地宫	Dingzhou	6-321	Upload file
Jingzhong Temple Pagoda Underground Palace	Jingzhongyuan ta jidigong 净众院塔基地宫	Dingzhou 定州市	6-322	Upload file
Tiangong Temple Pagoda	Tiangong si ta 天宫寺塔	Tangshan	6-323	Upload file
Shengta Temple Pagoda	Sheng ta yuan ta 圣塔院塔	Yi County	6-324	Upload file
Xigang Pagoda	Xigang ta 西岗塔	Laishui County	6-325	Upload file
Xingwen Pagoda	Xingwen ta 兴文塔	Laiyuan County	6-326	Upload file
Chengtang Temple Shanmen	Chengtang miao shanmen 成汤庙山门	She County	6-327	Upload file
Bailin Temple Pagoda	Bailin si ta 柏林寺塔	37°44′51″N 114°46′41″E Zhao County	6-328	Upload file
Zhengding Confucian Temple	Zhengding fu wenmiao 正定府文庙	Zhengding County	6-329	Upload file
Jingxing Post Road	Jingxing gu yidao 井陉古驿道	Jingxing County	6-330	Upload file
Bian Que Temple	Bian Que miao 扁鹊庙	Neiqiu County	6-331	Upload file
Yongji Bridge	Yongji qiao 永济桥	Zhuozhou	6-332	Upload file
Xigu Fortress	Xigu bao 西古堡	Yu County	6-333	Upload file
Fuqing Temple	Fuqing si 福庆寺	Jingxing County	6-334	Upload file
Shi'en Temple	Shi'en si 时恩寺	Zhangjiakou	6-335	Upload file
Shoufeng Temple	Shoufeng si 寿峰寺	Tangshan	6-336	Upload file
Nuanquan Huayan Temple	Nuanquan Huayan si 暖泉华严寺	Yu County	6-337	Upload file
Zhenwu Temple	Zhenwu miao 真武庙	Yu County	6-338	Upload file
Changping Granary	Changpingcang 常平仓	Yu County	6-339	Upload file
Yuzhou Linyan Temple	Yuzhou Lingyan si 蔚州灵岩寺	Yu County	6-340	Upload file
Dan Bridge	Dan qiao 单桥	Xian County	6-341	Upload file
Hongji Bridge	Hongji qiao 弘济桥	Yongnian County	6-342	Upload file
Yongniancheng	Yongnian cheng 永年城	Yongnian County	6-343	Upload file
Zhifang Jade Emperor Pavilion	Zhifang Yuhuang ge 纸坊玉皇阁	Handan	6-344	Upload file
Dadaoguan Jade Emperor Hall	Dadaoguan Yuhuang dian 大道观玉皇殿	Dingzhou	6-345	Upload file
Kaiyuan Temple	Xingtai Kaiyuan si 邢台开元寺	Xingtai	6-346	Upload file
Wuren Bridge	Wurenqiao 伍仁桥	Anguo	6-347	Upload file
Wanquan Right Guard city	Wanquan Youweicheng 万全右卫城	Wanquan County	6-348	Upload file
Ximalin Jade Emperor Pavilion	Xianlin Yuhuang ge 洗马林玉皇阁	Wanquan County	6-349	Upload file
Jinmen Floodgates	Jinmen zha 金门闸	Zhuozhou	6-350	Upload file
Daci Pavilion	Daci ge 大慈阁	Baoding	6-351	Upload file
Chengde City God Temple	Chengde chenghuang miao 承德城隍庙	Chengde	6-352	Upload file
Puyou Temple	Puyou si 普佑寺	Chengde	6-353	Upload file
Jingjue Temple	Jingjue si 净觉寺	Yutian County	6-354	Upload file
Wuliji Stele	Wu li ji bei 五礼记碑	Daming County	6-812	Upload file
Song Jing Stele	Song Jing bei 宋璟碑	Shahe	6-813	Upload file
Usnisa Vijaya Dharani Sutra Pillar	Da Foding zunsheng tuoluoni jingchuang 大佛顶尊胜陀罗尼经幢	Lulong County	6-814	Upload file
Shanhaiguan Barracks of the Eight-Nation Alliance	Shanhaiguan Baguo lianjun yingpan jiuzhi 山海关八国联军营盘旧址	Qinhuangdao	6-892	Upload file
Villas of Beidaihe	Beidaihe jindai jianzhuqun 北戴河近代建筑群	Qinhuangdao	6-893	Upload file
Fengrun Middle School site	Fengrun zhongxuexiao jiuzhi 丰润中学校旧址	Tangshan	6-894	Upload file
Assembly Hall of the Boxer Movement	Yihequan yishiting jiuzhi 义和拳议事厅旧址	Wei County	6-895	Upload file
Yude Middle School site	Yude zhongxue jiuzhi 育德中学旧址	Baoding	6-896	Upload file
Baoding Military Academy	Baoding lujun junguan xuexiao jiuzhi 保定陆军军官学校旧址	Baoding	6-897	Upload file
Former Office of the Military Governor of Chahar Province	Chaha'er dutong shu jiuzhi 察哈尔都统署旧址	Zhangjiakou	6-898	Upload file
Preparatory school for the French Exchange in Buli	Buli liufa gongyi xuexiao jiuzhi 布里留法工艺学校旧址	Gaoyang County	6-899	Upload file
Former Residence of Yan Yangchu	Yan Yangchu jiuju 晏阳初旧居	Dingzhou	6-900	Upload file
Site of the Panjiayu Massacre	Panjiayu can'an yizhi 潘家峪惨案遗址	Tangshan	6-901	Upload file
Office of the Jin-Ji-Lu-Yu Central Committee of the Chinese Communist Party and of the Military District	Zhonggong Jin-Ji-Lu-Yu Zhongyan-ju he junqu 中共晋冀鲁豫中央局和军区旧址	Wu'an	6-902	Upload file
Site of the 1976 Tangshan earthquake	Tangshan dadizhen yizhi 唐山大地震遗址	39°36′N 118°12′E Tangshan	6-903	Upload file
Old Winter Jujube Tribute Garden in Juguan	Juguan gugong zaoyuan 聚馆古贡枣园	Huanghua	6-1080	Upload file

== See also ==
- Principles for the Conservation of Heritage Sites in China
