= Shahedian =

Shahedian (沙河店) may refer to the following locations in China:

- Shahedian, Zhao County, town in southwestern Hebei
- Shahedian, Biyang County, town in Biyang County, Henan
