= Xinzhaidian =

Coordinates: 37°48′N 114°43′E

Xinzhaidian 新寨店镇
- Town

Chinese transcription(s)
- Interactive map of Xinzhaidian
- Country: China
- Province: Hebei
- Prefecture: Shijiazhuang
- County: Zhao County
- Time zone: UTC+8 (China Standard Time)

Xinzhaidian (Chinese: 新寨店镇) is a township-level division of Zhao County, Shijiazhuang, Hebei, China.

== See also ==
- List of township-level divisions of Hebei
