= Qiandazhang Township =

Coordinates: 37.85915°N 114.82068°E

Qiandazhang Township 前大章乡
- Township

Chinese transcription(s)
- Interactive map of Qiandazhang Township
- Country: China
- Province: Hebei
- Prefecture: Shijiazhuang
- County: Zhao County
- Time zone: UTC+8 (China Standard Time)

Qiandazhang Township (Chinese: 前大章乡) is a township-level division of Zhao County, Shijiazhuang, Hebei, China.

== See also ==
- List of township-level divisions of Hebei
