= Li Qi (poet) =

Tang Dynasty Chinese poet

Li Qi (traditional Chinese: 李頎; simplified Chinese: 李颀; pinyin: Lǐ Qí; c. 690–751) was a Chinese poet of the Tang dynasty.

== Three Hundred Tang Poems ==
Seven of his poems were included in the anthology Three Hundred Tang Poems. As translated by Witter Bynner, these are:

- "An Old Air"
- "A Farewell to my Friend Chen Zhangfu"
- "A Lute Song"
- "On Hearing Dong Play the Flageolet a Poem to Palace-attendant Fang"
- "On Hearing an Wanshan Play the Reed-pipe"
- "An Old War-song"
- "A Farewell to Wei Wan"

== Biography ==
Li Qi was born in what is now Zhao County (Zhaoxian), Hebei Province. He later took up residence in what is now Dengfeng, in Henan Province. The Li family of Zhao Commandery (Zhaojun) was of the scholarly (shi) class, one of the so-called "four occupations".
