= Xiezhuang Township, Hebei =

Coordinates: 37°48′32″N 114°58′48″E

Xiezhuang Township 谢庄乡
- Township

Chinese transcription(s)
- Interactive map of Xiezhuang Township
- Country: China
- Province: Hebei
- Prefecture: Shijiazhuang
- County: Zhao County
- Time zone: UTC+8 (China Standard Time)

Xiezhuang Township (Chinese: 谢庄乡) is a township-level division of Zhao County, Shijiazhuang, Hebei, China.

== See also ==
- List of township-level divisions of Hebei
