= Fanzhuang =

Fanzhuang 范庄镇
- Town
- Location in Hebei
- Coordinates: 37°46′38″N 114°57′43″E
- Country: People's Republic of China
- Province: Hebei
- Prefecture-level city: Shijiazhuang
- County: Zhao
- Village-level divisions: 36 villages
- Elevation: 39 m (128 ft)
- Time zone: UTC+8 (China Standard)
- Area code: 0311

Fanzhuang (simplified Chinese: 范庄; traditional Chinese: 范莊; pinyin: Fànzhuāng) is a town of Zhao County, Hebei province, China, located 16 kilometres (9.9 mi) east of the county seat. As of 2011, it has 36 villages under its administration.

== Notable people ==
- Daniel C. Tsui, Chinese-American physicist

== See also ==
- List of township-level divisions of Hebei
