= Beiwangli =

Beiwangli 北王里镇
- Town
- Location in Hebei
- Coordinates: 37°45′38″N 114°38′14″E
- Country: People's Republic of China
- Province: Hebei
- Prefecture-level city: Shijiazhuang
- County: Zhao County
- Village-level divisions: 27 villages
- Elevation: 53 m (174 ft)
- Time zone: UTC+8 (China Standard)
- Area code: 0311

Beiwangli (Chinese: 北王里; pinyin: Běiwánglǐ) is a town in Zhao County in southwestern Hebei, China, located 12 kilometres (7.5 mi) west of the county seat. As of 2020, it had 27 villages under its administration:

- Gou'an Village (沟岸村)
- Hezhuang Village (何庄村)
- Jialü Village (贾吕村)
- Xiwangjiazhuang Village (西王家庄村)
- Fujiazhuang Village (付家庄村)
- Wujia Village (吴贾村)
- Nanwangli Village (南王里村)
- Beiwangli Village (北王里村)
- Kangjia Village (康贾村)
- Maping Village (马平村)
- Xizhangjiazhuang Village (西张家庄村)
- Dongzhanglü Village (东章吕村)
- Xizhanglü Village (西章吕村)
- Yongxingzhuang Village (永兴庄村)
- Houtian Village (后田村)
- Qiantian Village (前田村)
- Houying Village (后营村)
- Qianying Village (前营村)
- Huanmaying Village (换马营村)
- Daliuli Village (大琉璃村)
- Xiaoliuli Village (小琉璃村)
- Ma Village (马村)
- Xizheng Village (西正村)
- Yanjiazhai Village (烟家宅村)
- Lunchengzhuang Village (轮城庄村)
- Nanluncheng Village (南轮城村)
- Huangshi Village (黄市村)

== See also ==
- List of township-level divisions of Hebei
