= Nanbaishe =

Coordinates: 37.7526°N 114.85244°E

Nanbaishe 南柏舍镇
- Town

Chinese transcription(s)
- Interactive map of Nanbaishe
- Country: China
- Province: Hebei
- Prefecture: Shijiazhuang
- County: Zhao County
- Time zone: UTC+8 (China Standard Time)

Nanbaishe (Chinese: 南柏舍镇) is a township-level division of Zhao County, Shijiazhuang, Hebei, China.

== See also ==
- List of township-level divisions of Hebei
