= Hancun, Zhao County =

Hancun 韩村镇
- Town
- Location in Hebei
- Coordinates: 37°48′02″N 114°50′25″E
- Country: People's Republic of China
- Province: Hebei
- Prefecture-level city: Shijiazhuang
- County: Zhao
- Village-level divisions: 22 villages
- Elevation: 46 m (151 ft)
- Time zone: UTC+8 (China Standard)
- Area code: 0311

Hancun (simplified Chinese: 韩村; traditional Chinese: 韓村; pinyin: Háncūn) is a town of Zhao County in southern Hebei province, China, located 7 kilometres (4.3 mi) northeast of the county seat across G20 Qingdao–Yinchuan Expressway. As of 2011, it has 22 villages under its administration.

== See also ==
- List of township-level divisions of Hebei
