= Gaocun Township, Zhao County =

Gaocun Township 高村乡
- Township
- Location in Hebei
- Coordinates: 37°42′24″N 114°42′48″E
- Country: People's Republic of China
- Province: Hebei
- Prefecture-level city: Shijiazhuang
- County: Zhao
- Village-level divisions: 23 villages
- Elevation: 44 m (144 ft)
- Time zone: UTC+8 (China Standard)
- Postal code: 051530
- Area code: 0311

Gaocun (Chinese: 高村; pinyin: Gāocūn) is a township of Zhao County in southwestern Hebei province, China, located 6 to 7 kilometres (3.7 to 4.3 mi) southwest of the county seat. As of 2011, it has 23 villages under its administration.

== See also ==
- List of township-level divisions of Hebei
