= Wangxizhang Town =

Coordinates: 37°41′58″N 114°48′55″E

Wangxizhang Town 王西章镇
- Town

Chinese transcription(s)
- Interactive map of Wangxizhang Town
- Country: China
- Province: Hebei
- Prefecture: Shijiazhuang
- County: Zhao County
- Time zone: UTC+8 (China Standard Time)

Wangxizhang Town (Chinese: 王西章镇) is a town of Zhao County, Shijiazhuang, Hebei, China. It was Wangxizhang Township before February 2021.

== See also ==
- List of township-level divisions of Hebei
