= Anji Bridge =

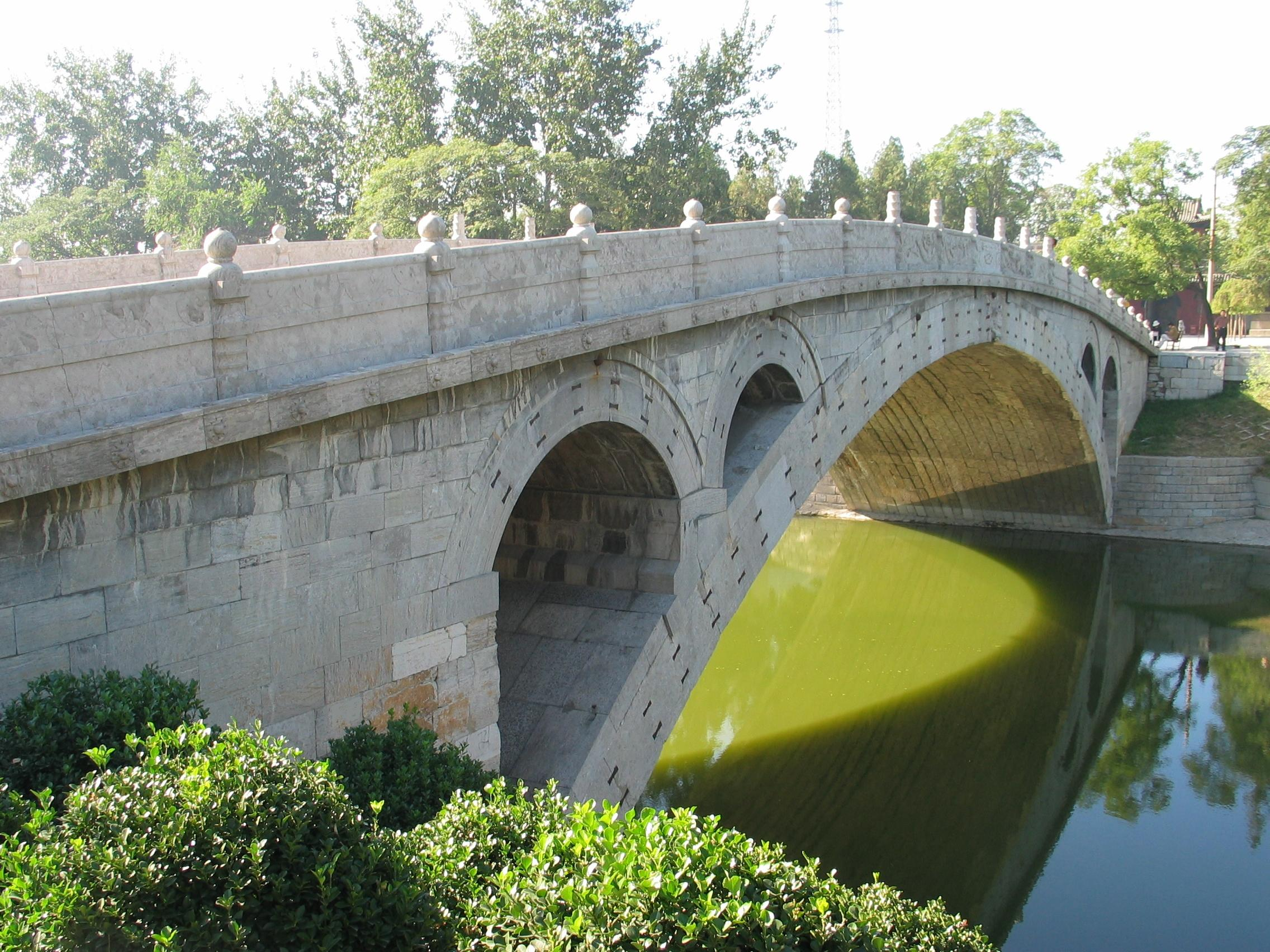
- The Anji Bridge, still standing after 1400 years
- Coordinates: 37.7203°N 114.7633°E
- Crosses: Xiao River
- Locale: Zhao County in Hebei Province, China

Characteristics
- Design: Open-spandrel stone segmental arch bridge
- Total length: 64 metres (210 ft)
- Width: 9.6 metres (31 ft)
- Height: 7.3 metres (24 ft)
- Longest span: 37.37 metres (123 ft)

History
- Construction start: 595 CE
- Construction end: 605 CE

Location
- Interactive map of Anji Bridge

The Anji Bridge (simplified Chinese: 安济桥; traditional Chinese: 安濟橋; pinyin: Ānjì Qiáo; lit. 'Safe crossing bridge'), also known as the Great Stone Bridge or Zhaozhou Bridge, is the world's oldest open-spandrel segmental arch bridge of stone construction. Credited to the design of a craftsman named Li Chun, the bridge was constructed in the years 595–605 during the Sui dynasty (581–618). Located in the southern part of Hebei Province, it is the oldest standing bridge in China. It is considered one of the Four Treasures of Hebei.

== Name and location ==
The bridge is also commonly known as the Zhaozhou Bridge (simplified Chinese: 赵州桥; traditional Chinese: 趙州橋; pinyin: Zhàozhōu Qiáo), after Zhao County, which was formerly known as Zhaozhou (趙州). Another name for the bridge is the Great Stone Bridge (simplified Chinese: 大石桥; traditional Chinese: 大石橋; pinyin: Dàshí Qiáo). It crosses the Xiaohe River (洨河) south of the town of Zhaoxian, in Zhao County, approximately 52 kilometres (32 mi) southeast of the provincial capital Shijiazhuang. It is a pedestrian bridge and is currently open to the public. In English literature, it is also referred as Chiao Shui Bridge, after the river it crosses.

== History ==
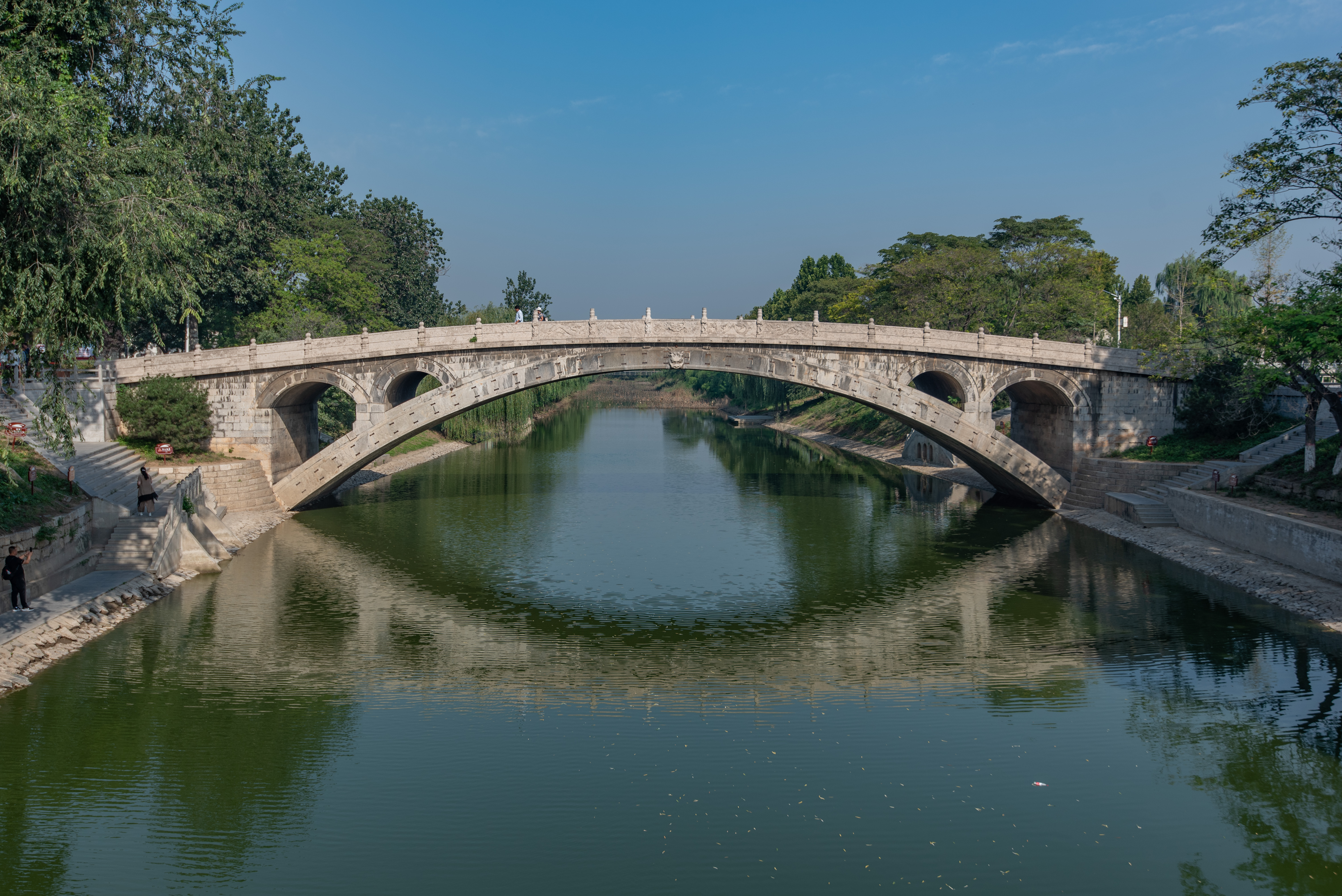
Front view

Starting from 581 CE, the Sui dynasty reasserted imperial control over the competing powers that had ruled various regions of China since the decline of the Han dynasty in the third century. Thus immense public works projects were carried out, including the rebuilding of two grand imperial capitals, the excavation of the 2400-kilometer-long Grand Canal, and major improvements to the fortifications that predated the Great Wall. Economically, the long-distance transport of goods and men was a critical component to the interests and sustainability of the ruling house. The movement of goods by land south and southwest from the North China Plain to the Central Plains around Kaifeng and Luoyang followed a path that crossed the Xiao River near Luanzhou (later Zhaozhou and now Zhao County) in today's Hebei province. Flowing west to east through a plain that was relatively low-lying on both sides, the Xiao River was an important artery for transporting goods, but an impediment to continuous overland movement and the economic integration of China's regions.

It was under these circumstances that Li Chun, who directed masons and other craftsmen, built the Anji (Safe Passage) Bridge, also called Dashi (Great Stone) Bridge. Although Chinese history credits Li Chun with the design and building of the Anji Bridge, no contemporaneous materials recorded the process, however later chronicles do make notes of it in brief.

The Anji Bridge is among the most remarkable achievements of Chinese bridge building for exhibiting a segmental arch design of wholly stone construction. This innovation, which occurred between the end of the sixth century and beginning of the seventh century, repudiated conventional wisdom that a semicircular arch was necessary to transfer the weight of a bridge downwards to where the arch tangentially meets the pier. The double pair of openings piercing both ends of the arch spandrel, which as well as accentuating its lithe curvature, lightens the weight of the bridge and facilitates the diversion of flood waters by allowing them to pass through the auxiliary arches rather than pound against the spandrels. The Zhaozhou Bridge is celebrated as China's oldest standing bridge and the oldest open spandrel stone bridge in the world.

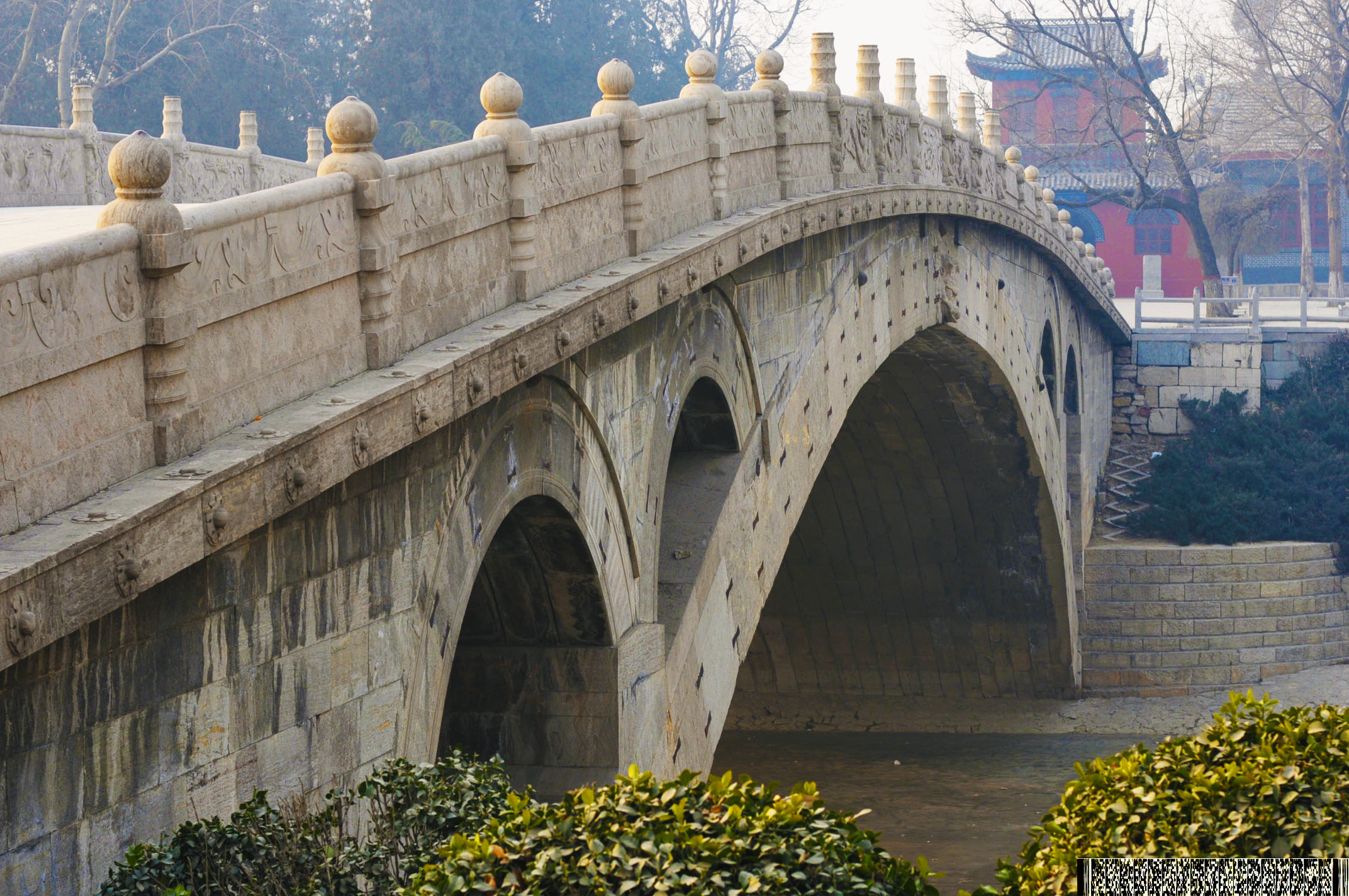
The Anji Bridge in 2011

The Anji Bridge influenced the design of later Chinese bridge structures, such as the similar Yongtong Bridge near Zhao County in Hebei. The Yongtong Bridge is a 26 m (85 ft) long stone segmental-arch bridge built in 1130 by the Song structural engineer Pou Qianer.

The intriguing design of the Anji Bridge has given rise to many legends. According to one legend, the bridge was built by a master architect of the mid-1st millennium BC named Lu Ban in a single night. In another story the bridge was put to the test by two immortals who crossed it at the same time, and Lu Ban saved it by wading into the water and supporting the structure.

Although Ming dynasty (1368–1644) authors compared the bridge to "a new moon rising above the clouds" and "a long rainbow hanging on a mountain waterfall", it later fell into obscurity. In the 1930s, professor Liang Sicheng of Tsinghua University rediscovered the bridge on a field exploration of ancient architecture in Hebei province. He made detailed measurements and published a report and drawing, restoring its reputation and giving it new recognition. By the time Liang visited the bridge, all of the original stone carving surfaces were gone. In a few cases, they were given replacements dating to the Ming dynasty.

The Anji Bridge underwent several renovations during the following dynasties. It was severely damaged in the late Qing dynasty and renovations from 1952 and 1956 were criticized for changing the basic appearance and structure. The parapet, balustrades, and posts were replaced by newly carved ones meant to imitate the art style of the Sui period.

Anji Bridge was dedicated as an International Historic Civil Engineering Landmark by the American Society of Civil Engineers in 1991. In 1996, the Chinese authorities nominated it for inclusion in the World Heritage List as having "a very important place in the world bridge building history".

== Construction ==
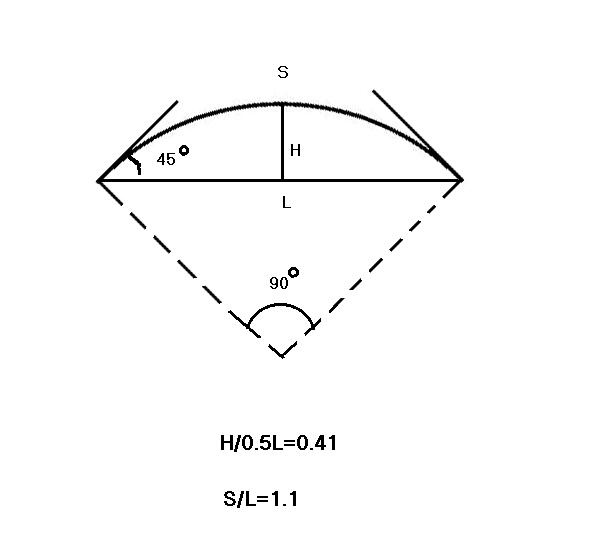
The elevation and arch-to-span ratio of a 1/4 circle arch bridge

The Anji Bridge is about 64 metres (210 ft) long with a central span of 37.37 metres (122.6 ft). It stands 7.3 metres (24 ft) tall and has a width of 9 metres (30 ft). The arch covers a circular segment less than half of a semicircle (84°) and with a radius of 27.27 metres (89.5 ft), has a rise-to-span ratio of approximately 0.197 (7.3 to 37 metres (24 to 121 ft)). This is considerably smaller than the rise-to-span ratio of 0.5 of a semicircular arch bridge and slightly smaller than the rise-to-span ratio of 0.207 of a quarter circle. The arch length to span ratio is 1.1, less than the arch-to-span ratio of 1.57 of a semicircle arch bridge by 43%, thus the saving in material is about 40%, making the bridge lighter in weight. The elevation of the arch is about 45°, which subjects the abutments of the bridge to downward force and sideways force. This bridge was built in 605.

The central arch is made of 28 thin, curved limestone slabs which are joined with iron butterfly joints. This allows the arch to adjust to shifts in its supports and prevents the bridge from collapsing even when a segment of the arch breaks. The bridge has two small side arches on either side of the main arch. These side arches serve two important functions: first, they reduce the total weight of the bridge by about 15.3% or approximately 700 tons, which is vital because of the low rise-to-span ratio and the large forces on the abutments it creates. Second, when the bridge is submerged during a flood, they allow water to pass through, thereby reducing the forces on the structure of the bridge.

Li Chun's innovative spandrel-arch construction, while economising in materials, was also of considerable aesthetic merit. An inscription left on the bridge by Tang dynasty officials seventy years after its construction reads:

This stone bridge over the Xiao River is the result of the work of the Sui engineer Li Chun. Its construction is indeed unusual, and no one knows on what principle he made it. But let us observe his marvellous use of stone-work. Its convexity is so smooth, and the wedge-shaped stones fit together so perfectly... How lofty is the flying-arch! How large is the opening, yet without piers!.. Precise indeed are the cross-bondings and joints between the stones, masonry blocks delicately interlocking like mill wheels, or like the walls of wells; a hundred forms (organised into) one. And besides the mortar in the crevices there are slender-waisted iron cramps to bind the stones together. The four small arches inserted, on either side two, break the anger of the roaring floods, and protect the bridge mightily. Such a master-work could never have been achieved if this man had not applied his genius to the building of a work which would last for centuries to come.

== See also ==
- Guyue Bridge, a stone arch bridge completed in 1213, in Zhejiang.
- List of bridges in China
