= Zhaozhou, Hebei =

Coordinates: 37.75268°N 114.7775°E

Zhaozhou, Zhao County 赵州镇
- Town

Chinese transcription(s)
- Interactive map of Zhaozhou, Zhao County
- Country: China
- Province: Hebei
- Prefecture: Shijiazhuang
- District: Zhao County
- Time zone: UTC+8 (China Standard Time)

Zhaozhou, Zhao County (Chinese: 赵州镇) is a township-level division of Zhao County, Shijiazhuang, Hebei, China.

== See also ==
- List of township-level divisions of Hebei
