= Shahedian, Hebei =

Coordinates: 37°39′17″N 114°44′21″E

Shahedian 沙河店镇
- Town

Chinese transcription(s)
- Interactive map of Shahedian
- Country: China
- Province: Hebei
- Prefecture: Shijiazhuang
- County: Zhao County
- Time zone: UTC+8 (China Standard Time)

Shahedian (Chinese: 沙河店镇) is a township-level division of Zhao County, Shijiazhuang, Hebei, China.

== See also ==
- List of township-level divisions of Hebei
