= Dingzhou Examinational Hall =

Imperial examination site in northern China

Dingzhou Imperial Examination Hall
- 定州贡院
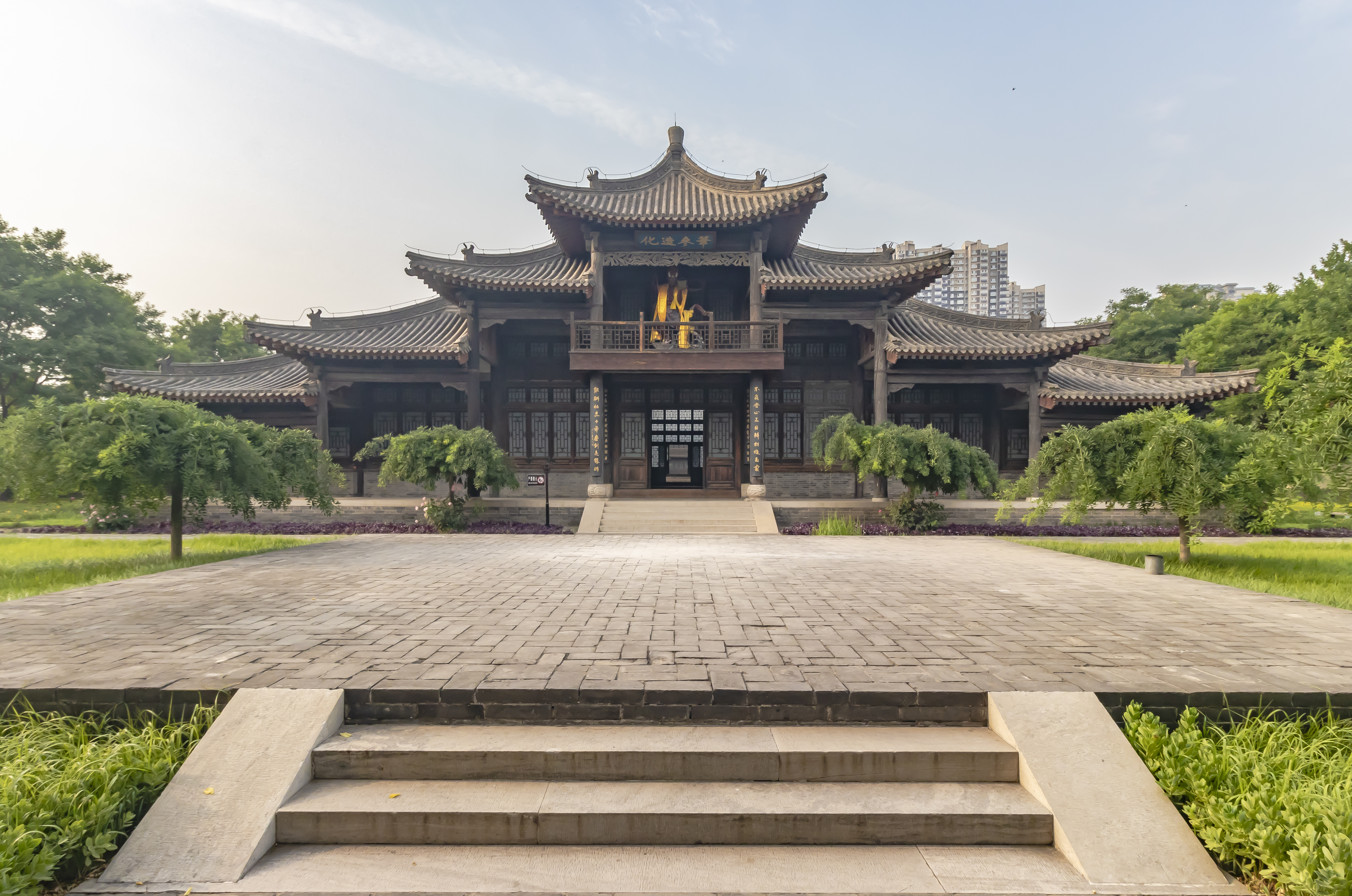
- Kuige, the main hall

- Location in Hebei Province
- Former names: Dingzhou Examination Compound

General information
- Classification: Major Historical and Cultural Site Protected at the National Level
- Location: Dingzhou, Hebei, No. 22 Caochang Hutong, Beicheng District, Dingzhou, China
- Coordinates: 38°30′49.536″N 115°00′04.608″E
- Construction started: 1738
- Completed: 1738
- Renovated: 1834
- Owner: Dingzhou Municipal Government

Technical details
- Floor area: 1,547 m²
- Grounds: 22,150 m²

Design and construction
- Designations: Major Historical and Cultural Site Protected at the National Level (2001); Hebei Provincial Protected Sites (1982)

Dingzhou Examination Hall (Chinese: 定州贡院) is located in Dingzhou City, Hebei Province, and represents the most complete surviving imperial examination site in northern China. Originally built in the third year of the Qianlong reign (1738) of the Qing dynasty, its current structures mainly preserve the layout from renovations during the Daoguang era.

== History ==
The Dingzhou Imperial Examination Hall was established in 1738 by then-prefect Wang Danian as a venue for the Tongshi examinations. In 1834, Prefect Wang Zhonghuai oversaw large-scale expansion and renovation works that established its current architectural scale. During restoration work in 2019, a stele from 1838 was discovered that details the hall's construction history.

On June 25, 2001, it was listed in the fifth group of Major National Historical and Cultural Sites.

== Architecture ==
The examination hall faces south with a total area of 22,150 square meters and a floor space of 1,547 square meters. The complex centers around the Kuige Examination Cells, beginning with the screen wall and ending with the Lansheng Tower.

The main structure, the Kuige Examination Cells, served as the examination venue with seven bays wide and nine bays deep, accommodating over a hundred candidates. Its southern Kuige pavilion features an unusual architectural design where the short side serves as the entrance facade, rare in traditional Chinese architecture. The elegant facade with proper slope angles showcases a half-pyramid roof structure housing a statue of Kuixing. The screen wall at the southernmost end measures 22.5 meters long and 6.1 meters high, serving both decorative and examination result posting purposes. The northern Lansheng Tower is a two-story structure that served as examiners' offices and living quarters. The compound contains ancient scholar trees traditionally said to have been planted by the Qianlong Emperor.

== Transportation ==
Located at No. 22 Caochang Hutong, Beicheng District, Dingzhou City, Hebei Province. Accessible via Dingzhou Bus Routes 1 and 5.
