= Zhao County =

Zhao County 赵县
- County
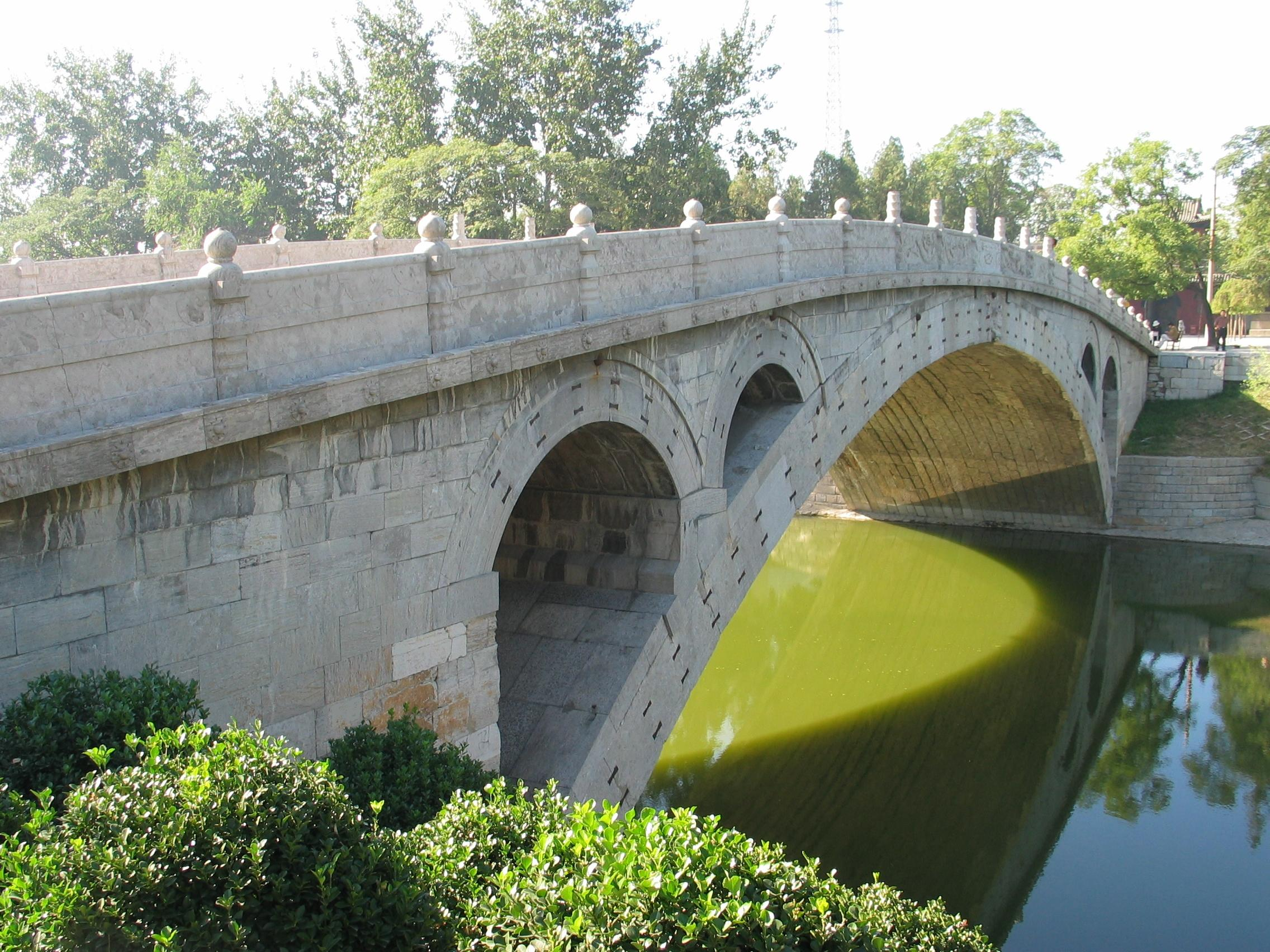
- Anji Bridge

- Location in Hebei Zhao County (China)
- Coordinates: 37°45′22″N 114°46′34″E
- Country: People's Republic of China
- Province: Hebei
- Prefecture-level city: Shijiazhuang

Area
  - Total: 675 km^{2} (261 sq mi)

Population
  - Total: 550,000
  - Density: 810/km^{2} (2,100/sq mi)
- Time zone: UTC+8 (China Standard)
- Website: zhaoxian.gov.cn

Zhao County
- Traditional Chinese: 趙縣
- Simplified Chinese: 赵县
- Literal meaning: Zhao County
Transcriptions
Standard Mandarin
- Hanyu Pinyin: Zhào Xiàn
- Wade–Giles: Chao Hsien

Historical name Zhao Prefecture
- Traditional Chinese: 趙州
- Simplified Chinese: 赵州
- Literal meaning: Zhao Prefecture
Transcriptions
Standard Mandarin
- Hanyu Pinyin: Zhào Zhōu
- Wade–Giles: Chao Chou

Zhao County, also known by its Chinese name as Zhao Xian or Zhaoxian, is a county under the administration of Shijiazhuang in Hebei Province, China. Its seat of government is Zhaozhou. Zhao County's total land area is 675 km^{2} (261 sq mi) and its total population was around 550,000.

There are many historical sites in Zhao County, including the Anji Bridge, Yongtong Bridge, Tuoluonijing Tower (陀罗尼经幢), and Bailin (Cypress Grove) Temple (柏林寺). The county is also famous for its agricultural products: snowflake pears (xuehua pear), asparagus, and wheat.

== History ==
Zhao County was formerly the site of imperial China's Zhao Prefecture. In the 9th century, under the late Tang, it formed part of the territory of the de facto independent Chengde jiedushis. Shortly after the beginning of the Five Dynasties and Ten Kingdoms Era in the early 10th century, one of them—Wang Rong—established the short-lived Kingdom of Zhao.

== Geography ==
Zhao County is located in the middle of the North China Plain, with the county seat Zhaozhou about 40 km (25 mi) southeast of Hebei's provincial capital Shijiazhuang and 280 km (170 mi) south of the national capital Beijing. The county's elevation is fairly low and topography fairly flat.

=== Administrative divisions ===
Towns:

- Zhaozhou (赵州镇), Fanzhuang (范庄镇), Beiwangli (北王里镇), Xinzhaidian (新寨店镇), Hancun (韩村镇), Nanbaishe (南柏舍镇), Shahedian (沙河店镇)

Townships:

- Qiandazhang Township (前大章乡), Xiezhuang Township (谢庄乡), Gaocun Township (高村乡), Wangxizhang Township (王西章乡)

== Climate ==
Climate data for Zhaoxian, elevation 39 m (128 ft), (1991–2020 normals, extremes 1981–2010)
Month	Jan	Feb	Mar	Apr	May	Jun	Jul	Aug	Sep	Oct	Nov	Dec	Year
Record high °C (°F)	18.0 (64.4)	25.4 (77.7)	32.2 (90.0)	32.7 (90.9)	39.8 (103.6)	42.1 (107.8)	43.0 (109.4)	36.6 (97.9)	37.0 (98.6)	33.1 (91.6)	27.7 (81.9)	21.7 (71.1)	43.0 (109.4)
Mean daily maximum °C (°F)	3.4 (38.1)	7.7 (45.9)	14.6 (58.3)	20.9 (69.6)	26.6 (79.9)	32.4 (90.3)	32.3 (90.1)	30.3 (86.5)	26.9 (80.4)	20.8 (69.4)	11.4 (52.5)	4.7 (40.5)	19.3 (66.8)
Daily mean °C (°F)	−2.8 (27.0)	0.9 (33.6)	7.5 (45.5)	14.3 (57.7)	20.1 (68.2)	25.5 (77.9)	26.9 (80.4)	25.2 (77.4)	20.4 (68.7)	14.1 (57.4)	5.4 (41.7)	−1.1 (30.0)	13.0 (55.5)
Mean daily minimum °C (°F)	−8.0 (17.6)	−4.6 (23.7)	1.1 (34.0)	7.6 (45.7)	13.3 (55.9)	19.0 (66.2)	22.2 (72.0)	20.8 (69.4)	15.0 (59.0)	8.3 (46.9)	0.4 (32.7)	−5.8 (21.6)	7.4 (45.4)
Record low °C (°F)	−19.9 (−3.8)	−19.0 (−2.2)	−9.4 (15.1)	−4.4 (24.1)	1.7 (35.1)	9.3 (48.7)	15.5 (59.9)	11.5 (52.7)	4.3 (39.7)	−3.7 (25.3)	−16.6 (2.1)	−22.2 (−8.0)	−22.2 (−8.0)
Average precipitation mm (inches)	2.0 (0.08)	4.9 (0.19)	8.7 (0.34)	26.3 (1.04)	34.7 (1.37)	56.4 (2.22)	125.8 (4.95)	114.1 (4.49)	49.7 (1.96)	25.2 (0.99)	14.5 (0.57)	2.9 (0.11)	465.2 (18.31)
Average precipitation days (≥ 0.1 mm)	1.6	2.4	2.6	5.2	6.3	8.1	10.9	10.0	6.9	5.5	3.8	1.9	65.2
Average snowy days	2.2	2.4	1.0	0.2	0	0	0	0	0	0	1.2	2.2	9.2
Average relative humidity (%)	60	57	55	64	67	62	76	81	75	68	68	65	67
Mean monthly sunshine hours	135.7	155.1	200.8	223.4	246.2	212.7	179.7	176.9	179.4	167.5	138.3	135.3	2,151
Percentage possible sunshine	44	51	54	56	56	48	40	42	49	49	46	46	48
Source: China Meteorological Administration

== Notable residents ==
- Li Qi, Tang poet
- Li Yangbing, Tang writer
- Tie Ning
