= Zhaohua Temple =

Coordinates: 40.4628°N 114.4631°E

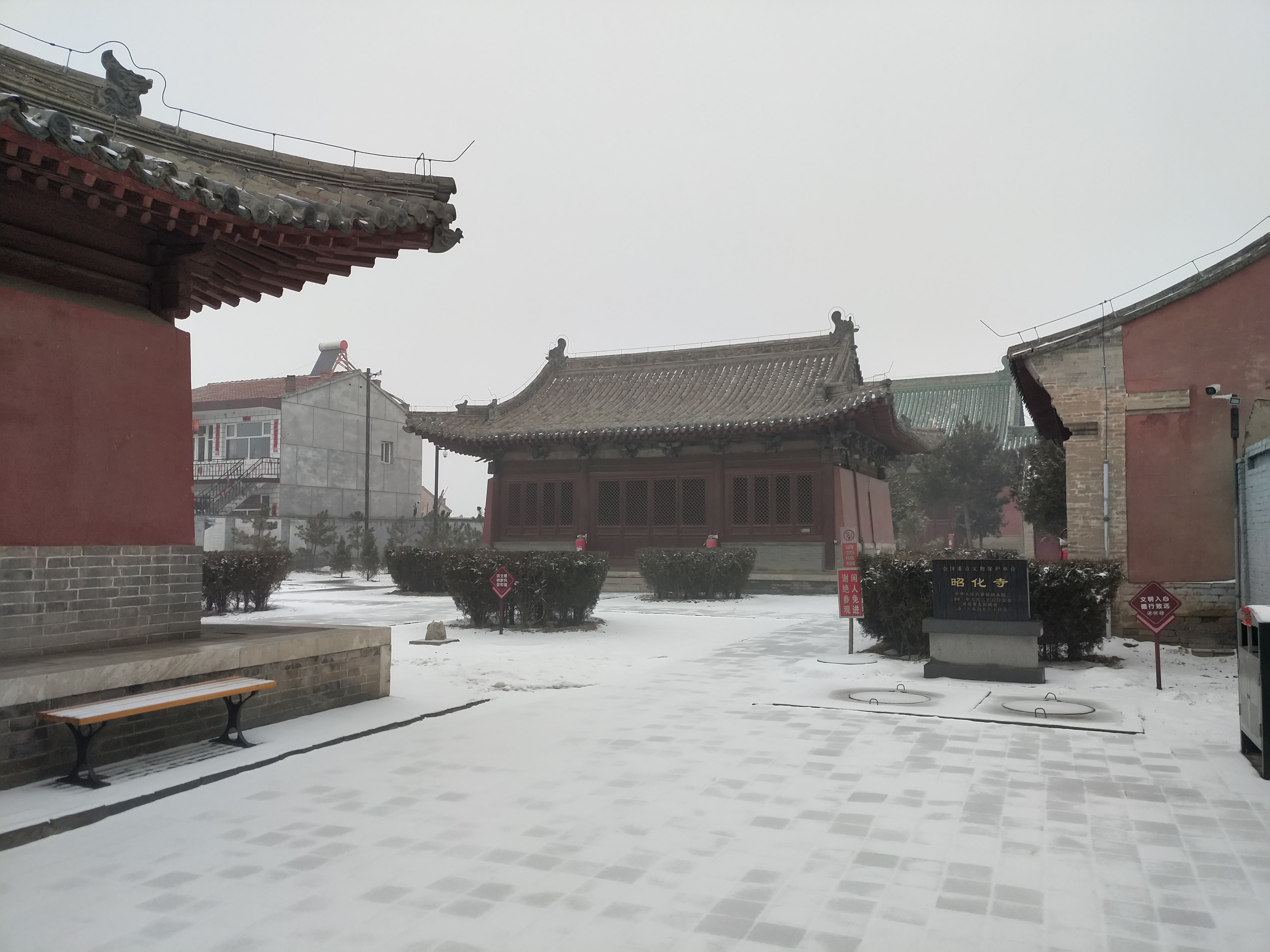

Religion
- Affiliation: Buddhist
- Province: Hebei
- Region: China
- Status: Preserved

Location
- Municipality: Zhangjiakou
- Interactive map of Zhaohua Temple

Architecture
- Completed: 1392

Zhaohua Temple (Chinese: 昭化寺; pinyin: Zhāohuà Sì) was originally constructed during the rule of the Ming dynasty, and was frequently used as a place for public celebration. Located in Huai'an, Zhangjiakou, Hebei Province, China, the Zhaohua Temple extends to over 3,820 square meters. The Temple has various rooms with a variety of functions. The Temple consists of the Mahavira Hall, several gates, bell, drum towers, and sacred halls where devotees can still worship the traditional Chinese gods. The temple is most famous for its frescoes, which are said to have been painted by the folk artist Rén Cháo (Chinese: 任朝). The frescoes cover more than 150 square meters of the temple and feature more than 500 different characters. They refer to almost all of the central gods in Buddhism and Taoism. The temple has been declared a state-protected cultural relic.

== History ==
Construction of the temple began in 1397 during the time of the Ming dynasty with expansion and rebuilding occurring during Ming Zheng Tong's reign (AD 1436). This expansion transformed the temple into a spectacular Buddhist shrine, and earned it the name "Zhaohua Temple" in recognition of its architectural and spiritual significance.

The structure is made from a combination of stone and brick, but also includes magnificent wooden structures. The various halls, such as King Hall, are richly decorated with glass tiles, ridges, cornices and even gold. Within the 248.5 square meters of the main hall of the Zhaohua Temple building are a number of vast paintings of armoured generals such as Qin Shubao of the Tang dynasty and Yuchi Gong. The rear wall of the Hall is over 36 square meters and painted with murals in the form of comics, vividly portraying characters from Buddhism, Taoism, Confucianism gods, and the human Empress Baiguan.

In 1930, a Norwegian painter discovered the Zhaohua Temple mural and made copies of all the murals.
