= Yongtong Bridge =

Single-hole circular arch bridge in China

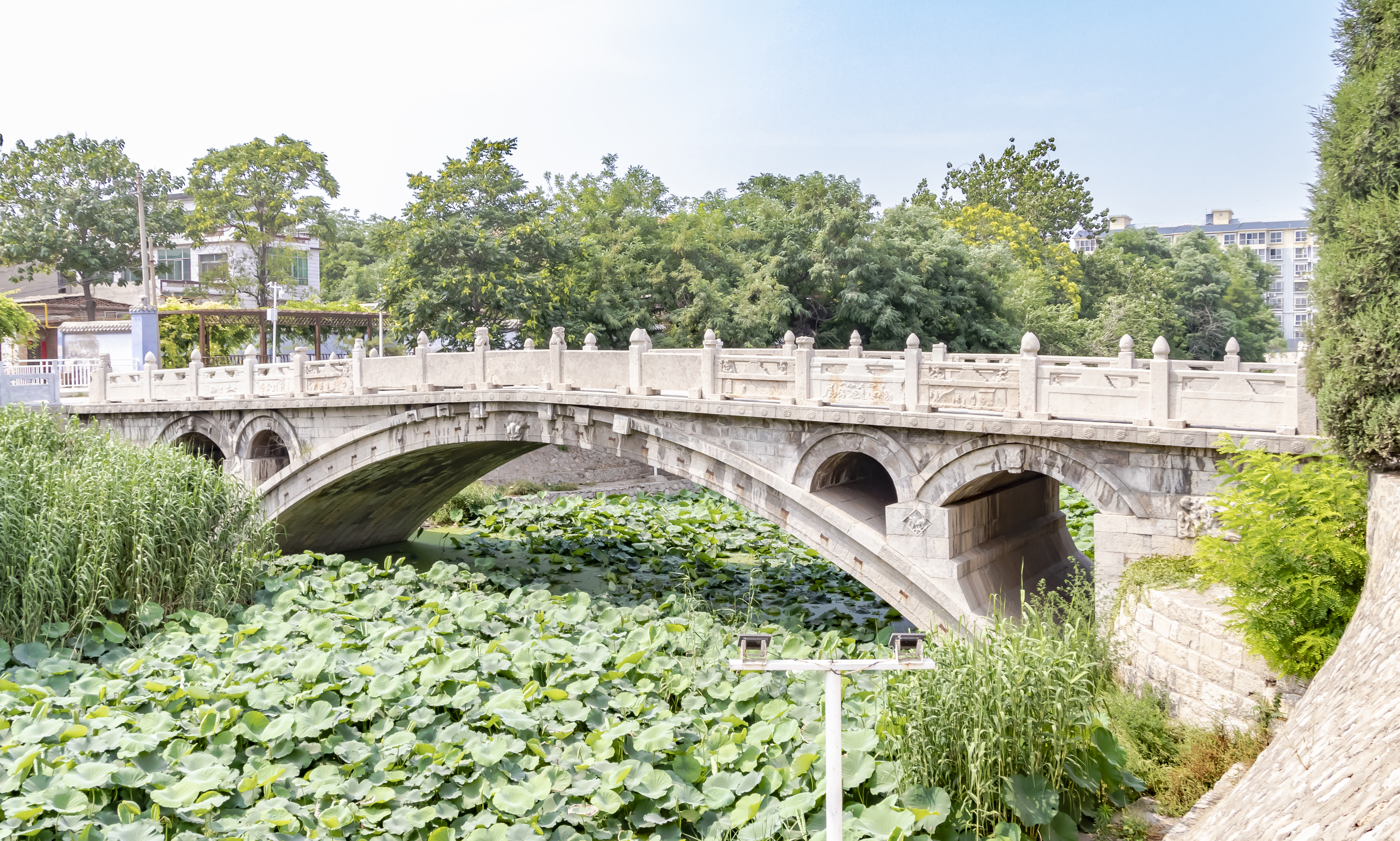
- Coordinates: 37°45′14″N 114°45′39″E
- Crosses: Qingshui River
- Locale: Zhao County, Hebei

History
- Construction start: 765

Yongtong Bridge (simplified Chinese: 永通桥; traditional Chinese: 永通橋), also known as Small Stone Bridge (小石桥), is an old single-hole circular arch bridge. It is located outside the west gate of Zhao County on the Ye River (冶河, now the Qingshui River).

== Construction times ==
Yongtong Bridge's construction date, due to the lack of original information, so there have been a variety of opinions. There is a view that it was built in the Mingchang period (明昌年间) of the Jin dynasty (1190–1196).

According to the bridge stone components and inscriptions excavated from under the Yongtong Bridge in 1986, the Bridge began construction in the early years of Yongtai (永泰) in the Tang dynasty (765).
