= Guoliang =

Guoliang may refer to the following Chinese names:

== places ==
town

- Guoliang, Chongqing (国梁镇), a town of Dazu District in Chongqing Municipality.

villages, written as "郭亮村"

- Guoliang Village (郭亮村), a village of Tongguan Subdistrict in Wangcheng District, Changsha City, Hunan Province.
- Guoliang, Huixian (郭亮村), a village in Huixian City, Henan Province.

other place

- Guoliang Tunnel (郭亮洞), a tunnel links the village of Guoliang, Huixian to the outside through the Taihang Mountains.

== names of people ==
names of Chinese people, written as "郭亮"

- see Guo Liang (disambiguation)
