= Huanglong River =

River in Hunan, China

Coordinates: 28°29′10″N 112°47′03″E

Huanglong River (Chinese: 黄龙河; pinyin: huánglóng hé), historically known as Zengzigang River (Chinese: 罾子港; pinyin: zēng-zǐ-gǎng), is a right-bank tributary of Xiang River in Wangcheng District and the northernmost one of right-bank tributaries in Changsha section of Xiang River in Hunan, China. It has a length of 10 kilometres (6.2 mi) with a rough drainage basin area of 50 square kilometres (19 sq mi). Huanglong River rises in Shiziling (Chinese: 狮子岭村) of Chating Town, flows through Shiziling, Yangjiaping (Chinese: 杨家坪村), Dongcheng and Dalong (Chinese: 大龙村) four villages of Chating Town and Huashi Village (Chinese: 花石村) of Tongguan Subdistrict, merging into Xiang River at Zengzigang Mouth (Chinese: 罾子港口) located between Dalong and Huashi villages.
