= Streptomyces plumbiresistens =

Scientific classification
- Domain: Bacteria
- Kingdom: Bacillati
- Phylum: Actinomycetota
- Class: Actinomycetes
- Order: Streptomycetales
- Family: Streptomycetaceae
- Genus: Streptomyces
- Species: S. plumbiresistens

Binomial name
- Streptomyces plumbiresistens Guo et al. 2009

Type strain
- ACCC 41207, CCNWHX 13-160, HAMBI 2991, JCM 16924

Synonyms
- Streptomyces resistoplumbeus

Species of bacterium

Streptomyces plumbiresistens is a bacterium species from the genus of Streptomyces which has been isolated from with lead contaminated soil in Huixian in the Gansu Province in China.

== See also ==
- List of Streptomyces species
