= Zhang Rongsuo =

Chinese politician

- Born: 1956 (age 69–70); Huixian, Henan, China
- Occupations: Politician, mining executive.
- Political party: Chinese Communist Party

Zhang Rongsuo (born 1956, Huixian) is a Chinese Communist Party member. He was a deputy to the 10th National People's Congress (2003 - 2008). Zhang has received accolades for his development of rural infrastructure and for being a hero to Chinese workers. In 2002, Zhang received an inaugural Touching China Annual Person of the Year Award. In private life, Zhang was active in the coal mining and transport industries.

== Personal life ==
Zhang was born in Huilong village, Huixian, Henan in 1956. He enlisted in the People's Liberation Army in 1975 and was discharged in 1980. Zhang gained wealth through his work in the coal mining and transportation industries.

== Public service ==
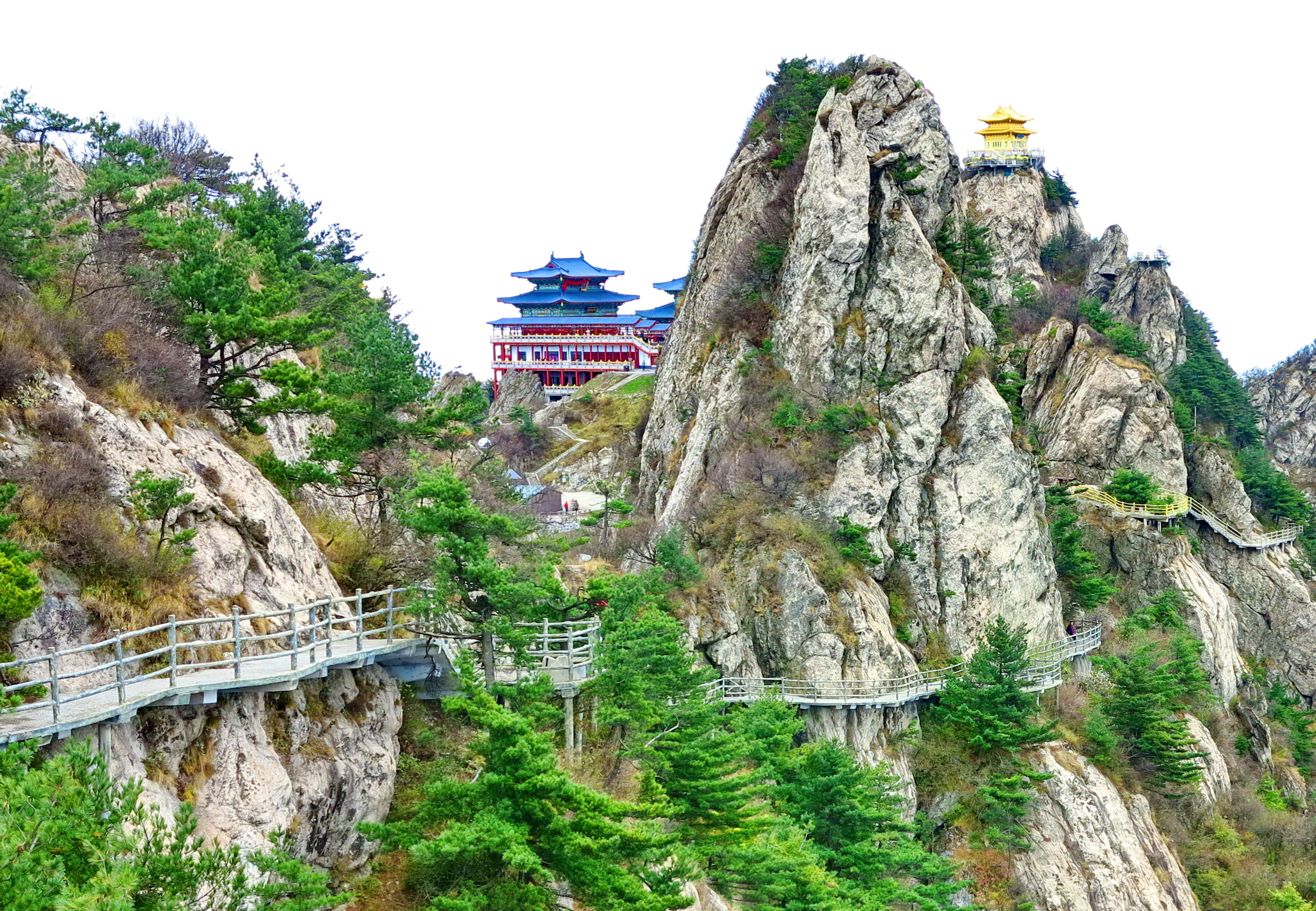
河南 老君山 栈道 - Laojun mountain plank road, an example of rugged terrain in Henan

Zhang became Party Secretary of Huilong village, Huixian in 1993. Due to the village's local terrain of high cliffs and mountains, electricity power supply to Huilong was delayed. Zhang organised local labor to install concrete power poles across 5 km of Laoyeding mountain at an altitude of 1,700 m. In February 1994, Huilong was connected to the power grid.

To improve the village's rocky land for agriculture, Zhang organised the development of approximately 1,500 acres of terraced farmland. By 1997, approximately 35,000 fruit trees were planted. Zhang contributed to the funding of a new road to the village which was completed in January 2001.

For his work, Zhang received an inaugural Touching China award in 2002. The commendation read, "He had already acquired wealth, but he still cared for the villagers living in poverty. He had already left the mountains, but he wanted all his fellow villagers to escape their isolation. He accomplished a dream that had been impossible for generations. With the persistence and courage of 'The Foolish Old Man Who Moved the Mountains,' he carved a road into the cliffs, opening a path to the outside world for his fellow villagers and, more importantly, a gateway of hope in their hearts. He ended an era of poverty and created a new way of life."

In 2003, Zhang was elected to the National People's Congress. Further accolades followed with recognition as a National Workers' Hero in 2005 and as an Outstanding Party Member in 2006. However, a news report was made in August 2006 that alleged Zhang was present at the site of an altercation in the Balinggou Scenic Area in Xinxiang.
