= Hongzhou Township =

Township in Huixian, Henan, China

Coordinates: 35.5350°N 113.6808°E

Hongzhou (Chinese: 洪洲乡) is a township in Huixian, Henan, China.
