= Mount Xiaowutai =

Mountain in Hebei, China

Highest point
- Elevation: 2,882 m (9,455 ft)
- Prominence: 1,519 m (4,984 ft)
- Listing: Ultra
- Coordinates: 39°56′29″N 115°2′35″E

Geography
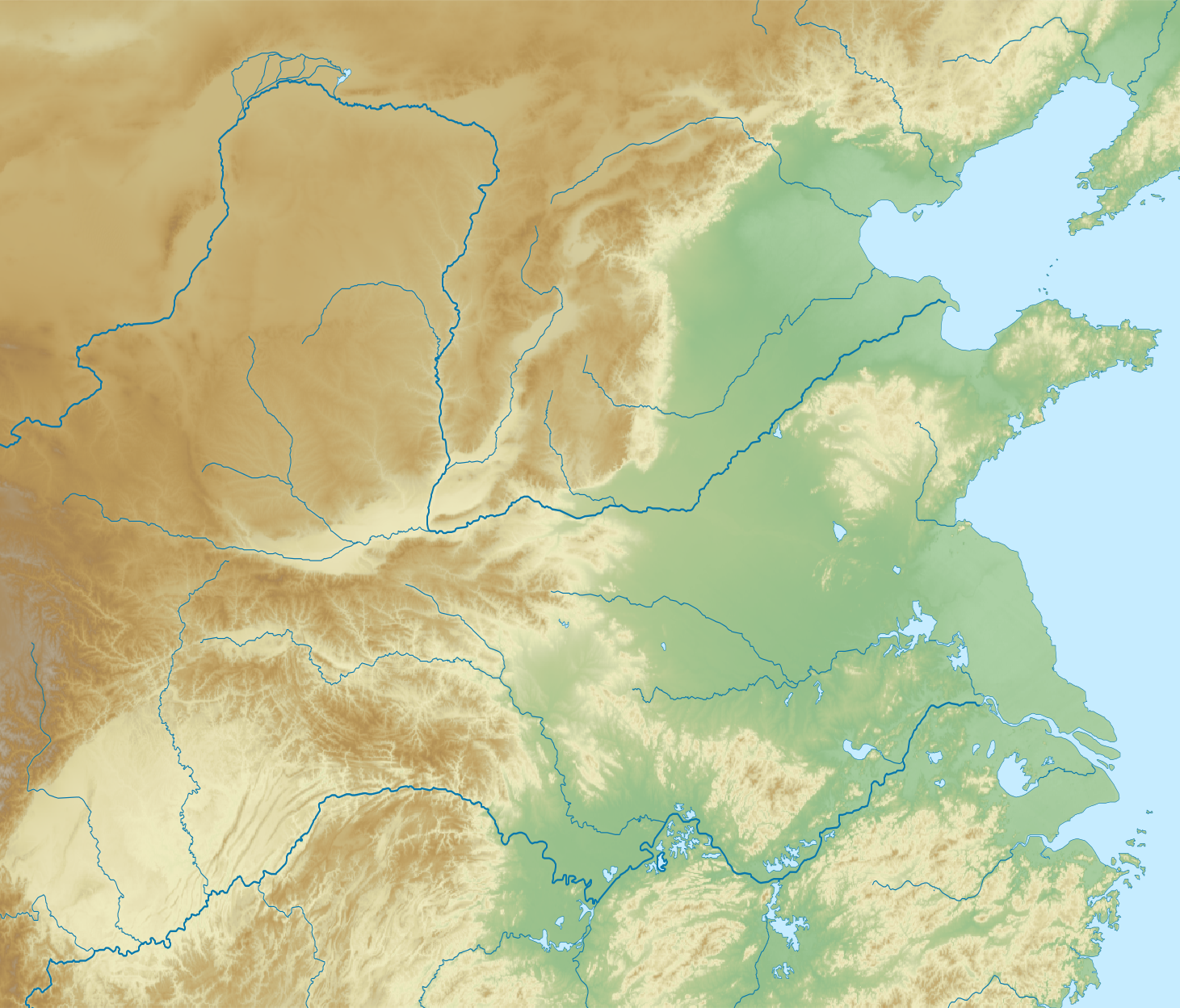
- Location within Hebei Location within Northern China Location within China
- Location: Yu County, Hebei, China
- Parent range: Taihang Mountains

Mount Xiaowutai (Chinese: 小五台山; pinyin: Xiǎowǔtái Shān; lit. 'little Wutai') is a mountain located in Yu County in the northwest of the province of Hebei, China. With an altitude of 2,882 m (9,455 ft), it is the highest point in Hebei and the Taihang Mountains.

== See also ==
- List of ultras of Tibet, East Asia and neighbouring areas
