= Guo Liang (leader of labour movement) =

Guo Liang (Chinese: 郭亮; December 3, 1901, in Wenjiaba, Tongguan, Changsha – March 29, 1928) was a communist, one of famous leaders of the early worker's movement in Hunan. Guo was Mao Zedong's revolutionary follower and was killed by the Hunan Kuomintang authority on March 29, 1928.

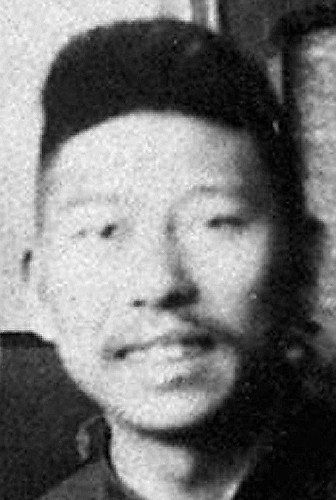
Portrait of Guo Liang

== Career ==
Guo entered into the First Normal School of Hunan (湖南一师范) to study in 1920. When Mao Zedong served as a school officer of the affiliated primary school (附小主事) in First Normal School (一师范), Guo turned to Mao for advice and he had a close relationship with Mao. Guo joined in the Xinmin Institute (新民学会) by Mao's recommendation in 1920 and became a CPC member while Mao was as his referrer in 1921. He studied at the Hunan Self-Study University founded by Mao Zedong.

At that time he was ready to go to Yueyang and organize an armed uprising, Guo was betrayed by traitors and arrested on March 27. the next day he was sent to Changsha, and was killed by decapitation of Kuomintang authority on March 29. after his death, his head was as a warning sign hung for three 3 days at Simenkou (司门口), also hung for three 3 days at Dongshansi (东山寺) of Tongguan.
