= Guoliang Tunnel =

Mountain tunnel in Henan, China

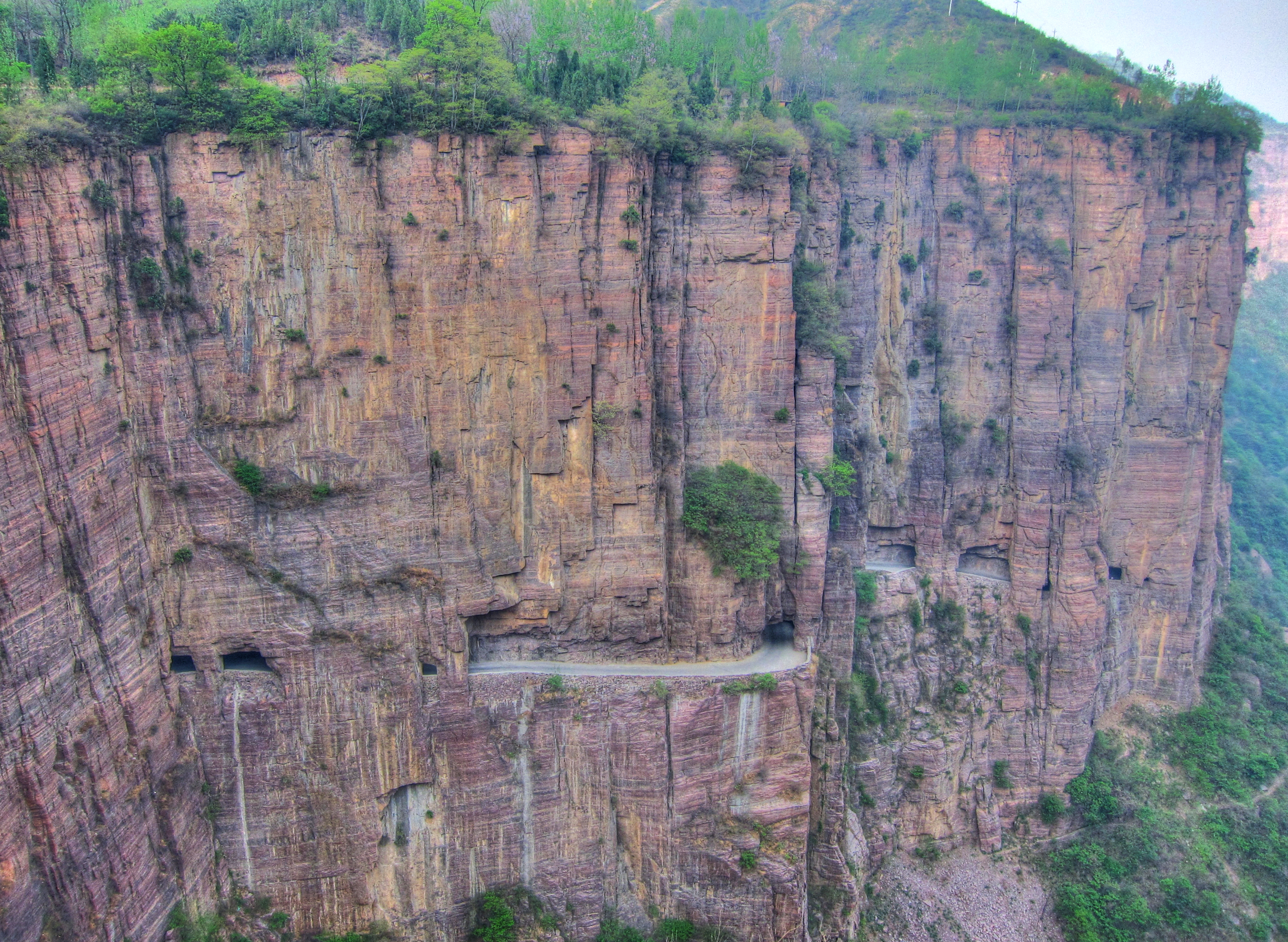
- Guoliang tunnel road
- Interactive map of Guoliang Tunnel

Overview
- Location: Huixian, Xinxiang, Henan Province
- Coordinates: 35°43′51.96″N 113°36′14.4″E

Operation
- Opened: May 1, 1977; 48 years ago

Technical
- Length: 1.25 kilometres (0.78 mi)
- No. of lanes: 1
- Tunnel clearance: 16 feet (4.9 m)
- Width: 13 feet (4.0 m)

The Guoliang Tunnel (Chinese: 郭亮洞) is carved along the side of and through a mountain in China. The tunnel links the village of Guoliang to the outside through the Taihang Mountains which are situated in Huixian, Xinxiang, Henan Province of China.

== History ==
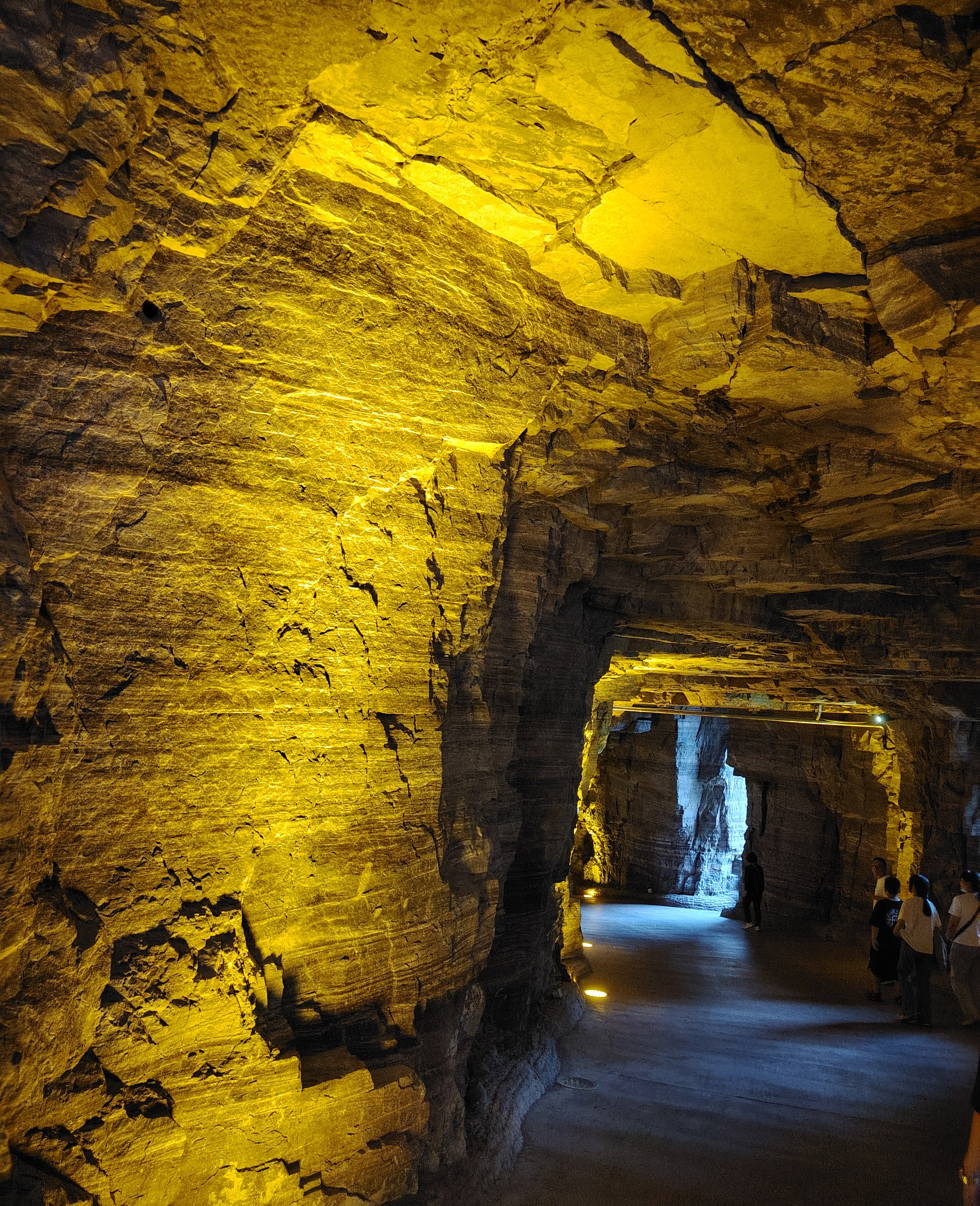
Interior of Guoliang Tunnel in Huixian, Henan

The village was named after a fugitive rebel during the Han dynasty, who had fought an overwhelming imperial force to a standstill utilizing the extreme local terrain. Before the tunnel was constructed, access to the nearby village of Guoliang Village was restricted to a difficult path carved into the mountainside. The village is nestled in a valley surrounded by towering mountains cut off from outside civilization.

To ease the villagers' access to outside world, a group of villagers led by Shen Mingxin made plans in 1972 to carve a road into the side of the mountain. They sold their livestock to raise funds to buy tools and materials. Thirteen villagers began the project, with one dying during construction. Without access to power tools, they undertook construction mostly with hammers and chisels. At the most difficult stage, the tunnel progressed at a rate of one metre every three days. It is 1.2 kilometres (0.75 mi) long, 5 metres (16 ft) tall and 4 metres (13 ft) wide.

The tunnel opened to traffic on 1 May 1977. Its creation has turned the village into a tourist attraction. The area has also been used as a film location.

== See also ==
- Yungas Road, a dangerous road in Bolivia nicknamed the "Death Road".
