= Guo Liang =

Guo Liang may refer to:

- Guo Liang (actor) (born 1968), Chinese-born Singaporean actor and television host
- Guo Liang (cyclist) (born 1998), Chinese cyclist
- Guo Liang (footballer) (born 1985), Chinese footballer
- Guo Liang (leader of labour movement) (1901–1928)
