= Taihang Mountains =

Mountain range in northern China

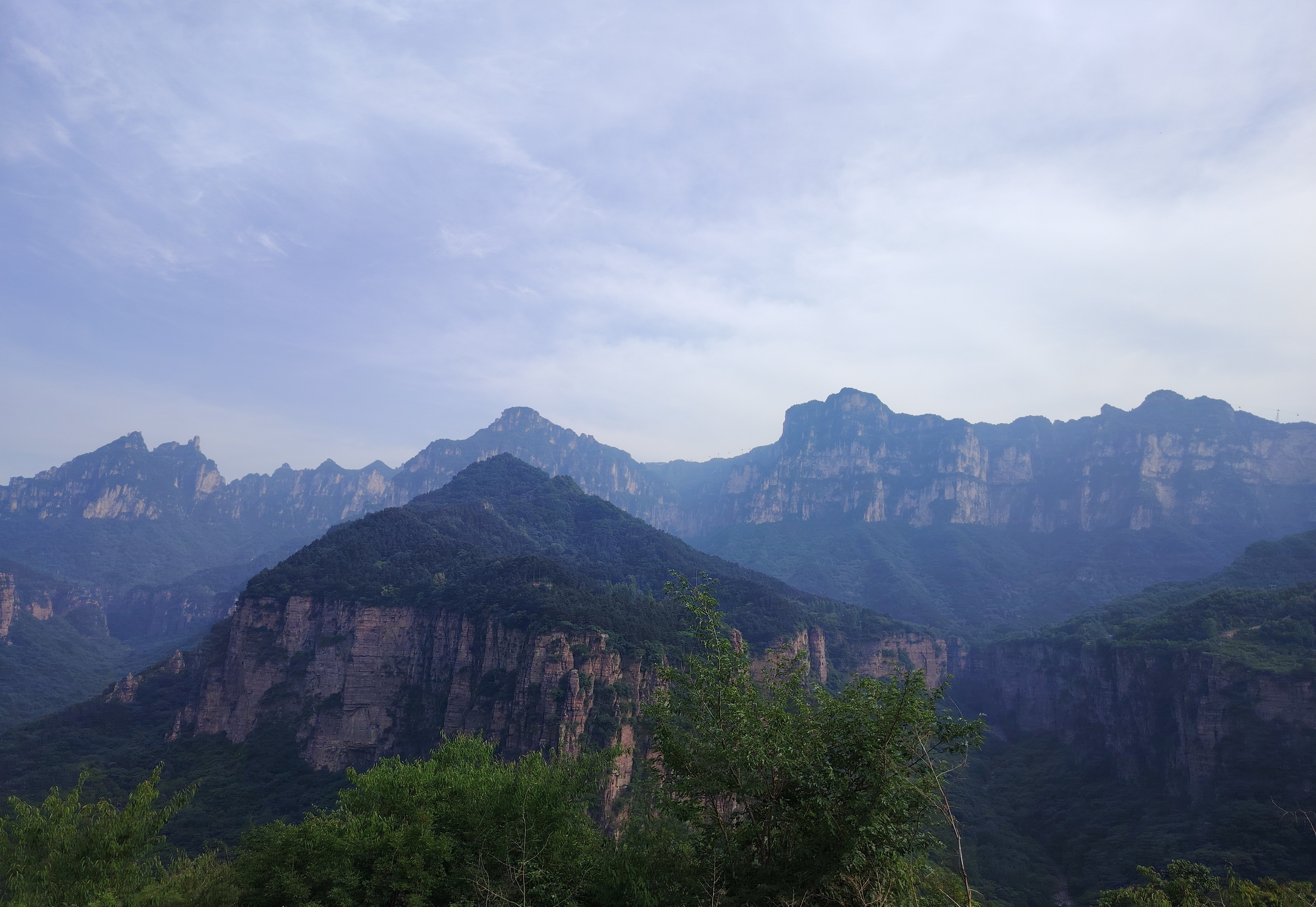
- Taihang Mountains in Huixian, Henan

Highest point
- Peak: Mount Xiaowutai
- Elevation: 2,882 m (9,455 ft)

Dimensions
- Length: 400 km (250 mi)

Naming
- Native name: 太行山 (Chinese)

Geography
- Location within Northern China Location within China
- Country: China
- Provinces: Shanxi; Henan; Hebei
- Range coordinates: 38°N 113°E

The Taihang Mountains (Chinese: 太行山; pinyin: Tàiháng Shān) are a Chinese mountain range running down the eastern edge of the Loess Plateau in Shanxi, Henan and Hebei provinces. The range extends over 400 kilometers (250 mi) from north to south and has an average elevation of 1,500 to 2,000 m (4,900 to 6,600 ft); its principal peak is Mount Xiaowutai. The Taihang's eastern peak is Mount Cangyan in Hebei; Baishi Mountain forms its northern tip.

== History ==
- 185 rebels of the Yellow Turban are defeated by the imperial army, but only two months later, the rebellion breaks out again. It spreads to the Taihang Mountains on the western border of Hebei Province.
- During the Second Sino-Japanese War, the Taihang Mountains were the site of a successful ambush against Japanese troops by the Eighth Route Army in Huangtuling.

== Background ==
The Taihang Mountains were formed during the Jurassic. Brown forest and Cinnamon soils are found here.

The name of Shanxi Province, meaning "west of the mountains", derives from its location west of the Taihang Mountains. The name of Shandong Province (east of the mountains) originally applied to the area east of the Xiao Mountains, but by the Tang dynasty it refers to the area east of the Taihang Mountains; this entity evolved into the modern-day Shandong Province, though the actual border of the province has moved considerably to the east.

The Hai River system runs through the Taihang Mountains. The Red Flag Canal is located on the south edge of the Taihang Mountains.

The Shijiazhuang–Taiyuan high-speed railway crosses under the Taihang Mountains via the Taihang Tunnel, the third longest rail tunnel in China.

== Gallery ==
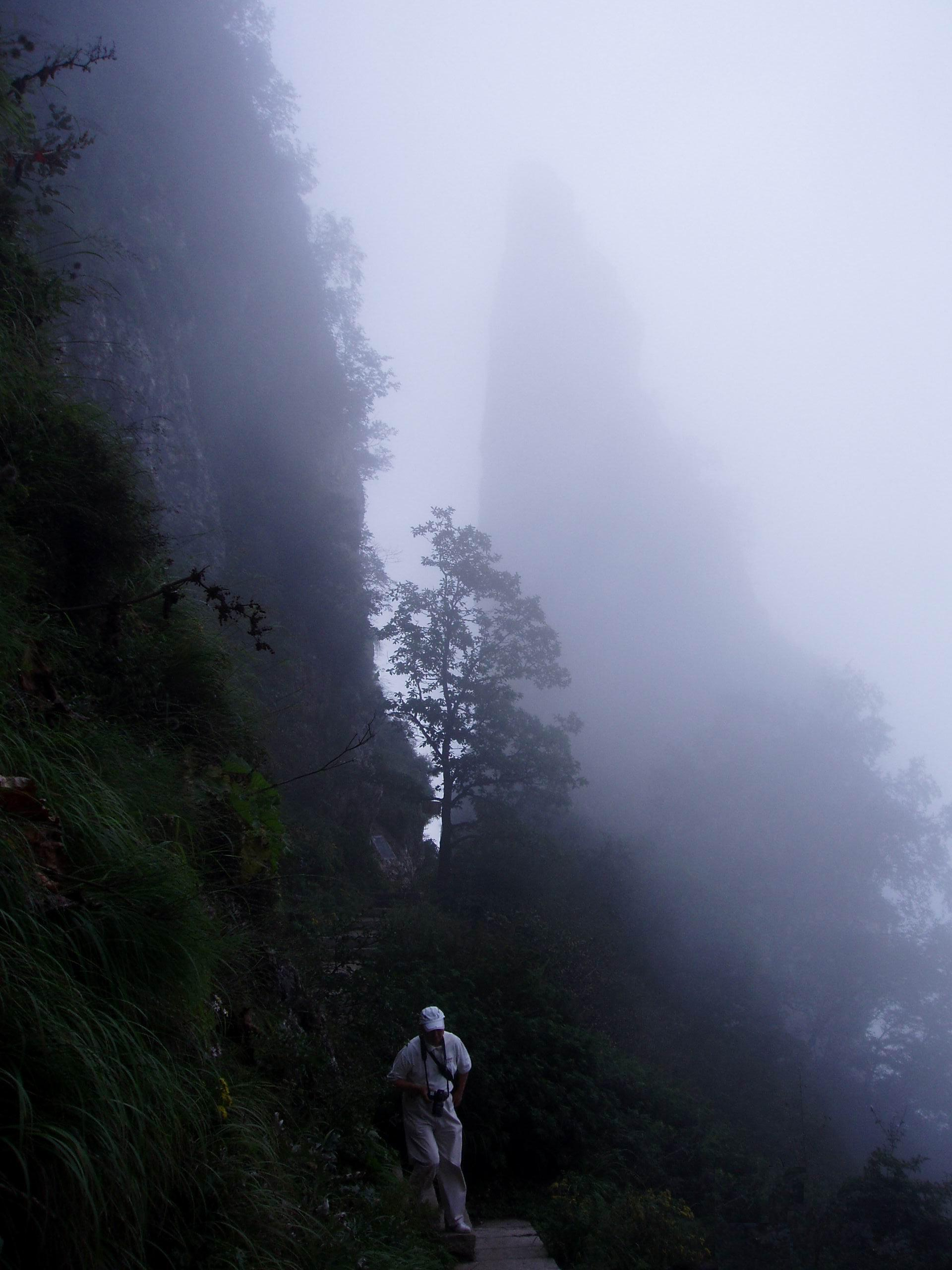
Taihang in Hebei

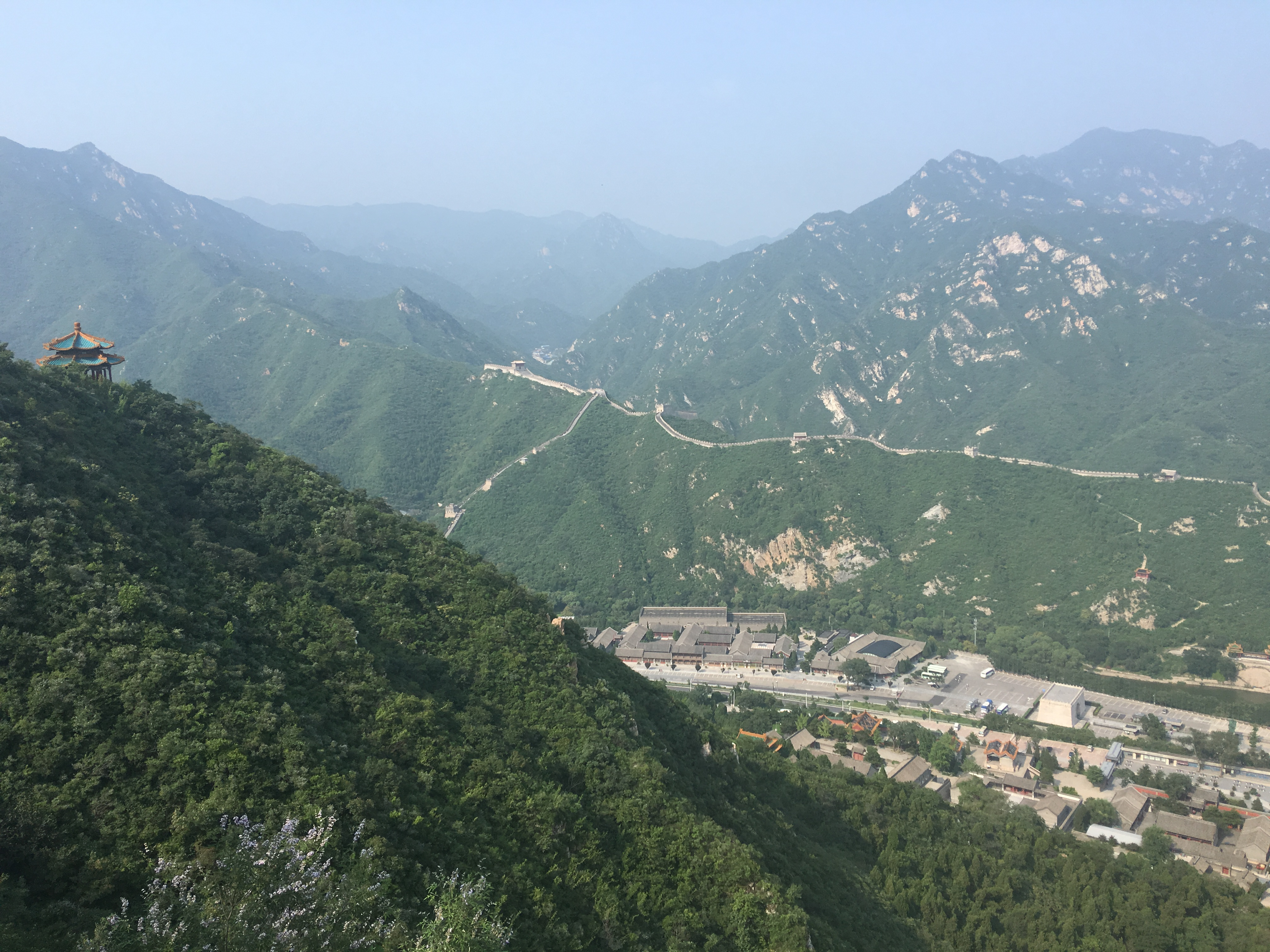
Taihang in Changping, Beijing

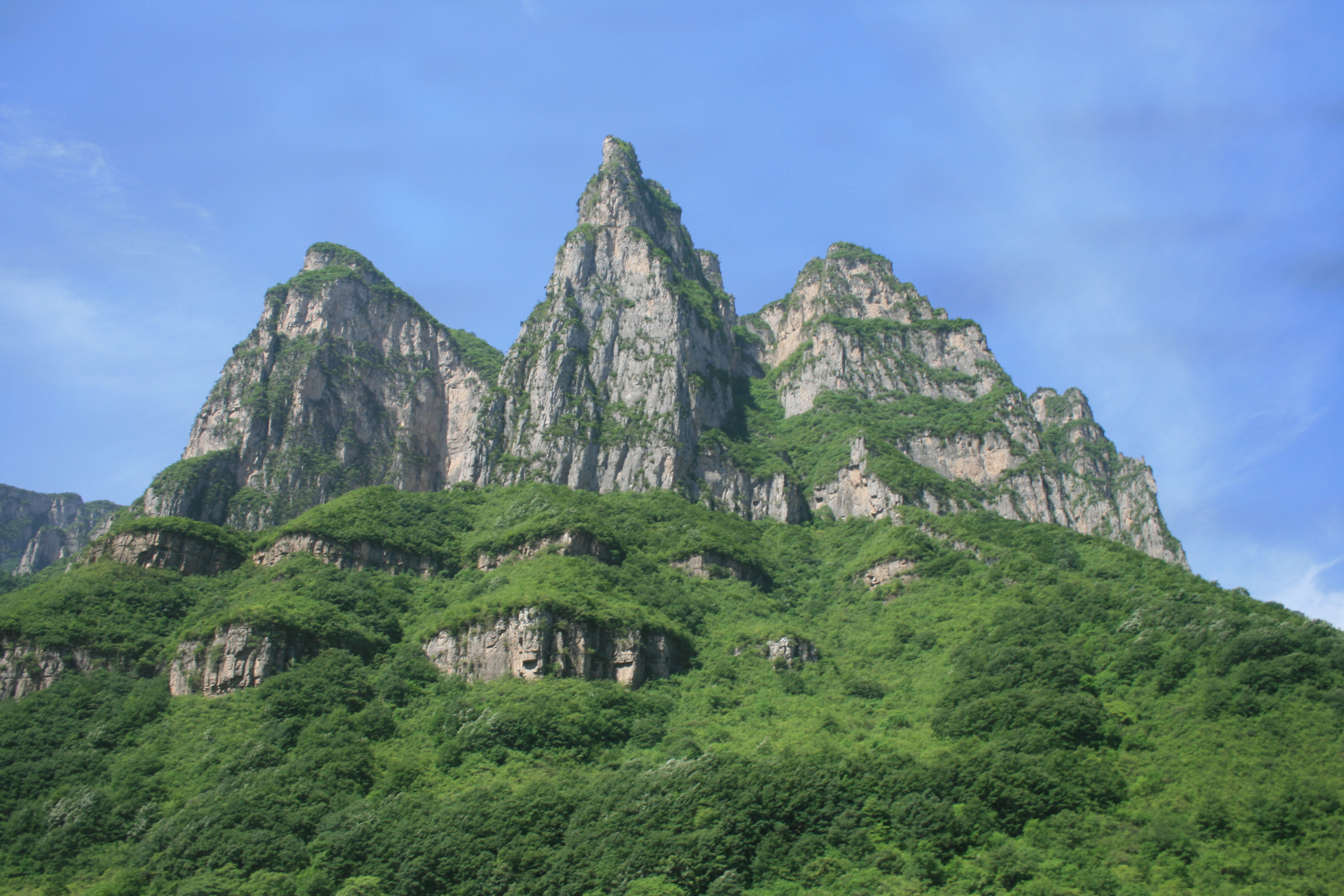
Yuntai Mountain, Jiaozuo, Henan

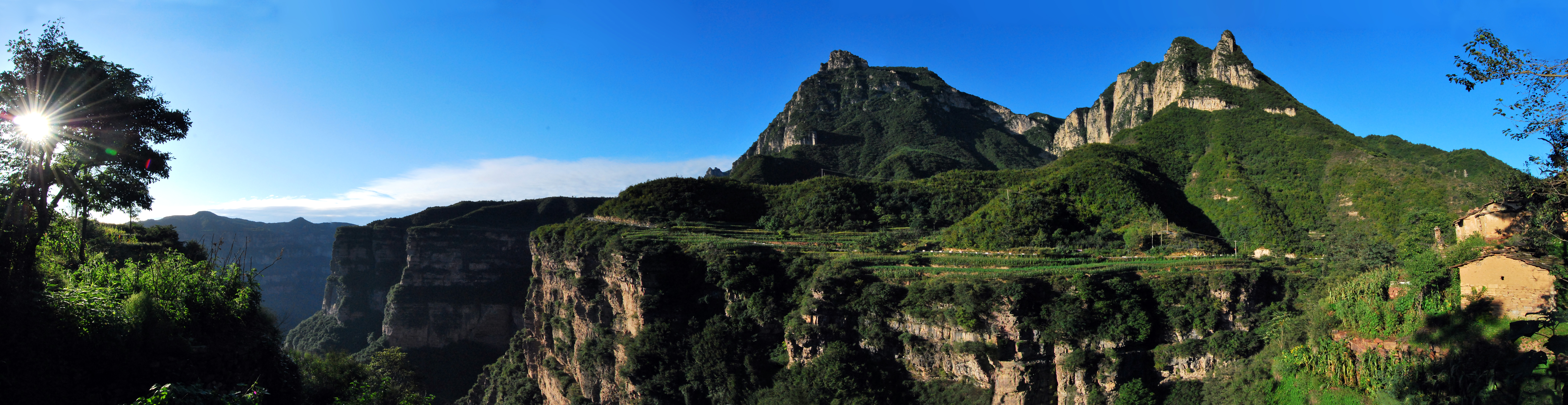
Scenery of Taihang Mountain

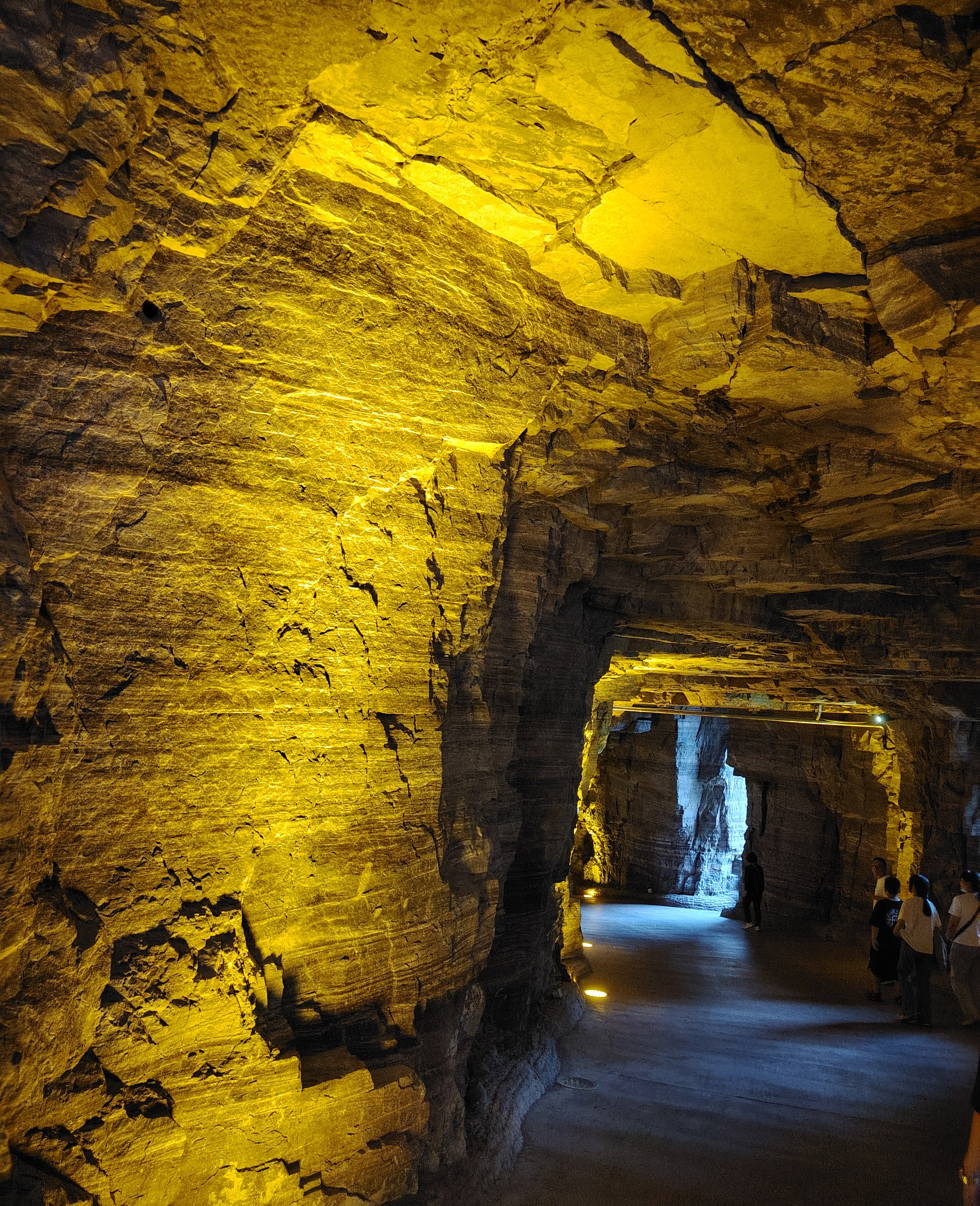
Guoliang Tunnel in Huixian, Henan

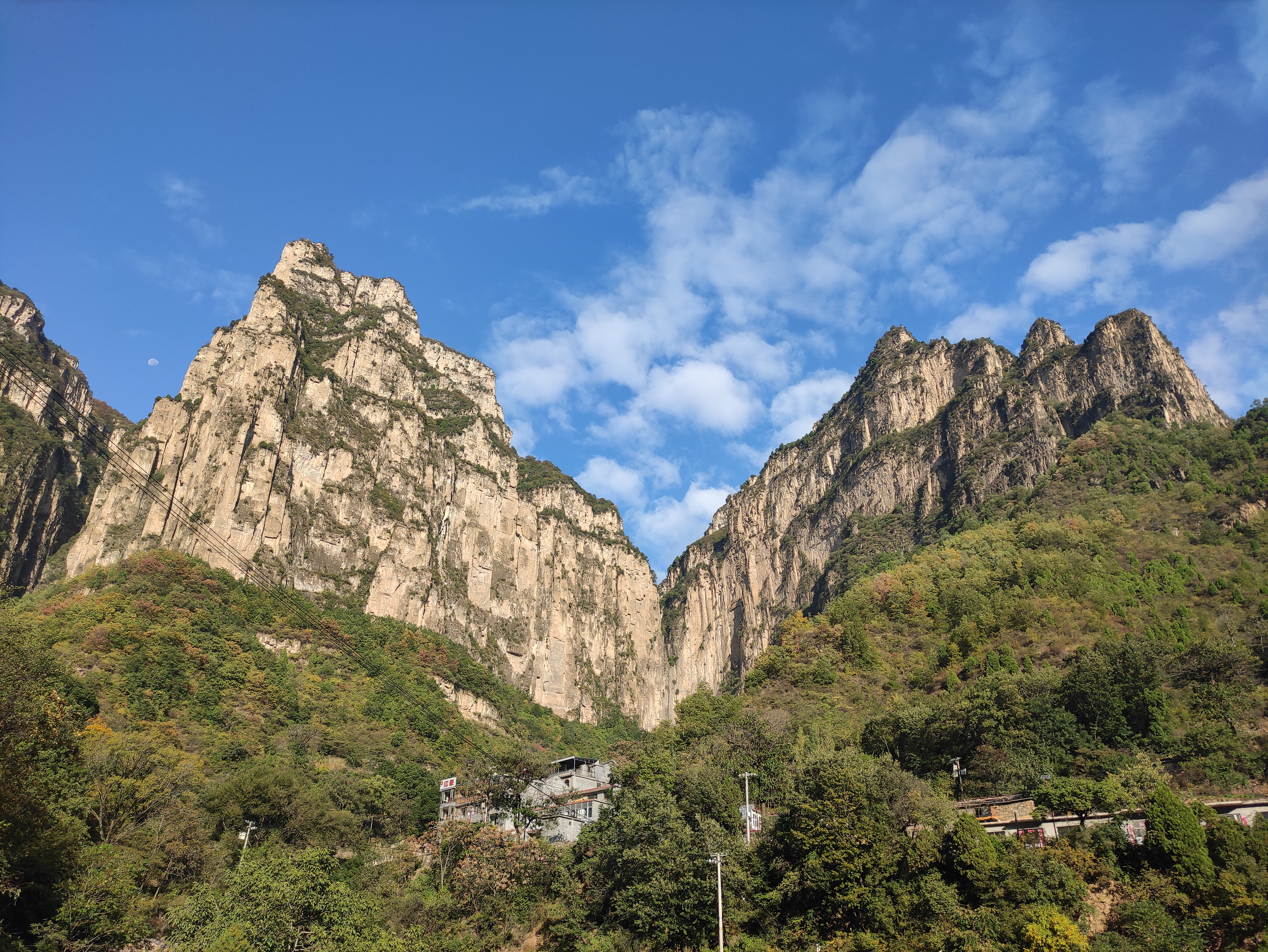
Taihang Mountains in Pingshun, Shanxi

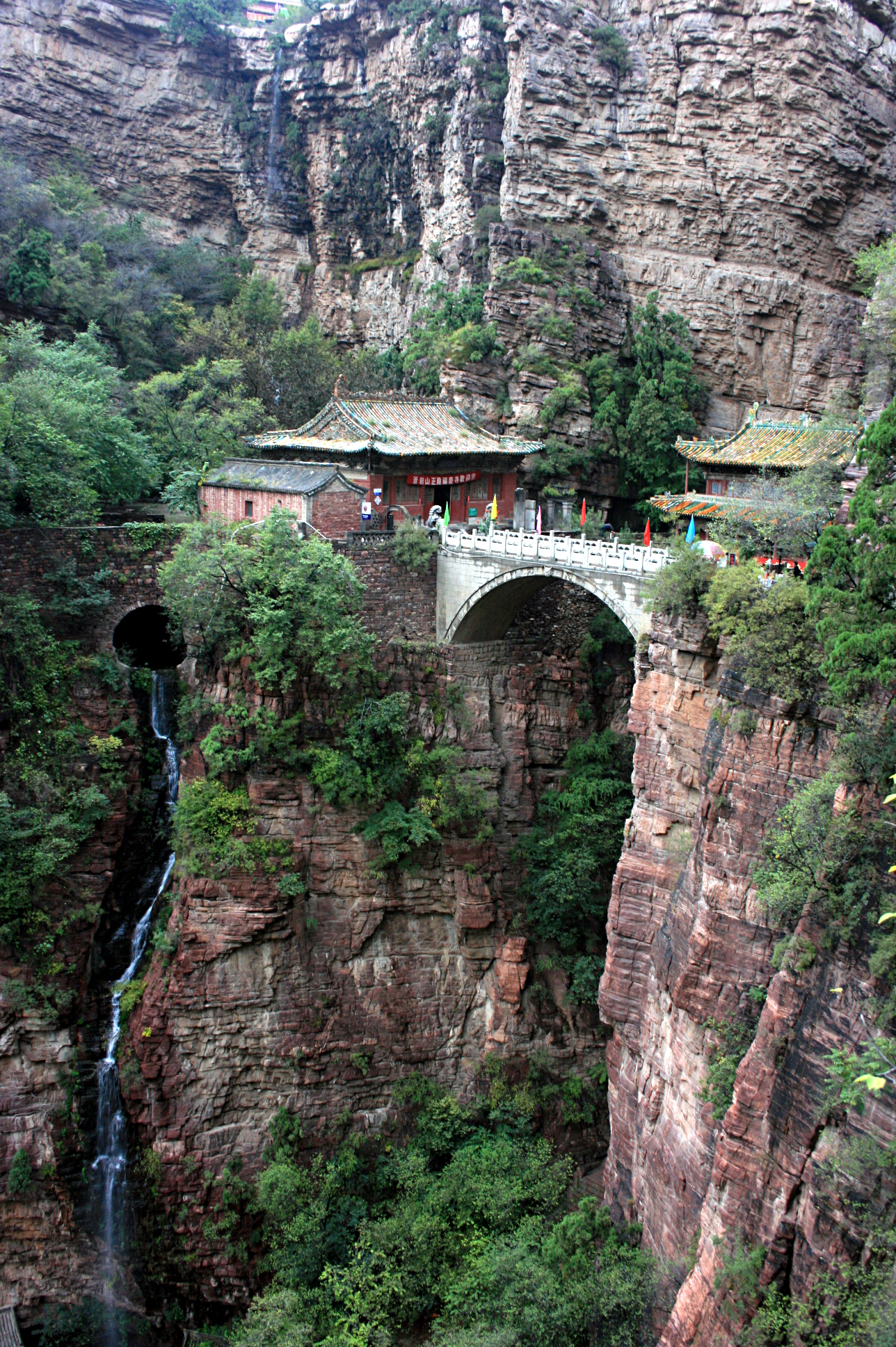
Mount Cangyan

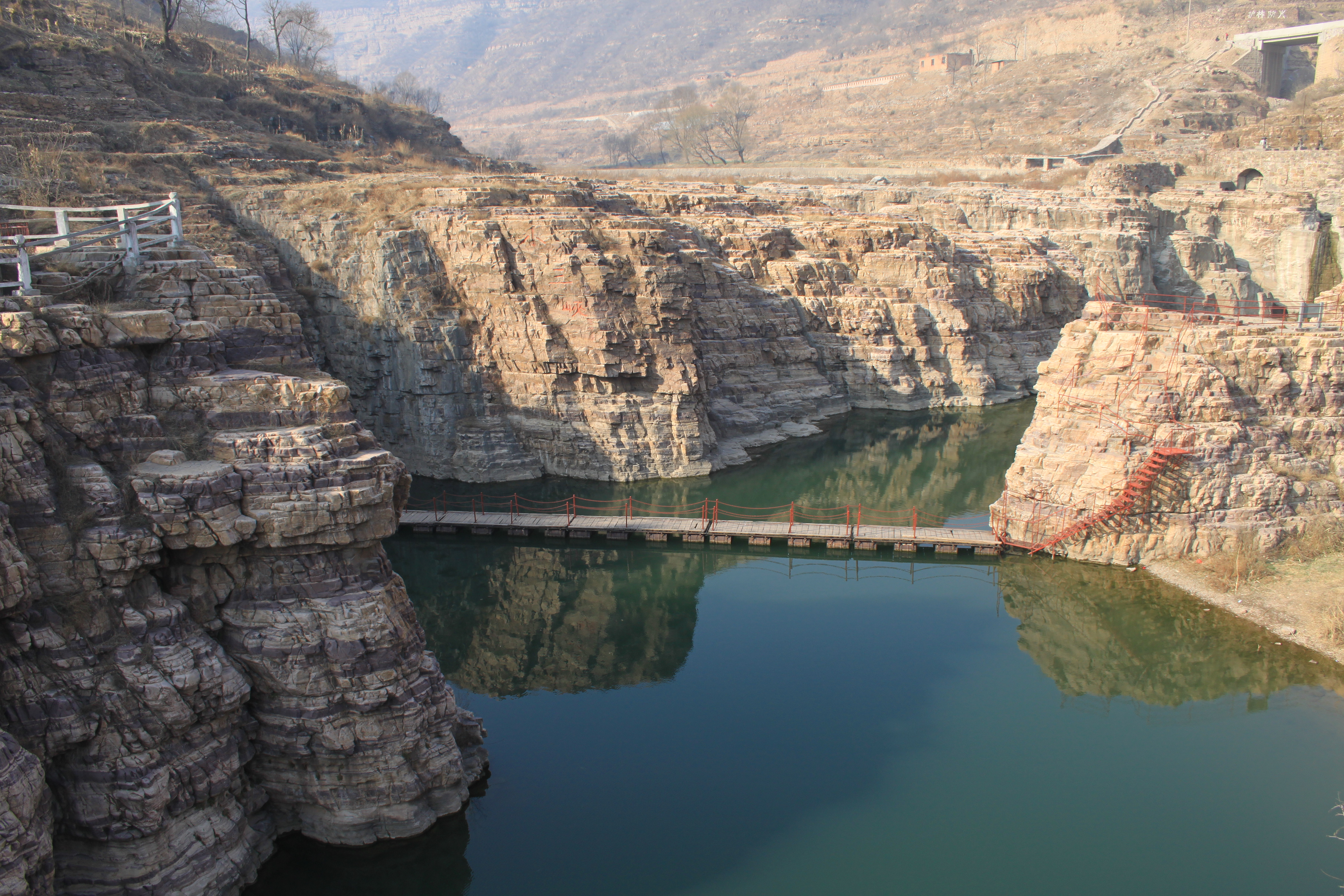
Red Flag Canal

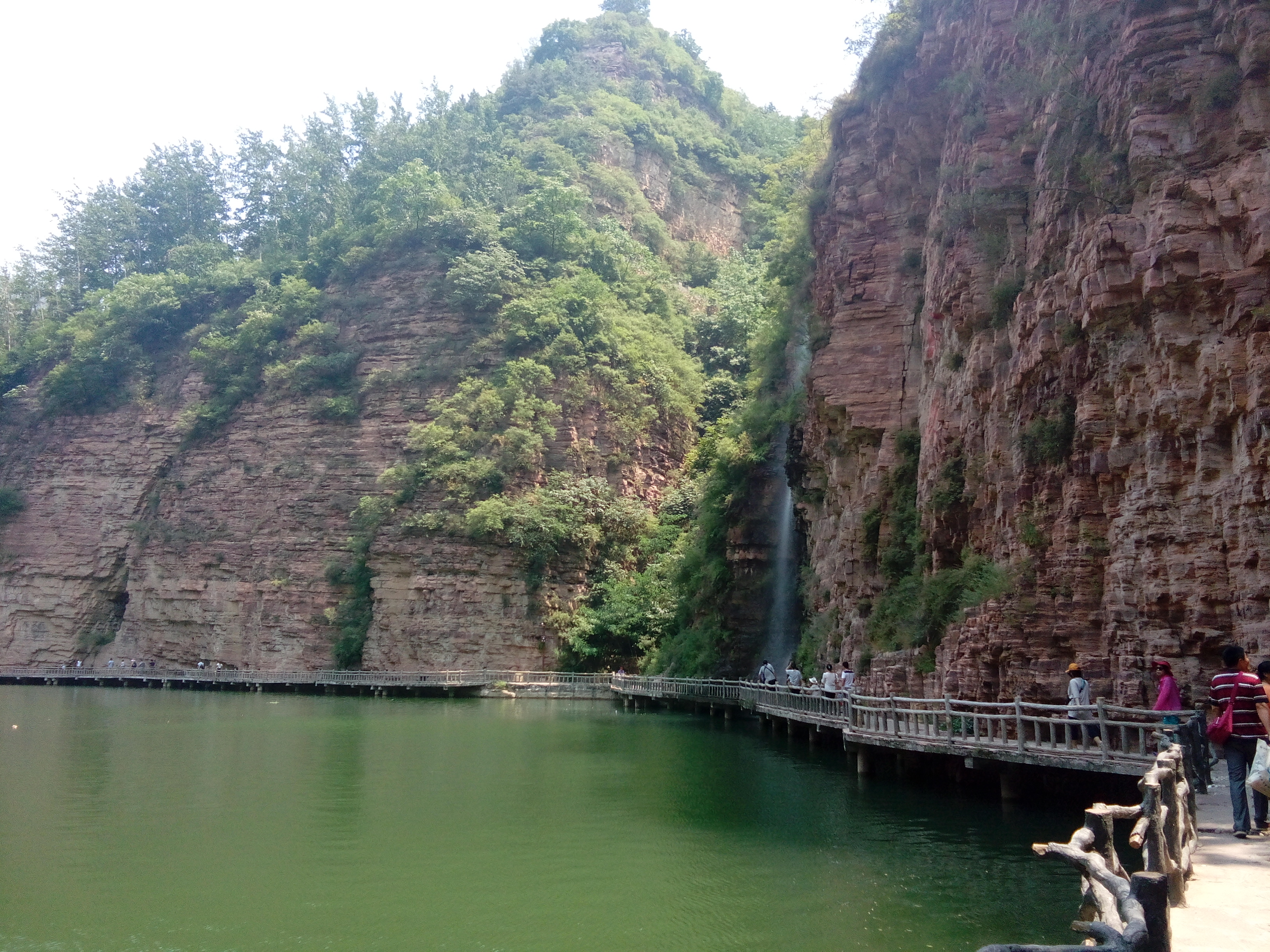
Mount Qibugou

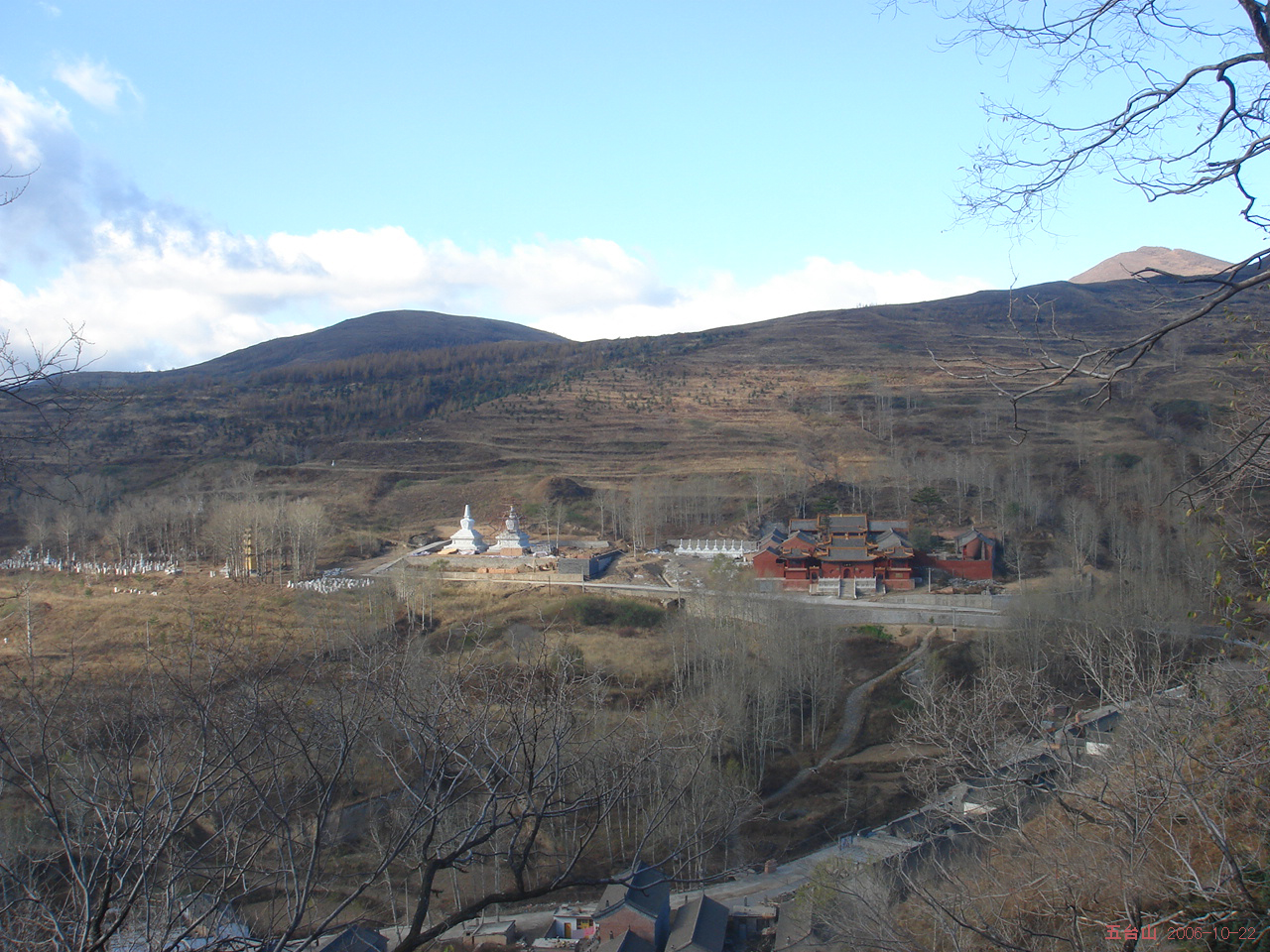
Mount Wutai

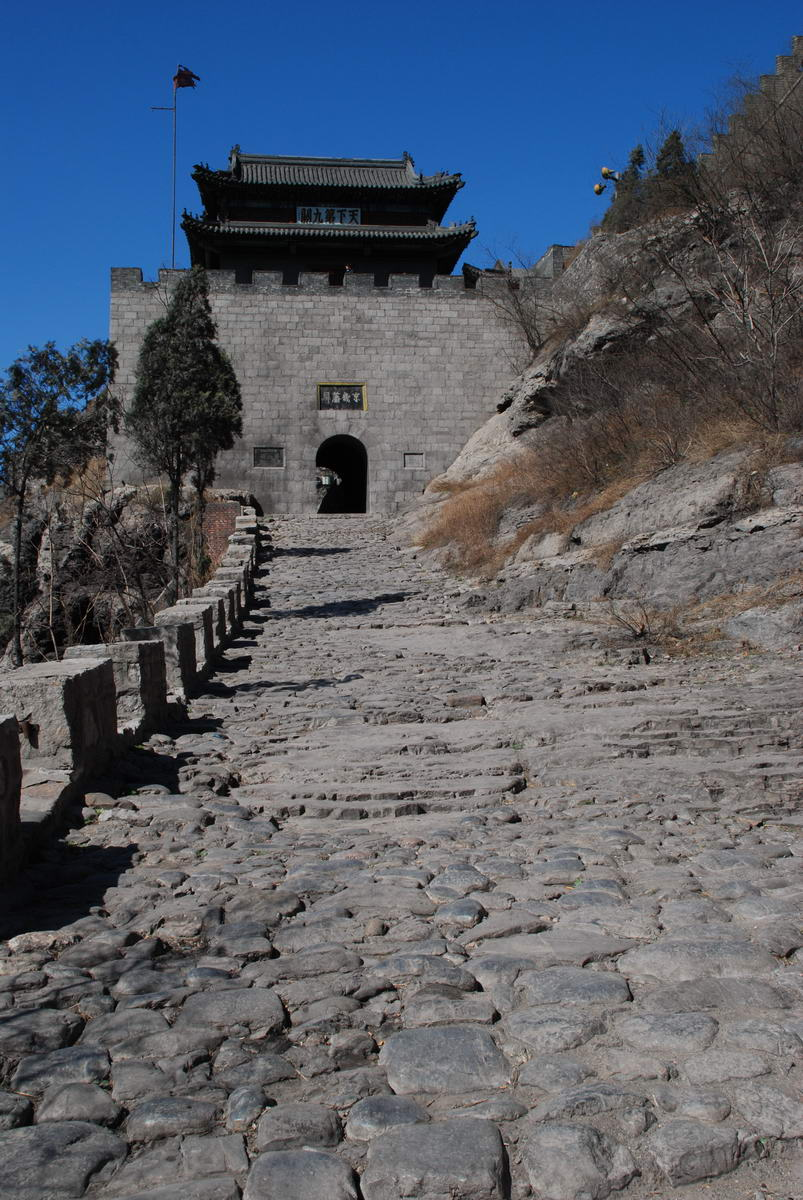
Niangziguan

== See also ==
- The Foolish Old Man Removes the Mountains (Chinese: 愚公移山), One of the two mountains mentioned in the ancient Chinese myth, the other is Mount Wangwu.
- Taihangshan Gorge of China
- Guoliang Tunnel
