= Guoliang Village =

Guoliang 郭亮村
- Village
- Location in Hunan
- Coordinates: 28°27′01″N 112°50′52″E
- Village: People's Republic of China
- Province: Hunan
- Prefecture-level city: Changsha
- District: Wangcheng
- Subdistrict: Tongguan

Area
  - Total: 9.1 km^{2} (3.5 sq mi)

Population
  - Total: 3,899
  - Density: 430/km^{2} (1,100/sq mi)
- Time zone: UTC+8 (China Standard)

Guoliang (Chinese: 郭亮村; pinyin: Guōliàng Cūn) is a village of Tongguan Subdistrict in Wangcheng District, Changsha City, Hunan Province, China. The village has an area of 9.1 km^{2} (3.5 sq mi) with rough population of 3,899 in 2016 and it was divided into 37 villagers' groups. The village is named after the worker's movement leader Guo Liang.

The Guoliang Tunnel connects the village to the outside world.
