= Chating, Changsha =

Chating 茶亭镇
- Town
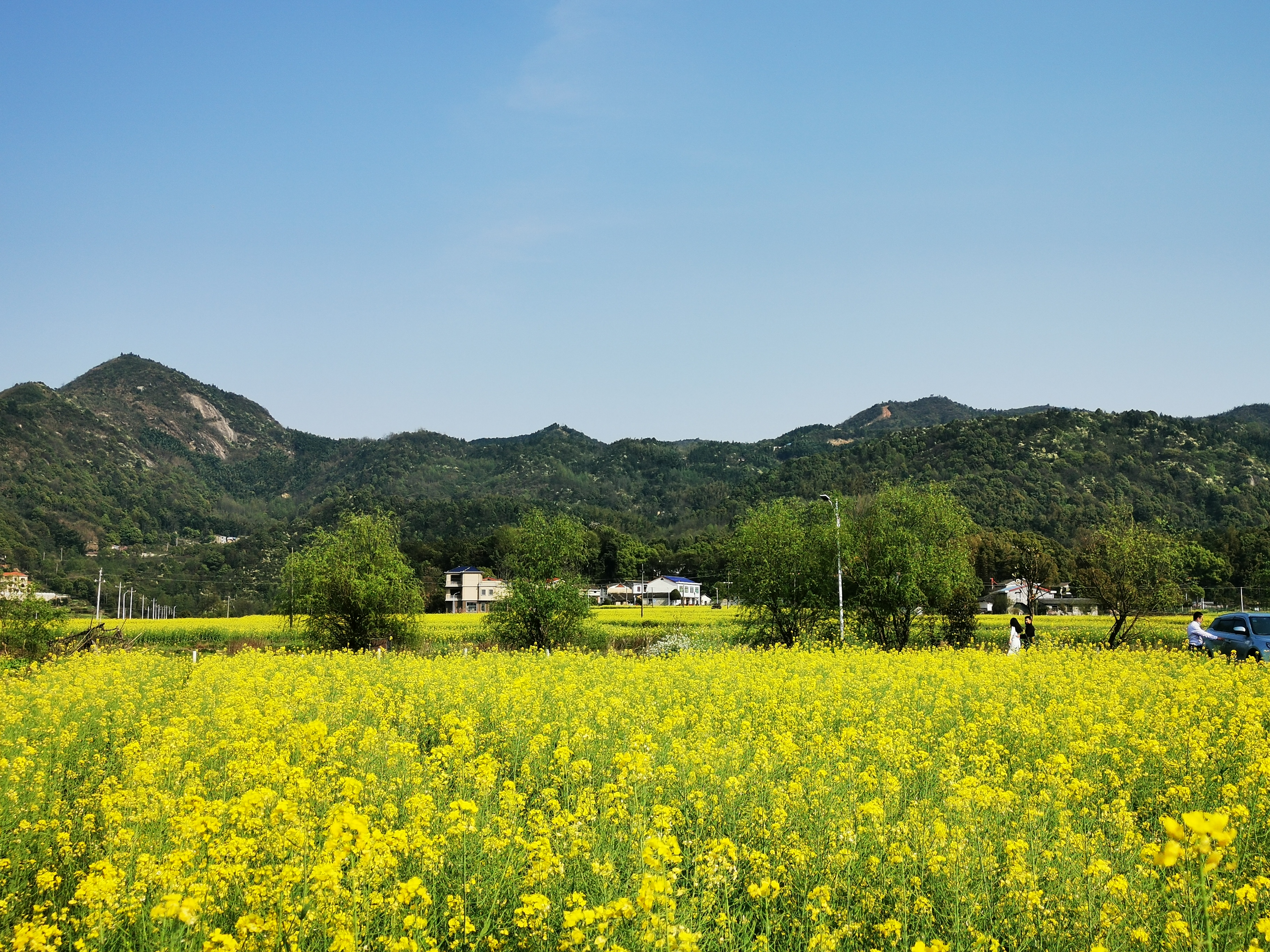

- Location in Hunan
- Coordinates: 28°30′06″N 112°56′07″E
- Country: People's Republic of China
- Province: Hunan
- Prefecture-level city: Changsha
- District: Wangcheng District

Area
  - Total: 135 km^{2} (52 sq mi)

Population
  - Total: 54,000
  - Density: 400/km^{2} (1,000/sq mi)
- 2014
- Time zone: UTC+08:00 (China Standard)
- Postal code: 410204
- Area code: 0731

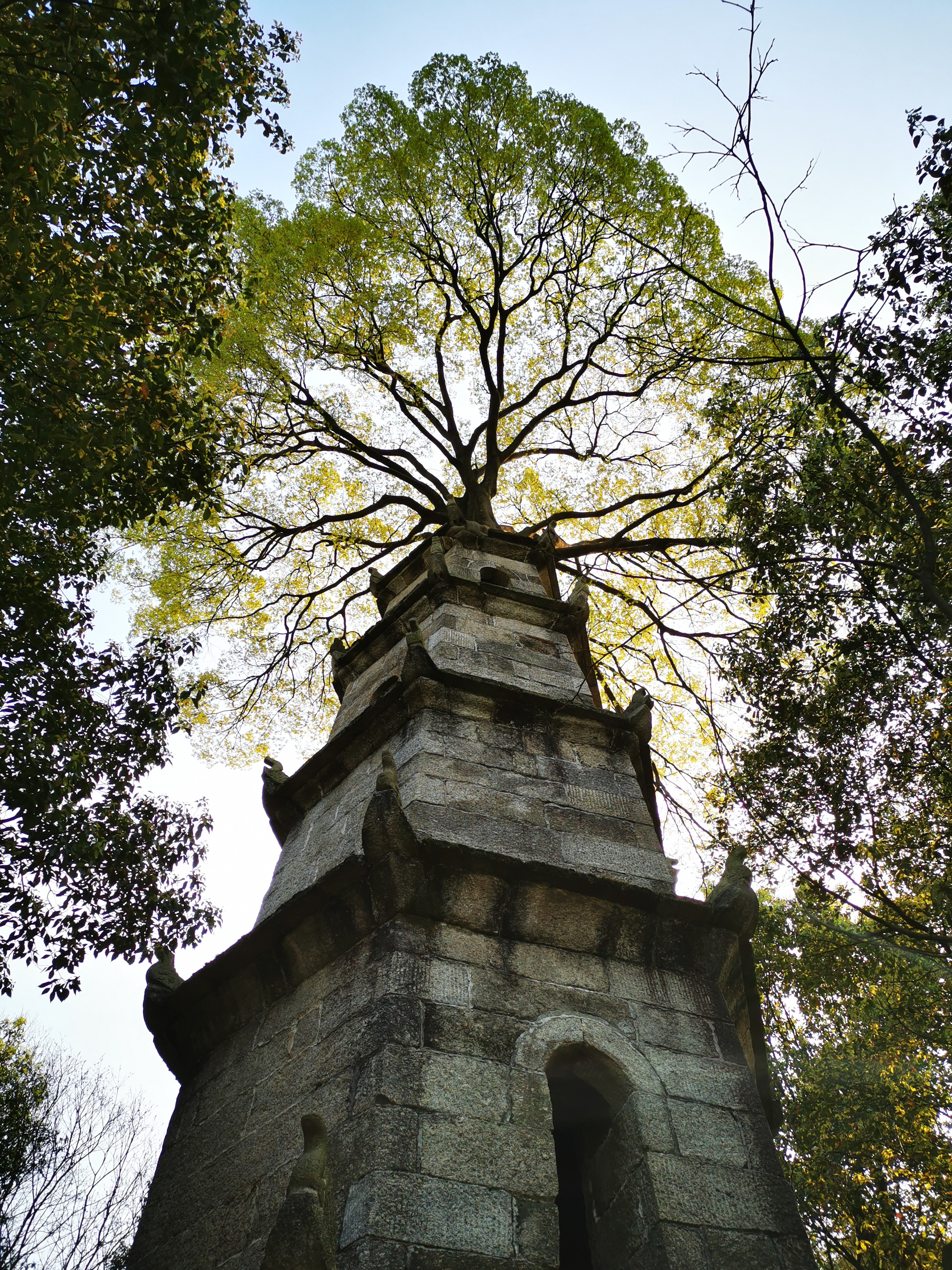
Xizi Tower.

Chating (simplified Chinese: 茶亭鎮; traditional Chinese: 茶亭镇; pinyin: chátíng zhèn) is a town in Wangcheng district of Changsha, Hunan, China. the town is located on the northeast of the district, and bordered by Zhangshu and Jinlong towns of Xiangyin county to the north, Gaojiafang town of Miluo city to the east, Qiaoyi town to the south, Dingziwan and Tongguan Subdistricts to the west. It covers 135 km^{2} (52 sq mi) with a population of 54,000. The town contains 11 villages and two residential communities. Yts administrative center is at Meihualing (梅花岭).

== Subdivision ==
The Chating town was formed by merging the former Dongcheng town (东城镇) and Chating on November 19, 2015. Chating has 11 villages and two residential communities under its jurisdiction from 2016. there were 15 villages and two residential communities in the subdistrict at that time till 2015. There three new villages were formed by merging six villages, meanwhile Dongcheng residential community (东城社区) was formed by merging Shenjiaqiao residential community (慎家桥社区) and Jingshen village (静慎村) on March 23, 2016.

Administrative divisions of Chating subdistrict in 2016
The administrative centre of the town is at Meihualing; the following list is according to the result of Ajustment on village-level divisions on March 23, 2016; Chating has 11 villages and two residential communities under its jurisdiction.
villages and residential communities		villages	
English name	Chinese name	English name	Chinese name
Meihualing residential community	梅花岭社区	Hongkaiqiao village	洪开桥村
Dongcheng residential community reformed by Merging Shenjiaqiao residential community (慎家桥社区) and Jinshen village (静慎村) on March 23, 2016	东城社区	Dalong village reformed by Merging Dalong village (大龙村) and Jingousi village (金钩寺村) on March 23, 2016	大龙村
Jiufeng village	九峰山村	Quanfeng village	泉丰村
Shiziling village reformed by Merging Shiziling (狮子岭村) village and Zhongxing village (中兴村) on March 23, 2016	狮子岭村	Suliao village reformed by Merging Suliao village (苏蓼村) and Dongzha village (东闸村) on March 23, 2016	苏蓼村
Tanjiayan village	谭家园村	Wangqun village	望群村
Xihusi village	西湖寺村	Yangjiaping village	杨家坪村
Daigongqiao village	戴公桥村		
