= Dongcheng, Wangcheng =

Coordinates: 28.5065°N 112.8119°E

Dongcheng 东城社区
- community
- Interactive map of Dongcheng
- Country: People's Republic of China
- Province: Hunan
- Prefecture-level city: Changsha
- District: Wangcheng
- town: Chating

Area
  - Total: 9.2 km^{2} (3.6 sq mi)

Population
  - Total: 4,880
  - Density: 530/km^{2} (1,400/sq mi)
- 2016

Dongcheng (simplified Chinese: 东城社区; traditional Chinese: 東城社區; pinyin: Dōngchéng Shèqū) is a community of Chating town, Wangcheng District, Changsha. It is located on the northern margin of Wangcheng District, and the west of Chating town. the community was formed by merging the Shenjiaqiao Community (慎家桥社区) and Jingshen Village (静慎村) on March 23, 2016. there is about a population of 4,880.

== History ==
The present place of Dongcheng is a community of village-level administrative division, and it is also the center of west Chating town. After revocation of Dongchen town which merged to Chating on November 19, 2015, the residential community was reformed by merging Shenjiaqiao Community and Jinshen Village March 23, 2016.

=== Historic Dongcheng Town ===
As a historic township-level division, Dongcheng was formed from a portion of Tongguan commune (铜官公社) in 1961, Dongcheng existed for about 55 years until Dongcheng Town was incorporated into Chating on November 19, 2015.

Dongcheng was the places of Tongxin (同心乡) and minzhu (民主乡) Townships in 1951, a portion of Tongguan Commune in 1958. Dongcheng Commune was formed from a portion of Tongguan Commune in 1961, it was renamed as Dongcheng Township in 1984 and changed as Dongcheng Town in 1995.

Dongcheng covered an area of 56 km^{2} (22 sq mi). There were 15 villages under its jurisdiction till adjustment of village-level divisions in 2005. The 15 village-level divisions were merged to seven villages and a community in 2005. There was a permanent population of 13,576 (2010 census), and a registered population of 19,028 (2012).

Changes of the subdivisions in the historic Dongcheng Town
Subdivisions of the historic Dongcheng Town		Changes after the solution of the Dongcheng Town	
English	Chinese	English	Chinese
Dalong Village	大龙村	Dalong Village	大龙村
Jingousi Village	金钩寺村	Dalong Village	大龙村
Suliao Village	苏廖村	Suliao Village	苏廖村
Dongzha Village	东闸村	Suliao Village	苏廖村
Quanfeng Village: formed by the historic Hexin and Fengcheng villages in 2005	泉丰村:由原合心村和丰城村于2005年组建	Quanfeng Village	泉丰村
Yangjiaping Village	杨家坪村	Yangjiaping Village	杨家坪村
Shenjiaqiao Community (formed by Wusha and Dongcheng villages)	慎家桥社区(五杉村和东城村合并设立)	Wusha Groups of the historic Shenjiaqiao Community (the place of historic Wusha village) merging to Huacheng Village of Tongguan Subdistrict	原慎家桥社区五杉片（原五杉村地域）划入铜官镇华城社区
Shenjiaqiao Community (formed by Wusha and Dongcheng villages)	慎家桥社区(五杉村和东城村合并设立)	Dongcheng Groups of the historic Shenjiaqiao Community (the place of historic Dongcheng Village) merging to Dongcheng Community	慎家桥社区其余部分即原慎家桥社区东城片(原东城村区域)和静慎村合并设立东城社区
Shenjiaqiao Community (formed by Wusha and Dongcheng villages)	慎家桥社区(五杉村和东城村合并设立)	Dongcheng Community	东城社区
Jingshen Village	静慎村	Dongcheng Community	东城社区
