= Tongguan Subdistrict =

Tongguan subdistrict 铜官街道
- Subdistrict
- Location in Hunan
- Country: People's Republic of China
- Province: Hunan
- Prefecture-level city: Changsha
- District: Wangcheng

Area
  - Total: 90.3 km^{2} (34.9 sq mi)

Population (2015)
  - Total: 50,000
  - Density: 550/km^{2} (1,400/sq mi)
- Time zone: UTC+8 (China Standard)
- Postal code: 410203
- Area code: 0731
- Website: http://tgz.wangcheng.gov.cn/

Tongguan (simplified Chinese: 铜官街道; traditional Chinese: 銅官街道; pinyin: Tóngguān Jiēdào) is a subdistrict of Wangcheng district, Changsha, China. It is located on the eastern bank of Xiang river, the subdistrict is bordered by Dingziwan subdistrict to the south, Qiaoyi and Chating towns to the east and north, Jinggang Town and Gaotangling subdistrict across the Xiang river to the west. Tongguan has an area of 90.3 km^{2} (34.9 sq mi) with a population of 50 thousand, its administrative centre is at Huacheng village. the subdistrict has five residential communities and nine villages under its jurisdiction. Tongguan is located on the eastern bank of Xiangjiang River in the northern part of Wangcheng District. It has one provincial-level cultural relic protection unit, one municipal-level cultural relic protection unit, four county-level cultural relic protection unit and two county-level cultural relic site. Tongguan has been known as "Town of Ceramics" and "Ancient Tongguan Town".

Tongguan is a national famous tourism town with characteristic landscape published in 2015, also a small town with a particular character of Hunan; it was designated a famous historical and cultural town of Hunan province in 2007.

== Early history ==
Tongguan is an ancient town with a history of over 2,100 years. There was a bridge named Wuchu (吴楚桥) at Shigang (誓港), According to legend, the bridge was at the boundary point of Wu and Chu states in the Warring States period (476–221 BC). The unearthed earthenwares at Mawangdui proved that at latest Tongguan started to produce potteries in the western Han periods (206 BC–9 AD). The archaeological excavation at Tongguan Kiln Site showed that, the technology of underglazed color figure was originated there in the Tang (618–907 AC) and Five Dynasties periods (907–960 AC). The production of underglaze wares was once prosperous at the later Tang period, and declined in the Five Dynasties periods in the place.

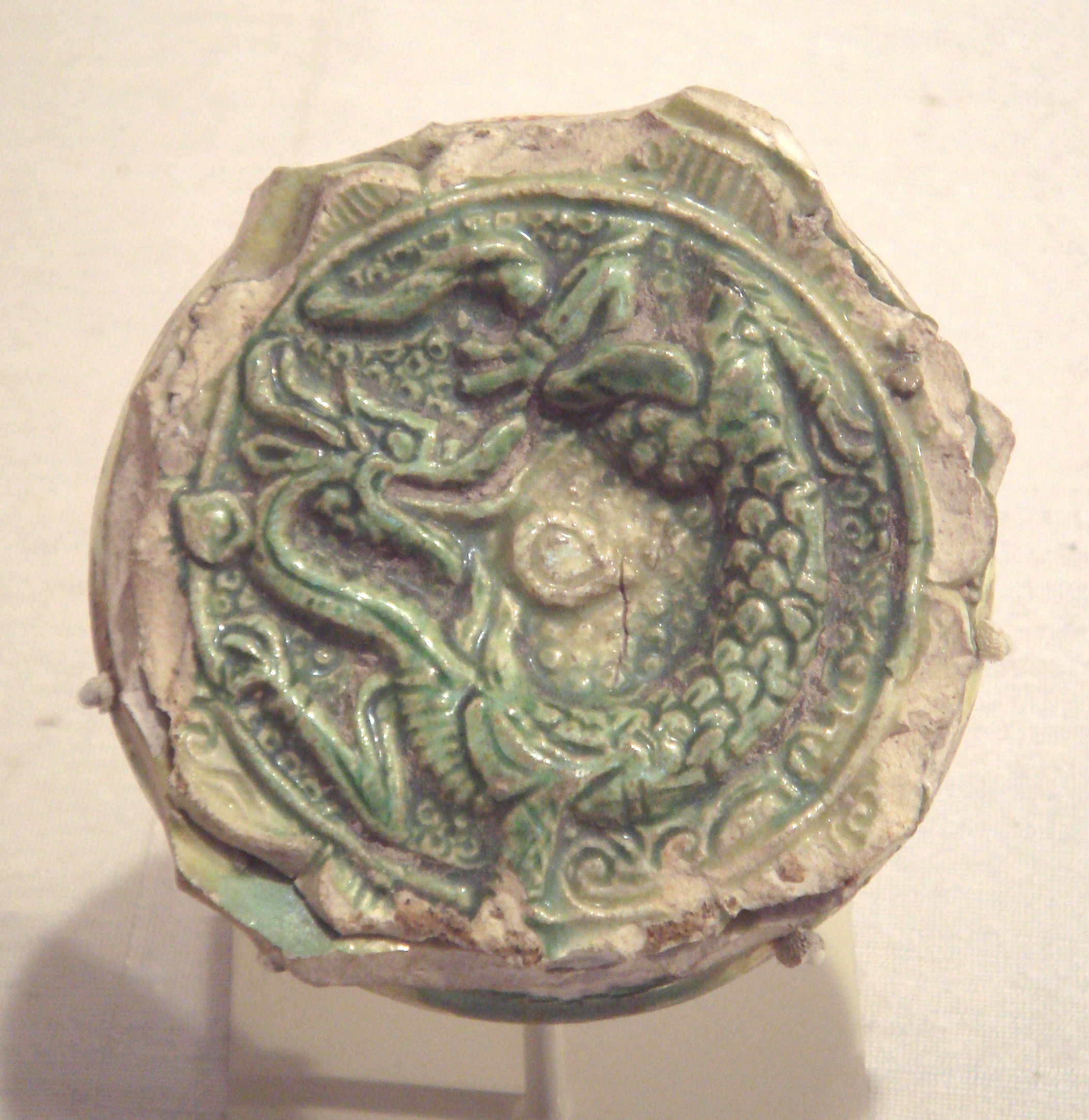
Tang dynasty earthenware fragment with sancai glaze, excavated in Nishapur, Iran.

During An Lushan Rebellion (755–763 AC), the Land traffic from the North, Northwest China to the Middle East Arabdom and Persia was blocked, meanwhile the maritime trade was thriving in the South China. As a commercial port and one of pottery industrial centres, early in the Tang dynasty, pottery trade between Tongguan and other areas already began, the place should be also the earliest export trade port in the history of Changsha. A Tang Belitung wreck was discovered by fishermen in 1988 At Belitung island, Indonesia (Gaspar Strait). Radiocarbon dating of the ship's timber produced a relatively wide range date of 710–890 AD for the wreck. the cultural relics was so-called "Tang treasure" in the salvage of the wreck, the majority of that are wares from Changsha produced in kilns in Tongguan, and the text transcript on relics used the calendar era of Tang period (618–907 AC). What above-mentioned is a strong evidence, as once a trade-exported port and centre of pottery production, the place of Tongguan played an important role in the history of China or Hunan.

== Subdivision ==
The Tongguan subdistrict was formed by merging the former Tongguan town (铜官镇), Shutangshan subdistrict (书堂山街道), Guoliang village (郭亮村) of Chating town and a portion of Shenjiaqiao residential community (慎家桥社区) of Dongcheng town on November 19, 2015; there were 10 villages and five residential communities in the subdistrict at that time. Tanzhou residential community was formed by merging Taifeng village (太丰村) and Hongjiazhou residential community (洪家洲社区) on March 23, 2016; the subdistrict has nine villages and five residential communities in 2016.

Administrative divisions of Tongguan subdistrict in 2016
administrative centre: Baoyong neighborhood of Huacheng (华城村保拥小区) amount of divisions: five residential communities and nine villages
villages and residential communities		villages	
English name	Chinese name	English name	Chinese name
Gaoling residential community	高岭社区	Heqiao village	何桥村
Shigang residential community	誓港社区	Huashi village	花实村
Tanzhou residential community formed at merging Taifeng and Hongjiazhou	潭州社区 formed at merging 太丰村 and 洪家洲社区	Huacheng village	华城村
Tongguanjie residential community	铜官街社区	Shizhuhu village	石渚湖村
Yuanjiahu residential community	袁家湖社区	Shutangshan village	书堂山村
Caitaoyuan village	彩陶源村	Wanxing village	万星村
Guoliang village	郭亮村	Zhongshan village	中山村

=== Unearthed pottery at Tang Belitung wreck ===
The following are the showpieces of Tang Belitung wreck at Marina Bay Sands museum, Singapore. the showpieces are the unearthed cultural relics from the wreck, the potteries made in Tongguan in Tang period.

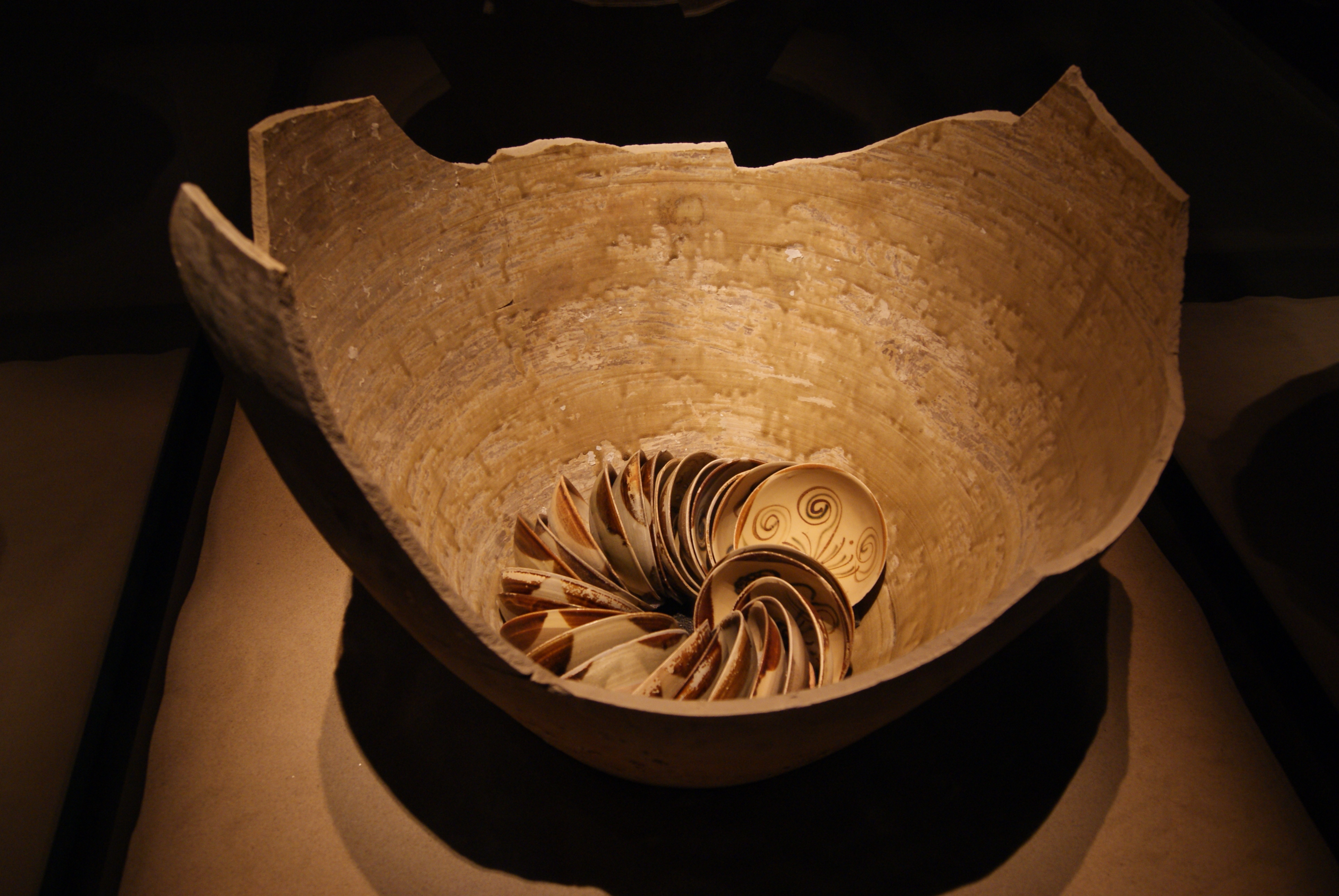

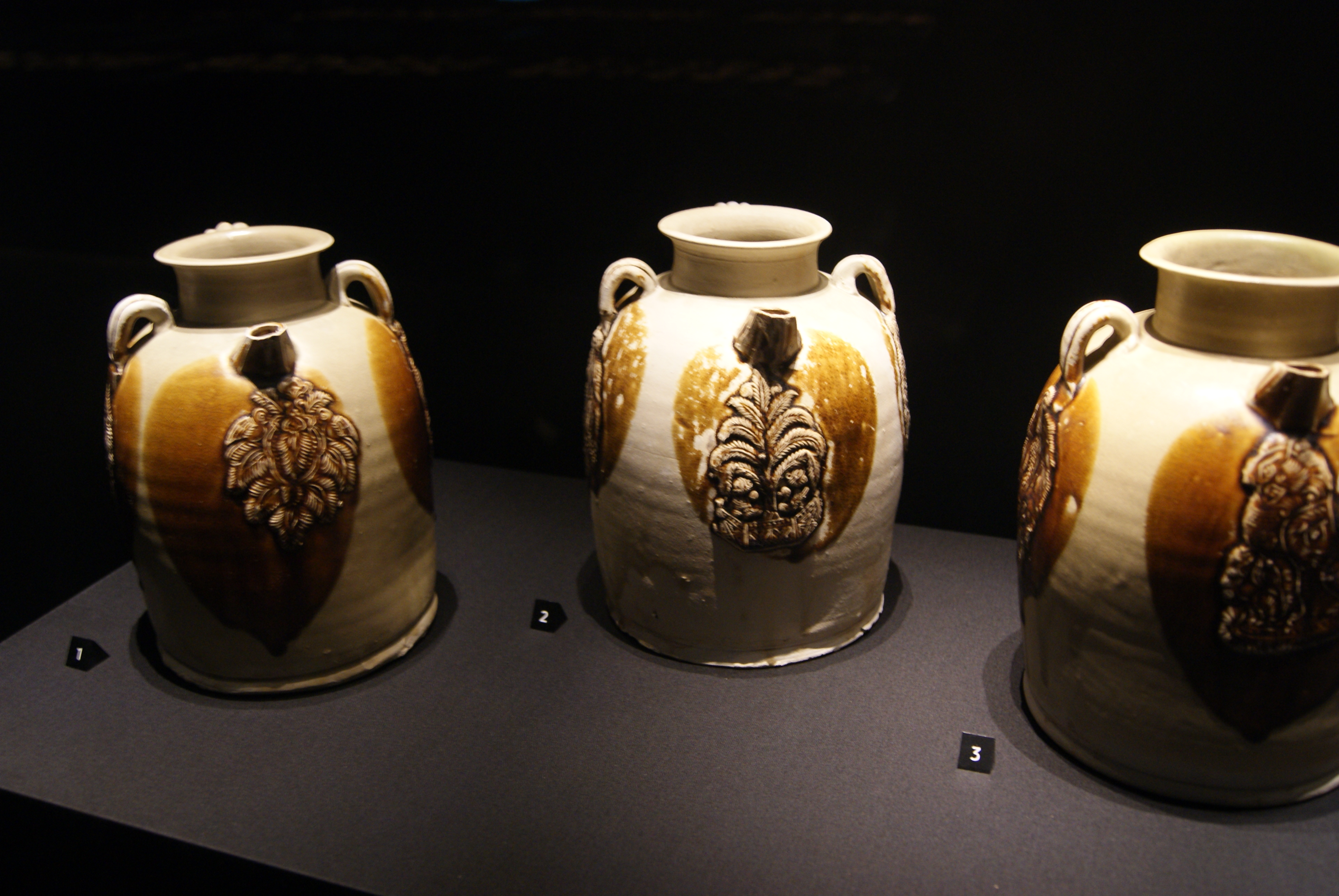

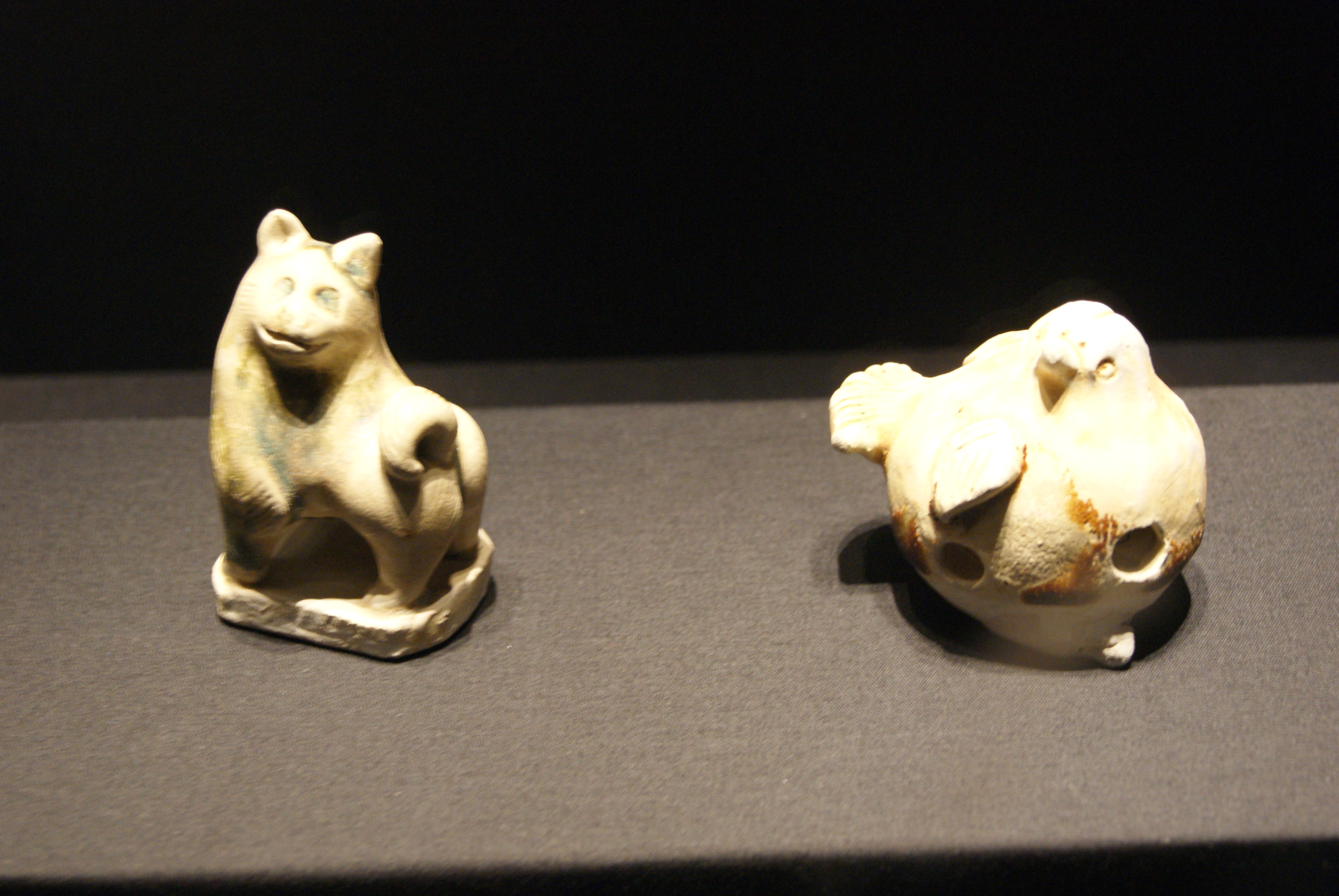

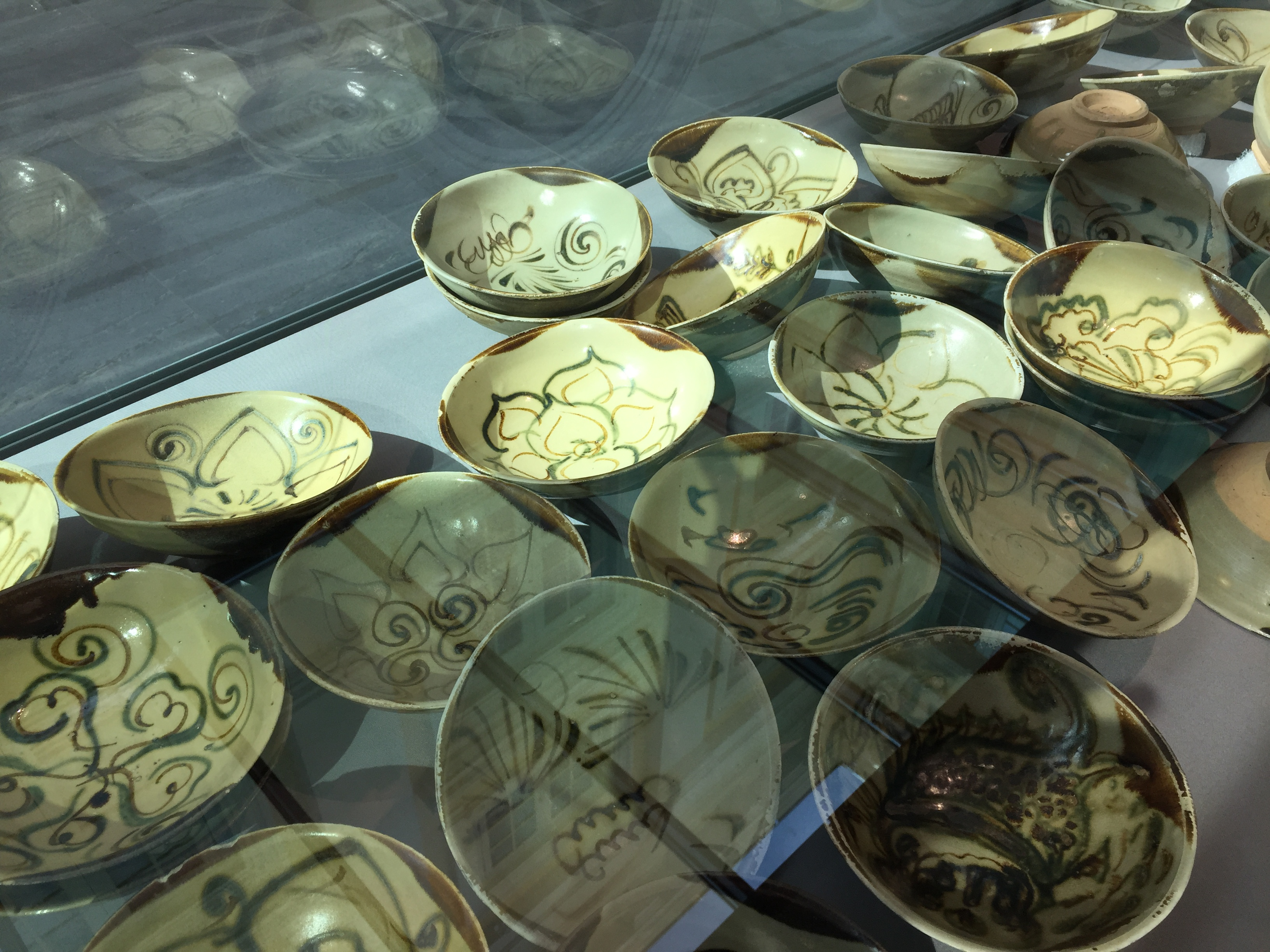

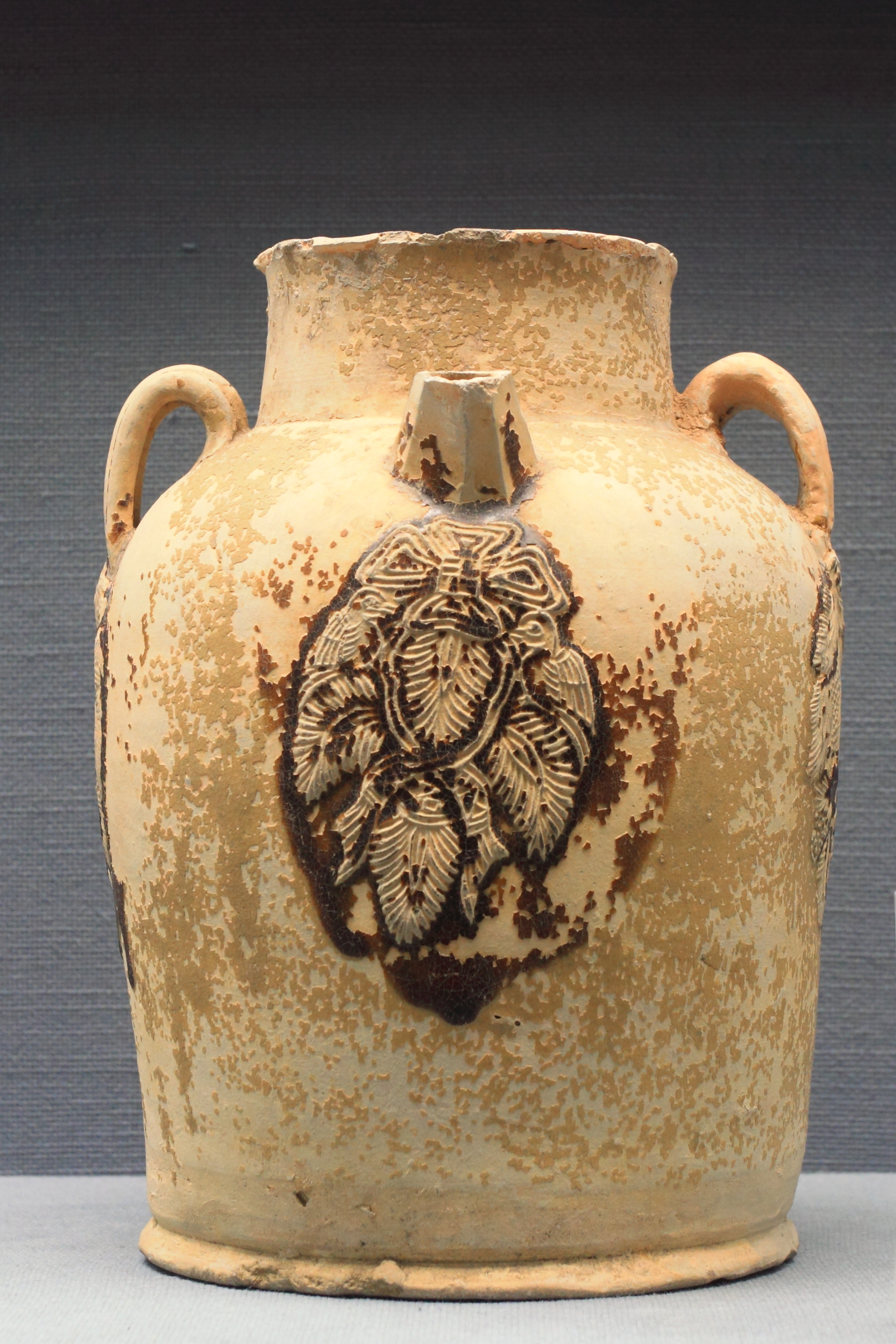

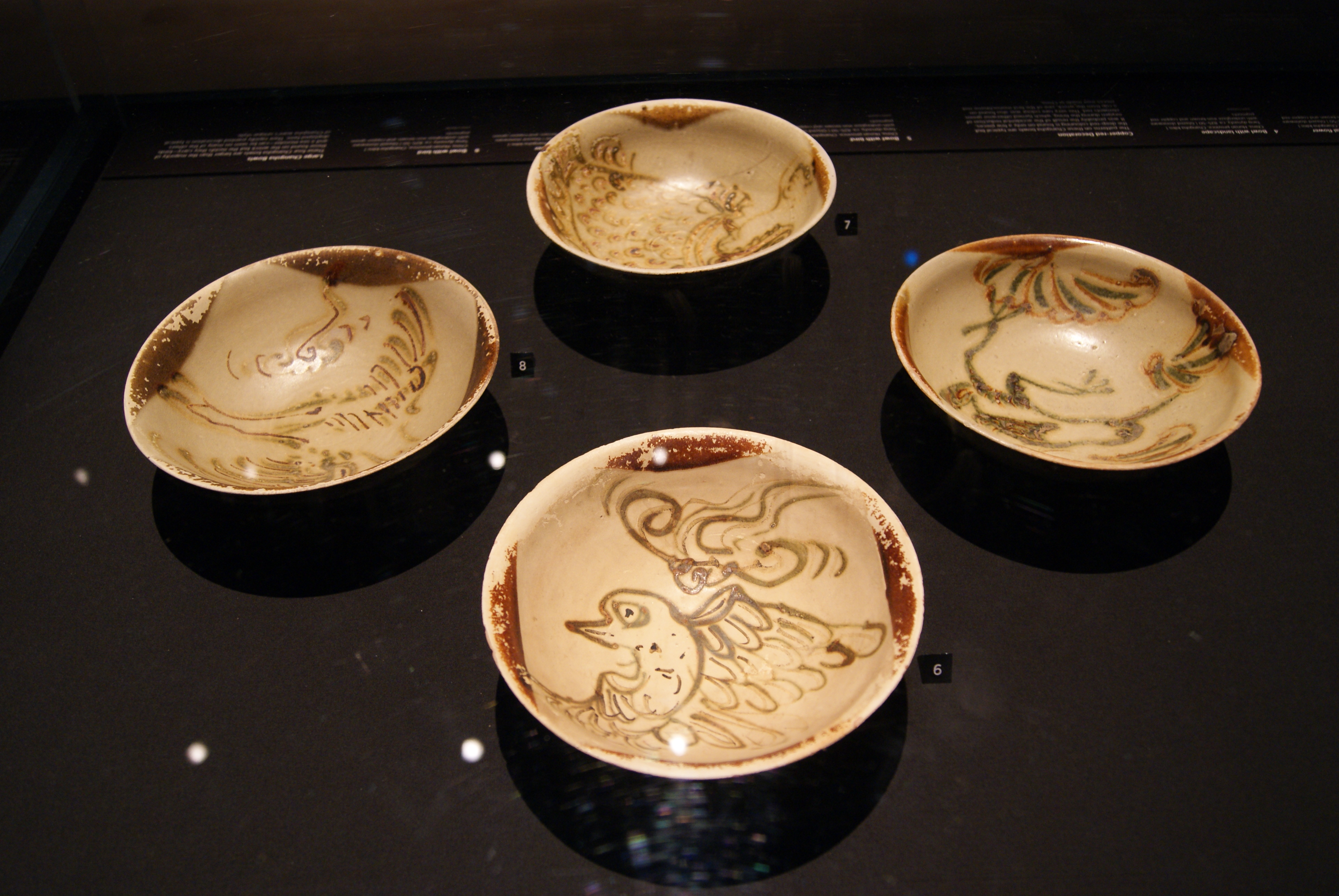

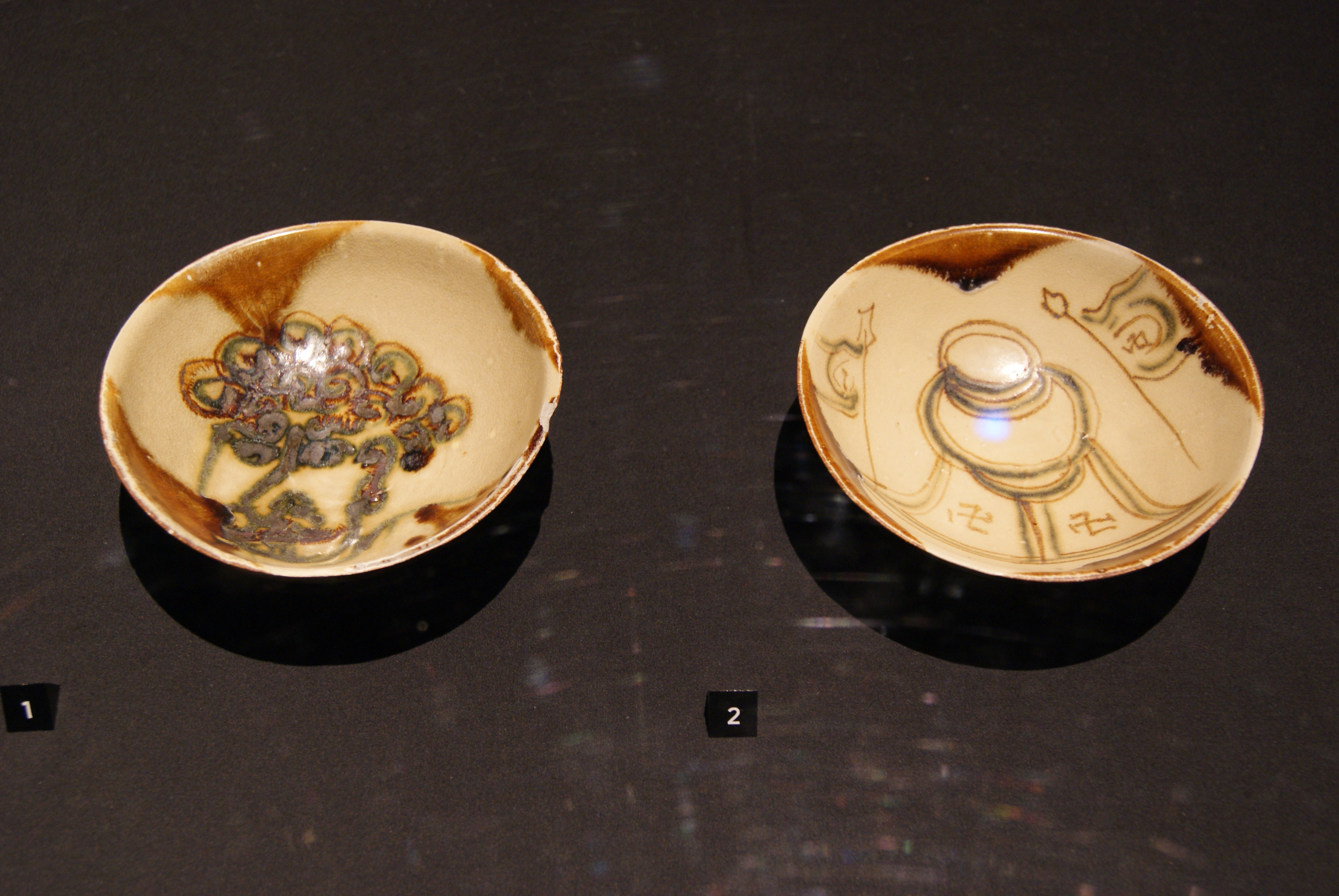

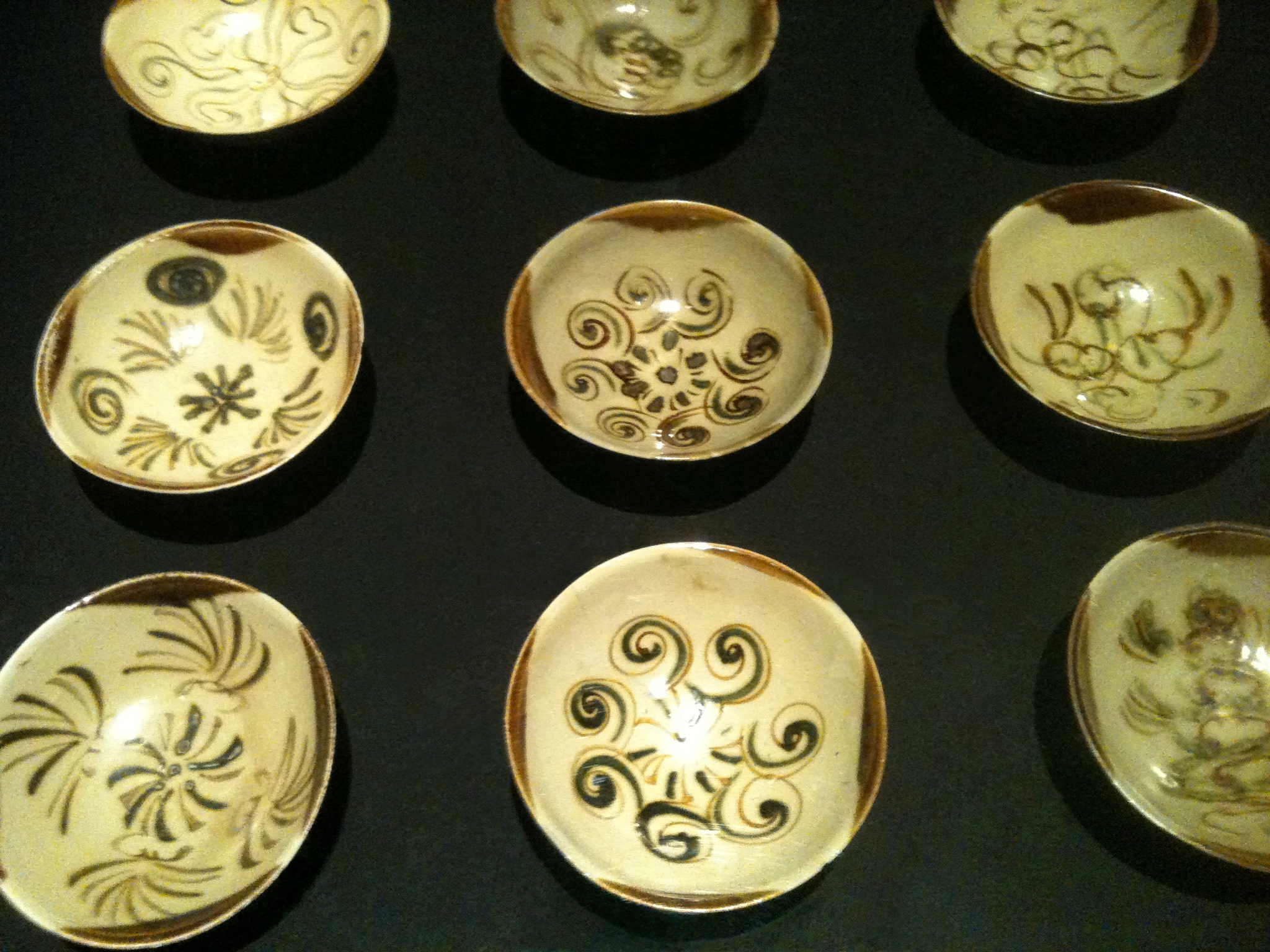

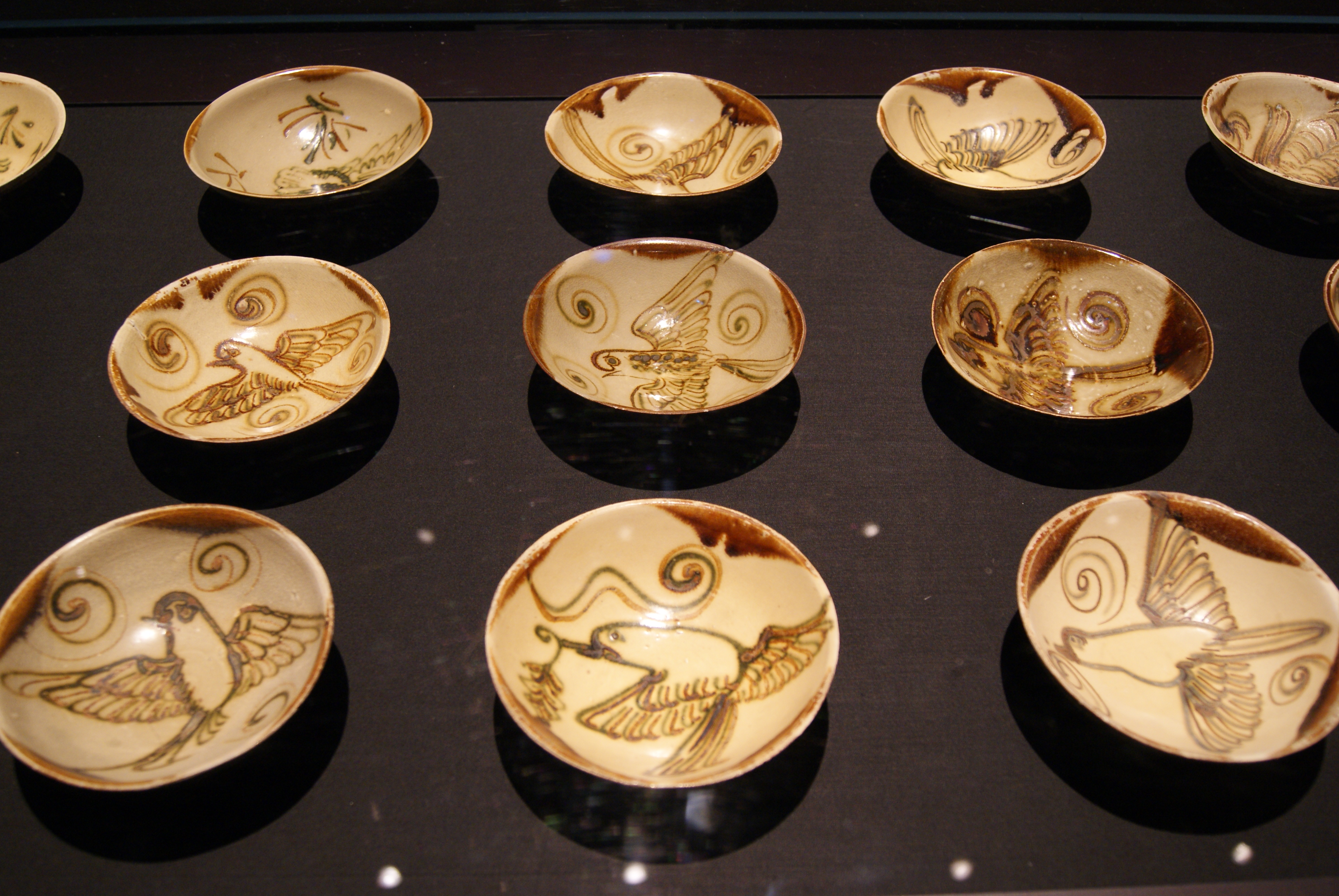

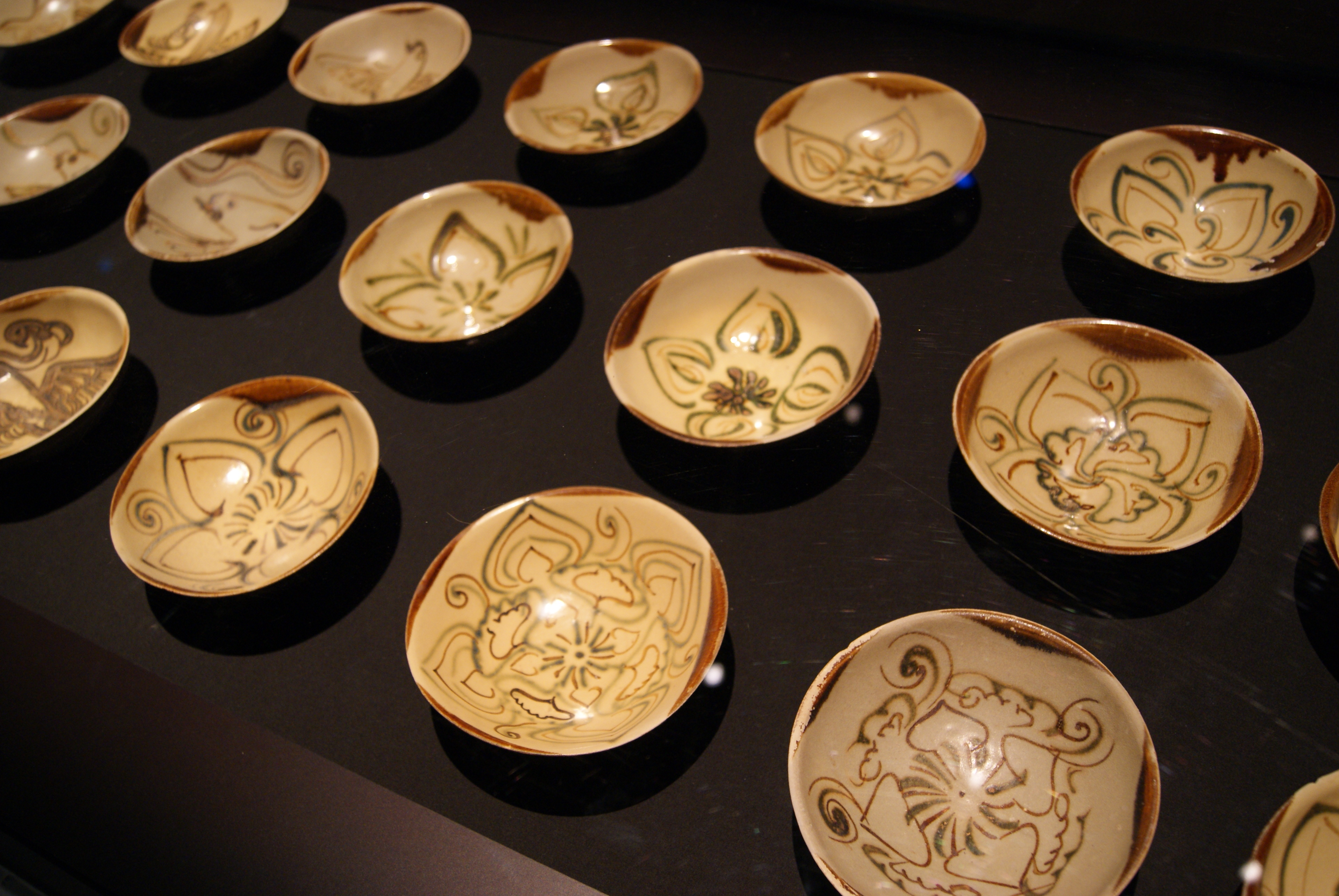

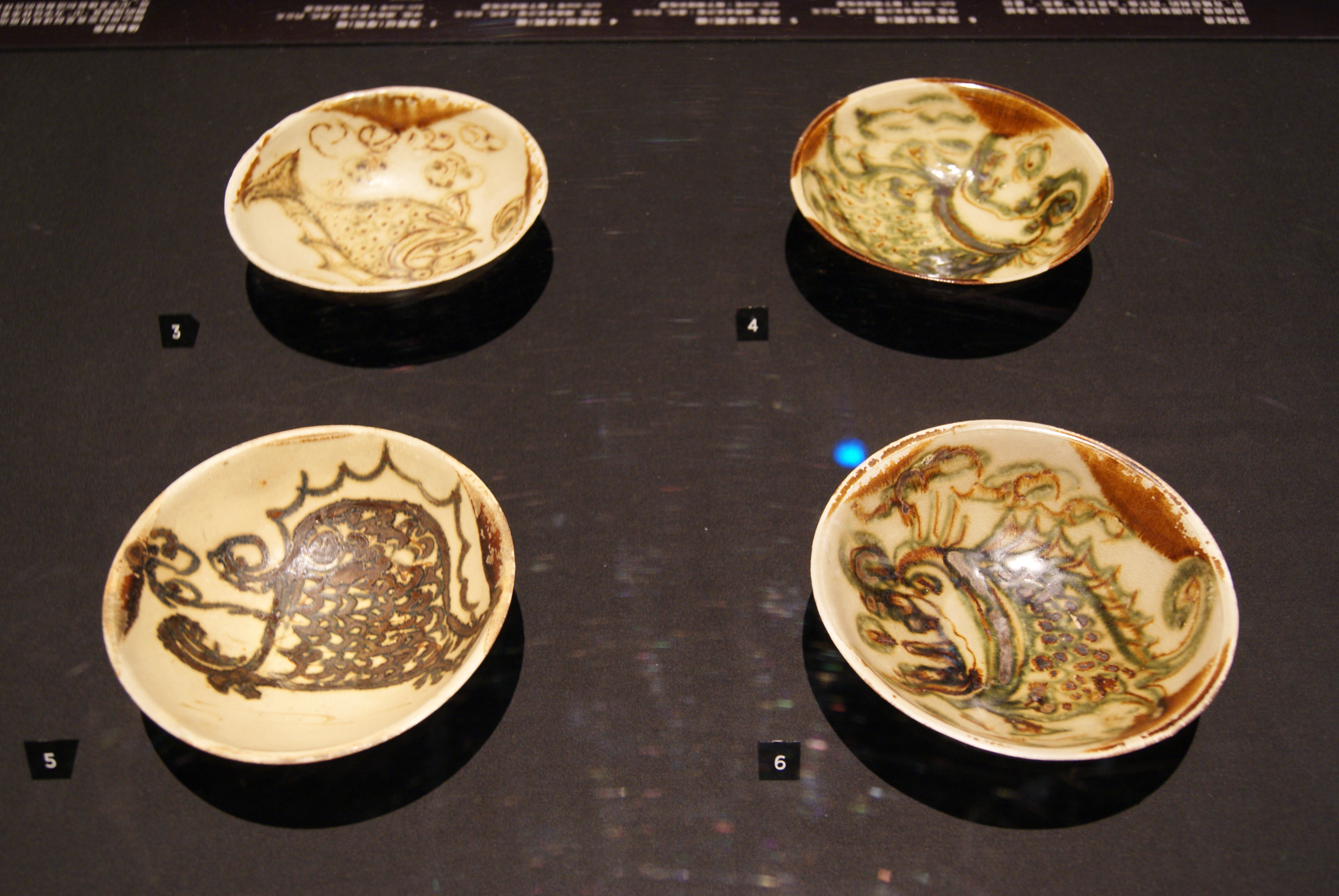

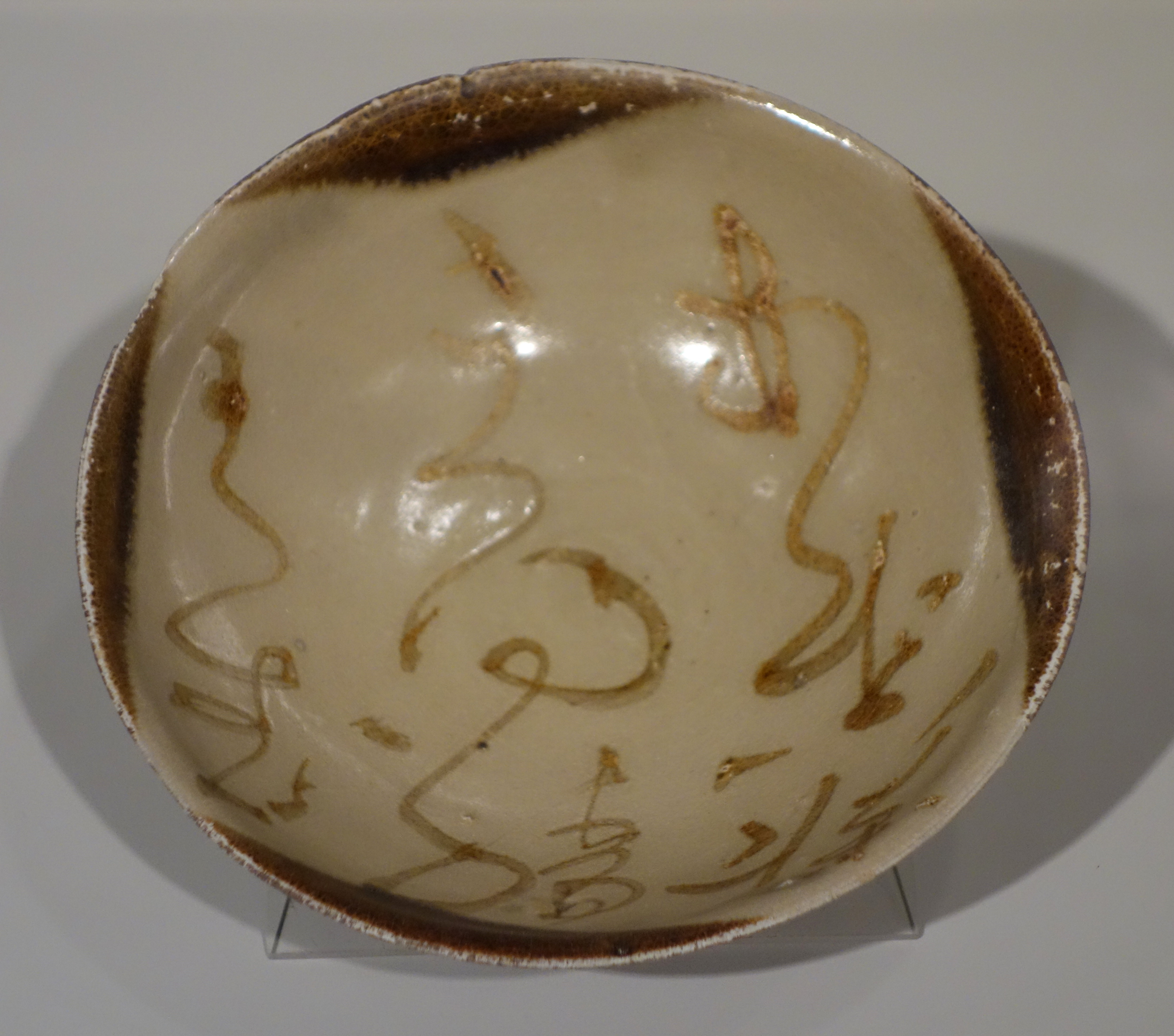

== Culture ==
The Tongguan pottery firing technology was selected into the list of state-level intangible cultural heritage.

== Attractions ==
Tongguan Street, Fanjia Kiln of the Tang dynasty (618–907), Waixing Kiln of the Ming dynasty (1368–1644), Yixing Kiln of the Qing dynasty (1644–1912), Du Fu Shoufeng Pavilion (杜甫守风阁), Wuchu Bridge (吴楚桥), Dongshan Temple (东山寺), ancient tomb complex of the Warring States period (475 B.C-221 B.C) (战国古墓群) and ancient architecture complex of the Ming and Qing dynasties (1368–1912) (明清古建筑群) have innumerable links to the ancient marks of Tongguan.
