= Huixian =

Huixian 辉县市 Hweihsien
- County-level city
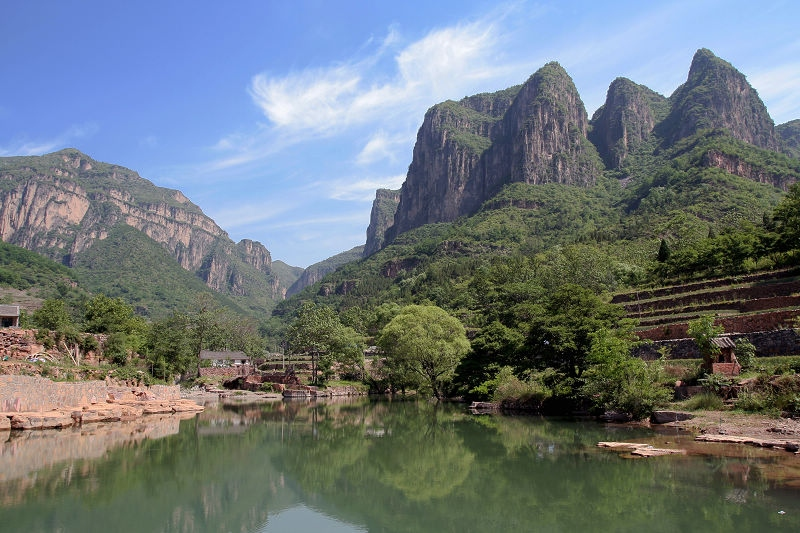

- Location in Henan
- Country: People's Republic of China
- Province: Henan
- Prefecture-level city: Xinxiang

Area
  - Total: 2,007 km^{2} (775 sq mi)

Population (2019)
  - Total: 759,900
- Time zone: UTC+8 (China Standard)
- Postal code: 453600

Huixian (simplified Chinese: 辉县; traditional Chinese: 輝縣; pinyin: Huīxiàn) is a county-level city under the administration of the prefecture-level city of Xinxiang, in the northwest of Henan province, China, bordering Shanxi province to the northwest.

== Administrative divisions ==
As of 2012, this city is divided to 2 subdistricts, 11 towns and 9 townships.

Subdistricts

- Chengguan Subdistrict (城关街道)
- Huqiao Subdistrict (胡桥街道)

Towns

- Baobi (薄壁镇)
- Yuhe (峪河镇)
- Baiquan (百泉镇)
- Mengzhuang (孟庄镇)
- Changcun (常村镇)
- Wucun (吴村镇)
- Nancun (南村镇)
- Nanzhai (南寨镇)
- Shangbali (上八里镇)
- Beiyunmen (北云门镇)
- Zhancheng (占城镇)

Townships

- Huangshui Township (黄水乡)
- Gaozhuang Township (高庄乡)
- Zhangcun Township (张村乡)
- Hongzhou Township (洪洲乡)
- Xipingluo Township (西平罗乡)
- Paishitou Township (拍石头乡)
- Zhaogu Township (赵固乡)
- Shayao Township (沙窑乡)
- Jitun Township (冀屯乡)

== Climate ==
Climate data for Huixian, elevation 141 m (463 ft), (1991–2020 normals, extremes 1981–2010)
Month	Jan	Feb	Mar	Apr	May	Jun	Jul	Aug	Sep	Oct	Nov	Dec	Year
Record high °C (°F)	17.0 (62.6)	24.7 (76.5)	28.8 (83.8)	35.9 (96.6)	39.3 (102.7)	42.0 (107.6)	41.5 (106.7)	39.1 (102.4)	37.7 (99.9)	35.0 (95.0)	26.9 (80.4)	23.6 (74.5)	42.0 (107.6)
Mean daily maximum °C (°F)	5.4 (41.7)	9.6 (49.3)	15.7 (60.3)	22.3 (72.1)	27.9 (82.2)	32.5 (90.5)	32.3 (90.1)	31.0 (87.8)	27.3 (81.1)	21.6 (70.9)	13.6 (56.5)	7.3 (45.1)	20.5 (69.0)
Daily mean °C (°F)	0.0 (32.0)	3.7 (38.7)	9.7 (49.5)	16.1 (61.0)	21.8 (71.2)	26.6 (79.9)	27.6 (81.7)	26.3 (79.3)	21.8 (71.2)	15.7 (60.3)	8.0 (46.4)	1.8 (35.2)	14.9 (58.9)
Mean daily minimum °C (°F)	−4.0 (24.8)	−0.9 (30.4)	4.5 (40.1)	10.5 (50.9)	16.1 (61.0)	21.2 (70.2)	23.7 (74.7)	22.6 (72.7)	17.5 (63.5)	11.0 (51.8)	3.6 (38.5)	−2.3 (27.9)	10.3 (50.5)
Record low °C (°F)	−18.3 (−0.9)	−17.8 (0.0)	−9.3 (15.3)	−1.1 (30.0)	4.5 (40.1)	10.3 (50.5)	17.0 (62.6)	13.5 (56.3)	7.4 (45.3)	−2.5 (27.5)	−10.1 (13.8)	−12.9 (8.8)	−18.3 (−0.9)
Average precipitation mm (inches)	5.1 (0.20)	8.8 (0.35)	14.2 (0.56)	29.9 (1.18)	53.2 (2.09)	71.7 (2.82)	177.9 (7.00)	111.3 (4.38)	63.9 (2.52)	29.3 (1.15)	18.0 (0.71)	4.6 (0.18)	587.9 (23.14)
Average precipitation days (≥ 0.1 mm)	2.6	3.3	4.1	5.0	7.0	8.2	12.4	10.3	7.7	6.2	4.5	2.2	73.5
Average snowy days	3.2	2.7	1.1	0.2	0	0	0	0	0	0	1.0	2.0	10.2
Average relative humidity (%)	61	58	56	61	62	60	76	78	73	68	68	63	65
Mean monthly sunshine hours	101.5	115.3	160.4	187.3	206.0	183.1	142.0	150.9	141.6	142.2	123.4	114.1	1,767.8
Percentage possible sunshine	32	37	43	47	47	42	32	37	39	41	40	38	40
Source: China Meteorological Administration
