= List of Shijiazhuang Metro stations =

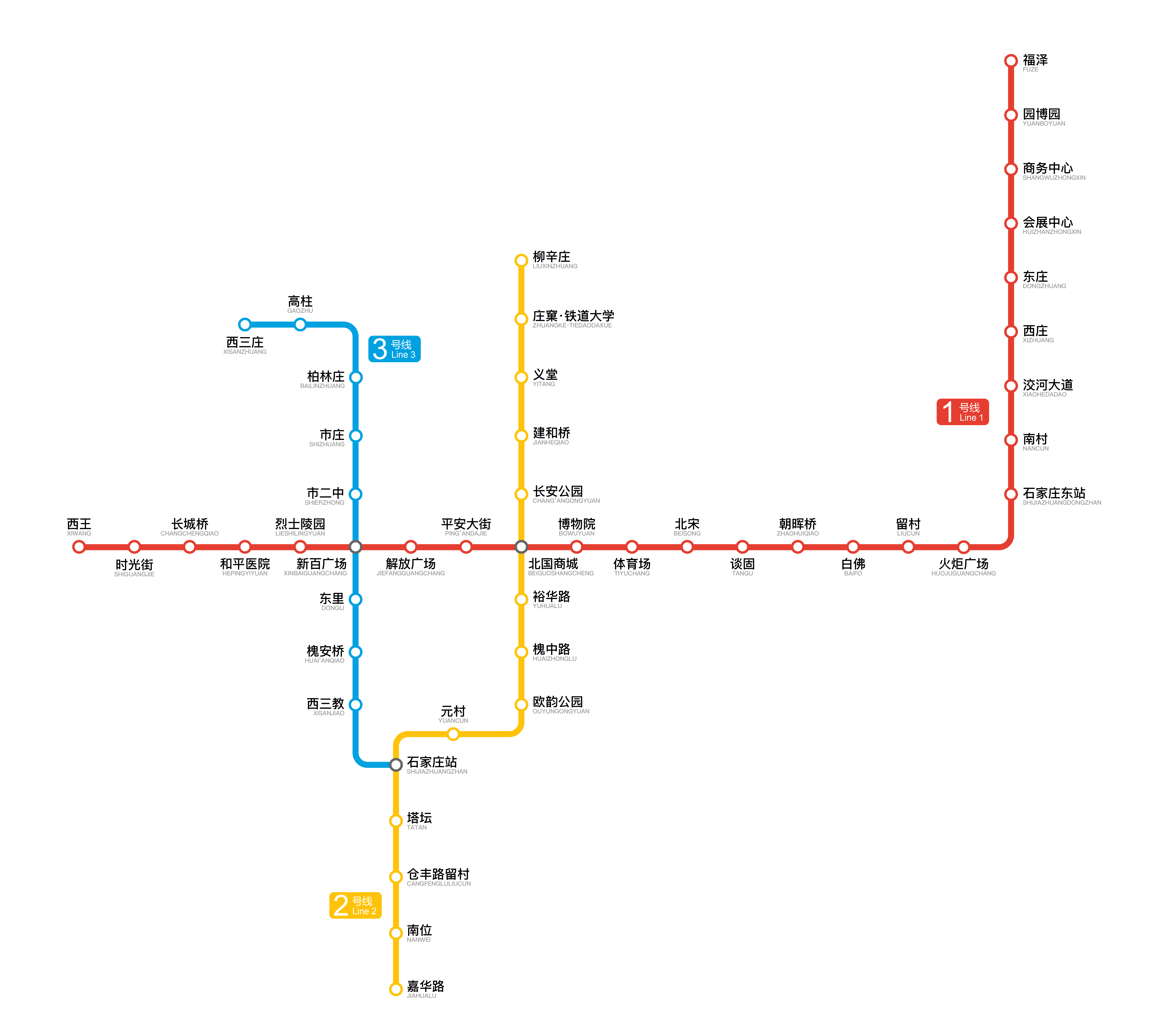
Map of Shijiazhuang Metro

The following is a list of stations found within the Shijiazhuang Metro

== Line 1 ==
Station name		Connections	Distance km	Location
English	Chinese	Connections	Distance km	Location
Xiwang	西王			Qiaoxi
Shiguangjie	时光街			Qiaoxi
Changchengqiao	长城桥			Qiaoxi
Hepingyiyuan	和平医院			Qiaoxi
Lieshilingyuan	烈士陵园			Qiaoxi
Xinbaiguangchang	新百广场	3		Qiaoxi
Jiefangguangchang	解放广场			Qiaoxi
Ping'andajie	平安大街			Qiaoxi
Beiguoshangcheng	北国商城	2		Chang'an
Bowuyuan	博物院			Chang'an
Tiyuchang	体育场			Chang'an
Beisong	北宋			Chang'an
Tangu	谈固			Chang'an
Zhaohuiqiao	朝晖桥			Chang'an
Baifo	白佛			Yuhua
Liucun	留村			Yuhua
Huojuguangchang	火炬广场			Yuhua
Shijiazhuangdongzhan	石家庄东站	SXP		Yuhua
Nancun	南村			Chang'an
Xiaohedadao	洨河大道			Chang'an
Xizhuang	西庄			Chang'an
Dongzhuang	东庄			Chang'an
Huizhanzhongxin	会展中心			Zhengding
Shangwuzhongxin	商务中心			Zhengding
Yuanboyuan	园博园			Zhengding
Fuze	福泽			Zhengding
Dongshangze	东上泽			Zhengding
Dongyang	东洋			Zhengding

== Line 2 ==
Station name		Connections	Distance km	Location
English	Chinese	Connections	Distance km	Location
Liuxinzhuang	柳辛庄			
Zhuanghuo · Tiedaodaxue	庄窠·铁道大学			
Yitang	义堂			
Jianheqiao	建和桥			
Chang'angongyuan	长安公园			
Beiguoshangcheng	北国商城	1		
Yuhualu	裕华路			
Huaizhonglu	槐中路			
Ouyungongyuan	欧韵公园			
Yuancun	元村			
Shijiazhuangzhan	石家庄站	SJP; 3		
Tatan	塔谈			
Cangfengluliucun	仓丰路留村			
Nanwei	南位			
Jiahualu	嘉华路			

== Line 3 ==
Station name		Connections	Distance km	Location
English	Chinese	Connections	Distance km	Location
Xisanzhuang	西三庄			Xinhua
Gaozhu	高柱			Xinhua
Bailinzhuang	柏林庄			Xinhua
Shizhuang	市庄			Xinhua
Shierzhong	市二中			Xinhua
Xinbaiguangchang	新百广场	1		Qiaoxi
Dongli	东里			Qiaoxi
Huai'anqiao	槐安桥			Qiaoxi
Xisanjiao	西三教			Qiaoxi
Shijiazhuangzhan	石家庄站	SJP 2		Qiaoxi / Yuhua
Huitonglu	汇通路			
Suncun	孙村			
Tazhong	塔冢			
Dongwang	东王			
Nanwang	南王			
Weitong	位同			
Dong'erhuannanlu	东二环南路			
Xiyangling	西仰陵			
Zhongyangling	中仰陵			
Nandou	南豆			
Taihangnandajie	太行南大街			
Lexiang	乐乡			
