= Songying =

Songying 宋营镇
- Town

Chinese transcription(s)
- Location in China
- Coordinates: 38°2′16″N 114°36′28″E
- Country: China
- Province: Hebei
- Prefecture: Shijiazhuang
- District: Yuhua District
- Time zone: UTC+8 (China Standard Time)

Songying (Chinese: 宋营镇) is a township-level division of Yuhua District, Shijiazhuang, Hebei, China.

== Geographical location ==
Songying is in the southeast of Shijiazhuang urban. To the east are Yudong Subdistrict, Yuqiang Subdistrict and Fangcun Town of Yuhua District. Bordered by Fangcun Town and Qiema Town to the south.

== See also ==
- List of township-level divisions of Hebei
