= Youyi =

Youyi (友谊; lit. "friendship") may refer to:

== Places ==
- Youyi Bridge, a bridge between Xinjiang and Pakistan
- Youyi County, Shuangyashan, Heilongjiang
- Friendship Pass, or Youyi Guan, a pass between Guangxi and Vietnam
- Youyi Road Station (Shanghai), a metro station in Shanghai Municipality

=== Subdistricts ===
- Youyi Subdistrict, Zhanjiang, in Xiashan District, Zhanjiang, Guangdong
- Youyi Subdistrict, Shijiazhuang, in Qiaoxi District, Shijiazhuang, Hebei
- Youyi Subdistrict, Daqing, in Sartu District, Daqing, Heilongjiang
- Youyi Subdistrict, Jiamusi, in Jiaoqu, Jiamusi, Heilongjiang
- Youyi Subdistrict, Jungar Banner, Inner Mongolia
- Youyi Subdistrict, Dalian, in Jinzhou District, Dalian, Liaoning
- Youyi Subdistrict, Panjin, in Xinglongtai District, Panjin, Liaoning
- Youyi Road Subdistrict, Shanghai, in Baoshan District
- Youyi Road Subdistrict, Tianjin, in Hexi District
- Youyi Road Subdistrict, Ürümqi, in Xinshi District, Ürümqi, Xinjiang

=== Towns ===
- Youyi, Guangxi, location of the Friendship Pass, in Pingxiang
- Youyi, Youyi County, Heilongjiang

=== Townships ===
- Youyi Township, Xinlong County, Sichuan
- Youyi Daur, Manchu, and Kirghiz Ethnic Township (友谊达斡尔族满族柯尔克孜族乡), Fuyu County, Heilongjiang

== People ==
- Youyi (name), a Chinese given name
- Youyi (actress) (有懿; born 1980), Singaporean actress
