= Yuqiang Subdistrict =

Yuqiang Subdistrict may refer to:

- Yuqiang Subdistrict, Harbin, Heilongjiang, China
- Yuqiang Subdistrict, Shijiazhuang, Hebei, China

== See also ==
- Yuqiang, deity from Chinese mythology
