= Yui (name) =

- Pronunciation: Yú-í
- Gender: Female
- Language: Japanese

Origin
- Origin: Japanese
- Meaning: Different depending on the kanji used
- Region of origin: Japan

Yui (ゆい, ユイ) is a feminine Japanese given name which can also be used as a surname.

== Written forms ==
Yui can be written using different kanji characters and can mean:

- 唯, "only, alone, sole"
- 由, "reason"
- 維, "supportive"
- 惟, "think, consider, reflect"
- 結, "tie/link"
- 唯衣, "only, robe/clothing"
- 由衣, "reason, robe/clothing"
- 結衣, "tie/link, robe/clothing"

The given name can also be written in hiragana or katakana.

As a surname

- 由井, "reason, well"
- 油井, "oil well"
- 由比, "reason, compare"

== People ==
With the given name Yui

- Yui (singer) (born 1987), Japanese pop/rock artist
- Yui Aragaki (新垣 結衣, born 1988), Japanese singer, actress and voice actress
- Yui Asaka (浅香 唯, born 1969), Japanese singer and actress
- Yui Hasegawa (長谷川 唯; born 1997), Japanese women's footballer
- Yui Horie (堀江 由衣, born 1976), Japanese singer and voice actress
- Yui Ichikawa (市川 由衣, born 1986), Japanese actress and singer
- Yui Imaizumi (今泉 佑唯; born 1998), Japanese actress and model
- Yui Ishibashi (石橋 唯今; born 1996), Japanese field hockey player
- Yui Ishikawa (石川 由依, born 1989), Japanese voice actress
- Yui Itsuki (伊月 ゆい, born 1980), Japanese Heavy Metal singer and lyricist, leader of the band Yōsei Teikoku
- Yui Kamiji (上地 結衣, born 1994), Japanese wheelchair tennis player
- Yui Kobayashi (小林 由依; born 1999), Japanese singer and model
- Yui Koike (小池 唯, born 1991), Japanese gravure figure and actress
- Yui Makino (牧野由依, born 1986), Japanese voice actress
- Yui Mizuno (水野 由結, born 1999), also known as YUIMETAL, Japanese singer and model
- Yui Natsukawa (夏川 結衣, born 1968), Japanese actress
- Yui Nītsu (由衣), a member of the former duo J-pop band Rythem
- Yui Oguri (born 2001), a Japanese singer and fashion model
- Yui Ohashi (大橋 悠依; born 1995), Japanese swimmer
- Yui Okada (岡田 唯, born 1987), member of the J-pop group v-u-den
- Yui Sakakibara (榊原ゆい, born 1978), Japanese singer, voice actress, choreographer and dancer
- Yui Sunami (角南 唯; born 1991), Japanese handball player
- Yui Yabuta (藪田 裕衣; born 1996), Japanese long-distance runner
- Yui Yamane (山根 優衣; born 1994), Japanese swimmer
- Yui Yokoyama (横山 由依; born 1992), Japanese actress

With the surname Yui

- Kimiya Yui (油井 亀美也, born 1970), Japanese astronaut
- Kiyoo Yui (油井 潔雄; born 1943), Japanese hurdler
- Noriko Yui, Japanese-Canadian professor of mathematics
- Yui Shōsetsu (由井 正雪, 1605–1651), Japanese military strategist
- Toshiki Yui (唯 登詩樹, born 1956), Japanese manga artist

== Fictional characters ==
=== With the given name Yui ===
- Yui (ゆい), the protagonist in Indian Summer manga
- Yui Yoshioka (芳岡 ユイ), a character in Angel Beats
- Yui, from the Papa Louie video games
- Fai D. Flowright, also known as Yūi (ユゥイ), a character in Tsubasa: Reservoir Chronicle
- Yui Funami (船見 結衣), one of the main characters in an anime and manga series YuruYuri
- Yui Furukawa (古川 ゆい), a character in the anime and manga series Ushinawareta Mirai o Motomete
- Yui Hirasawa (平沢 唯), a character in the anime and manga series K-On!
- Yui Hongō (本郷 唯), a character in Fushigi Yûgi
- Yui Ichii (櫟井 唯), one of the main characters in the anime and manga Yuyushiki
- Yui Ikari (碇 ユイ), a character in Neon Genesis Evangelion
- Yui Inaba (稲羽 結衣), a character in the visual novel Flyable Heart
- Yui Kanzaki (神崎 優衣), a character in Kamen Rider Ryuki
- Yui Kasuga (春日 結), the main character in Corrector Yui
- Yui Kimura (木村 結衣), a survivor in Dead by Daylight
- Yui Kiriyama (桐山 唯), one of the main characters in the novel, manga and anime series Kokoro Connect
- Yui Kodai (小大 唯), a character in My Hero Academia
- Yui Komori (小森 ユイ), the main character in Diabolik Lovers
- Yui Kotegawa (古手川 唯), a character in To Love-Ru
- Yui Kusanagi (草薙 結衣), the lead character in Kamigami no Asobi
- Yui Mamiya (間宮 由衣), a minor character in Lost Judgment
- Yui-MHCP001, a character in the light novel series Sword Art Online
- Yui Michimiya (道宮 結), a character in Haikyu!!
- Yui Midorikawa (緑川 ゆい), a character in the anime series Smile PreCure! (known as Nina Swanson in English)
- Yui Minamito (南戸 唯), a character in Strawberry 100%
- Yui Nagomi (和実 ゆい), one of the characters in Delicious Party Pretty Cure
- Yui Nanase (七瀬 ゆい), a supporting character in Go! Princess PreCure
- Yui Narumi (成実 ゆい), a character in the Lucky Star series
- Yui Rio, a character in the video game Yandere Simulator
- Yui Samidare (五月雨 結), the main character in Danganronpa Kirigiri
- Yui Shishido (宍戸 結衣), character in the Corpse Party series
- Yui Tabata (田端 ゆい), a character in H_{2}O: Footprints in the Sand
- Yui Takamura (篁 唯依), a character in Muv-Luv Alternative: Total Eclipse
- Yui Toba (鳥羽 ゆい), a character in B-Fighter Kabuto
- Yui Yuigahama (由比ヶ浜 結衣), a character in My Teen Romantic Comedy SNAFU
- Yui Yumekawa (夢川 ゆい), a character in Idol Time PriPara
- Yui Uehara (上原 由衣), a character in Detective Conan

=== With the surname Yui ===
- Meroko Yui (めろこ・ユイ), a character in Full Moon o Sagashite
- Heero Yuy (ヒイロ・ユイ), the lead character in Mobile Suit Gundam Wing
- Yui Kodai a character in the Boku No Hero Academia and a student in class 1B.
- Tsuruno Yui (由比鶴乃), a main character in the Puella Magi Madoka Magica spinoff Magia Record

== See also ==
- Yui (disambiguation)
- Youyi (name)
