= Yuancun station =

Yuancun station may refer to:

- Yuancun station (Guangzhou Metro), a station on Line 5 and Line 11 of Guangzhou Metro
- Yuancun station (Shijiazhuang Metro), a station on Line 2 of Shijiazhuang Metro
