= Line 3 (Shijiazhuang Metro) =

Metro line in Shijiazhuang, China

- 3
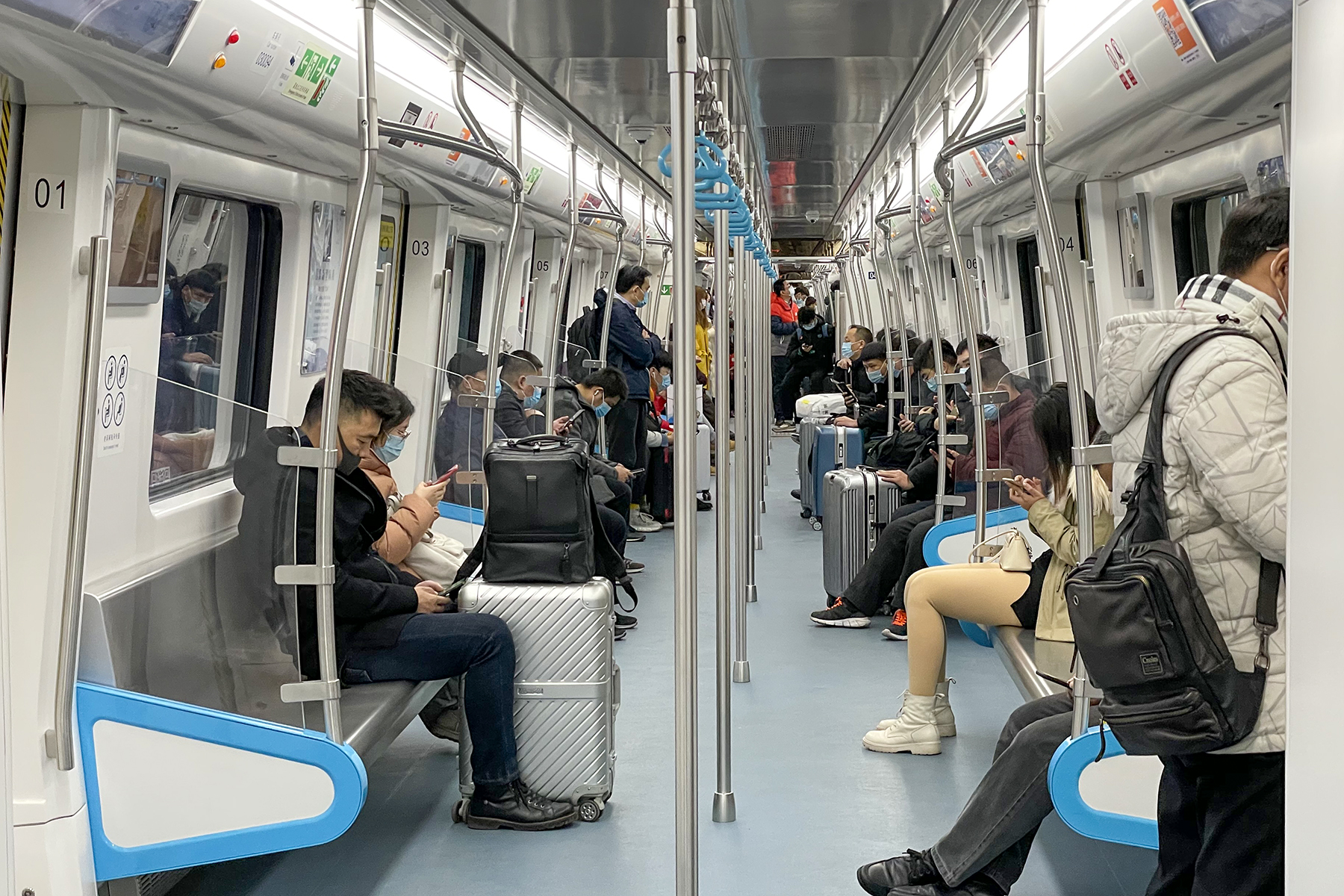

Overview
- Status: Operational
- Owner: Shijiazhuang
- Locale: Shijiazhuang, Hebei, China
- Termini: Xisanzhuang; Lexiang
- Stations: 22

Service
- Type: Rapid transit
- System: Shijiazhuang Metro
- Services: 1
- Operator(s): Shijiazhuang Metro Corporation

History
- Opened: 26 June 2017; 7 years ago

Technical
- Line length: 26.7 km (16.6 mi)
- Number of tracks: 2
- Character: Underground
- Track gauge: 1,435 mm (4 ft 8 1/2 in)

Line 3 of the Shijiazhuang Metro (Chinese: 石家庄地铁三号线; pinyin: Shíjiāzhuāng Dìtiě Sān Hào Xiàn) is a rapid transit line in Shijiazhuang. It was officially open on 26 June 2017. The line is currently 26.7 km long with 22 stations.

== Opening timeline ==
Segment	Commencement	Length	Station(s)	Name
Shierzhong — Shijiazhuangzhan	26 June 2017	6.4 km (4.0 mi)	6	Phase 1 (initial section)
Xisanzhuang — Shierzhong	20 January 2020	5.4 km (3.4 mi)	4	Phase 1 (Northern section)
Shijiazhuangzhan — Lexiang	6 April 2021	14.9 km (9.3 mi)	12	Phase 1 (Eastern section) & Phase 2

== Stations ==
Station name		Connections	Distance km	Location
English	Chinese	Connections	Distance km	Location
Xisanzhuang	西三庄			Xinhua
Gaozhu	高柱			Xinhua
Bailinzhuang	柏林庄			Xinhua
Shizhuang	市庄			Xinhua
Shierzhong	市二中			Xinhua
Xinbaiguangchang	新百广场	1		Qiaoxi
Dongli	东里			Qiaoxi
Huai'anqiao	槐安桥			Qiaoxi
Xisanjiao	西三教			Qiaoxi
Shijiazhuangzhan	石家庄站	SJP 2		Qiaoxi/Yuhua
Huitonglu	汇通路			Qiaoxi/Yuhua
Suncun	孙村			Yuhua
Tazhong	塔冢			Yuhua
Dongwang	东王			Yuhua
Nanwang	南王			Yuhua
Weitong	位同			Yuhua
Dong'erhuannanlu	东二环南路			Yuhua
Xiyangling	西仰陵			Yuhua
Zhongyangling	中仰陵			Yuhua
Nandou	南豆			Yuhua
Taihangnandajie	太行南大街			Yuhua
Lexiang	乐乡			Gaocheng
