= Fangcun =

Fangcun may refer to the following in China:

- Fangcun, Guangzhou (芳村), area of Guangzhou that formerly constituted Fangcun District
- Fangcun, Anhui (方村镇), town in Jinghu District, Wuhu
- Fangcun, Hebei (方村镇), town in Yuhua District, Shijiazhuang
- Fangcun, Jiangsu (房村镇), town in Tongshan District, Xuzhou
- Fangcun, Shandong (房村镇), town in Daiyue District, Tai'an
- Fangcun, Zhejiang (芳村镇), town in Zhejiang
