= Dongyuan =

Dongyuan may refer to the following locations in China:

- Dongyuan County (东源县), Heyuan, Guangdong
- Dongyuan railway station (东园站), station on the Beijing–Baotou Railway in Beijing
- Dongyuan (Hebei), a former town in Zhengding County, Hebei
- Dongyuan, Zhejiang (东源镇), town in Qingtian County
- Dongyuan Subdistrict, Shijiazhuang (东苑街道), in Yuhua District, Shijiazhuang, Hebei
- Dongyuan Subdistrict, Harbin (东原街道), in Daowai District, Harbin, Heilongjiang
- Dongyuan Subdistrict, Fuxin (东苑街道), in Xihe District, Fuxin, Liaoning

== See also ==
- Dong Yuan (c. 934 – c. 962), Chinese painter
