= Shijiazhuang Metro =

Rapid transit system in Shijiazhuang, China

Overview
- Locale: Shijiazhuang, Hebei, China
- Transit type: Rapid transit
- Number of lines: 3
- Number of stations: 63
- Website: http://www.sjzmetro.cn/

Operation
- Began operation: 26 June 2017; 9 years ago

Technical
- System length: 76.5 km (47.5 mi)
- Track gauge: 1,435 mm (4 ft 8 1/2 in) standard gauge
System map

The Shijiazhuang Metro (Chinese: 石家庄地铁; branded as SJZ Metro) is the rapid transit system serving the city of Shijiazhuang, the capital of Hebei Province, China.

== Network ==
Shijiazhuang Metro System Map

Line	Terminals (District or County)		Commencement	Newest Extension	Length km	Stations
1	Xiwang (Qiaoxi)	Fuze (Zhengding)	June 26, 2017	June 26, 2019	34.3	26
2	Liuxinzhuang (Chang'an)	Jiahualu (Yuhua)	August 26, 2020	—	15.5	15
3	Xisanzhuang (Xinhua)	Lexiang (Gaocheng)	June 26, 2017	April 6, 2021	26.7	22
Total					76.5	63

=== Line 1 ===
Line 1 opened on 26 June 2017. It is 34.3 kilometers in length with 26 underground stations.

=== Line 2 ===
Line 2 opened on 26 August 2020. It is 15.5 kilometers in length with 15 underground stations.

=== Line 3 ===
Line 3 opened on 26 June 2017. It is 26.7 kilometers in length with 22 underground stations.

== Background ==
Planning and preparation for construction began in 2001 and 2008 respectively, but was delayed due to the world economic crisis. The projected was approved by National Development and Reform Commission and included in the urban rail development project 2012–2020. Construction of the first metro station at the Shijiazhuang railway station started in September 2012. Construction at other sites began on 14 May 2013.

Lines 1, 2 and 3 have, in total, 52 stations, 59.1 km length and will cost 42.19 billion yuan to construct. Phase 1 of Line 1, has 20 stations and is 23.9 km in length. Phase 2 of Line 1 has 8 stations and is 13.495 km in length. Only 6 stations in Phase 2, from Xiaohedadao to Fuze (10.4 km) are operational. Line 3, has 22 stations and is 26.7 km in length. Line 2, has 15 stations and is 15.5 km in length. It was opened on 26 August 2020.

Line 1 runs from west to east and then to the north of city. Line 3 runs from north-west to south-east and then eastwards. Each line intersects other two. Lines 1 and 3 intersects at Xinbaiguangchang. The stations of these two lines were named in January 2013. Line 2 runs from north to south.

== Future development ==
There will be 63.6 km of new lines in the Phase 2 construction plan of Shijiazhuang Metro, including Line 1 (Phase 3), Line 4, Line 5 (Phase 1), Line 6 (Phase 1).

Line	Terminals		Length km	Stations	Opening	Reference
1 (Phase 2 North section)	Fuze	Dongyang	3.1	2	2026	
1 (Phase 3)	Xiwang	Huai'anlu	3.74	2	2026	
4 (Phase 1)	Yucunnanlu	Dongyuandonglu	22.4	20	2027	
5 (Phase 1)	Gongbeilu	Tangubeidajie	19.9	19	2028	
6 (Phase 1)	Jianhuanandajie	Dongzuolu	15.76	11	2027	
