= Line 1 (Shijiazhuang Metro) =

Metro line in Shijiazhuang, China

- 1

Overview
- Status: Operational
- Owner: Shijiazhuang
- Locale: Shijiazhuang, Hebei, China
- Termini: Xiwang - Fuze (current); Huai'anlu - Dongyang (future)
- Stations: 26 (current); 30 (future)

Service
- Type: Rapid transit
- System: Shijiazhuang Metro
- Services: 1
- Operator(s): Shijiazhuang Metro Corporation

History
- Opened: 26 June 2017; 8 years ago

Technical
- Line length: 34.3 km (21.3 mi) (current)
- Number of tracks: 2
- Character: Underground
- Track gauge: 1,435 mm (4 ft 8 1/2 in)

Line 1 of the Shijiazhuang Metro (Chinese: 石家庄地铁一号线; pinyin: Shíjiāzhuāng Dìtiě Yī Hào Xiàn) is a rapid transit line in Shijiazhuang, Hebei province, China. Currently it is 34.3 km (21.3 mi) long with 26 stations. The line opened on 26 June 2017.

== History ==
Phase 1

Phase 1 of the line began construction on 1 July 2013 and began service on 26 June 2017, completed at a cost of ¥18.892 billion.

Phase 2 initial section

The Phase II of Line 1 is 13.495 km (8.4 mi) with 8 stations. Only 6 stations from Xiaohedadao to Fuze (10.4 km) opened on 26 June 2019.

Phase 2 North section

Two more stations, Dongshangze and Dongyang will open later. The section is 3.1 km in length with 2 stations. The section will open in 2024.

Phase 3 (Southwest extension)

The Phase 3 will add two more stations (Huai'anlu and Shangzhuang) in Southwest of the line. The extension is under planning.

=== Opening timeline ===
Segment	Commencement	Length	Station(s)	Name
Xiwang — Xiaohedadao	26 June 2017	23.9 km (14.9 mi)	20	Phase 1
Xiaohedadao — Fuze	26 June 2019	10.4 km (6.5 mi)	6	Phase 2 (initial section)

== Stations ==
Phase	Station name		Connections	Distance km	Location
Phase	English	Chinese	Connections	Distance km	Location
Phase 3	Huai'anlu	槐安路			Luquan
Phase 3	Shangzhuang	上庄			Luquan
Phase 1	Xiwang	西王			Qiaoxi
Phase 1	Shiguangjie	时光街			Qiaoxi
Phase 1	Changchengqiao	长城桥			Qiaoxi
Phase 1	Hepingyiyuan	和平医院			Qiaoxi
Phase 1	Lieshilingyuan	烈士陵园			Qiaoxi
Phase 1	Xinbaiguangchang	新百广场	3		Qiaoxi
Phase 1	Jiefangguangchang	解放广场			Qiaoxi/Xinhua
Phase 1	Ping'andajie	平安大街			Qiaoxi/Chang'an
Phase 1	Beiguoshangcheng	北国商城	2		Qiaoxi/Chang'an
Phase 1	Bowuyuan	博物院			Chang'an
Phase 1	Tiyuchang	体育场			Chang'an
Phase 1	Beisong	北宋			Chang'an
Phase 1	Tangu	谈固			Chang'an
Phase 1	Zhaohuiqiao	朝晖桥			Chang'an
Phase 1	Baifo	白佛			Chang'an
Phase 1	Liucun	留村			Yuhua
Phase 1	Huojuguangchang	火炬广场			Yuhua
Phase 1	Shijiazhuangdongzhan	石家庄东站	SXP		Yuhua
Phase 1	Nancun	南村			Chang'an
Phase 1	Xiaohedadao	洨河大道			Chang'an
Phase 2	Xizhuang	西庄			Chang'an
Phase 2	Dongzhuang	东庄			Chang'an
Phase 2	Huizhanzhongxin	会展中心			Zhengding
Phase 2	Shangwuzhongxin	商务中心			Zhengding
Phase 2	Yuanboyuan	园博园			Zhengding
Phase 2	Fuze	福泽			Zhengding
Phase 2	Dongshangze	东上泽			Zhengding
Phase 2	Dongyang	东洋			Zhengding

== Rolling stock ==
Services are provided by CRRC Tangshan Type A rolling stock, which are operated in six-car sets that hold up to 2520 passengers each.
