= Yuxi Subdistrict =

Yuxi Subdistrict may refer to the following locations in China:

- Yuxi Subdistrict, Huangshan (昱西街道), in Tunxi District, Huangshan City, Anhui
- Yuxi Subdistrict, Shijiazhuang (裕西街道), in Qiaoxi District, Shijiazhuang, Hebei
