= Yui =

Yui or YUI may refer to:

== People ==
- Yui (name), a Japanese name including fictional characters
- Yui people or Ibi, a Timucuan-speaking people in what now is Georgia, United States

== Places ==
- Yui, Shizuoka, a former town located in Shizuoka, Japan
- Yui Station, a railway station on the Tōkaidō Main Line in Shizuoka

== Other ==
- YUI Library, an open-source JavaScript and CSS library
- Corrector Yui, a 1999 magical girl series
- Yui Rail, an alternate name for the Okinawa Urban Monorail
