= Hongqi Subdistrict, Shijiazhuang =

Hongqi Subdistrict 红旗街道
- Subdistrict
- Location in Hebei
- Coordinates: 38°01′49″N 114°27′14″E
- Country: People's Republic of China
- Province: Hebei
- Prefecture-level city: Shijiazhuang
- District: Qiaoxi
- Village-level divisions: 8 residential communities
- Elevation: 76 m (249 ft)
- Time zone: UTC+8 (China Standard)
- Postal code: 050081
- Area code: 0311

Hongqi Subdistrict (simplified Chinese: 红旗街道; traditional Chinese: 紅旗街道; pinyin: Hóngqí Jiēdào; lit. 'red flag') is a subdistrict of Qiaoxi District, in the southwest of Shijiazhuang, Hebei, People's Republic of China. As of 2011, it has 8 residential communities (居委会) under its administration.

== See also ==
- List of township-level divisions of Hebei
