= Liuying Subdistrict =

Liuying Subdistrict 留营街道
- Subdistrict
- Location in Hebei
- Coordinates: 38°03′12″N 114°25′25″E
- Country: People's Republic of China
- Province: Hebei
- Prefecture-level city: Shijiazhuang
- District: Qiaoxi
- Village-level divisions: 6 residential communities 5 villages
- Elevation: 85 m (279 ft)
- Time zone: UTC+8 (China Standard)
- Area code: 0311

Liuying Subdistrict (simplified Chinese: 留营街道; traditional Chinese: 留營街道; pinyin: Liúyíng Jiēdào) is a subdistrict of Qiaoxi District, in the western outskirts of Shijiazhuang, Hebei, People's Republic of China. As of 2011, it has six residential communities (社区) and five villages under its administration.

== See also ==
- List of township-level divisions of Hebei
