= Yuhua Road Subdistrict =

Coordinates: 38°02′01″N 114°30′41″E

Yuhua Road Subdistrict 裕华路街道
- Subdistrict

Chinese transcription(s)
- Interactive map of Yuhua Road Subdistrict
- Country: China
- Province: Hebei
- Prefecture: Shijiazhuang
- District: Yuhua District
- Time zone: UTC+8 (China Standard Time)

Yuhua Road Subdistrict (Chinese: 裕华路街道) is a township-level division of Yuhua District, Shijiazhuang, Hebei, China.

== See also ==
- List of township-level divisions of Hebei
