= Yuandong Subdistrict =

Coordinates: 38°01′51″N 114°24′24″E

Yuandong Subdistrict 苑东街道
- Subdistrict

Chinese transcription(s)
- Interactive map of Yuandong Subdistrict
- Country: China
- Province: Hebei
- Prefecture: Shijiazhuang
- District: Qiaoxi District
- Time zone: UTC+8 (China Standard Time)

Yuandong Subdistrict (Chinese: 苑东街道) is a township-level division of Qiaoxi District, Shijiazhuang, Hebei, China.

== See also ==
- List of township-level divisions of Hebei
