= Zhongshan Road Subdistrict, Shijiazhuang =

Coordinates: 38°02′29″N 114°28′40″E

Zhongshan Road Subdistrict 中山街道
- Subdistrict

Chinese transcription(s)
- Interactive map of Zhongshan Road Subdistrict
- Country: China
- Province: Hebei
- Prefecture: Shijiazhuang
- District: Qiaoxi District
- Time zone: UTC+8 (China Standard Time)

Zhongshan Road Subdistrict (Chinese: 中山街道) is a township-level division of Qiaoxi District, Shijiazhuang, Hebei, China.

== See also ==
- List of township-level divisions of Hebei
