= Kia Asamiya =

Japanese character designer and manga artist

- 麻宮 騎亜
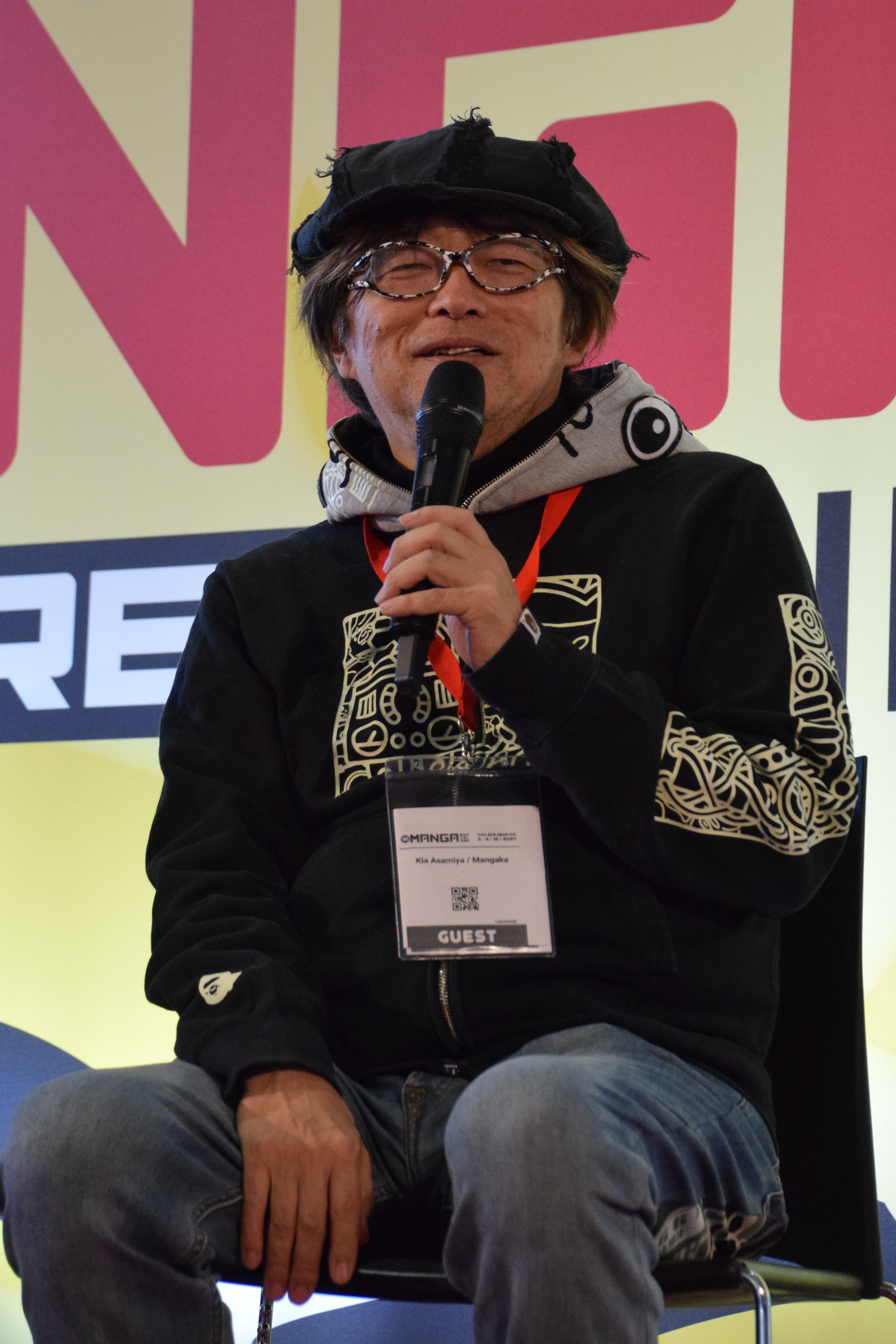
- Born: Kikuchi Michitaka (菊池 通隆); March 9, 1963 (age 63); Kitakami, Iwate Prefecture, Japan
- Occupation: Manga artist
- Years active: 1986–present
- Website: www.tron.co.jp (in Japanese)

Michitaka Kikuchi (菊池 通隆, Kikuchi Michitaka; born March 9, 1963), best known by the pen name Kia Asamiya (麻宮 騎亜, Asamiya Kia), is a Japanese manga artist whose work spans multiple genres and appeals to diverse audiences.

== Biography ==
Before becoming a manga artist, Asamiya graduated from the Tokyo Designer School, then worked as a character designer for a number of anime series, and even designed models for some of the later Godzilla films (1980s). For this career, he used his real name, and maintained the two professional identities separately for many years. Several of the anime series that he worked on were very popular inside and outside Japan, most notably Sonic Soldier Borgman and Project A-ko. Even after focusing primarily on his manga career, Asamiya continued to do character designs and creative consultation on anime series based on his stories, occasionally under the Kikuchi name.

In the early 2000s, Asamiya shifted his focus from teenage and young-adult stories to stories designed for children and for an American audience. In the former case, he credits his children as a motivation but, in the latter case, he points to a long-standing desire to work with his favorite American characters. To that end, he has worked on projects with Image Comics, Marvel Comics, and DC Comics, with projects such as Batman: Child of Dreams, as well as developing a manga adaptation of the film Star Wars: Episode I – The Phantom Menace.

He is well known for using influences from American comics, television, and films in his work, and describes himself as a big fan of Batman and Star Wars. One of the most widely published Japanese manga artist, nearly all of his stories have been translated into other languages, including English. His two most successful and popular manga series to-date are Martian Successor Nadesico and Silent Möbius.

While many Japanese artists (and artists in general) are quite reclusive, Asamiya often makes an effort to be available to his fans. He maintains a website with news and information about his studio, TRON (named after the Disney film Tron). He aids and assists his official fan club by sending them regular announcements and limited-edition merchandise. Despite these actions, he shunned all public photography and had the habit of depicting himself with a placeholder sign for a face. It has become a trademark feature of his books that instead of a picture of the artist, there is an elaborately decorated rectangle sporting the words "Now Printing" (a message used in Japan for placeholder images).

In 2025, Asamiya would be a recipient of the Inkpot Award at the annual San Diego Comic Con.

== Works ==
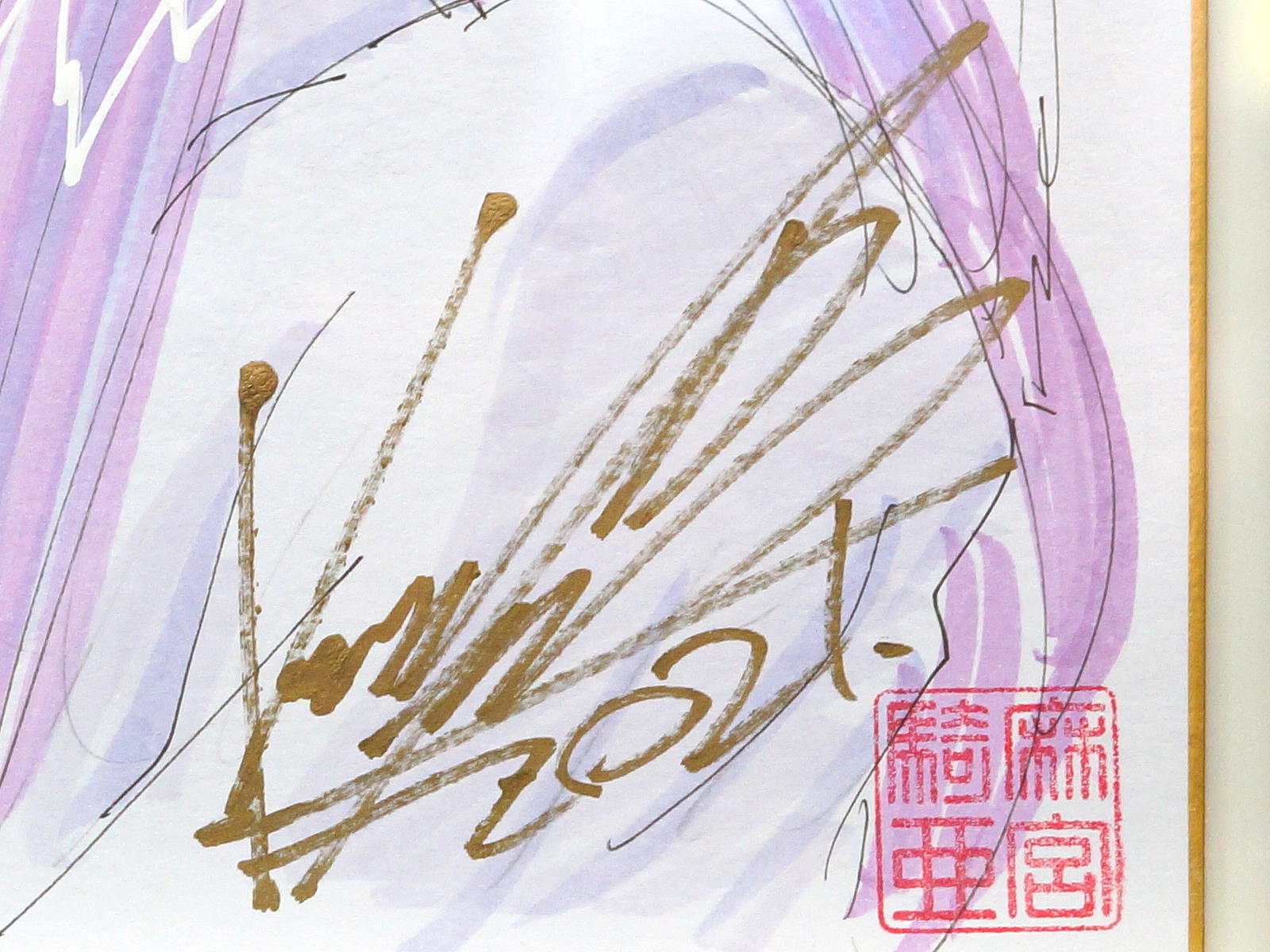
Kia Asamiya's signature at Ichiban Japan 20210207

=== Manga ===
- Shin Seiki Vagrants (1986–1988)
- Silent Möbius (1989–1999)
  - Silent Möbius Klein (1994)—prequel
  - Silent Möbius Tales (2003)
  - Silent Möbius QD (2013–2018)
- Gunhed (1990)—adaptation of the film
- Compiler (1990–1992)
- Assembler 0X (1992–1995)
- Dark Angel (1992–1997)
  - Dark Angel: Phoenix Resurrection (2001–2002)
- Steam Detectives (1994–2000)
  - New Steam Detectives (2001–2003)
- Martian Successor Nadesico (1996–1999)
- Corrector Yui (1999–2000)
- Star Wars: Episode I – The Phantom Menace (1999)—adaptation of the film
- Batman: Child of Dreams (2000–2001)
- Gacha Gacha Family Ebiru-Kun (2000–2001)
- D-Divine (2001)
- Color Pri (2004)
- Junk: Record of the Last Hero (2004–2007)
- My Favorite Carrera (2004–2012)
  - Kanojo no Carrera RS (2013–2015)
- Zero Angel -Sōheki no Datenshi (2016–2018)
- 太陽系SF冒険大全 スペオペ！ (SPEOPE!) (2019–)

=== American comics ===
- The Titans (2001) #32, 33, 36 Covers Only
- Star Wars Tales (2001, 2002) #8 Cover only, #11 "Prey" Story & Art
- Marvel Double Shot (2002) Vol 1. #1 Art
- Captain Marvel (2002) Vol. 2, #2 Cover Only
- X-Men: Evolution (2002) #6
- Iron Man (2002) Vol. 3, #55 Cover Only
- Fantastic Four (2002) Vol. 3 #59 Cover Only
- Avengers (2002) Vol 3. #60
- New X-Men (2003) #134 co-artist
- Uncanny X-Men (2003) #416-420 art
- Hellboy: Weird Tales (2004) #8 "Toy Soldier" Co-Writer & Artist
- Star Wars Tokyopop (2006) #1-2 Covers Only
- Civil War (2015) #3 Cover Only
- Monsters Unleashed (2017) Vol.2 #2 Cover Only
- Old Man Logan (2017) #21 Cover Only
- Marvel Comics (2019) #1000 co-artist
- Ultraman (2021) #5 Cover Only
- The Trials of Ultraman (2021) #1 Cover Only
- Batman (2023) Volume 3 #138; Variant Cover Only

=== Other works ===
- Detonator Orgun (character design: as Michitaka Kikuchi)
- Kamen Rider Fourze (Zodiarts design)
- Sonic Soldier Borgman (character design: as Michitaka Kikuchi)
- White Diamond (game designs for main characters)
- Xenoblade Chronicles 2 (Vess/Musubi character design)
- Kantai Collection (Lexington character design)

=== Video game intros ===
- Crash Fever (Malthus)
