= Line 2 (Shijiazhuang Metro) =

Metro line in Shijiazhuang, China

- 2
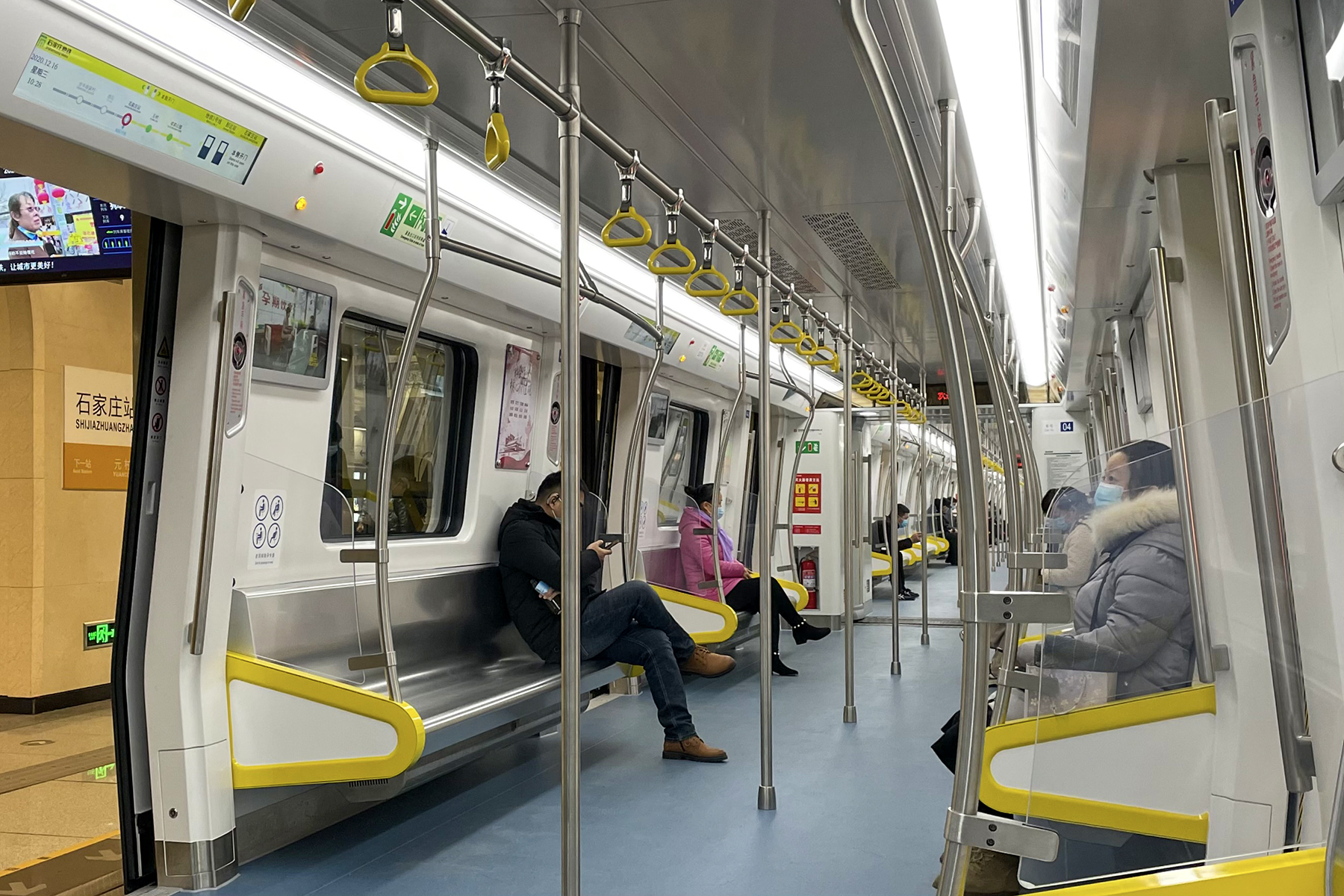

Overview
- Status: Operational
- Owner: Shijiazhuang
- Locale: Shijiazhuang, Hebei, China
- Termini: Liuxinzhuang; Jiahualu
- Stations: 15

Service
- Type: Rapid transit
- System: Shijiazhuang Metro
- Services: 1
- Operator(s): Shijiazhuang Metro Corporation

History
- Opened: 26 August 2020

Technical
- Line length: 15.5 km (9.6 mi)
- Number of tracks: 2
- Character: Underground
- Track gauge: 1,435 mm (4 ft 8 1/2 in)

Line 2 of the Shijiazhuang Metro (Chinese: 石家庄地铁二号线; pinyin: Shíjiāzhuāng Dìtiě Èr Hào Xiàn) is a rapid transit line in Shijiazhuang. The line is 15.5 km (9.6 mi) long with 15 stations. It was opened on 26 August 2020.

== Opening timeline ==
Segment	Commencement	Length	Station(s)	Name
Liuxinzhuang — Jiahualu	26 August 2020	15.5 km (9.6 mi)	15	Phase 1

== Stations ==
Station name		Connections	Distance km	Location
English	Chinese	Connections	Distance km	Location
Liuxinzhuang	柳辛庄			Chang'an
Zhuangke · Tiedaodaxue	庄窠·铁道大学			Chang'an
Yitang	义堂			Chang'an
Jianheqiao	建和桥			Chang'an
Chang'angongyuan	长安公园			Chang'an
Beiguoshangcheng	北国商城	1		Chang'an
Yuhualu	裕华路			Qiaoxi/Yuhua
Huaizhonglu	槐中路			Qiaoxi/Yuhua
Ouyungongyuan	欧韵公园			Qiaoxi/Yuhua
Yuancun	元村			Qiaoxi
Shijiazhuangzhan	石家庄站	SJP; 3		Qiaoxi
Tatan	塔谈			Qiaoxi/Yuhua
Cangfengluliucun	仓丰路留村			Qiaoxi/Yuhua
Nanwei	南位			Qiaoxi/Yuhua
Jiahualu	嘉华路			Qiaoxi/Yuhua
