= Xinshi Subdistrict, Shijiazhuang =

Coordinates: 38°00′38″N 114°28′04″E

Xinshi Subdistrict 新石街道
- Subdistrict

Chinese transcription(s)
- Interactive map of Xinshi Subdistrict
- Country: China
- Province: Hebei
- Prefecture: Shijiazhuang
- District: Qiaoxi District
- Time zone: UTC+8 (China Standard Time)

Xinshi Subdistrict (Chinese: 新石街道) is a township-level division of Qiaoxi District, Shijiazhuang, Hebei, China.

== See also ==
- List of township-level divisions of Hebei
