= Silent Möbius =

Japanese manga and its adaptations

- Volume 12 of the VIZ Media release, portraying the entire AMP

サイレントメビウス (Sairento Mebiusu)
- Genre: Science fiction
- Manga
- Written by: Kia Asamiya
- Published by: Fujimi Shobo
- English publisher: NA: Udon Entertainment; Viz Media (previous)
- Magazine: Comic Dragon
- Original run: 1989 – 1999
- Volumes: 12
- Anime film series
- Directed by: Kazuo Tomizawa (#1); Yasunori Ide (#2)
- Produced by: Haruki Kadokawa; Keishi Yamazaki; Tōru Miura
- Written by: Kei Shigema (#1); Manabu Nakamura (#2)
- Music by: Kaoru Wada
- Studio: AIC
- Licensed by: NA: Streamline Pictures Bandai Entertainment
- Released: August 17, 1991 – July 18, 1992
- Runtime: 54 minutes (#1); 58 minutes (#2)
- Films: 2
- Manga

Möbius Klein
- Written by: Kia Asamiya
- Published by: MediaWorks
- English publisher: NA: Udon Entertainment
- Magazine: Dengeki Comics EX
- Published: 1994
- Volumes: 1
- Anime television series
- Directed by: Hideki Tonokatsu; Nobuyuki Takeuchi
- Produced by: Shinjirō Yokoyama; Tōru Shimose; Makiko Iwata (#1–15); Kaoru Saitō (#16–26)
- Written by: Hiroyuki Kawasaki; Hideki Tonokatsu
- Music by: Jimmie Haskell; Suzie Katayama; Kenichi Sudō; Jamie Nakamura
- Studio: Radix; Shaft (Note: Shaft is credited for both production assistance (プロダクション協力) and work assistance (制作協力), but studio producer Mitsutoshi Kubota states that the director worked in-house at Shaft rather than Radix, and that Shaft's production staff were in charge of selecting staff for the work. Zero-G Room co-produced the first episode with Shaft (credited as "production assistance") and produced three other episodes outsourced to them by Radix. Zero-G Room were also responsible for all animation corrections and "Retakes" in the DVD release, credited as "retake staff / work assistance.")
- Licensed by: NA: Bandai Entertainment
- Original network: TXN (TV Tokyo)
- English network: US: TechTV (Anime Unleashed)
- Original run: 7 April 1998 – 29 September 1998
- Episodes: 26
- Video game

Silent Möbius: Genei no Datenshi
- Developer: TechnoSoft
- Publisher: Bandai Visual
- Genre: Graphic adventure, role-playing video game
- Platform: PlayStation
- Released: December 23, 1998
- Manga

Silent Möbius Tales
- Written by: Kia Asamiya
- Published by: Square Enix
- English publisher: NA: Udon Entertainment
- Magazine: Monthly GFantasy
- Original run: 2003 – 2003
- Volumes: 2
- Manga

Silent Möbius QD
- Written by: Kia Asamiya
- Published by: Kodansha
- Magazine: Monthly Young Magazine
- Original run: August 12, 2013 – June 20, 2018
- Volumes: 5
- icon

Silent Möbius (Japanese: サイレントメビウス, Hepburn: Sairento Mebiusu) is a twelve-volume manga series written and illustrated by Kia Asamiya. The series ran for 12 volumes from 1989 to 1999. It is centered on the lives of an all-female group of police officers dedicated to protecting Tokyo from an invasion of extra-dimensional creatures called Lucifer Hawks.

The series has been adapted into animation twice, first as a pair of films from 1991 to 1992 and later as a 26-episode television series in 1998. The first film was dubbed in English and released in the United States by Streamline Pictures, which was followed by a release of the entire anime by Bandai Entertainment with an English dub from Ocean Productions. The series also was adapted into the Japan-exclusive J-RPG Silent Möbius: Genei no Datenshi for the PlayStation in 1998, featuring an original plot.

A new manga series entitled Silent Möbius QD began in 2013 as a sequel to the original series and concluded in 2019 after five volumes.

== Plot ==
In 1999, Gigelf Liqueur, aided by the Magician's Guild, set into motion a plan to open a gate between Earth and the world of Nemesis. The intent was to exchange Earth's polluted air and water with clean air and water from Nemesis. To aid in this endeavor, a huge cyclotron was built under Tokyo. However, Ganossa Maximilian, Gigelf's old apprentice, sabotaged the plan by opening the gate early and perverting the gate for his own means. For a number of years following this event, Gigelf and the Magician's Guild battled an invasion of Lucifer Hawk, their name for the inhabitants of Nemesis. Gigelf was killed in 2006 and it appeared the rest of the Guild met with similar fates over the next few years.

In 2023, Rally Cheyenne felt partially responsible for the growing attacks on innocent humans by marauding creatures from Nemesis. She is of mixed heritage because her mother Lufa Cheyenne was a Magician's Guild member but her father was from Nemesis. Rally started the organization called the Attacked Mystification Police (AMP), with only three officers (Kiddy Phenil, Lebia Maverick, and Nami Yamigumo) and a sub-commander (Mana Isozaki). Over the next few years, she added Yuki Saiko, Katsumi Liqueur, and Lum Cheng to the team, all aiding in the fight to protect Earth from the vicious Lucifer Hawk.

== Characters ==
=== Attacked Mystification Police Department ===
The Attacked Mystification Police Department (AMP) is a branch of the Tokyo police force formed specifically to fight the Lucifer Hawk, and has the powerful pursuit aircraft the Simurgh at their disposal.

Rally Cheyenne (ラリー・シャイアン)
Voiced by: Toshiko Fujita (Japanese); Melora Harte (English, Streamline); Marcy Goldberg (English, Ocean)
Rally is the founder and chief of the AMP. She is quite powerful because she is half-human and half–Lucifer Hawk.
Mana Izosaki (磯崎真奈(いそざき まな))
Voiced by: Mami Koyama (Japanese); Caroline Savenkoff (English, Ocean)
Mana is the section chief of the AMP who joined in 2028 and is a powerful sorceress.
Katsumi Liqueur (かつみ リキュール)
Voiced by: Naoko Matsui (Japanese); Iona Morris (English, Streamline); Nicole Oliver (English, Ocean)
Katsumi was recruited into the AMP to become their main weapon against the Lucifer Hawk of Nemesis.
Lebia Maverick (レビア・マーベリック)
Voiced by: Miho Nagahori (Japanese); Barbara Goodson (English, Streamline); Ellen Kennedy (English, Ocean)
The AMP's second in command.
Kiddy Phenil (キディ・フェニル)
Voiced by: Hiromi Tsuru (Japanese); Joyce Kurtz (English, Streamline); Lisa Ann Beley (English, Ocean)
Kiddy is a former special detective who is part cyborg. She is physically the strongest in AMP. She presents a gruff exterior and acts manly and mean, but is a caring person and falls in love with Ralph Bowmers.
Nami Yamigumo (闇雲那魅(やみぐも なみ))
Voiced by: Chieko Honda (Japanese); Wendee Lee (English, Streamline); Nicole Amos (English, Ocean)
A Shinto priestess.
Yuki Saiko (彩弧由貴(さいこ ゆき))
Voiced by: Maya Okamoto (Japanese); Juliana Donald (English, Streamline); Kelly Sheridan (English, Ocean)
Yuki is a young psychic. She is a keen cook and runs her own cafe.
Lum Cheng (藍菁(ラム・チェン))
Voiced by: Akiko Hiramatsu (Japanese); Nicole Oliver (English, Ocean)
Lum originates from Neo Clone in Hong Kong. Still young, Lum can be immature and act rashly during battle, however her naïveté helps bind the AMP members.
Kenuo Grosspoliner
Voiced by: Kiyoshi Kawakubo (Japanese); Don Brown (English, Ocean)
Grosspoliner, also known as The Sword Emperor or the King of Swords, is a sapient weapon, and once belonged to Gigelf Liqueur. It has the ability to speak and change form, and folds into a skull-like shape when not active. It was locked away in an obelisk for 22 years and after it was freed by Katsumi Liqueur, it bonded itself to her.

=== Other characters ===
Robert (Roy) De Vice
Voiced by: Kōichi Hashimoto (Japanese); Barry Levy (English, Ocean)
Robert, also called Roy, is a Tokyo Police officer and becomes Katsumi's boyfriend. He and the other members of his squad were injected with small amounts of Dommel to increase their physical strength and reflexes. He is killed by Ganossa and his death drives Katsumi's conversion to evil.
Ralph Bowmers
Voiced by: Yasunori Matsumoto (Japanese); Paul Dobson (English, Ocean)
Ralph is a Tokyo Police officer in the Special Investigations Squad. Ralph was the officer investigating the Creature Trap and also the officer charged with bringing in Wire. He initially argues with Kiddy, but eventually falls in love with her.
Rosa Cheyenne (ローザ･シャイアン)
Voiced by: Gara Takashima (Japanese); Jenn Forgie (English, Ocean)
Rosa is Rally's younger sister and possesses similar abilities to Rally, but less powerful. Under Ganossa's influence, Rosa left for Nemesis and returned to try and destroy Rally. She appears to die and is released from her bondage after battling with her sister.
Maximilian Ganossa (ガノッサ・マクシミリアン)
Voiced by: Kaneto Shiozawa (Japanese); Trevor Devall (English, Ocean)
Maximilian Ganossa was involved in Project Gaia with Gigelf. Nemesis made him immortal and provided him with great power.
Lucifer Hawk (妖魔(ルシファーホーク))
Voiced by: Kôji Nakata (Japanese); Jeff Winkless (English, Streamline); Paul Dobson (English, Ocean)
Generic term for the more powerful types of Lucifer Folk from Nemesis, an Extra-dimensional world which is home to Lucifer Folk. Humans have categorized them into three different types based on their capabilities: Category 3 are most common, but low intelligence; Category 2 have some intelligence and can communicate through speech; Category 1 have status in Nemesis, can communicate through speech and are capable of independent thought. The Streamline dub of the first film rewrites Lucifer Hawk as an individual character instead of a species.

== Manga ==
The manga series started in 1989 and was published in the magazine Comic Dragon. It ended in 1999 after 12 volumes. In 2013, Asamiya began a new Silent Möbius series, titled Silent Möbius QD, which takes place 17 years after the original story. The manga finished on June 20, 2018.

It is published in English by Udon Entertainment; previously it was published in English by Viz Media.

== Adaptations ==
=== Films ===
Between 1991 and 1992, two animated film adaptions were produced by AIC. Part 1 was directed by Kazuo Tomizawa, and written by Kei Shigema. Part 2 was directed by Yasunori Ide and written by Manabu Nakamura. Kaoru Wada produced the scores for both series. Both films have been compiled into a single version in some releases.

No.	Title	Original airdate
1	"Silent Möbius: The Motion Picture" (Japanese: サイレントメビウス / THE MOTION PICTURE)	August 17, 1991
In the Tokyo of the future, Katsumi Liqueur and a special squad of policewomen fight a shape-changing monster called a Lucifer Hawk. In the aftermath of the battle, Katsumi recalls how it all started. In 2024 she traveled from Hawaii to Tokyo to visit her mother, Fuyuka, who was ill in hospital. On the way to the hospital, she was attacked by a monster, but was saved by two specialist policewomen. They took her to meets their chief, Rally Cheyenne, who wanted Katsumi to join her group, the Attacked Mystification Police Department (AMP). Katsumi refuses and does not want to be involved. However, when her mother later sacrifices herself to destroy a Lucifer Hawk, Fuyuka reveals that she sealed away Katsumi's inherited powers including the ability to control the super-dimensional gateway. Katsumi's power is released when she attacks and destroys Lucifer Hawk. The authorities blame the ensuing destruction on terrorist attacks, continuing to keep the existence of Lucifer Hawks secret.
2	"Silent Möbius 2" (Japanese: サイレントメビウス2)	July 18, 1992
Following the death of her mother fighting a Lucifer Hawk, Katsumi decides to return to Hawaii. Rally Cheyenne prevents her departure and tries to make her a member of the AMP, but Katsumi heads out on her own. Meanwhile, the Lucifer Hawk pursues Katsumi because of her ability to control the super-dimensional power. The women of AMP guard and protect Katsumi while they continue trying to persuade her to join them. A young woman called Yuki Saiko befriends Katsumi, but Katsumi eschews any emotional attachments. While trying to identify Yuki, Rally discovers that she was part of the secret IPER project exploring mind control. While walking with Yuki, Katsumi comes across her mother's family house, but when she goes inside, Katsumi encounters two Lucifer Hawk who attempt to take her to Nemesis. Kiddy, Nami and Yuki risk their lives to rescue her, and Katsumi realizes that she has a responsibility to the ones she cares for. Katsumi eventually uses her father's amulet to access her magical powers and destroys the remaining Lucifer Hawk. She then joins the AMP.

=== TV series ===
In 1998, a 26-episode animated TV series was produced by animation studio Radix. Hideki Tonokatsu served as director and Hiroyuki Kawasaki served as writer. American composer Jimmie Haskell produced the score for the series. A second season was planned, but it was canceled due to low ratings and sales of the first season.

No.	Title	Original release date
1	"Awake"; Transliteration: "Kakusei" (Japanese: 覚醒)	April 7, 1998
In the year 2023, Rally Cheyenne, head of the Attacked Mystification Police (AMP), invites Katsumi Liqueur to Tokyo on the pretext of giving her new information about the death of Katsumi's mother Fuyuka, but intends to enlist her in the AMP. Before landing, the airplane with Katsumi on board is attacked by a demon, a Lucifer Hawk. On landing the Lucifer Hawk attacks again but Katsumi destroys it with a magical blade given to her by her mother. Rally Cheyenne greets Katsumi and invites her to join the AMP.
2	"Decide"; Transliteration: "Ketsudan" (Japanese: 決断)	April 14, 1998
Katsumi initially rejects the offer of joining AMP but a Category 1 Lucifer Hawk breaks through the AMP amulet seals and offers information to Katsumi about her late father Gigelf. The AMP intercedes and the Lucifer Hawk retreats. Meanwhile, the police department have retrieved a piece of Lucifer Hawk which regenerates itself and opens a portal to Nemesis allowing a hoard of Lucifer Hawks to attack the city and begin devouring humans. Katsumi decides to join the AMP.
3	"Tokyo"; Transliteration: "Tōkyō no Soko" (Japanese: 東京の底)	April 21, 1998
Because of Katsumi's lack of police skills, Mobile Police member Robert (Roy) de Vice is allocated to give her a crash course in police work. He has just returned from arrest because of insubordination. However, they come under attack and crash land in Heaven's Hall in the lower depths of the city which is run by armed gangs called Ghouls. The meet Ms. Chrome, a friend of Robert's who helps them, but they are again caught by Ghouls. Fortunately, the AMP are able to trace Katsumi and rescues them both.
4	"Break-In"; Transliteration: "Bureiku-in" (Japanese: ブレイク•イン)	April 28, 1998
In the Marunouchi abandoned area, a Category 2 Lucifer Hawk appears and Katsumi attempts to defeat it alone. However, it escapes, infuriating the other team members and causing her to be reprimanded by Rally Cheyenne. Meanwhile, the AMP acquires a new Graviton weapon. While walking, Katsumi detects another Lucifer Hawk and gives chase, but when it sees her blade, it recognizes her as Katsumi Liqueur. It attacks her, but the AMP come to her rescue with the Graviton and new shield technology, immobilizing the Lucifer Hawk. Katsumi is finally able to destroy it and she is eventually accepted by the rest of the team.
5	"Let's Have A Party"; Transliteration: "Pāti no Yoru" (Japanese: パーティの夜)	May 5, 1998
There is friction between the AMP and other police departments over jurisdictional issues, so Yuki Saiko throws a party to help relieve the tension. After a shaky beginning, tensions ease, but police inspector Ralph Bowmers challenges Kiddy Phenyl to a street fight to resolve the turf war. Suddenly, the group are attacked by Lucifer Hawks because Rally removed the protective barrier in return for not being invited to the party. The ensuing fire-fight results in the AMP and police developing newfound respect for each other.
6	"Megadyne"; Transliteration: "Owari Naki Tatakai" (Japanese: 終わりなき戦い)	May 12, 1998
Despite their previous animosities, Ralph Bowmers and Kiddy Phenyl begin dating each other, but their relationship is like a contest. Ralph tells Kiddy that a Megadyne cyborg named Wire, has reappeared and Kiddy recalls three years earlier when Wire almost killed her and she was reconstructed as a cyborg. Later that night Kiddy confronts Wire seeking revenge and is almost killed, but is saved by Bowmers who risks his life to save her. Later in hospital, Kiddy finally acknowledges her emotional attachment to Bowmers.
7	"Kagome Kagome"; Transliteration: "Ushiro no Shōmen" (Japanese: うしろの正面)	May 19, 1998
Nami Yamigumo is taken home to an underground Shinto temple by her older sister Nana to meet her grandfather. There, the Yamigumo family guard five souls housed in five vessels: Dragon, Tiger, Phoenix, Turtle and Griffin. Nami's grandfather gives her the family's sacred sword and she undergoes a trial where she has to face her own doubts and fears to determine if she qualifies to be the Yamigumo heir. She passes the test, and returns to the AMP with her long hair cut short.
8	"Yes, My Master"; Transliteration: "Keishō" (Japanese: 継承)	May 26, 1998
The Category 1 Lucifer Hawk again tries to make Katsumi open a portal to Nemesis like her father, but she tries to defeat it and loses her dagger. The dagger then emits a powerful force which damages the Lucifer Hawk to but also injures Katsumi. The AMP set up a double magical barrier to conceal the unconscious Katsumi from the Lucifer Hawks, but it is ineffective and she leaves hospital under the control of the voice of Kenuo Grosspoliner. The AMP pursue Katsumi and the Lucifer Hawk in their aircraft the Simurgh while Katsumi reaches the entrapped sentient sword Grosspoliner which asks her to free and bond with it as did with her father Gigelf Liqueur. Shedding a drop of her blood she becomes the master of the sword, and destroys the Lucifer Hawk.
9	"Tokyo Antique"; Transliteration: "Katsute Ai Shita Machikado" (Japanese: かつて愛した街角)	June 2, 1998
Katsumi's apartment has been damaged by the recent battles with Lucifer Hawks so she tries to stay with different AMP members, but finds that they are better as friends than housemates. Rally authorizes Grosspoliner to reveal some of Katsumi's parents' history while they are visiting old Tokyo and Katsumi eventually decides to rent an apartment in the old quarter.
10	"XRP-77"; Transliteration: "Meikyū no Kioku" (Japanese: 迷宮の記憶)	June 9, 1998
Yuki Saiko hears a TV news report that two of her former childhood friends have been killed which awakens memories of her past. She and the others grew up in a cruel research facility run by Dr. Youichi Tajima to develop psychokinesis powers in children. Another friend, Annie, arrives injured on her doorstep. However, Annie is the one who killed Tajima and the other two women because they considered that Yuki was the best. Annie tries to kill Yuki using psychokinesis, but it backfires against Yuki's superior ability. After the event, Yuki wipes Annie's mind of her sad memories.
11	"Alice in Logic-Space"; Transliteration: "Kikai Shikake no Arisu" (Japanese: 機械仕掛けのアリス)	June 16, 1998
Tokyo awakes to find that the computer network has been hacked by someone using the image of a Cheshire Cat and the city grinds to a standstill. However six locations still operate normally, including AMP headquarters indicating a challenge to catch the hacker. The AMP team head to the six locations to investigate, using inline skates due to the lack of operational vehicles. Lebia Maverick sets out to catch the hacker, but one by one each of the AMP team are captured by the Cheshire Cat, in a series of Alice in Wonderland themed traps. Lebia Maverick finally admits defeat after she realizes that the hacker is her old friend Grover who created the situation on the anniversary of Lebia's grandfather, Stefan Maverick's birthday.
12	"Sister"; Transliteration: "Norowareta Kizuna" (Japanese: 呪われた絆)	June 23, 1998
Ganossa Maximilian and Rosa Cheyenne implement their plan to dominate the human world, and Lucifer Hawk activities increase, stretching both the AMP and police resources. Rally's sister Rosa appears in her office and challenges her to accept her Nemesis heritage. Rosa exclaims that she has come to kill Rally, but Rally manages to deflect her attacks and Rosa escapes. The members of AMP then confirm their support for Rally, but Kasumi cannot accept that Rally will fight her own family, and she leaves the AMP.
13	"Category 4"; Transliteration: "Daiyon no Yōma" (Japanese: 第四の妖魔)	June 30, 1998
Six months after Katsumi Liqueur left the AMP, she is living with Roy De Vice. The Metro Police Board publicly acknowledges the existence of the Lucifer Hawk extra terrestrials and the AMP who have been assigned to combat them. However, Roy is unaware that Nemesis blood runs in Katsumi's veins which designates her as a Category 4 Lucifer Hawk. One day, Katsumi uses her powers to rescue some vigilantes from a Lucifer Hawk, but they attack her instead. The Lucifer Hawk takes her to safety even though it is badly wounded and it then sacrifices itself to save her. The episode is in fact an illusion created by Ganossa Maximilian in an effort to convince Katsumi to join Nemesis, but she refuses and decides to stay with Roy. Rally Cheyenne then decides to reveal to Katsumi the truth about "Project Gaia" and her father Gigelf's role in it.
14	"Möbius Klein"; Transliteration: "Jokyoku" (Japanese: 序曲)	July 7, 1998
Rally Cheyenne tells Katsumi Liqueur what happened back in the days of the Silent Crisis and what Katsumi's father Gigelf tried to achieve with Project Gaia. The aim was to open a gateway between Earth and Nemesis to facilitate the removal of impure elements affecting both worlds and then close the gateway. However, during the complex interplay of the people involved pursuing their own hopes and dreams, Gigelf's former assistant Ganossa Maximilian interfered in order to further his own ambitions.
15	"Lum Cheng"; Transliteration: "Kaorun no Shōjo" (Japanese: 九竜の少女)	July 14, 1998
Chief Mana Isozaki seeks help from the old Magician's Guild member, Avalanche Wong in Neo Hong Kong, who sends his granddaughter Lum Cheng, an elemental mage, to join the AMP as their sixth team member. However, Lum Cheng has her own way of doing things and Katsumi offers to mentor her after remembering her own problems when she was a new recruit. The situation becomes complicated when Lum Cheng develops a crush on Roy De Vice. Meanwhile, the human ghouls have joined forces with the Lucifer Hawks to further their own interests, but end up being exploited and consumed.
16	"Labyrinth"; Transliteration: "Koku no Meikyū" (Japanese: 刻の迷宮)	July 21, 1998
Yuki visits an antique shop to buy a coffee grinder, but the owner is a Lucifer Hawk, and during their battle, Yuki and the Lucifer Hawk are hurled 30 years into the past of pre-apocalyptic Tokyo! She is taken in by a young man, Toru Washio and teaches him how to make real coffee and they eventually fall in love. The Lucifer Hawk attacks the pair, and Yuki unconsciously generates a force field which destroys the Lucifer Hawk, sending her back to the future. Back in the present, the middle-aged manager of her shop drops by and delivers her coffee grinder, and she realizes that he is Toru Washio.
17	"Destiny"; Transliteration: "Musubiau Yūbe" (Japanese: 結びあう夕べ)	July 28, 1998
Kiddy Phenyl is charged with murder based on circumstantial evidence and is arrested while chasing a megadyne who is the real culprit. Ralph Bowmers is confident that she is innocent and undertakes an investigation of his own. Kiddy escapes and the police are ordered to shoot her on sight. The megadyne named Spider breaks into police headquarters and destroys their research lab. Meanwhile, the AMP discover that a megadyne-controlling K-Worm has been injected into Kiddy. Spider tracks Kiddy to Ralph's apartment where he forces her to attack Ralph. Kiddy breaks free of the K-Worm's control and kills Spider, but not before he shoots Ralph. A Lucifer Hawk emerges from Spider's body, but Lum Cheng destroys it before it can escape and Kiddy utilizes her life-support system to save Ralph. The government then stops Nagata Heavy Industries from further development of megadynes and issues a warrant for the arrest of the CEO Shinjiro Nagata who was duped by Ganossa Maximilian.
18	"DOMULL"; Transliteration: "Wakare Yuku Yoru" (Japanese: 別れゆく夜)	August 4, 1998
The Mobile Police Division investigates an incident involving a mass murder with only one survivor, a young girl. Roy De Vice and Ralph Bowmers discover their superiors are involved, distributing a drug called Domull which turns humans into monsters in an attempt to combat the Lucifer Hawk. The Mobile Police Division attack the Yokoyama Chemicals facility which they suspect is the source of the drug, and the AMP join them in the assault. When they enter, Roy discovers that a captured Lucifer Hawk was being used as the source of the drug. The young girl was used as a vehicle to release it and Roy reluctantly kills her. The AMP is then assigned to take over the investigation. Katsumi breaks up with Roy because of her key role in the conflict between humans and Nemesis and to protect him from herself.
19	"Back of a Coin"; Transliteration: "Sasurai no Hate" (Japanese: さすらいの果て)	August 11, 1998
Lum Cheng takes Katsumi on a wild drive to the remote seaside to cheer her up, but when they arrive, they find the rest of the AMP already there. Later, Roy proposes to Katsumi, but before she can reply, Maximilian Ganossa reminds her of her heritage and she leaves without answering Roy. Ganossa then sends the Lucifer Hawk, Damia-Rounasm Varast, to kill Roy who offers to fight to the death to save Katsumi. Ganossa accepts the deal, but it is no contest, and Damia prepares to kill Roy.
20	"LOVE"; Transliteration: "Ai" (Japanese: 愛)	August 18, 1998
The AMP saves Roy from the Lucifer Hawk Damia and certain death, meanwhile Rosa attacks Rally back at AMP headquarters. Ganossa releases Katsumi to join Roy, but Damia goes in pursuit. Ganossa intercedes and abducts Katsumi and Roy and puts their love for each other to the test. Roy overcomes Ganossa's barrier to reach Katsumi and when Damia appears, their joint energy, powered by their love, proves enough to destroy Damia. However, later Ganossa ambushes and kills Roy in their apartment in an effort to fuel Katsumi's hate and rage to awaken the Lucifer Hawk within her. In the year 2029, following Roy's death, Katsumi destroys the building and disappears.
21	"Dark Side of the Moon"; Transliteration: "Tsuki no Umareta Yoru" (Japanese: 月の生まれた夜)	August 25, 1998
In the six months following the death of Roy De Vice, there have been no serious Lucifer Hawk incidents and the funding for the AMP is downgraded. The members are reassigned to other units so Kiddy organizes a reunion party at Yuria's café. Katsumi suddenly reappears and everyone is pleased to see her, however, based on comments by Mana, Kiddy is uncertain if Katsumi can be trusted. When Yuki is attacked during a lunar eclipse, Kidddy suspects Katsumi, but the attacker was a small Lucifer Hawk. Later, Katsumi and Lebia's vehicle crashes and Lebia is seriously injured.
22	"CRYING"; Transliteration: "Anten" (Japanese: 暗転)	September 1, 1998
Rally is suspicious of Lebia's accident as she is the most skilful operator of the police electronic systems. Rally arranges for Mana to increase security protection around the Avalanche files which contain data on Project Gaia which Ganossa and Nemesis need to reopen the gateway between the two worlds. Rally is also concerned because Ganossa and Rosa possess the demon sword Medium, which they may be using to control Katsumi. Meanwhile, the authorities prepare to dismantle the AMP and Katsumi agrees with the decision. That night while on duty, Katsumi is commanded by Ganossa to retrieve the data from Avalanche and she attacks Mana and injures in the process. Mana manages to warn the others that Kastumi is now an enemy, but it is too late. Katsumi is now controlled by the powerful weapon called Medium, and she strikes them down. Ganossa now prepares to use the data to create a new Gaia Project.
23	"Life Again"; Transliteration: "Saisen Seshimono" (Japanese: 再生せしもの)	September 8, 1998
With Katsumi revealed as a traitor and the AMP about to be disbanded, morale is low within the team. Yuki cannot believe what has happened and is unable to control her abilities. Meanwhile, Ralph tells Kiddy that 200 megadynes are unaccounted for and they are loose in the city. Mana advises the team that AMP is still operational sends Lebia, Lum and Kiddy to investigate the unusual activity at the huge Cyclotron located below the city. They find megadynes trying to revive the facility protected by Lucifer Hawks. In a financial coup, Rally takes over the police administration and reinstates the AMP. Ganossa then arrives to offer Rally a deal.
24	"HELL ROAD"; Transliteration: "Jigoku e no Michi" (Japanese: 地獄への途)	September 15, 1998
Ganossa invites Rally to meet him alone at Tokyo Stadium and she agrees, despite suspecting it is a trap. When Rally arrives, she is caught in a spell by Nami Yamaigumo who is under Ganossa's control and he orders Rosa Cheyenne to kill her sister Rally. Meanwhile, the ESPer Yuki is driven to hysteria by her visions about different possible futures. Lucifer Hawk attack AMP headquarters, take control of the master computer and begin to merge with the building itself. Rosa attempts to kill Rally but fails and she realizes that the sisters share a powerful bond, however Ganossa takes the opportunity to strike them both down.
25	"Count Down"; Transliteration: "Shitō" (Japanese: 死闘)	September 22, 1998
Katsumi, now possessed by Medium, prepares to take control of AMP and attacks her former team members, Kiddy and Lum. Mana decides to employ the satellite-controlled F-Mission self-destruct program in hopes of destroying the building and Hawks en masse. The building, and later Tokyo as a whole, is ordered to be evacuated. The AMP members are torn between obeying orders to flee and attempting to rescue their comrades. Meanwhile, Yuki and Toru are hit by an unknown blast, and as Toru lies dying, he reveals that in order to see Yuki again, he helped Nemesis which caused her inability to utilize her powers. Mana, Nami, Kiddy, Lum and Yuki desperately try to rescue Katsumi from the control of the demon sword Medium just as the satellite fires a destructive beam at the building.
26	"TOMORROW"; Transliteration: "Kibō" (Japanese: 希望)	September 29, 1998
One week after the destruction of the AMP building, the Tokyo Administration publicly announces the existence of Lucifer Hawks and the work of the AMP. Meanwhile, the AMP members are hospitalized and Kiddy is in a coma after most of her body was destroyed. The Tokyo Administration then requires the evacuation of the entire Tokyo area in preparation for possible future Lucifer Hawk attacks. Kiddy recovers with the help of Ralph, and Avalanche Wong seals away the demon sword Medium. Katsumi returns and reunites with Grosspoliner, and she discovers that she is pregnant with Roy's child. Later, Rally declares to the displaced population that the AMP will continue onward to victory over the Hawks.

=== Stage plays ===
Kia Asamiya announced that on Saturday, December 17, 2016, the stage play adaptation of Silent Möbius has been greenlit. The main staff and the main casts were revealed following December 23, as well as the run date from March 29 to April 2, 2017. The cast includes Karen Iwata, Saori Yasaka, Mutsuki Arisawa, Saki Suzuki, Rin Asuka, Mayu Sekiya, Emi Ōtori and Saki Funaoka.

== Works cited ==
- Shinbo, Akiyuki (2012). 新房語 [Shinbogatari] (in Japanese). Ichijinsha. ISBN 978-4758012591.
