= Weiming Subdistrict =

Coordinates: 38.04155°N 114.46576°E

Weiming Subdistrict 维明街道
- Subdistrict

Chinese transcription(s)
- Interactive map of Weiming Subdistrict
- Country: China
- Province: Hebei
- Prefecture: Shijiazhuang
- District: Qiaoxi District
- Time zone: UTC+8 (China Standard Time)

Weiming Subdistrict (Chinese: 维明街道) is a township-level division of Qiaoxi District, Shijiazhuang, Hebei, China.

== See also ==
- List of township-level divisions of Hebei
