= Changjiang Subdistrict, Shijiazhuang =

Changjiang Subdistrict 长江街道
- Subdistrict
- Location in Hebei
- Coordinates: 38°02′43″N 114°36′30″E
- Country: People's Republic of China
- Province: Hebei
- Prefecture-level city: Shijiazhuang
- District: Yuhua
- Village-level divisions: 1 residential community 4 villages
- Elevation: 69 m (226 ft)
- Time zone: UTC+8 (China Standard)
- Postal code: 050035
- Area code: 0311

Changjiang Subdistrict (simplified Chinese: 长江街道; traditional Chinese: 長江街道; pinyin: Chángjiāng Jiēdào) is a subdistrict of Yuhua District, Shijiazhuang, Hebei, People's Republic of China, located just within the 2nd Ring Road in the northern part of the city. As of 2011, it has 1 residential community (社区) and 4 villages under its administration.

== See also ==
- List of township-level divisions of Hebei
