= Yuxing Subdistrict =

Coordinates: 38°00′52″N 114°32′56″E

Yuxing Subdistrict 裕兴街道
- Subdistrict

Chinese transcription(s)
- Interactive map of Yuxing Subdistrict
- Country: China
- Province: Hebei
- Prefecture: Shijiazhuang
- District: Yuhua District
- Time zone: UTC+8 (China Standard Time)

Yuxing Subdistrict (Chinese: 裕兴街道) is a township-level division of Yuhua District, Shijiazhuang, Hebei, China.

== See also ==
- List of township-level divisions of Hebei
