= Zhentou Subdistrict =

Coordinates: 38°01′17″N 114°26′02″E

Zhentou Subdistrict 振头街道
- Subdistrict

Chinese transcription(s)
- Interactive map of Zhentou Subdistrict
- Country: China
- Province: Hebei
- Prefecture: Shijiazhuang
- District: Qiaoxi District
- Time zone: UTC+8 (China Standard Time)

Zhentou
- Simplified Chinese: 振头
- Postal: Chentow
Transcriptions
Standard Mandarin
- Hanyu Pinyin: Zhèntóu
- Wade–Giles: Chen^{4}-t'ou^{2}

Zhentou Subdistrict (Chinese: 振头街道) is a township-level division of Qiaoxi District, Shijiazhuang, Hebei, China.

== See also ==
- List of township-level divisions of Hebei
