= Shijiazhuang Art Museum =

Art museum in Shijiazhuang, China

- 石家庄市美术馆
- Established: December 18, 2010; 15 years ago
- Location: 1 Yuandong Street, Yuxi Park, Qiaoxi District, Shijiazhuang, Hebei Province, China
- Type: Art museum

The Shijiazhuang Art Museum (Chinese: 石家庄市美术馆) is an art museum in Shijiazhuang, Hebei, China.

The museum opened on 18 December 2010. It is located in Yuxi Park, covering an area of about 1.67 hectares. The museum has a total building area of nearly 12,000 square meters. The main exhibition area is in a two-story building.

The museum is located in the Taihe River Urban Zone. To the north is the confluence of the Hutuo River and Taihe River. To the east is the Wohu Mountain and to the northeast is the historic Zhengding City. It includes facilities for exhibition displays, a library, conferences, shopping, teaching, and research.

In 2020–21, the museum collaborated with the CAFA Art Museum on an exhibition entitled "The Logic of Painting". During 2024–25, the museum has collaborated on an exhibition with artists associated with the Pifo Gallery, including Gillian Ayres, Enrico Bach, John McLean, Kang Haitao, Li Jikai, Ma Ke, Ni Jun, Tong Kunniao, Wu Jian'an, and Yin Zhaoyang. In 2025, the traditional Chinese artist Liu Liyong and his students exhibited paintings at the museum.

== See also ==
- List of museums in China
