= Huaidi Subdistrict =

Huaidi Subdistrict 槐底街道
- Subdistrict
- Location in Hebei
- Coordinates: 38°01′41″N 114°31′55″E
- Country: People's Republic of China
- Province: Hebei
- Prefecture-level city: Shijiazhuang
- District: Yuhua
- Village-level divisions: 12 residential communities
- Elevation: 75 m (246 ft)
- Time zone: UTC+8 (China Standard)
- Postal code: 050022
- Area code: 0311

Huaidi Subdistrict (Chinese: 槐底街道; pinyin: Huáidǐ Jiēdào) is a subdistrict of Yuhua District, Shijiazhuang, Hebei, People's Republic of China. As of 2011, it has 12 residential communities (居委会) under its administration.

== See also ==
- List of township-level divisions of Hebei
