= Taihang Subdistrict, Shijiazhuang =

Taihang Subdistrict 太行街道
- Subdistrict

Chinese transcription(s)
- Interactive map of Taihang Subdistrict
- Coordinates: 35°15′23″N 113°15′2″E
- Country: China
- Province: Hebei
- Prefecture: Shijiazhuang
- District: Yuhua District
- Time zone: UTC+8 (China Standard Time)

Taihang Subdistrict (Chinese: 太行街道) is a township-level division of Yuhua District, Shijiazhuang, Hebei, China.

== See also ==
- List of township-level divisions of Hebei
