= Batman: Child of Dreams =

Japanese manga series

- North American cover
- Genre: Superhero
- Manga
- Written by: Kia Asamiya
- Published by: Kodansha
- English publisher: NA: DC Comics
- Magazine: Magazine Z
- Original run: November 22, 2000 – November 22, 2001
- Volumes: 2

Batman: Child of Dreams is a manga series written and illustrated by Kia Asamiya, published in Kodansha's Magazine Z. The series follows Batman as he travels to Tokyo on the trail of a lethal drug that allows the person who ingests it to shapeshift into anyone they desire.

Child of Dreams was collected in two volumes, released in November 2000 and November 2001 by Kodansha. The English-language version was released in hardcover and softcover editions in 2003 by DC Comics. Because of the way that manga is published in Japan, reading from right to left, which is now commonplace in modern translated manga releases, Child of Dreams was "flipped", which might have gone unnoticed had it not made Two-Face scarred on the right side of his body.

== Plot ==
The story features Batman in Gotham City and Tokyo, locating the source of a deadly drug. This drug provides the users with the thrill of literally living the life of their dreams for a day, by forcing the user to shapeshift into the person they desire to be. After the day expires, the drug kills the user by draining them of their lifeforce. Most of the users in Gotham turned into literal copies of several Batman villains. Batman suspected they were not the real thing after they seemed to sport twisted forms of their regular traits. Realizing a larger force is at work, Batman, with the help of Japanese journalist Yuko Yagi, follows the trail of the chemical to Tokyo, where he finds the deranged criminal mastermind behind the creation of the infamous drug is none other than a heavily mutated fan.

== Publication ==
Child of Dreams was serialized in Kodansha's Magazine Z. The chapters were later collected in two volumes:

- ISBN 978-4-06-334361-8. Released in November 2000.
- ISBN 978-4-06-334474-5. Released in November 2001.

The English-language translation was handled by Max Allan Collins. The hardcover edition (ISBN 1-56389-906-X) was released on March 1, 2003, while the softcover edition (ISBN 1-56389-907-8) was released on December 1 the same year.

== See also ==
- Batman: Death Mask, the next manga outing for Batman, by Yoshinori Natsume
