= Jiantong Subdistrict =

Jiantong Subdistrict 建通街道
- Subdistrict
- Location in Hebei
- Coordinates: 38°00′38″N 114°30′10″E
- Country: People's Republic of China
- Province: Hebei
- Prefecture-level city: Shijiazhuang
- District: Yuhua
- Village-level divisions: 6 residential communities
- Elevation: 73 m (240 ft)
- Time zone: UTC+8 (China Standard)
- Area code: 0311

Jiantong Subdistrict (Chinese: 建通街道; pinyin: Jiàntōng Jiēdào) is a subdistrict of Yuhua District, Shijiazhuang, Hebei, People's Republic of China. As of 2011, it has six residential communities (居委会) under its administration.

== See also ==
- List of township-level divisions of Hebei
