= Dongli Subdistrict =

Dongli Subdistrict 东里街道
- Subdistrict
- Location in Hebei
- Coordinates: 38°01′43″N 114°27′51″E
- Country: People's Republic of China
- Province: Hebei
- Prefecture-level city: Shijiazhuang
- District: Qiaoxi
- Village-level divisions: 7 residential communities
- Elevation: 78 m (256 ft)
- Time zone: UTC+8 (China Standard)
- Postal code: 050081
- Area code: 0311

Dongli Subdistrict (simplified Chinese: 东焦街道; traditional Chinese: 東里街道; pinyin: Dōnglǐ Jiēdào) is a subdistrict and the seat of Qiaoxi District, in the heart of Shijiazhuang, Hebei, People's Republic of China. As of 2011, it has 7 residential communities (社区) under its administration.

== See also ==
- List of township-level divisions of Hebei
