= Yudong Subdistrict, Shijiazhuang =

Coordinates: 38°01′15″N 114°34′17″E

Yudong Subdistrict 裕东街道
- Subdistrict

Chinese transcription(s)
- Interactive map of Yudong Subdistrict
- Country: China
- Province: Hebei
- Prefecture: Shijiazhuang
- District: Yuhua District
- Time zone: UTC+8 (China Standard Time)

Yudong Subdistrict (Chinese: 裕东街道) is a township-level division of Yuhua District, Shijiazhuang, Hebei, China.

== See also ==
- List of township-level divisions of Hebei
