= Dongyuan Subdistrict, Shijiazhuang =

Dongyuan Subdistrict 东苑街道
- Subdistrict
- Location in Hebei
- Coordinates: 38°01′47″N 114°31′54″E
- Country: People's Republic of China
- Province: Hebei
- Prefecture-level city: Shijiazhuang
- District: Yuhua
- Village-level divisions: 14 residential communities
- Elevation: 76 m (249 ft)
- Time zone: UTC+8 (China Standard)
- Postal code: 050022
- Area code: 0311

Dongyuan Subdistrict (simplified Chinese: 东苑街道; traditional Chinese: 東苑街道; pinyin: Dōngyuàn Jiēdào) is a subdistrict of Yuhua District, Shijiazhuang, Hebei, People's Republic of China. As of 2011, it has 14 residential communities (居委会) under its administration.

== See also ==
- List of township-level divisions of Hebei
