= Youyi (name) =

Youyi is the Mandarin Pinyin spelling of a Chinese unisex given name. The same name is also spelled You-yih in Mandarin Wade-Giles (used in Taiwan) and Yu-ih in Cantonese pronunciation.

People with this name include:

- Youyi (actress), Singaporean actress (born 1980)
- Fu Youyi (629–691), chancellor of the Chinese Tang dynasty and Wu Zetian's Zhou dynasty
- Hou Yu-ih (born 1957), Taiwanese politician
- Zhang Youyi (1900–1988), Chinese educator, banker, and the first wife of the Chinese poet Xu Zhimo

== See also ==
- Chinese given name
- Yui (name)
