= Yuqiang Subdistrict, Harbin =

Yuqiang Subdistrict 裕强街道
- Subdistrict
- Location in Heilongjiang
- Coordinates: 45°53′4″N 126°34′17″E
- Country: People's Republic of China
- Province: Heilongjiang
- Prefecture-level city: Harbin
- District: Hulan District
- Time zone: UTC+8 (China Standard)

Yuqiang Subdistrict (simplified Chinese: 裕强街道; traditional Chinese: 裕強街道; pinyin: Yùqiáng Jiēdào) is a subdistrict in Hulan District, Harbin, Heilongjiang, China. As of 2023, it administers two villages — Yuqiang Village, Limin Village (利民村) — and the following six residential communities:

- Chenneng Community (辰能社区)
- Linda Community (林达社区)
- Meilan Community (美兰社区)
- Jinyuan Community (锦源社区)
- Jiangting Community (江霆社区)
- Huayao Community (华耀社区)

== See also ==
- List of township-level divisions of Heilongjiang
