= Youyi Subdistrict, Shijiazhuang =

Coordinates: 38.0294°N 114.4489°E

Youyi Subdistrict 友谊街道
- Subdistrict

Chinese transcription(s)
- Interactive map of Youyi Subdistrict
- Country: China
- Province: Hebei
- Prefecture: Shijiazhuang
- District: Qiaoxi District
- Time zone: UTC+8 (China Standard Time)

Youyi Subdistrict (Chinese: 友谊街道) is a township-level division of Qiaoxi District, Shijiazhuang, Hebei, China.

== See also ==
- List of township-level divisions of Hebei
