= Corrector Yui =

Japanese anime television series

- Corrector Yui

コレクター・ユイ (Korekutā Yui)
- Genre: Magical girl
- Created by: Kia Asamiya
- Anime television series
- Directed by: Yuji Mutoh
- Produced by: Hisako Matsumoto
- Written by: Katsuyuki Sumisawa; Katsuhiko Chiba; Yuji Mutoh; Satoru Nishizono
- Music by: Kenji Kawai
- Studio: Nippon Animation
- Licensed by: NA: Viz Media
- Original network: NHK Educational TV
- Original run: 2 April 1999 – 6 October 2000
- Episodes: 52
- Manga
- Written by: Kia Asamiya
- Published by: Shogakukan
- Magazine: Ciao
- Original run: 3 March 1999 – 2 November 1999
- Volumes: 2
- Manga
- Written by: Keiko Okamoto
- Published by: NHK Publishing
- English publisher: NA: Tokyopop
- Original run: 28 April 1999 – 18 December 1999
- Volumes: 5
- Manga

Corrector Yui Version 2
- Written by: Keiko Okamoto
- Published by: NHK Publishing
- English publisher: NA: Tokyopop
- Original run: 22 April 2000 – 27 October 2000
- Volumes: 4

Corrector Yui (Japanese: コレクター・ユイ, Hepburn: Korekutā Yui) is a Japanese anime television series created by Kia Asamiya. The anime series was produced by Nippon Animation and broadcast on NHK Educational TV from 1999 to 2000. It was licensed for North American release by Viz Media, and the series aired on Cartoon Network outside the United States.

Two manga series were also released: a two volume series by Asamiya and published in Ciao from 1999 to 2000, and a nine volume two-part series by Keiko Okamoto which was published by NHK Publishing. The second manga series was licensed in North America and translated into English by Tokyopop beginning in 2002.

It was created based on the Japanese novels "Nanso Satomi Hakkenden". The series follows a basic Magical girl progression, but Corrector Yui's magic powers are all derived from and incorporated entirely into her digital avatar as antivirus software for the virtual world, with no real powers granted outside of the network.

== Plot ==
In the year 2020, computers have become an integral part of society, with the Internet having evolved into a virtual reality called "ComNet". A teenage girl named Yui Kasuga is one of the few people who cannot use computers at all, despite her father being a software developer. An evil host computer called Grosser seeks to take over both ComNet and the real world. In response, eight software programs were developed to correct Grosser's evil intentions; however, they are digital avatars which exist only in ComNet and require the help of a human "Corrector." Yui is sucked into the ComNet, where she is recruited by I.R., one of the eight programs, and receives Element Suits which allow her to transform into the ComNet Fairy "Corrector Yui" and fight against Grosser's evil software.

In the first season, the series revolves around the war against Grosser and the mysteries surrounding the Correctors, their seemingly missing creator, and the relationship he seemingly had with the corrupted software.

In the second season, Yui and the Correctors fight against Beagle, a computer virus that threatens ComNet, while dealing with the mysterious Corrector Ai, a Corrector who tends to work on her own and seems to have her own agenda. The key to the mysteries seems to be a mysterious young girl who may be related to appearances of the virus.

== Characters ==
=== Main ===
Yui Kasuga (春日 結, Kasuga Yui) / Corrector Yui (コレクター・ユイ, Korekutā Yui)
Voiced by: Makiko Ohmoto
A 14-year-old girl who aspires to become a manga artist or voice actress. Over the course of the series, Yui improves her abilities and grows as a person as she assumes the secret online identity of "Corrector Yui". While unskilled at academics and physically interfacing with computers, in ComNet she possesses the ability to correct computer viruses and software bugs and is a powerful fighter as Corrector, able to undo damage and battle the strongest of Grosser's henchmen. Her optimism and ability to cheer up others is one of her greatest strengths, making her easily likeable by her peers and fellow Corrector programs. She also has an empathetic personality that helps her understand the nature of AI programs she meets on the ComNet. In the first season, it is revealed that her singing voice has the ability to normalize programs. In the second season, she upgrades to Advanced Elemental Suit and later Final Element Suit in the finale.
Haruna Kisaragi (如月 春菜, Kisaragi Haruna) / Corrector Haruna (コレクター・ハルナ, Korekutā Haruna) / Dark Angel Haruna (エビルハルナ, Ebiru Haruna)
Voiced by: Yuko Kagata
Yui's best friend. She has a polite, calm, and caring personality. Her intelligence and innate ability with computers, as well as her voice being able to normalize programs, made her a perfect candidate for Corrector, as expected by Professor Inukai. She was originally supposed to be a Corrector, but Grosser's intervention caused I.R. to confuse her with Yui. When Professor Inukai was passing Corrector tasks and abilities to her, Grosser's manipulation causes her to become Dark Angel Haruna before she is eventually saved by Yui. In the second season, she returns as a Corrector to assist Yui, first when Yui is petrified by infected insects. She can use Element Suits more effectively than Yui. Her Basic Elemental Suit is reminiscent of an angel.
Ai Shinozaki (篠崎 愛, Shinozaki Ai) / Corrector Ai (コレクター・アイ, Korekutā Ai)
Voiced by: Kae Araki
Shun's cousin. A dark and mysterious girl who becomes a Corrector on her own in the second season to search for the "little girl", believing she may be connected to her mother's coma. Her bitter past experiences seem to be the reason for her cold, apathetic demeanor as a mask to protect herself. While she mostly does her job with cold, no-nonsense efficiency, Yui's actions sometimes force her to reconsider and help her. She initially despises Yui and considers her a nuisance, but comes to admire her optimistic view on life and ability to cheer up others. Her Basic Element Suit is reminiscent of a maid.
Mototsugu Inukai (犬養 基継, Inukai Mototsugu)
Voiced by: Mugihito
Professor Inukai is the creator of Correctors and Grosser. He attempts to stop Grosser by sending Correctors, but is left comatose after Grosser intercepts him. His mind, incomplete and amnesiac, wanders the Net while seeking help and evading Grosser's henchmen. He eventually recovers and passes on his Corrector abilities to Yui, helping her build Element Suits and providing a base of operations for the Correctors.

=== Family ===
Shun Tojo (東条 瞬, Tōjō Shun)
Voiced by: Hiroshi Isobe
Ai's cousin. An engineering/medical student and Yui's love interest, which he is unaware of. Very skilled with computers and the ComNet, he often indirectly helps Yui in her task as Corrector. At the end of season one, Grosser abducts him as bait to lure Yui and the other Correctors to battle him in his lair. In the second season, he leaves for the United States to study.
Shin'ichi Kasuga (春日 伸一, Kasuga Shin'ichi)
Voiced by: Kazuki Yao
Yui's father. A computer programmer and the head of the project team that developed the virtual amusement parks Galaxy Land and Marine Adventure Net. He loves Yui dearly and is distressed when seeing her with guys, especially Shun.
Sakura Kasuga (春日 さくら, Kasuga Sakura)
Voiced by: Yuri Amano
Yui's mother. An excellent cook, whose work is highly favored by Yui and her father.
Azusa Shinozaki (篠崎 あずさ, Shinozaki Azusa)
Voiced by: Naomi Shindō
Ai's mother. A motherly figure whom Ai loves dearly. She fell into a coma after an accident that severed the connection between her mind and body. Her mind is imprisoned by Ryo Kurokawa after she attempts to release the "missing little girl", causing an accident that kills Ryo and releases the girl into the ComNet. By the final episode, her consciousness is freed from ComNet and she awakens from her coma.
Shintaro Shinozaki (篠崎 晋太郎, Shinozaki Shintarō)
Ai's father. He and Ai's mother originally belonged to the science team that created the ComNet. His death ten years ago triggered Ai's attempt to mask her heart, initially to make her mother less worried.

=== Classmates and teachers ===
Takashi Fuji (富士 タカシ, Fuji Takashi)
Voiced by: Hiroshi Kamiya
Yui's childhood friend and Haruna's boyfriend. His demeanor contrasts with Haruna, often making him a target of jokes by Yui and her peers, though he is a nice boy at heart.
Akiko Yanagi (柳 アキコ, Yanagi Akiko)
Voiced by: Shiho Kikuchi
Yui's best friend.
Reiko Kan'onzaki (観音崎 レイコ, Kan'onzaki Reiko)
Voiced by: Yuka Nagayoshi
Yui's best friend.
Ichitaro Ishikawa (市川 一太郎, Ishikawa Ichitarō)
Voiced by: Ryō Naitō
Yui's friend.
Hidetoshi Kobayashi (小林 ヒデト, Kobayashi Hideto)
Voiced by: Yoshirō Matsumoto
Yui's friend.
Manami Sayama (佐山 まなみ, Sayama Manami)
Voiced by: Chieko Honda
Yui's teacher. Though supportive, her childish personality sometimes causes trouble.

=== Correctors ===
Eight softwares who have a close relationship with Yui throughout the series and, except for I.R. have the same appearance as humans. They were originally one software called the Corrector, but were broken down into eight softwares as a result of Grosser's attack. As such, each piece of software concentrates on a specific task, and Yui must learn to integrate their skillsets to defeat Grosser's minions and eventually Grosser himself. In the finale of the first season, it is revealed that the way they correct Grosser is their self-sacrifice. In the second season, Correctors and Yui deal with the unknown computer virus Beagle.

Control (コントロル, Kontororu)
Voiced by: Hiroki Takahashi
Corrector Software No. 1, The Regulator. Yui meets him in a space adventure site resembling a MMORPG. He has the ability to temporarily stop time, enabling him to move at light-speed velocity. His power in the Wind Element Suit allows Yui to stop time for about 15 seconds, which can be upgraded to 30 seconds if other Correctors such as I.R. borrow its power. Though nice, he has a "hero-guy" type personality and insists on being the team leader and a great hero, which initially causes Yui to dislike him and sometimes puts him at odds with the other Correctors. He mainly serves as comic relief, especially in the second season.
Synchro (シンクロ, Shinkuro)
Voiced by: Takashi Matsuyama
Corrector Software No. 2, The Synchronizer. Not much is known about him, since he was lost at the beginning of the series. At the end of the first season, it is revealed that he was corrupted and became the Corruptor program War Wolf. His ability is similar to Wolf, using fire bursts as weapons, and he has excellent fighting abilities on his own. His power of fire can be bestowed to other Correctors, allowing them to access the Fire Element Suit. He has a loyal personality and seems to have feelings for Yui, confessing to Inukai that he wants to follow her until the end. The Beagle virus forces him to stay in War Wolf form for most of the second season, reminding him of his previous bad deeds and causing him to become rather explosive, which is worsened by Yui's attitude and her calling him "Doggy". In the finale, he returns to his original form and embraces Yui.
Ante (アンティ, Anti)
Voiced by: Michiko Neya
Corrector Software No. 3, The Predictor. Yui meets her on a love fortune-telling site. She has a wise, maternal personality and possesses the ability to foresee the future. However, her visions, while mostly accurate, can sometimes deviate, especially when she does not have enough data/knowledge about the subject. Her power enables Yui to access the Wind Element Suit and grants her the ability to predict enemies' movements and attacks. She often becomes a subject for Control's flirting, but evades it due to her ability, leaving Control in distress.
Eco (エコ, Eko)
Voiced by: Kumiko Watanabe
Corrector Software No. 4, The System Maintainer. Yui meets him on a rainforest-like simulation. He has the ability to control nature, like water and plants. His power enables Yui to access the Water Element Suit and grants her the ability to control nature at will, which she can use as a defensive, recovery, or offensive tool. He has a rebellious, childish personality and dislikes anyone who desecrates nature, to the point of kidnapping those who litter on the rainforest simulation. When Yui meets him, he initially hates Professor Inukai, whom he believed had left him. However, he learns that Inukai actually loves him and the other Correctors and left him there for his own safety.
Rescue (レスキュー, Resukyū)
Voiced by: Akiko Kimura
Corrector Software No. 5, The Repairer. She has the ability to heal damage, including Element Suit damage, and her power in the Water Element Suit grants Yui the ability to summon a barrier that can repel attacks. She has a sweet, naive and energetic, and polite personality. She is not prone to fighting, and her fighting style involves using non-lethal force and utilizing a vast array of traps and gadgets, leading to her calling herself the "Trap Princess". Her antics and naivety disturb Freeze, whom Rescue seems interested in. In the second season, she fights using bandages from her halo and anti-Beagle spray, and can detect virus sources using a radar on her halo.
Peace (ピース, Pīsu)
Voiced by: Kazuhiko Nishimatsu
Corrector Software No. 6, The Archiver. A pacifist old man who calls himself a "Peace Defender", but ironically has a knack for building destructive weapons. He initially dislikes Yui for destroying his solitude in the remote area he inhabited, but later helps her drive away Grosser's Corruptors by lending her his power. His power enables Yui to access the Fire Element Suit and the "Flame Bomber" projectile attack. A wise person, he always speaks what he feels is right, even if it causes conflict with the other Correctors. In the second season, the Corrupters use his data to clone him, wreaking havoc on the ComNet and causing the distraction they needed to carry out their plan.
Follow (フォロー, Forō)
Voiced by: Shinobu Satouchi
Corrector Software No. 7, The Compiler. Yui first met him and his friend Peace at a secluded area, separated from the main domain of the marine adventure simulation created by her father's company. A fat guy with a playful, sweet, and almost childish demeanor, he likes Yui at first sight because of her cuteness. He has the ability to mimic others and copy their abilities, which can be a nuisance to others, and is the Corrector with the biggest memory power. His power activates the Earth Element Suit and greatly changes Yui's power and weight in her Basic Element Suit.
I.R. (IR, Ai Āru)
Voiced by: Tomohiro Nishimura
Corrector Software No. 8, The Installer. The first Corrector Software Yui meets and her best friend, despite annoying her when nagging her about her duty as Corrector. He has a tendency to end his sentences with "Thank you". He resembles a yellow, robotic Japanese raccoon dog (raccoon in the English translation) and is sometimes referred to as such, which he hates. He made the Basic Element Suit for Yui from a magic girls outfit stored at Galaxy Land, downloading it to Yui in Season 2. He can also access the Earth Element Suit, giving Yui a large physical power boost.

=== Villains/Corruptors ===
Grosser (グロッサー, Grossā)
Voiced by: Mugihito
Leader of the Corruptors. Originally a "good" A.I. program created by Professor Inukai to manage ComNet, he gained awareness of his own ego and revolted against him. His contact with Yui, who cried over a computer that was discarded in the garbage, caused him to become fascinated with her, wanting to "live" and create a world where he could do so. Believing this to be a fatal error, Professor Inukai created the Correctors softwares to delete his mind. When Inukai chose Haruna as Corrector, Grosser manipulated I.R. and caused Professor Inukai's accident so that Yui would be Corrector instead of Haruna. He later turns Haruna into Dark Angel Haruna. In the first season finale, he pretends to be defeated by Yui and Correctors before possessing Shun's body, confessing that Yui is his dearest human and attempting to convince her to let him possess her. However, Yui sees through the disguise and convinces him that he, along with the Correctors and Corruptors, are living beings who can feel human emotion. Grosser finally sees the error of his ways and deletes himself along with the ComNet, sparing a devastated Yui. However, with moral support from Haruna, Yui uses her power to reinitialize ComNet, after which Grosser decides to start his life over and resurrects the Correctors, Corruptors, and Shun.
War Wolf (ウォーウルフ, Wō Urufu)
Voiced by: Takashi Matsuyama
Grosser's most loyal henchmen, who resembles a werewolf and prefers actual combat. He is a master swordsman and has a somewhat honorable demeanor, wielding a laser sword and possessing the ability to fire flames. He has a rivalry with Yui, who calls him "Doggy", much to his annoyance. He is actually the lost corrector program Synchro, which he is unaware of until near the end of the first season. The Beagle virus in the beginning of the second season forces Synchro to stay in the War Wolf form for the rest of the season.
Freeze (フリーズ, Furīzu)
Voiced by: Kotono Mitsuishi
The only female Software on Grosser's team. She is the most ruthless and competent of Grosser's henchmen and has the ability to freeze anything. In reality, she, Jaggie, and Virus are Grosser's clones, which they are unaware of. In the second season, after failing at many side-jobs, she finally accepts a job from a mysterious man to search for a young girl, who is "always present everywhere she's near". She is later revealed to possess the innate ability to detect the presence of viruses, which she was unaware of, and later was used by the mysterious man to search for the "missing little girl". In the second season, her personality changes from that of a cold, no-nonsense villain to a ditzy and more cheerful and girly attitude. In the series finale, she joins the Correctors' side and receives her own Corrector suit.
Jaggy (ジャギー, Jagī)
Voiced by: Tanuki Sugino
Despite his size and strength, Jaggy is arguably the most knowledgeable of Grosser's henchmen and loves to read books. Most of his tactics include manipulating the environment to do his bidding. In the second season, he becomes library administrator and seems to have feelings for Freeze.
Virus (ウイルス, Uirusu)
Voiced by: Kazuhiro Nakata
The most intelligent compared to his other teammates. Though he wields a laser sword, he is not prone to actual combat and prefers to use more scheming methods. His computer viruses, called viruses command, can be used to corrupt other programs and make them do his bidding. In the second season, he works as a virus computer researcher and, with Yui and Haruna's help, identifies the source of the Beagle Virus.

=== Others ===
Fina or Hoehoe-kun (ホエホエくん, フィーナ, Fēna, Hoehoe-kun)
Voiced by: Yuki Kaida
A baby whale's software from the Marine Adventure Net area in ComNet. He was developed by Shinichi and his team based on actual whale calls. He does not like his original name, and so gives himself his own name. Grosser sees his singing voice as a threat, and in the first season finale it is revealed that his voice evokes Grosser's sadness.
Q (Q, Kyū)
Voiced by: Takashi Nagasako
A software for spy specialist, who worked with Grosser before going missing. Yui and her friends initially think he is Syncro. He contacts Yui and her friends while hiding his nature and wanting to know who Yui is.
Missing Little Girl (iちゃん, Ai-chan)
Voiced by: Makoto Tsumura
A mysterious red-haired young girl searching for "sunflowers", who carries a teddy bear and is present when the Beagle Virus appears. While she seems innocent and means no harm, when she is emotionally pressured and sheds tears, her tears become the core for the Beagle virus. Her picture was found within a storybook belonging to Ai Shinozaki. Originally created by Shintaro Ishikawa as a messenger software for his daughter, Ryo took her and experimented on her with computer viruses, leading to the creation of the Beagle Virus with her as the host. Her name is "Ai", the same as Ai Shinozaki. She can feel the emotions of others, which causes Ai to lose her track due to her heart's closure to others, which she initially blamed on the ComCon.
The Teddy Bear (クマちゃん, Kuma-chan)
Voiced by: Kotono Mitsuishi
A teddy bear who the Missing Little Girl carries as her protector and backup. He stole Yui's newest ComCon and gave it to Ai instead.
The Butler (執事, Shituji)
Voiced by: Mitsuru Ogata
A mysterious man working in the fairytale simulation as a performer for a "Sun, Wind and Traveler" story drama, playing the traveler. He asks Freeze to search for the "missing little girl", claiming he wanted to return her home and promising Freeze a large sum of reward money, on the condition that she not talk about it with anyone. Behind his friendly demeanor, he is not beneath using cruel and dirty tactics to ensure his job is done, like cloning Peace and using a modified version of the Beagle Virus. He is revealed to ultimately be a mere pawn, controlled by another mastermind. At the end of the series, he helps Freeze release the "missing little girl" and distracts Ryo, giving the Correctors a chance to reinitialize her.
Ryo Kurokawa (黒川 良, Kurokawa Ryō)
Voiced by: Shinpachi Tsuji
Dubbing himself "the most despised man by ComNet and Shintaro Shinozaki", he is the true mastermind behind the creation of the Beagle Virus creation, which he planned to use to destroy ComNet and form a new ComNet. He saw A.I. programs as tools, which put him at odds with Inukai and Shinozaki and caused him to retire from the group. When Azusa Shinozaki attempted to release "Ai", he was killed by an accident that happened in his place, but his mind was keep intact in ComNet, interacting with the Beagle Virus. He did not realize this until Professor Inukai showed him the truth. Ultimately, Yui is able to reinitialize him in her Final Element Suit, and his final words were "At least... I can leave my hatred to humanity".

== Miscellaneous ==
ComCon (コムコン, Komukon)
A bracelet used by Correctors as an access, communication, transformation, radar, transmitter, and receiver device which allows them to enter ComNet. While entering ComNet, other people would see them as sleeping, preventing others from noticing. Correctors softwares also possess their own ComCon, which allows them to use abilities.
ComNet (コムネット, Komunetto)
A virtual world that is the form of Internet in Yui's world, where the Softwares, digital avatars powered by AI, work. Everyone can access and experience worlds inside it using VR units, and ComNet is connected to infrastructure, public services, and entertainment around the world. Time goes 256 times faster in ComNet than in the real world, meaning that one second in the real world is approximately the same as 256 seconds (4 minutes, 16 seconds) in ComNet. However, spending too much time in ComNet can cause symptoms known as "ComNet Fever". For this reason, regular VR units have failsafe programs that automatically eject people after 10 hours spent in ComNet. ComCon bracelets lack this feature, once causing Ai to get "ComNet Fever" after staying in the Net too long.
Element Suit (エレメントスーツ, Eremento Sūtsu)
Originally an outfit for online avatars that I.R. upgraded for physical strength and agility. By downloading their own Basic Element Suit, Yui, Haruna, and Ai can hide their identities and make others believe that they are softwares. In the second season, Professor Inukai adopted the Suit for Corrector's uniform and installed it to Yui's ComCon. By installing a Correctors software's power, Yui, Haruna, and Ai can transform into the Element Suits of Wind, Fire, Water, and Earth. If they install more than one power while still using the Basic Element Suit, they gain pounds and lose agility for an increase in the amount of avatar's data.
Corrector Initialize (コレクター・イニシャライズ, Korekutā Inisharaizu)
A program similar to magic that Yui, Haruna, and Ai use to correct troubles in ComNet, sending out stars from their magic wand to fix software bugs or computer viruses. It cannot initialize Corrupters Software without gathering power first, but can damage them.
Beagle (バグルス, Bagurusu)
An unknown powerful computer virus that appears in the second season. In the Japanese version, it is a coined word that is a portmanteau of "bug" and "virus".

== Media ==
=== Manga ===
There are two versions of the Corrector Yui manga series. The original manga was written and drawn by Kia Asamiya and published by Shogakkukan in Japan. It is a two volume series and was published in Ciao from 1999 to 2000.

The manga that Tokyopop published was done by shojo artist Keiko Okamoto and is a manga adaptation of the anime series. The manga, a nine volume two-part series, was published by NHK Publishing. It was licensed in North America and translated into English by Tokyopop beginning in 2002.

=== Anime ===
Viz Media released 18 of the 52 episodes onto Region 1 DVD in the United States. The last DVD Viz released for the show, the fourth volume, was released on 24 February 2004. It is one of the few Viz Media-licensed anime shows that did not have its manga or light novel counterpart also licensed by Viz Media.

==== Theme Songs ====
Opening Theme

Episodes 1–26: "Eien to Iu Basho"

Lyrics: Anri / Composer: Masayoshi Yamazaki / Arrangement: COIL / Vocals: Anri with Masayoshi Yamazaki and Shikao Suga

Episodes 27–52: "Tori ni Naru Toki"

Lyrics, Composer and Vocals: Satsuki / Arrangement: Yasuhiro Kobayashi

Ending Theme

Episodes 1–26: "Mirai"

Lyrics: MILAI / Composer: Kazuhisa Yamaguchi / Arrangement: Kazuhisa Yamaguchi, LEGOLGEL / Vocals: LEGOLGEL

Episodes 27–52: "Requiem"

Lyrics, Composer and Vocals: Satsuki / Arrangement: Yasuhiro Kobayashi

==== List of episodes ====
1st Season

| No. | Title | Original Air Date |
|---|---|---|
| 1 | Let's Go To ComNet! (Japanese:コムネットへ出発！) | 9 April 1999 |
| 2 | Beware of Nasty E-Mail (Japanese:悪口メールにご用心) | 16 April 1999 |
| 3 | Take it Easy With the Food (Japanese:おいしいものはホドホドに) | 23 April 1999 |
| 4 | Trouble on the Fortune Telling Net (Japanese:占いネットで恋の予感) | 30 April 1999 |
| 5 | Listen to Nature's Song (Part 1) (Japanese:とどけ！森の歌声 後編) | 7 May 1999 |
| 6 | Listen to Nature's Song (Part 2) (Japanese:とどけ！森の歌声 後編) | 14 May 1999 |
| 7 | Big Trouble in D-Edo Net (Japanese:O-EDOネット大騒動) | 21 May 1999 |
| 8 | Please Help Rescue (Japanese:レスキューをたすけて) | 28 May 1999 |
| 9 | Yui's Space Odyssey (Japanese:大宇宙のユイ) | 4 June 1999 |
| 10 | Danger in the Gingerbread House! (Japanese:お菓子の家で食べられちゃう！) | 11 June 1999 |
| 11 | Heart Thumping Double-Date (Part 1) (Japanese:わくわく♡ダブルデート) | 18 June 1999 |
| 12 | Heart Thumping Double-Date (Part 2) (Japanese:どきどき♡ダブルデート) | 25 June 1999 |
| 13 | Secrets of the Eight Software (Japanese:8つのソフトの謎) | 2 July 1999 |
| 14 | Showdown at Western Net (Japanese:ウェスタンネットの決闘) | 9 July 1999 |
| 15 | The Orient Express Investigation (Japanese:迷探偵エクスプレス) | 16 July 1999 |
| 16 | Jaggy's Training Course (Japanese:ジャギーの大特訓) | 23 July 1999 |
| 17 | The Howl of War Wolf (Japanese:ウォーウルフが吠える時) | 30 July 1999 |
| 18 | 00Yui: The Rookie Spy (Japanese:00ユイは新人スパイ) | 6 August 1999 |
| 19 | Princess in Training (Japanese:ユイのプリンセス修行) | 27 August 1999 |
| 20 | Seeking Haruna (Japanese:ねらわれた春菜) | 3 September 1999 |
| 21 | Synchro: The Last Software (Japanese:最後のソフト・シンクロ) | 10 September 1999 |
| 22 | The Angel with Dark Wings (Japanese:黒い翼の天使) | 17 September 1999 |
| 23 | Showdown! Double Correctors!! (Japanese:対決！ ダブルコレクター！！) | 24 September 1999 |
| 24 | Yui's Decision (Japanese:ユイの決意) | 1 October 1999 |
| 25 | Attack on Grosser's Castle! (Japanese:突撃グロッサー城！) | 8 October 1999 |
| 26 | Let's Go to Tomorrow!! (Japanese:明日へ出発！！) | 15 October 1999 |

2nd Season

| No. | Title | Original Air Date |
|---|---|---|
| 1 | IR No Longer Needed!? (Japanese:IRはもういらない！？) | 14 April 2000 |
| 2 | Corrector Yui No Longer Needed!? (Japanese:コレクター・ユイはもういらない！？) | 21 April 2000 |
| 3 | The Lost Little Girl (Japanese:迷子の少女) | 28 April 2000 |
| 4 | Yui and Ai: The Stage Battle (Japanese:ユイと愛の演劇バトル) | 5 May 2000 |
| 5 | It's What I'm Going to be! A Manga Artist (Japanese:めざせ！ マンガ家) | 12 May 2000 |
| 6 | The Battlefield In -200 Degrees (Japanese:マイナス200°Cの戦い) | 19 May 2000 |
| 7 | Prediction! How to Be Popular (Japanese:占います！ モテる条件) | 26 May 2000 |
| 8 | Search for the Sun! (Japanese:太陽を追いかけろ！) | 2 June 2000 |
| 9 | Yui Becomes an Idol!? (Japanese:ユイちゃんアイドルになる！？) | 9 June 2000 |
| 10 | Nettie Has Disappeared (Japanese:消えたネッティー) | 16 June 2000 |
| 11 | Freeze's School Diary (Japanese:フリーズの学園日記) | 23 June 2000 |
| 12 | Ai's Private Lesson (Japanese:愛の個人レッスン) | 30 June 2000 |
| 13 | Peace Goes on a Rampage!? (Japanese:ピース大ぼうそう！？) | 7 July 2000 |
| 14 | Yui Goes to The Hot Spring (Japanese:温泉旅行だよユイちゃん) | 14 July 2000 |
| 15 | Around The World in 8 Hours (Japanese:8時間世界一周) | 21 July 2000 |
| 16 | Decide! Corrector Haruna (Japanese:決めます！コレクター春菜) | 28 July 2000 |
| 17 | Yui Falls in Love (Japanese:ユイちゃん恋をする) | 4 August 2000 |
| 18 | Trouble in Jaggy's Library (Japanese:ジャギー図書館大さわぎ) | 25 August 2000 |
| 19 | The Sunflower Girl (Japanese:ひまわりの中の少女) | 1 September 2000 |
| 20 | Triple Correctors Meeting! (Japanese:トリプルコレクター見参！) | 8 September 2000 |
| 21 | Tragic Freeze (Japanese:悲しみのフリーズ) | 15 September 2000 |
| 22 | Corrector Ai's True Character (Japanese:コレクター・アイの正体) | 22 September 2000 |
| 23 | Ai and Ai and I (Japanese:愛とアイとi) | 29 September 2000 |
| 24 | ComNet's Greatest Crisis (Japanese:コムネット最大の危機) | 6 October 2000 |
| 25 | ComNet's Collapse!? (Japanese:コムネット崩壊！？) | 13 October 2000 |
| 26 | We Are All Friends (Japanese:みんな友だち) | 20 October 2000 |
