= Fangcun, Hebei =

Fangcun 方村镇
- Town
- Location in Hebei
- Coordinates: 37°58′48″N 114°32′57″E
- Country: People's Republic of China
- Province: Hebei
- Prefecture-level city: Shijiazhuang
- District: Yuhua
- Village-level divisions: 2 residential communities 6 villages
- Elevation: 67 m (220 ft)
- Time zone: UTC+8 (China Standard)
- Area code: 0311

Fangcun (Chinese: 方村; pinyin: Fāngcūn) is a town of Yuhua District, in the southeastern suburbs of Shijiazhuang, Hebei, People's Republic of China, located along China National Highway 308. As of 2011, it has 2 residential communities (居委会) and 6 villages under its administration.

== See also ==
- List of township-level divisions of Hebei
