= Yuqiang Subdistrict, Shijiazhuang =

Yuqiang Subdistrict 裕强街道
- Subdistrict

Chinese transcription(s)
- Location in Hebei
- Coordinates: 38°00′46″N 114°33′12″E
- Country: China
- Province: Hebei
- Prefecture: Shijiazhuang
- District: Yuhua District
- Time zone: UTC+8 (China Standard Time)

Yuqiang Subdistrict (Chinese: 裕强街道) is a township-level division of Yuhua District, Shijiazhuang, Hebei, China. As of 2023, it administers the following thirteen residential communities:

- Zhuodahuayuan Community (卓达花园社区)
- Shenxingxiaoqu Community (神兴小区社区)
- Songcun Community (宋村社区)
- Weitong Community (位同社区)
- Sanjiaotang Community (三教堂社区)
- Xintiandi Community (新天地社区)
- Yaqing Community (雅清社区)
- Guodaquancheng Community (国大全城社区)
- Anyuan Community (安苑社区)
- Dongfanglüzhou Community (东方绿洲社区)
- Zhongmeilüdu Community (众美绿都社区)
- Anheyuan Community (安和苑社区)
- Guoshishan Community (国仕山社区)

== See also ==
- List of township-level divisions of Hebei
