= Qiaoxi, Shijiazhuang =

Qiaoxi 桥西区
- District
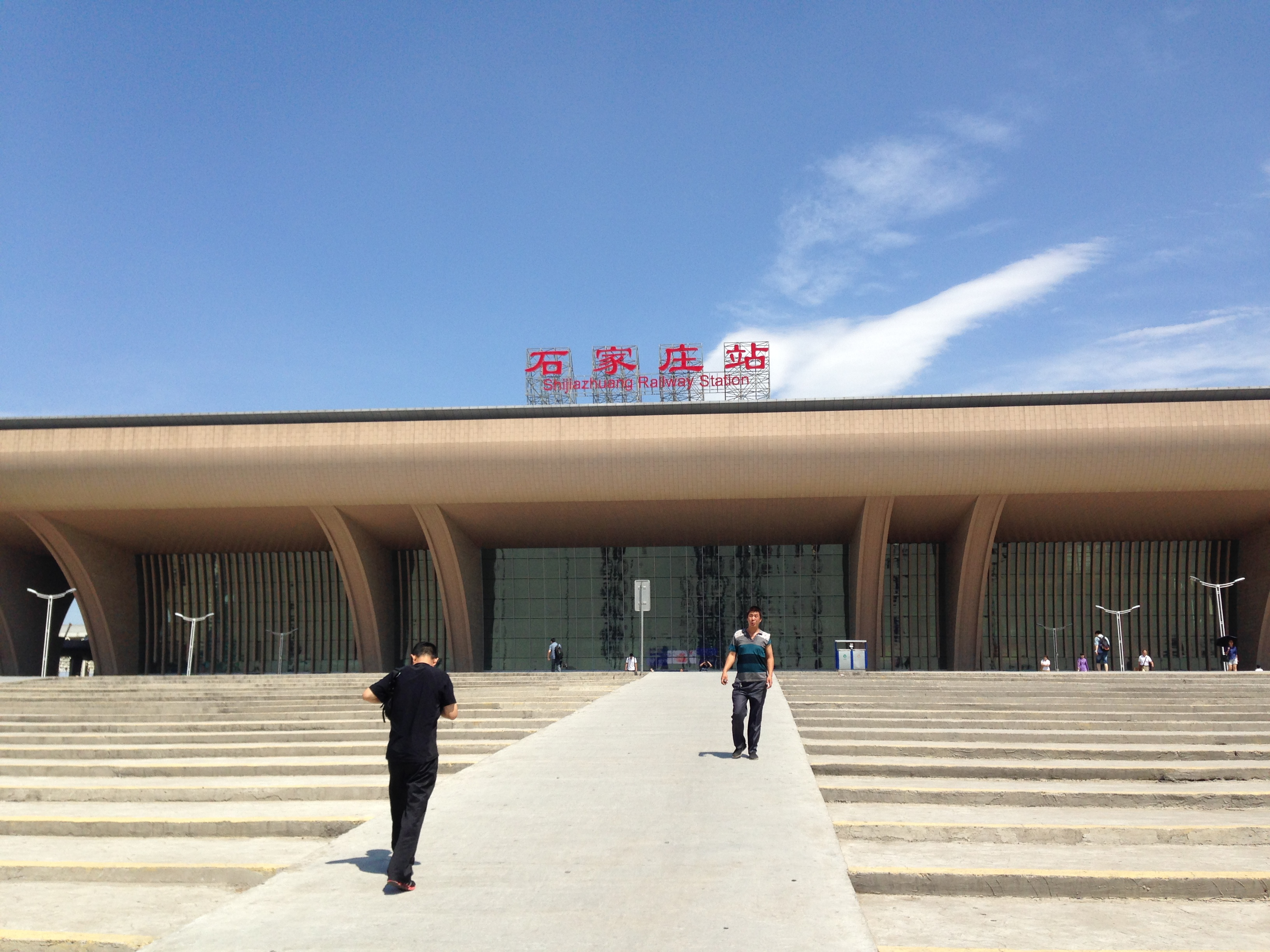
- Shijiazhuang railway station

- Location in Hebei/Shijiazhuang Qiaoxi (Shijiazhuang)
- Coordinates: 38°00′14″N 114°27′40″E
- Country: People's Republic of China
- Province: Hebei
- Prefecture-level city: Shijiazhuang

Area
  - Total: 67.26 km^{2} (25.97 sq mi)

Population (2020 census)
  - Total: 979,646
  - Density: 14,570/km^{2} (37,720/sq mi)
- Time zone: UTC+8 (China Standard)

Qiaoxi District (simplified Chinese: 桥西区; traditional Chinese: 橋西區; pinyin: Qiáoxi Qū; lit. 'West of the Bridge') is one of eight districts of the prefecture-level city of Shijiazhuang, the capital of Hebei Province, North China, located in the southwest of the urban core of the city. It had 979,646 inhabitants in 2020.

== Administrative divisions ==
List of subdistricts:

- Dongli Subdistrict (东里街道), Zhongshan Road Subdistrict (中山路街道), Nanchang Subdistrict (南长街道), Weiming Subdistrict (维明街道), Yuxi Subdistrict (裕西街道), Youyi Subdistrict (友谊街道), Hongqi Subdistrict (红旗街道), Xinshi Subdistrict (新石街道), Yuandong Subdistrict (苑东街道), Xili Subdistrict (西里街道), Zhentou Subdistrict (振头街道)

The only township is Liuying Township (留营乡).

== See also ==
- Shijiazhuang Art Museum, located in Qiaoxi
