= Yuhua, Shijiazhuang =

Yuhua 裕华区
- District
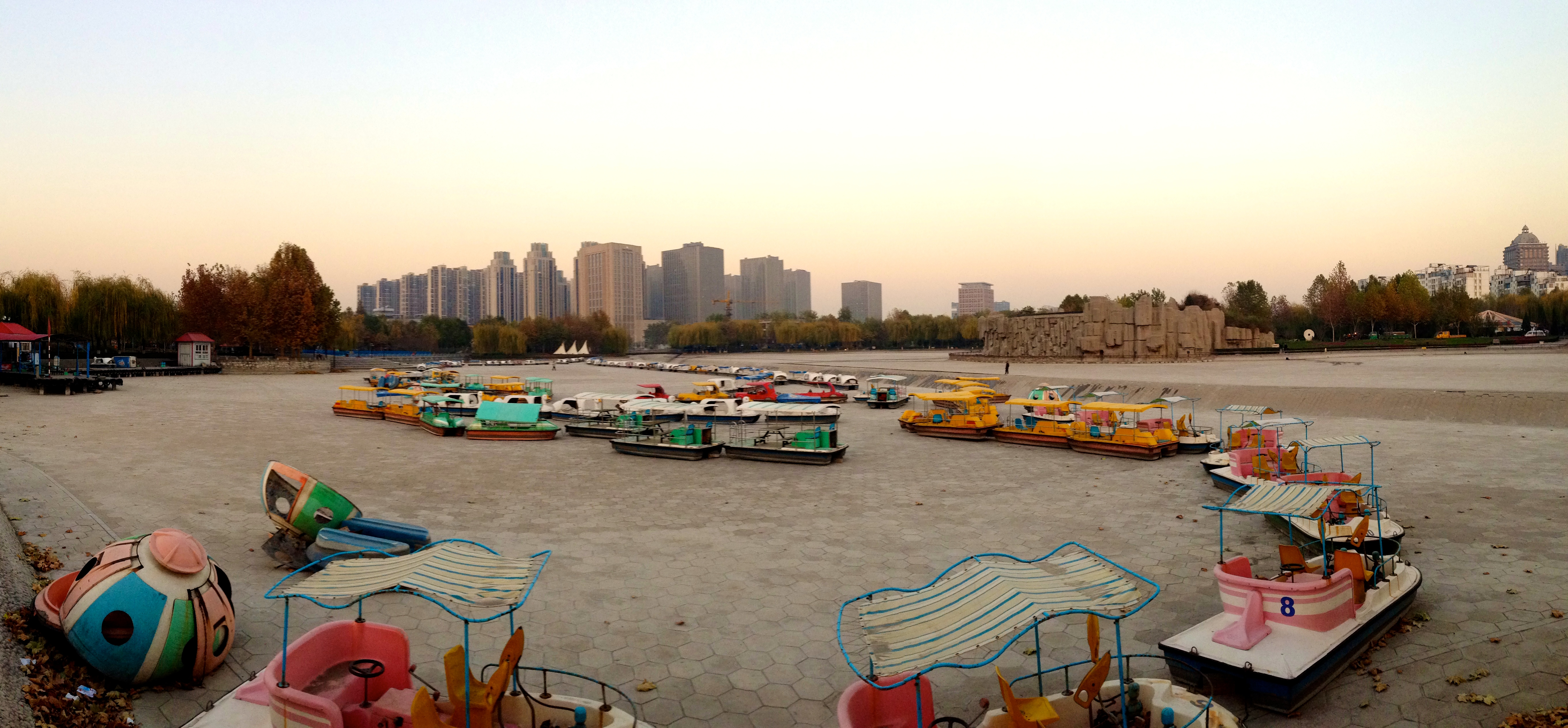
- Century Park

- Location in Hebei/Shijiazhuang Yuhua (Shijiazhuang)
- Coordinates: 38°00′23″N 114°31′53″E
- Country: People's Republic of China
- Province: Hebei
- Prefecture-level city: Shijiazhuang
- District seat: Yuxing Subdistrict
- Elevation: 67 m (220 ft)
- Time zone: UTC+8 (China Standard)

Yuhua District (simplified Chinese: 裕华区; traditional Chinese: 裕華區; pinyin: Yùhuá Qū; lit. 'Wealthy and Prosperous') is one of eight districts of the prefecture-level city of Shijiazhuang, the capital of Hebei Province, North China, located in the southeast of the urban core of Shijiazhuang. It lies towards the southeastern part of the greater urban area. Several major universities of Shijiazhuang, including Hebei Normal University, Hebei University of Science and Technology, Hebei Medical University, Shijiazhuang Economy Institute, Hebei Professional Art Institute, Shijiazhuang Foreign Language School, are locating in this area. The government of Shijiazhuang and its major affiliates are also located in this region.

The northern part of Yuhua District is Zhongshan Road, one of the major commercial regions in Shijiazhuang.

The highest building in the city, Shijiazhuang TV Tower, is located in this district.

== Administrative divisions ==
There are 9 subdistricts and 2 towns.

Subdistricts

- Yuxing Subdistrict (裕兴街道)
- Yuqiang Subdistrict (裕强街道)
- Dongyuan Subdistrict (东苑街道)
- Jiantong Subdistrict (建通街道)
- Huaidi Subdistrict (槐底街道)
- Yuhua Road Subdistrict (裕华路街道)
- Yudong Subdistrict (裕东街道)
- Changjiang Subdistrict (长江街道)
- Taihang Subdistrict (太行街道)

Towns

- Songying (宋营镇)
- Fangcun (方村镇)
