= Shangzhuang =

Shàngzhuāng may refer to the following locations in China:

Towns

- Shangzhuang, Beijing (上庄镇), in Haidian District, Beijing
- Shangzhuang, Shijiazhuang (上庄镇), in Luquan District, Shijiazhuang, Hebei

Townships

- Shangzhuang Township, Laiyuan County (上庄乡), Hebei
- Shangzhuang Township, Ruzhou (尚庄乡), Henan
- Shangzhuang Township, Xinye County (上庄乡), Henan
