= Huolu railway station =

Railway station in Shijiazhuang, Hebei, China

The Huolu railway station is a railway station on the Shijiazhuang–Taiyuan high-speed railway, in Huolu, Luquan District, Shijiazhuang, Hebei, People's Republic of China.
