= Weishui =

Weishui may refer to the following locations in China:

- Weishui, Hebei (微水镇), town in Jingxing County
- Weishui, Hubei (洈水镇), town in Songzi
- Wei River, known in history as Weishui (渭水; "Wei Water")
- Wei River (Xiang River) (沩水河), a tributary of the Xiang River
