= Cangyanshan =

Cangyanshan 苍岩山镇
- Town
- Location in Hebei
- Coordinates: 37°50′40″N 114°08′02″E
- Country: People's Republic of China
- Province: Hebei
- Prefecture-level city: Shijiazhuang
- County: Jingxing
- Village-level divisions: 19 villages
- Elevation: 422 m (1,385 ft)
- Time zone: UTC+8 (China Standard)
- Area code: 0311

Cangyanshan (simplified Chinese: 苍岩山; traditional Chinese: 蒼岩山; pinyin: Cāngyánshān), named after Mount Cangyan which rises to its south, is a town of Jingxing County in the Taihang Mountains of southwestern Hebei province, China, located 21 kilometres (13 mi) south of the county seat. As of 2011, it has 19 villages under its administration.

== See also ==
- List of township-level divisions of Hebei
