= Beizheng Township, Jingxing County =

Beizheng Township 北正乡
- Township
- Location in Hebei
- Coordinates: 38°03′38″N 114°04′48″E
- Country: People's Republic of China
- Province: Hebei
- Prefecture-level city: Shijiazhuang
- County: Jingxing
- Village-level divisions: 8 villages
- Elevation: 284 m (932 ft)
- Time zone: UTC+8 (China Standard)
- Area code: 0311

Beizheng (Chinese: 北正; pinyin: Běizhèng) is a township of Jingxing County, Hebei, China, located adjacent to the Jingxing Mining District. As of 2011, it had 8 villages under its administration.

== See also ==
- List of township-level divisions of Hebei
