= Shangan =

Shangan may refer to:

- Shengan, a village in Lorestan Province, Iran
- Shang'an, a township in China
