= Wujiayao Township =

Coordinates: 37°57′42″N 114°15′32″E

Wujiayao Township 吴家窑乡
- Township

Chinese transcription(s)
- Interactive map of Wujiayao Township
- Country: China
- Province: Hebei
- Prefecture: Shijiazhuang
- County: Jingxing County
- Time zone: UTC+8 (China Standard Time)

Wujiayao Township (Chinese: 吴家窑乡) is a township-level division of Jingxing County, Shijiazhuang, Hebei, China.

== See also ==
- List of township-level divisions of Hebei
