= Weizhou, Hebei =

Coordinates: 38.10899°N 114.14908°E

Weizhou, Jingxing County 威州镇
- Town

Chinese transcription(s)
- Interactive map of Weizhou, Jingxing County
- Country: China
- Province: Hebei
- Prefecture: Shijiazhuang
- County: Jingxing County
- Time zone: UTC+8 (China Standard Time)

Weizhou, Jingxing County (Chinese: 威州镇) is a township-level division of Jingxing County, Shijiazhuang, Hebei, China.

== See also ==
- List of township-level divisions of Hebei
