= Nanwangzhuang Township =

Coordinates: 37°55′54″N 114°09′42″E

Nanwangzhuang Township 南王庄乡
- Township

Chinese transcription(s)
- Interactive map of Nanwangzhuang Township
- Country: China
- Province: Hebei
- Prefecture: Shijiazhuang
- County: Jingxing County
- Time zone: UTC+8 (China Standard Time)

Nanwangzhuang Township (Chinese: 南王庄乡) is a township-level division of Jingxing County, Shijiazhuang, Hebei, China.

== See also ==
- List of township-level divisions of Hebei
