= Licun =

Licun could refer to the following locations in China:

- Licun Township (利村乡), Yudu County, Jiangxi
- Licun Subdistrict (里村街道), Zhushan District, Jingdezhen, Jiangxi

Towns

- Licun, Guangxi (黎村镇), in Rong County
- Licun, Fengcheng, Jiangxi (丽村镇)
- Licun, Shanxi (里村镇), in Quwo County

Written as "李村镇":

- Licun, Shijiazhuang, in Luquan, Hebei
- Licun, Xingtai, in Qiaoxi District, Xingtai, Hebei
- Licun, Henan, in Luolong District, Luoyang
- Licun, Shandong, in Mudan District, Heze
- Licun, Qingdao (李村街道)
