= Cao Fang (disambiguation) =

Cao Fang may refer to:

- Cao Fang, formally known as Duke Li of Shaoling, the third emperor of the state of Cao Wei
- Cao Fang (singer), a Chinese indie pop singer-songwriter

== See also ==
- Caofang (disambiguation)
