= Nanzhangcheng =

Coordinates: 37.91077°N 114.07486°E

Nanzhangcheng 南障城镇
- Town

Chinese transcription(s)
- Interactive map of Nanzhangcheng
- Country: China
- Province: Hebei
- Prefecture: Shijiazhuang
- County: Jingxing County
- Time zone: UTC+8 (China Standard Time)

Nanzhangcheng (Chinese: 南障城镇) is a township-level division of Jingxing County, Shijiazhuang, Hebei, China.

== See also ==
- List of township-level divisions of Hebei
