= Dahe, Shijiazhuang =

Dahe 大河镇
- Town
- Location in Hebei
- Coordinates: 38°08′04″N 114°23′26″E
- Country: People's Republic of China
- Province: Hebei
- Prefecture-level city: Shijiazhuang
- District: Luquan
- Village-level divisions: 26 villages
- Elevation: 95 m (312 ft)
- Time zone: UTC+8 (China Standard)
- Area code: 0311

Dahe (Chinese: 大河; pinyin: Dàhé; lit. 'great river') is a town under the administration of Luquan District of Shijiazhuang in southwestern Hebei province, China, located in the northwestern suburbs of Shijiazhuang and just east of G5 Beijing–Kunming Expressway. As of 2011, it has 26 villages under its administration.

== See also ==
- List of township-level divisions of Hebei
