= Baodu Zhai =

Ancient fortified settlement in Shijiazhuang, Hebei, China

Coordinates: 38°05′18″N 114°16′37″E

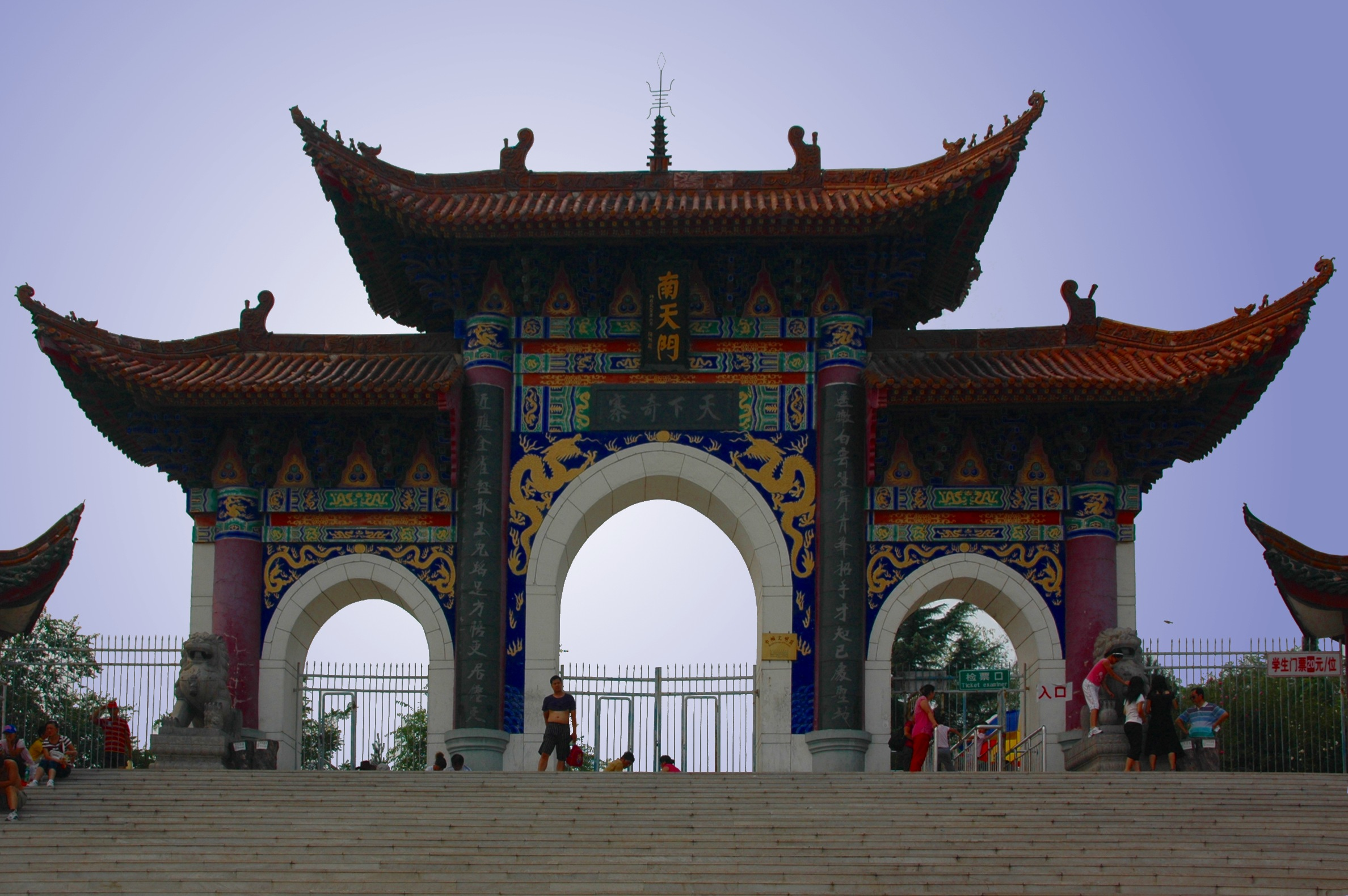
Nantianmen (南天门), the main entrance of the settlement.

Baodu Zhai (simplified Chinese: 抱犊寨; traditional Chinese: 抱犢寨; pinyin: Bàodúzhài), or Baodu Village, is an ancient fortified hilltop settlement located in the outlying Luquan District about 16 km (9.9 mi) from central Shijiazhuang, Hebei, China. It is located on top of Baodu Mountain, which is said to resemble a reclining Buddha.

According to legend, the Han dynasty commander Han Xin ambushed 2000 soldiers at the site, and in the Wei dynasty, an uprising by Ge Rong forced local villagers to flee to the mountain carrying their calves, hence the name "Baodu" ("bao" means "to carry" and "du" means "calf").

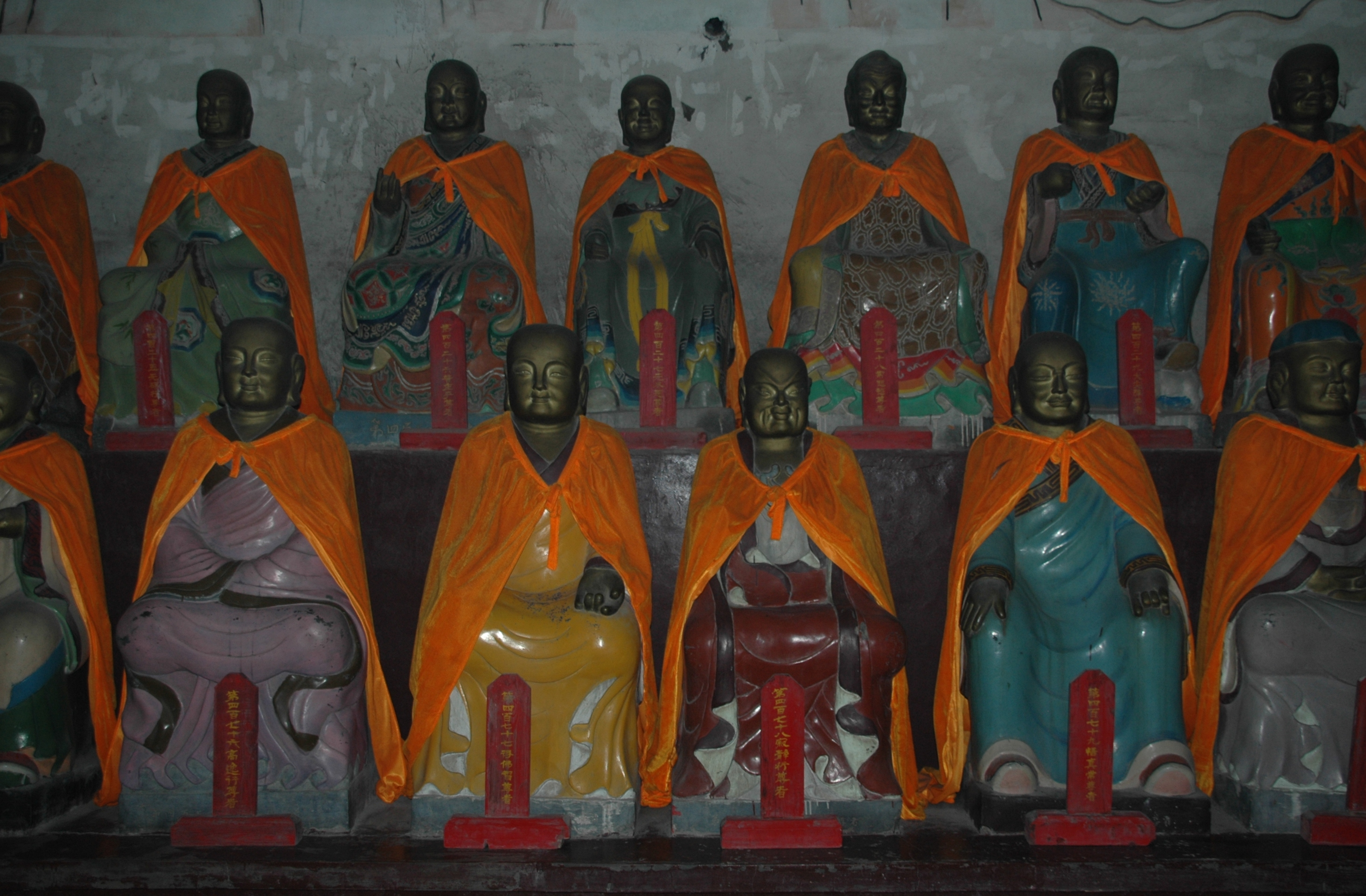
Some of the 500 carved luohan.

The settlement is completely encircled by a fortified stone wall, much like Chengde Mountain Resort. The main entrance is Nantianmen (南天门; 南天門; 'Southern Heavenly Gate'). Inside the wall there are several important cultural sites, which have earned Baodu Zhai a national AAAA rating as a scenic spot, as well as a large area of vegetation and gardens. These sites include the Hall of 500 Luohan, which is a large underground chamber containing 500 carved stone luohan, each in a different pose, and presided over by three golden Buddhas.

Baodu Zhai can be accessed by a footpath leading up from the southeast, or a cable car with a middle station.

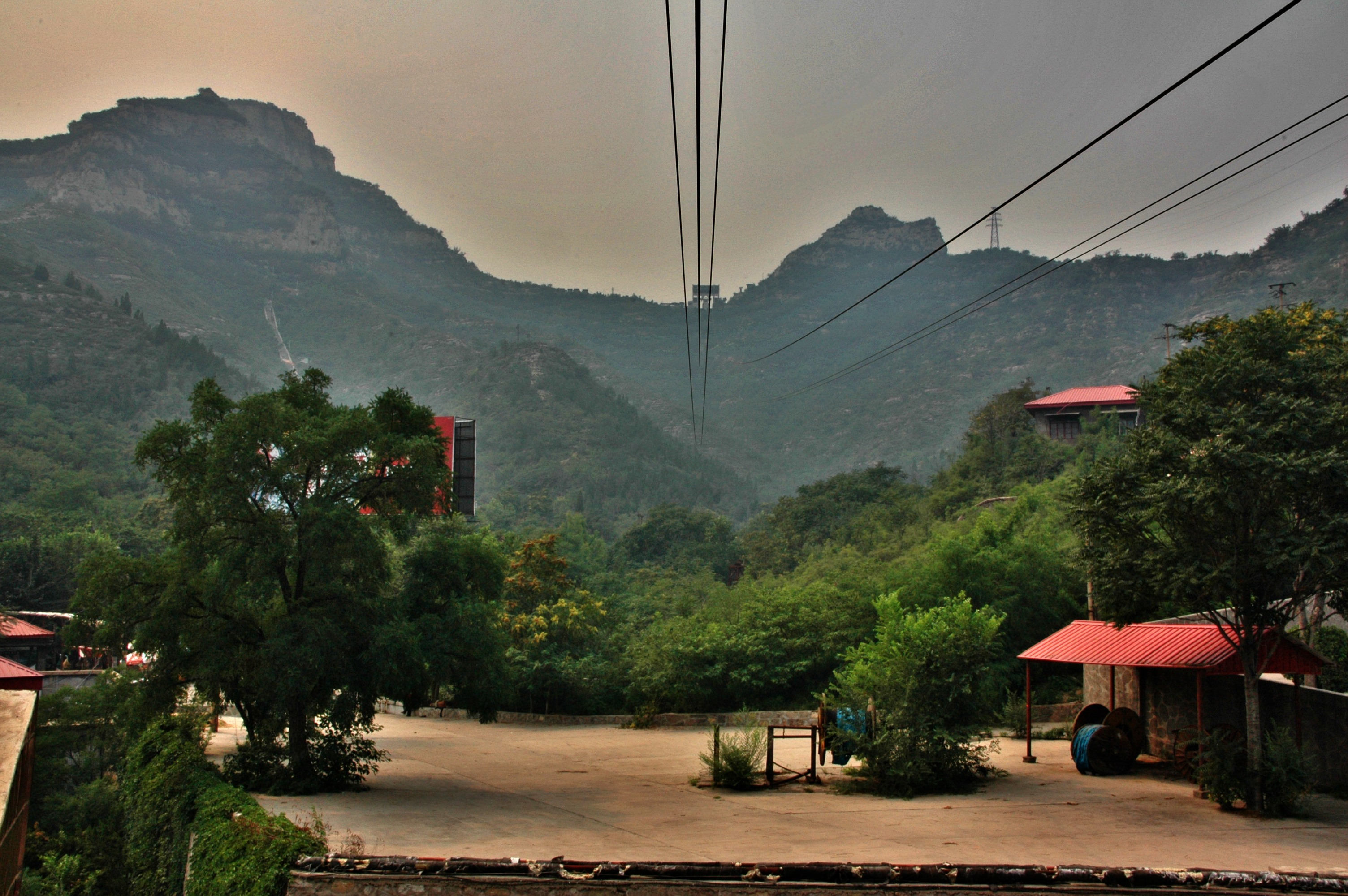
Middle station of the cable car, viewed from the bottom.
