= Ceyu =

Ceyu 测鱼镇
- Town
- Location in Hebei
- Coordinates: 37°47′38″N 114°05′26″E
- Country: People's Republic of China
- Province: Hebei
- Prefecture-level city: Shijiazhuang
- County: Jingxing
- Village-level divisions: 19 villages
- Elevation: 442 m (1,450 ft)
- Time zone: UTC+8 (China Standard)
- Area code: 0311

Ceyu (simplified Chinese: 测鱼; traditional Chinese: 測魚; pinyin: Cèyú) is a town of Jingxing County in the Taihang Mountains of southwestern Hebei province, China, located less than 5 kilometres (3.1 mi) from the border with Shanxi and 27 km (17 mi) south-southwest of the county seat. As of 2011, it has 19 villages under its administration.

== See also ==
- List of township-level divisions of Hebei
