= Siwei Subdistrict =

Coordinates: 38°00′58″N 114°08′51″E

Siwei 四微街道
- Subdistrict

Chinese transcription(s)
- Interactive map of Siwei
- Country: China
- Province: Hebei
- Prefecture: Shijiazhuang
- District: Jingxing Mining District
- Time zone: UTC+8 (China Standard Time)

Siwei Subdistrict (Chinese: 四微街道; pinyin: Sìwēi Jīedào) is a township-level division of Jingxing Mining District, Shijiazhuang, Hebei, China.

== See also ==
- List of township-level divisions of Hebei
