= Huangbizhuang =

Huangbizhuang 黄壁庄镇
- Town
- Location in Hebei
- Coordinates: 38°15′02″N 114°18′55″E
- Country: People's Republic of China
- Province: Hebei
- Prefecture-level city: Shijiazhuang
- District: Luquan
- Village-level divisions: 10 villages
- Elevation: 113 m (371 ft)
- Time zone: UTC+8 (China Standard)
- Area code: 0311

Huangbizhuang (simplified Chinese: 黄壁庄; traditional Chinese: 黃壁莊; pinyin: Huángbìzhuāng) is a town under the administration of Luquan District of Shijiazhuang in southwestern Hebei province, China, located 18 kilometres (11 mi) due north of downtown Luquan. As of 2011, it has 10 villages under its administration.

== See also ==
- List of township-level divisions of Hebei
