= Hengjian Township, Hebei =

Hengjian Township 横涧乡
- Township
- Location in Hebei
- Coordinates: 38°03′55″N 114°03′47″E
- Country: People's Republic of China
- Province: Hebei
- Prefecture-level city: Shijiazhuang
- District: Jingxing
- Village-level divisions: 11 residential communities
- Elevation: 264 m (866 ft)
- Time zone: UTC+8 (China Standard)
- Postal code: 050000
- Area code: 0311

Hengjian Township (simplified Chinese: 横涧乡; traditional Chinese: 橫澗鄉; pinyin: Héngjiàn Xiāng) is a township of Jingxing Mining District, Shijiazhuang, Hebei, People's Republic of China. As of 2011, it has 11 residential communities (居委会) under its administration.

== See also ==
- List of township-level divisions of Hebei
