= Caofang =

Caofang may refer to:

- Caofang Station (草房), Beijing Subway, China
- Caofang Village (曹坊), Bailuquan Township, Shijiazhuang, Hebei Province, China
- Caofang Township (曹坊), Ninghua County, Sanming, Fujian Province, China

== See also ==
- Cao Fang (disambiguation)
