= Sijiazhuang =

Coordinates: 37°56′18″N 114°26′43″E

Sijiazhuang 寺家庄镇
- Town

Chinese transcription(s)
- Interactive map of Sijiazhuang
- Country: China
- Province: Hebei
- Prefecture: Shijiazhuang
- District: Luquan
- Time zone: UTC+8 (China Standard Time)

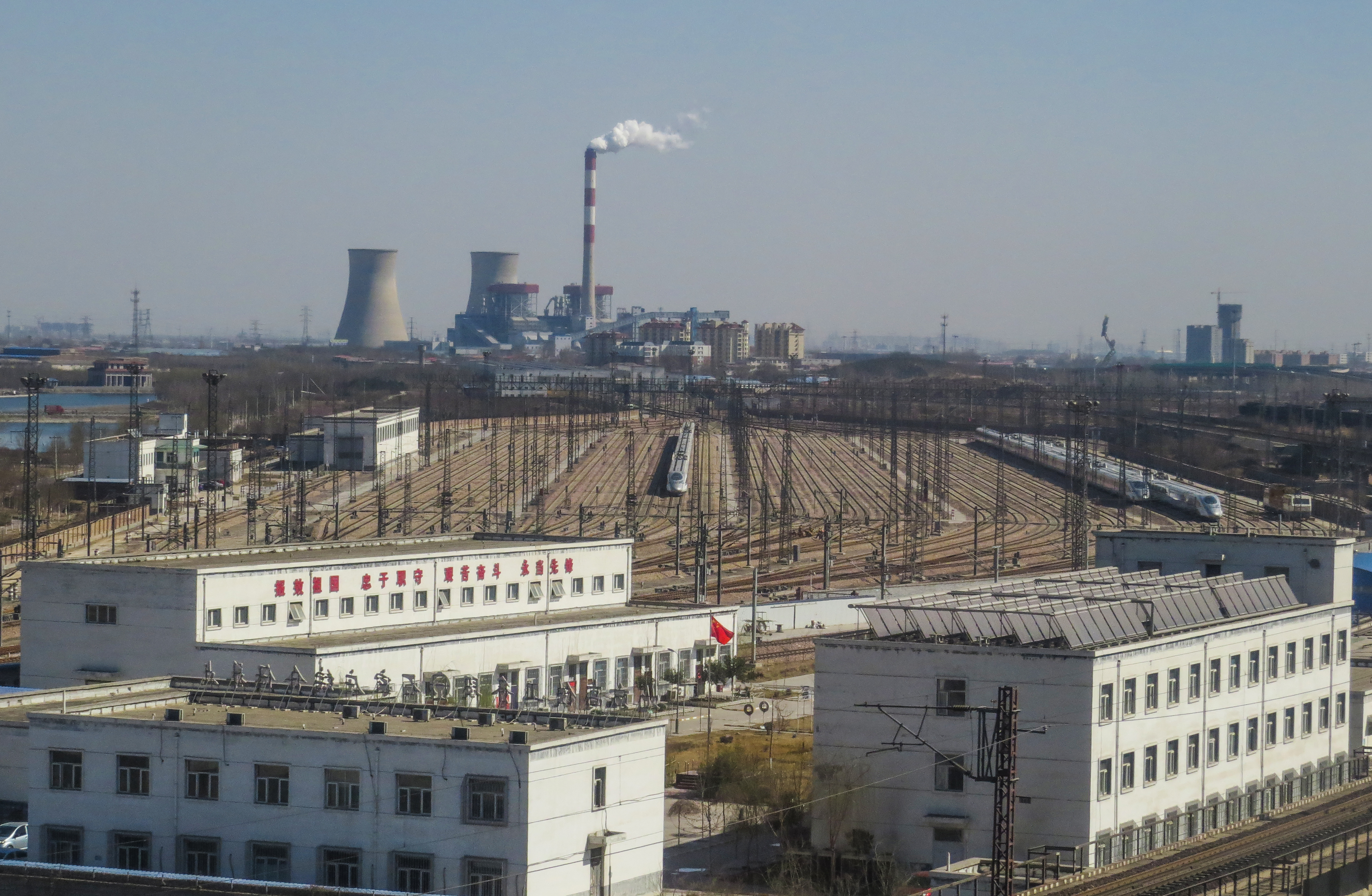
Shijiazhuang EMU Depot

Sijiazhuang (simplified Chinese: 寺家庄; traditional Chinese: 寺家莊; pinyin: Sìjiāzhuāng) is a township-level division of Luquan District, Shijiazhuang, Hebei, China.

== See also ==
- List of township-level divisions of Hebei
