= Nanxing Township =

Nanxing Township 南陉乡
- Township

Chinese transcription(s)
- Interactive map of Nanxing Township
- Coordinates: 38.18187°N 114.0542°E
- Country: China
- Province: Hebei
- Prefecture: Shijiazhuang
- County: Jingxing County
- Time zone: UTC+8 (China Standard Time)

Nanxing Township (Chinese: 南陉乡) is a township-level division of Jingxing County, Shijiazhuang, Hebei, China.

== See also ==
- List of township-level divisions of Hebei
