= Xiulin =

Xiulin may refer to the following places:

- Xiulin, Hebei, a town in Jingxing County, Shijiazhuang, Hebei, China
- Xiulin, Hualien, a township in Hualien County, Taiwan
