= Sunzhuang =

Sunzhuang (孙庄) may refer to the following places in Hebei province, China:

- Sunzhuang Township, Jingxing County
- Sunzhuang Township, Wuqiang County, in Wuqiang County
- Sunzhuang Township, Zhuozhou, in Zhuozhou

== See also ==
- List of township-level divisions of Hebei
