= Fengshan, Shijiazhuang =

Fengshan 凤山镇
- Town
- Location in Hebei
- Coordinates: 38°02′36″N 114°02′33″E
- Country: People's Republic of China
- Province: Hebei
- Prefecture-level city: Shijiazhuang
- District: Jingxing
- Village-level divisions: 9 residential communities
- Elevation: 290 m (950 ft)
- Time zone: UTC+8 (China Standard)
- Area code: 0311

Fengshan (simplified Chinese: 凤山; traditional Chinese: 鳳山; pinyin: Fèngshān; lit. 'phoenix mountain') is a town of Jingxing Mining District, Shijiazhuang, Hebei, People's Republic of China, located in the Taihang Mountains more than 35 kilometres (22 mi) west of downtown Shijiazhuang. As of 2011, it has 9 residential communities (居委会) under its administration.

== See also ==
- List of township-level divisions of Hebei
