= Yujia =

Yujia may refer to:

- Yujia Township, Hebei (于家乡), in Jingxing County
- Yujia Township, Jiangxi (余家乡), in Guixi
- Li Yujia (李羽佳; b. 1983), Chinese Singaporean female badminton player
- Yuja Wang (王羽佳; b. 1987), Chinese classical pianist
- Tao Yujia (b. 1987), Chinese female 100-m sprinter

== Mandarin Chinese Words ==
- Yoga Yújiā (瑜伽)
