= Tongye, Hebei =

Coordinates: 37°58′04″N 114°22′42″E

Tongye 铜冶镇
- Town

Chinese transcription(s)
- Interactive map of Tongye
- Country: China
- Province: Hebei
- Prefecture: Shijiazhuang
- District: Luquan
- Time zone: UTC+8 (China Standard Time)

Tongye (simplified Chinese: 铜冶; traditional Chinese: 銅冶; pinyin: Tóngyě) is a township-level division of Luquan District, Shijiazhuang, Hebei, China.

== See also ==
- List of township-level divisions of Hebei
