= Xinzhuang Township, Jingxing County =

Coordinates: 38°05′21″N 113°53′47″E

Xinzhuang Township, Jingxing County 辛庄乡
- Township

Chinese transcription(s)
- Interactive map of Xinzhuang Township, Jingxing County
- Country: China
- Province: Hebei
- Prefecture: Shijiazhuang
- County: Jingxing County
- Time zone: UTC+8 (China Standard Time)

Xinzhuang Township, Jingxing County (Chinese: 辛庄乡) is a township-level division of Jingxing County, Shijiazhuang, Hebei, China.

== Administrative divisions ==
Xinzhuang Township administers the following areas:

- Xinzhuang Village
- Xiaoliyan Village
- Daliyan Village
- Dongjiazhuang Village
- Shiweng Village
- Nanyaozi Village
- Xiaoyu Village
- Dake Village
- Songshuling Village
- Honghecao Village
- Lianggouqiao Village
- Xiaoqie Village
- Wugong Village
- Sizhanyü Village
- Jingzi Village
- Xiaosi Village
- Luanzhuang Village
- Beiyaozi Village
- Zhangjiakan Village
- Dongxiping Village
- Jiaojianao Village
- Zhangzhuang Village
- Baituling Village
- Jinangou Village
- Taowangzhuang Village
- Xigaojiazhuang Village
- Huren Village
- Waweng Village
- Dawangmiao Village
- Pusayá Village
- Caojiazhuang Village
- Heishuiping Village
- Mitangya Village
- Zhushadong Village
- Daluoshui Village
- Niudao Village
- Sujiazui Village
- Lijiazui Village

== See also ==
- List of township-level divisions of Hebei
