= Shijing Township, Shijiazhuang =

Coordinates: 38.1137°N 114.2727°E

Shijing Township 石井乡
- Township

Chinese transcription(s)
- Interactive map of Shijing Township
- Country: China
- Province: Hebei
- Prefecture: Shijiazhuang
- District: Luquan
- Time zone: UTC+8 (China Standard Time)

Shijing Township (Chinese: 石井乡) is a township-level division of Luquan District, Shijiazhuang, Hebei, China.

== See also ==
- List of township-level divisions of Hebei
