= Shanyincun =

Coordinates: 37.9151°N 114.41261°E

Shanyincun 山尹村镇
- Town

Chinese transcription(s)
- Interactive map of Shanyincun
- Country: China
- Province: Hebei
- Prefecture: Shijiazhuang
- District: Luquan
- Time zone: UTC+8 (China Standard Time)

Shanyincun (Chinese: 山尹村镇) is a township-level division of Luquan District, Shijiazhuang, Hebei, China.

== See also ==
- List of township-level divisions of Hebei
