= Jiazhuang, Hebei =

Jiazhuang 贾庄镇
- Town
- Location in Hebei
- Coordinates: 38°06′17″N 114°02′12″E
- Country: People's Republic of China
- Province: Hebei
- Prefecture-level city: Shijiazhuang
- District: Jingxing Mining
- Village-level divisions: 10 residential communities
- Elevation: 267 m (876 ft)
- Time zone: UTC+8 (China Standard)
- Area code: 0311

Jiazhuang (simplified Chinese: 贾庄; traditional Chinese: 賈莊; pinyin: Jiǎzhuāng) is a town of Jingxing Mining District, Shijiazhuang, Hebei province, China, located in the north of the district. As of 2011, it has 10 residential communities (居委会) under its administration.

== See also ==
- List of township-level divisions of Hebei
