= Nanyu, Hebei =

Coordinates: 37.98811°N 113.93074°E

Nanyu 南峪镇
- Town

Chinese transcription(s)
- Interactive map of Nanyu
- Country: China
- Province: Hebei
- Prefecture: Shijiazhuang
- County: Jingxing County
- Time zone: UTC+8 (China Standard Time)

Nanyu (Chinese: 南峪镇) is a township-level division of Jingxing County, Shijiazhuang, Hebei, China.

== See also ==
- List of township-level divisions of Hebei
