= Shangzhai Township =

Coordinates: 37°56′07″N 114°18′48″E

Shangzhai Township 上寨乡
- Township

Chinese transcription(s)
- Interactive map of Shangzhai Township
- Country: China
- Province: Hebei
- Prefecture: Shijiazhuang
- District: Luquan
- Time zone: UTC+8 (China Standard Time)

Shangzhai Township (Chinese: 上寨乡) is a township-level division of Luquan District, Shijiazhuang, Hebei, China.

== See also ==
- List of township-level divisions of Hebei
