= Yi'an, Shijiazhuang =

Coordinates: 38°11′23″N 114°16′38″E

Yi'an 宜安镇
- Town

Chinese transcription(s)
- Interactive map of Yi'an
- Country: China
- Province: Hebei
- Prefecture: Shijiazhuang
- District: Luquan
- Time zone: UTC+8 (China Standard Time)

Yi'an (Chinese: 宜安镇) is a township-level division of Luquan District, Shijiazhuang, Hebei, China.

== See also ==
- List of township-level divisions of Hebei
