= Xiaozuo =

Xiaozuo may refer to:

- Xiaozuo, Hui'an County (小岞镇), town in Hui'an County, Fujian, China
- Xiaozuo, Jingxing County (小作镇), town in Hebei, China
