= Tianchang, Hebei =

Coordinates: 37°59′55″N 114°01′06″E

Tianchang, Jingxing County 天长镇
- Town

Chinese transcription(s)
- Interactive map of Tianchang, Jingxing County
- Country: China
- Province: Hebei
- Prefecture: Shijiazhuang
- County: Jingxing County
- Time zone: UTC+8 (China Standard Time)

Tianchang, Jingxing County (Chinese: 天长镇) is a township-level division of Jingxing County, Shijiazhuang, Hebei, China.

== See also ==
- List of township-level divisions of Hebei
