= Kuangshi Avenue Subdistrict =

Kuangshi Avenue Subdistrict 矿市街街道
- Subdistrict
- Location in Hebei
- Coordinates: 38°03′48″N 114°03′29″E
- Country: People's Republic of China
- Province: Hebei
- Prefecture-level city: Shijiazhuang
- District: Jingxing Mining
- Village-level divisions: 14 residential communities
- Elevation: 281 m (922 ft)
- Time zone: UTC+8 (China Standard)
- Postal code: 050000
- Area code: 0311

Kuangshi Avenue Subdistrict (simplified Chinese: 矿市街街道; traditional Chinese: 礦市街街道; pinyin: Kuàngshì Jiē Jiēdào) is a subdistrict and the seat of Jingxing Mining District, Shijiazhuang, Hebei, People's Republic of China. As of 2011, it has 14 residential communities (居委会) under its administration.

== See also ==
- List of township-level divisions of Hebei
