= Shang'an, Hebei =

Coordinates: 38°03′42″N 114°12′34″E

Shang'an 上安镇
- Town

Chinese transcription(s)
- Interactive map of Shang'an
- Country: China
- Province: Hebei
- Prefecture: Shijiazhuang
- County: Jingxing County
- Time zone: UTC+8 (China Standard Time)

Shang'an (Chinese: 上安镇) is a township-level division of Jingxing County, Shijiazhuang, Hebei, China.

== See also ==
- List of township-level divisions of Hebei
