= Jingxingkuang, Shijiazhuang =

Jingxingkuang 井陉矿区
- District
- District of Jingxingkuang
- Interactive map of Jingxingkuang
- Location in Hebei
- Coordinates: 38°03′55″N 114°03′44″E
- Country: People's Republic of China
- Province: Hebei
- Prefecture-level city: Shijiazhuang

Area
  - Total: 70.88 km^{2} (27.37 sq mi)
- Elevation: 265 m (869 ft)

Population (2020 census)
  - Total: 77,015
  - Density: 1,087/km^{2} (2,814/sq mi)
- Time zone: UTC+8 (China Standard)
- Postal code: 050100

Jingxingkuang District (Chinese: 井陉矿区; pinyin: Jǐngxíng Kuàngqū) is one of eight districts of the prefecture-level city of Shijiazhuang, the capital of Hebei Province, northern China. It is an enclave of Jingxing County.

== Administrative divisions ==
There are 2 subdistricts (街道), 2 towns (镇), and 1 township (乡) in the district.

Subdistricts:

- Kuangshi Subdistrict (矿市街道), Siwei Subdistrict (四微街道)

Towns:

- Jiazhuang (贾庄镇), Fengshan (凤山镇)

The only township is Hengjian (横涧乡)
