= Hebei Olympic Sports Center Stadium =

Sports venue in Shijiazhuang, China

Hebei Olympic Sports Centre Stadium
- 河北奥林匹克体育中心体育场
- Interactive map of Hebei Olympic Sports Centre Stadium
- Address: Zhengding New District, Shijiazhuang, Hebei Province
- Location: China
- Coordinates: 38.1200°N 114.6355°E
- Owner: Hebei Provincial Government
- Operator: Hebei Olympic Sports Center
- Capacity: 60,000
- Type: Stadium
- Surface: Natural grass (football), Berlin Blue polyurethane (track)
- Field size: 105m × 68m (football pitch)

Construction
- Built: 2013–2017
- Opened: 30 July 2017
- Cost: CNY 3.0532 billion (entire complex)
- Architect: Beijing Architectural Design Institute

Tenant
- Shijiazhuang Yongchang F.C. (2019–2020)

Hebei Olympic Sports Centre Stadium (Chinese: 河北奥林匹克体育中心体育场) is a multi-purpose stadium located in Zhengding New District of Shijiazhuang, Hebei Province, China. It serves as the centerpiece of the Hebei Olympic Sports Center complex, which opened on 30 July 2017. The stadium has a seating capacity of 60,000 and is classified as a Grade-A large-scale stadium.

== Design and construction ==
The stadium was designed by the Beijing Architectural Design Institute with a concept inspired by the ancient Chinese "Si Nan" (south-pointing chariot), symbolizing correct guidance. The design features an integrated spatial structure with a north–south landscape axis connecting entrance plazas to the southern park, and an east–west architectural axis linking the stadium with training facilities.

Construction of the Hebei Olympic Sports Center began in 2013. The entire complex covers 1,118 mu (approximately 74.5 hectares) with a total construction area of 360,000 square meters and a total investment of CNY 3.0532 billion. The stadium itself has a construction area of 118,530 square meters, featuring five above-ground floors and one underground floor.

== Facilities ==
The stadium features a 400-meter "Berlin Blue" polyurethane track that has received dual certification from both the Chinese Athletics Association and World Athletics. The football field measures 105 meters by 68 meters with natural grass surface. The stadium canopy reaches a height of 49 meters, equivalent to a 16-story building.

Additional facilities within the stadium complex include athlete hotels, sports cinemas, and commercial. The overall complex includes a gymnasium complex, swimming and diving hall, tennis center, and comprehensive training facilities.

== Events ==
The stadium's inaugural sporting event was a football friendly match between China League One teams Baoding Rongda and Cangzhou Xinyou on 30 July 2017.

From 2019 to 2020, the stadium served as the home ground for Shijiazhuang Yongchang Football Club in the Chinese League One. On 2 November 2019, the stadium recorded an attendance of 35,613 spectators for a crucial promotion match where Yongchang defeated Xinjiang Tianshan Leopard 2–0 to secure promotion to the Chinese Super League.

The accompanying gymnasium complex has hosted international curling events, including the China Hebei International Mixed Doubles Curling.

== Transportation ==
The stadium is located 20 kilometers from downtown Shijiazhuang and 30 kilometers from Shijiazhuang Zhengding International Airport. Public transportation connections include bus routes and subway access. The facility provides over 2,000 parking spaces.
