= Bailuquan Township =

Bailuquan Township 白鹿泉乡
- Township
- Location in Hebei
- Coordinates: 38°04′14″N 114°16′57″E
- Country: People's Republic of China
- Province: Hebei
- Prefecture-level city: Shijiazhuang
- District: Luquan
- Village-level divisions: 17 villages

Area
  - Total: 41.86 km^{2} (16.16 sq mi)
- Elevation: 140 m (460 ft)

Population (2004)
  - Total: 9,169
- Time zone: UTC+8 (China Standard)
- Area code: 0311

Bailuquan (Chinese: 白鹿泉; pinyin: Báilùquán) is a township under the administration of Luquan District of Shijiazhuang in southwestern Hebei province, China.

The township is located just to the southwest of Luquan District and 23 kilometres (14 mi) by road west of Shijiazhuang in the eastern foothills of the Taihang Mountains.

The township covers an area of 41.86 square kilometres (16.16 sq mi) and had a population of 9169 in 2004.

== Administrative divisions ==
The township contains the following villages:

- Dongtumen Village (东土门村委会)
- Xitumen Village (西土门村委会)
- Qiezhuang Village (郄庄村委会)
- Zaolin Village (枣林村委会)
- Caofang Village (曹坊村委会)
- Bailuquan Village (白鹿泉村委会)
- Donghushen Village (东胡申村委会)
- Xihushen Village (西胡申村委会)
- Gujiayu Village (谷家峪村委会)
- Xixuezhuang Village (西薛庄村委会)
- Xiyangzhuang Village (西杨庄村委会)
- Duanzhuang Village (段庄村委会)
- Shuiyu Village (水峪村委会)
- Shangniezhuang Village (上聂庄村委会)
- Helianyu Village (荷莲峪村委会)
- Wuzhuang Village (武庄村委会)
- Liangzhuang Village (粱庄村委会)

== See also ==
- List of township-level divisions of Hebei
