= Shangzhuang, Shijiazhuang =

Coordinates: 38°02′10″N 114°22′35″E

Shangzhuang 上庄镇
- Town

Chinese transcription(s)
- Interactive map of Shangzhuang
- Country: China
- Province: Hebei
- Prefecture: Shijiazhuang
- District: Luquan
- Time zone: UTC+8 (China Standard Time)

Shangzhuang (simplified Chinese: 上庄; traditional Chinese: 上莊; pinyin: Shàngzhuāng) is a township-level division of Luquan District, Shijiazhuang, Hebei, China.

== See also ==
- List of township-level divisions of Hebei
