= Licun, Shijiazhuang =

Licun 李村镇
- Town
- Location in Hebei
- Coordinates: 38°11′44″N 114°20′32″E
- Country: People's Republic of China
- Province: Hebei
- Prefecture-level city: Shijiazhuang
- District: Luquan
- Village-level divisions: 23 villages
- Elevation: 107 m (351 ft)
- Time zone: UTC+8 (China Standard)
- Area code: 0311

Licun (Chinese: 李村; pinyin: Lǐcūn) is a town under the administration of Luquan District, Shijiazhuang, in southwestern Hebei province, China, located 12 kilometres (7.5 mi) north-northeast of downtown Luquan District and in the northwestern suburbs of Shijiazhuang. As of 2011, it has 23 villages under its administration.

== See also ==
- List of township-level divisions of Hebei
