= Xiulin, Hebei =

Coordinates: 37°59′03″N 114°05′34″E

Xiulin, Jingxing County 秀林镇
- Town

Chinese transcription(s)
- Interactive map of Xiulin, Jingxing County
- Country: China
- Province: Hebei
- Prefecture: Shijiazhuang
- County: Jingxing County
- Time zone: UTC+8 (China Standard Time)

Xiulin, Jingxing County (Chinese: 秀林镇) is a township-level division of Jingxing County, Shijiazhuang, Hebei, China.

== See also ==
- List of township-level divisions of Hebei
