= Weishui, Hebei =

Coordinates: 38°01′23″N 114°08′45″E

Weishui 微水镇
- Town

Chinese transcription(s)
- Interactive map of Weishui
- Country: China
- Province: Hebei
- Prefecture: Shijiazhuang
- County: Jingxing County
- Time zone: UTC+8 (China Standard Time)

Weishui (Chinese: 微水镇) is a township-level division of Jingxing County, Shijiazhuang, Hebei, China.

== See also ==
- List of township-level divisions of Hebei
