= Yujia Township, Hebei =

Coordinates: 37.94126°N 114.02872°E

Yujia Township 于家乡
- Township

Chinese transcription(s)
- Interactive map of Yujia Township
- Country: China
- Province: Hebei
- Prefecture: Shijiazhuang
- County: Jingxing County
- Time zone: UTC+8 (China Standard Time)

Yujia Township (Chinese: 于家乡) is a township-level division of Jingxing County, Shijiazhuang, Hebei, China.

== See also ==
- List of township-level divisions of Hebei
