= Shijiazhuang Donghua Jinlong =

Chinese chemical company

Shijiazhuang Donghua Jinlong Chemical Group Co., LTD
- Industry: Chemicals
- Founded: 1979
- Headquarters: Shijiazhuang, Hebei, China
- Key people: Zhang Jianfei (Chairman)
- Number of employees: ~1,000
- Website: glycine.com.cn

Shijiazhuang Donghua Jinlong
- Traditional Chinese: 石家莊東華金龍
- Simplified Chinese: 石家庄东华金龙
Transcriptions
Standard Mandarin
- Hanyu Pinyin: shíjiāzhuāng dōnghuá jīnlóng

Shijiazhuang Donghua Jinlong Chemical Co., LTD (Chinese: 石家庄东华金龙; pinyin: Shíjiāzhuāng dōng huá jīnlóng) is a Chinese chemical company based in Shijiazhuang, Hebei. Established in 1979, the company's main products include many types of glycine, such as industrial-grade glycine, refined glycine, as well as glycine derivatives. It is regarded as a key player in the global glycine market.

== Social media ==
In October 2023, Donghua Jinlong began posting short promotional videos showcasing their expertise and prominent role in the manufacturing of glycine on the social media platform TikTok. As a result of TikTok's recommendation algorithm, these videos appeared on many users' "for you page", which displays a feed of recommended videos to TikTok users. On March 31st 2024, a TikTok user posted a parody of one of these commercials, using an AI voice imitation of Red Scare podcaster Dasha Nekrasova, with the video receiving over 124,800 plays and 13,500 likes in two days.

Subsequently, Donghua Jinlong became a meme amongst TikTok users, in which they expressed a tongue-in-cheek excitement towards the chemical manufacturer and its industry-specific content online. Many "fan-made" infomercials praising the company and its products have since been posted online. As of June 2024 over 200 Donghua Jinlong-related products including t-shirts were listed on Amazon.
