= Sunzhuang Township, Jingxing County =

Coordinates: 38°09′10″N 114°08′23″E

Sunzhuang Township, Jingxing County 孙庄乡
- Township

Chinese transcription(s)
- Interactive map of Sunzhuang Township, Jingxing County
- Country: China
- Province: Hebei
- Prefecture: Shijiazhuang
- County: Jingxing County
- Time zone: UTC+8 (China Standard Time)

Sunzhuang Township, Jingxing County (Chinese: 孙庄乡) is a township-level division of Jingxing County, Shijiazhuang, Hebei, China.

== See also ==
- List of township-level divisions of Hebei
