= Mount Cangyan =

Mountain in the country of China

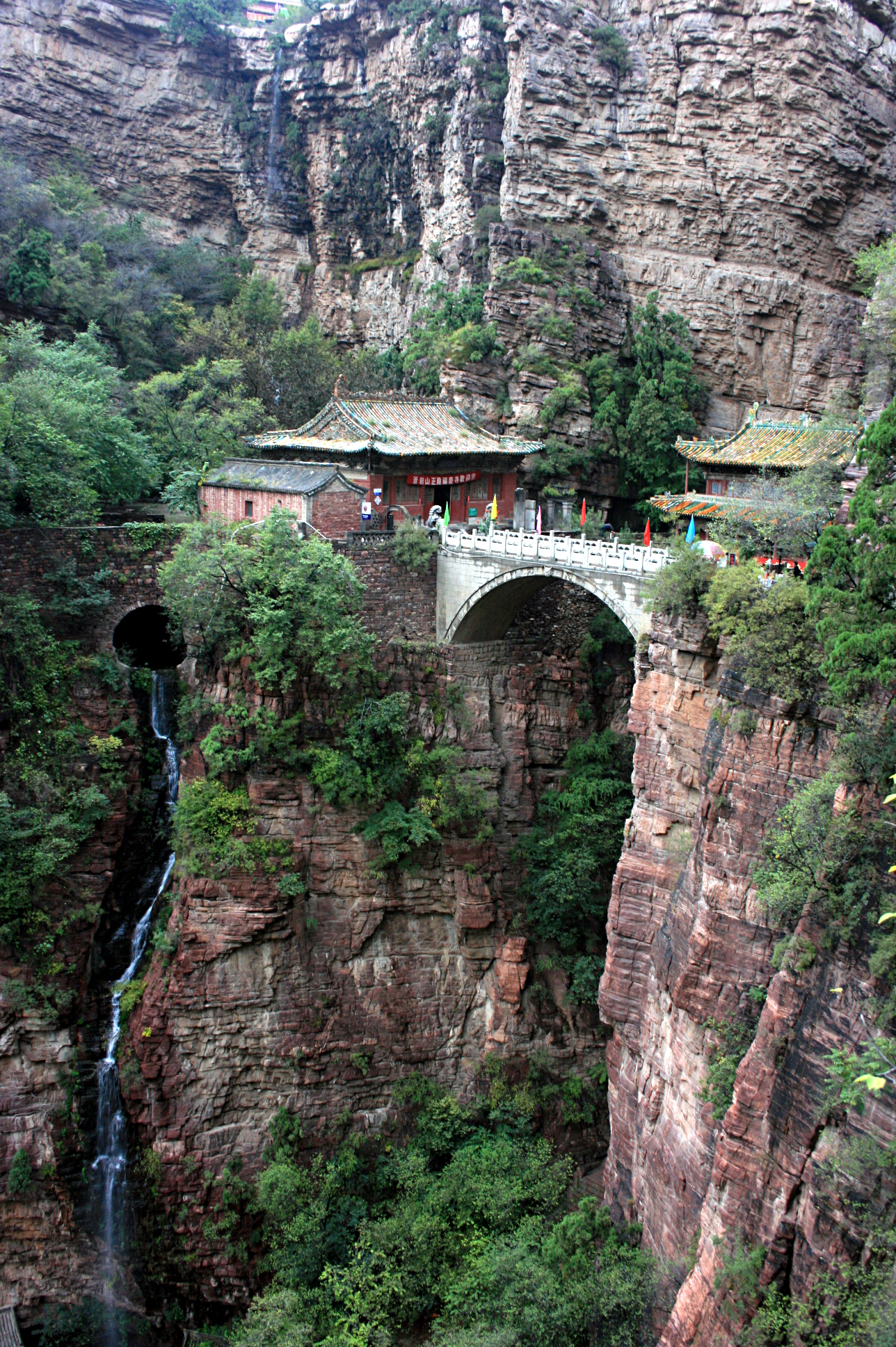
- Mount Cangyan in September 2007

Highest point
- Coordinates: 37°49′45.94″N 114°8′11.60″E

Geography
- Location within China
- Country: People's Republic of China
- Province: Hebei
- County: Jingxing
- Parent range: Taihang Mountains

Mount Cangyan (Chinese: 苍岩山; pinyin: Cāngyán Shān; lit. 'Green Cliff Mountain') is a scenic area in Jingxing County, Hebei Province, China, famous for its combination of natural mountain scenery with historical man-made structures. It is located approximately 50 kilometres (31 mi) southwest of the provincial capital Shijiazhuang and close to the border with Shanxi Province.

== Geography ==
Mount Cangyan forms the eastern tip of the Taihang Mountain Range (Chinese: 太行山; pinyin: Tàiháng Shān), its tallest peak has an altitude of 1,000 metres (3,281 ft). The scenic area covers 63 square kilometres (180 square kilometres according to other counts). The vegetation of the area is a forest of cypress and blue sandalwood (Pteroceltis tatarinowii) trees.

== History ==
The most famous building complex on Mount Cangyan is the Fortune Celebration Temple (Chinese: 福庆寺; pinyin: Fúqìng Sì). It was first erected during the Sui dynasty(late 6th to early 7th century) and is said to have been the place where Princess Nan Yang, the daughter of the Sui Emperor Yang, practiced Buddhism. The various structures of the Fortune Celebration Temple (the Tablets House, the Hall of the Heavenly Kings, the Hall of the Giant Buddha, the Bridge-Tower Hall, the Buddhist Canon Depository) are well integrated into the mountain topography. The central landmark of the complex is the Bridge-Tower Hall (Chinese: 桥楼殿; pinyin: Qiáolóu Diàn). As the name suggests, it is supported by a stone arch bridge spanning a narrow gorge. The bridge has a span of 15 m (49 ft) and stands 52 m (171 ft) above ground, it is constructed from 365 stone blocks. Under the bridge a stone staircase with more than 360 steps leads up to the summit.

== Use in cinema ==
The first known use of the setting in cinema was in the award-winning 1954 film Letter with Feather. The 1986 Chinese TV series Journey to the West brought the mountain to the attention of Chinese audiences. It achieved equal fame in the West when it was used as a setting for the 2000 film Crouching Tiger, Hidden Dragon, which fictionally located it within the Wudang Mountains.

It was also used in the opening sequence of The Mummy: Tomb of the Dragon Emperor as well as lesser known Chinese films such as The Butterfly Lovers and Mulan: Rise of a Warrior.
