= Huolu =

Huolu 获鹿镇
- Town
- Location in Hebei
- Coordinates: 38°05′15″N 114°18′57″E
- Country: People's Republic of China
- Province: Hebei
- Prefecture-level city: Shijiazhuang
- District: Luquan
- Village-level divisions: 12 residential communities 27 villages
- Elevation: 118 m (387 ft)
- Time zone: UTC+8 (China Standard)
- Postal code: 050200
- Area code: 0311

Huolu or Huailu (simplified Chinese: 获鹿; traditional Chinese: 獲鹿; pinyin: Huòlù/Huáilù) is a town and the seat of Luquan District of Shijiazhuang in the eastern foothills of the Taihang Mountains in southwestern Hebei province, China, As of 2011, it has 12 residential communities (居委会) and 27 villages under its administration.

== See also ==
- List of township-level divisions of Hebei
