= Taiping River =

River in Hebei, China

Taiping River (Chinese: 太平河) is a river in Hebei Province, China. It originates from the foot of Jing Fan Mountain and enters Jin Jiang River. It travels a distance of 12.8 kilometers, during which there are both peaceful and swift torrents and many tortuous river channels. It is mainly located in the southwest of Shi Jiangzhuang, the capital of Hei Bei province and plays a role of releasing flood waters and supplying drinking water for citizens in Shi Jiazhuang. The river wasn't included in city management and bore the brunt of sanitary sewage discharged by citizens around, so it got seriously polluted. The situation didn't get the attention of the people, or help from the city management. Recently, the City Hall of Shi Jiazhuang has claimed that great efforts will be made to improve both the environment and the human settlement, so as to achieve a more prosperous cultured and harmonious Shi Jiazhuang, Taiping is on the agenda. Taiping is expected to be transformed into a scenic region and it will not be just a little-known river.
