= Cao Fang (singer) =

Chinese singer-songwriter

Cao Fang 曹方
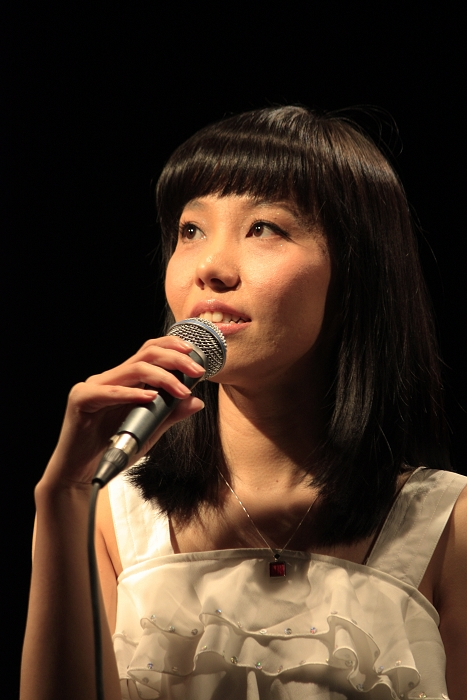
- November 11, 2009 the Chinese mainland singer Cao Fang on conference of her new album
- Born: May 6, 1983 (age 42); Xishuangbanna, Yunnan, China
- Occupations: Singer, songwriter,
- Years active: 2003–present

Chinese name
- Traditional Chinese: 曹方
- Simplified Chinese: 曹方
Transcriptions
Standard Mandarin
- Hanyu Pinyin: cáo fāng
- Musical career
- Also known as: 班長, ICY
- Origin: China
- Genres: Mandarin pop
- Instrument: Melodica
- Labels: ICY Studio
- Website: Caofang's Official blog

Cao Fang (曹方; formerly 曹芳; born May 6, 1983, in Xishuangbanna, Yunnan) is a Chinese indie pop singer-songwriter and melodica player. She sings in Mandarin. Her music style has drawn comparisons to The Cranberries and Faye Wong. Some of her songs show the influence of trip hop, bossa nova, and the music of China's ethnic minorities, such as the Jino people, whom she visited in Xishuangbanna as a child.

In 1996 she went to Kunming to study. In high school, she began writing songs and joined a band. The band recorded a demo, which impressed the musician Xiao Ke, who heard it in approximately 2001 while recording traditional music in Yunnan, but was unable to locate her. Several months later, she came to Beijing for a university students' original music competition, for which Xiao Ke was a judge; she won the awards for best lyrics and best group, and Xiao Ke invited her to join the label he had founded.

Cao moved to Beijing in 2002, where she began working as an assistant at Xiao Ke's label. Soon thereafter she signed to the label. She released her first CD, Black Perfume (黑色香水), in 2003. The album was poorly promoted and sold poorly, but she gradually achieved renown via discussion of her works on Chinese blogs.

Her second album, Meet Me (遇见我), was released in 2005 on the Tai You Wen Hua (钛友文化) label, selling over 100,000 copies and winning several awards. In the same year, she changed the written form of her name from 曹 芳 to 曹 方. Her five-track EP, Farther Than the Sky (比天空还远), was released on her own label in late 2007.

In 2008, GE Healthcare used her song "In Summer" (在夏天) in a television commercial for Healthcare Re-imagined. She has also composed songs for several other Chinese singers, including Jin Haixin, Qin Hailu, and the first Super Girl winner An Youqi.

Her hobbies include drawing and lomography.
