= Luquan, Shijiazhuang =

Luquan 鹿泉区
- District
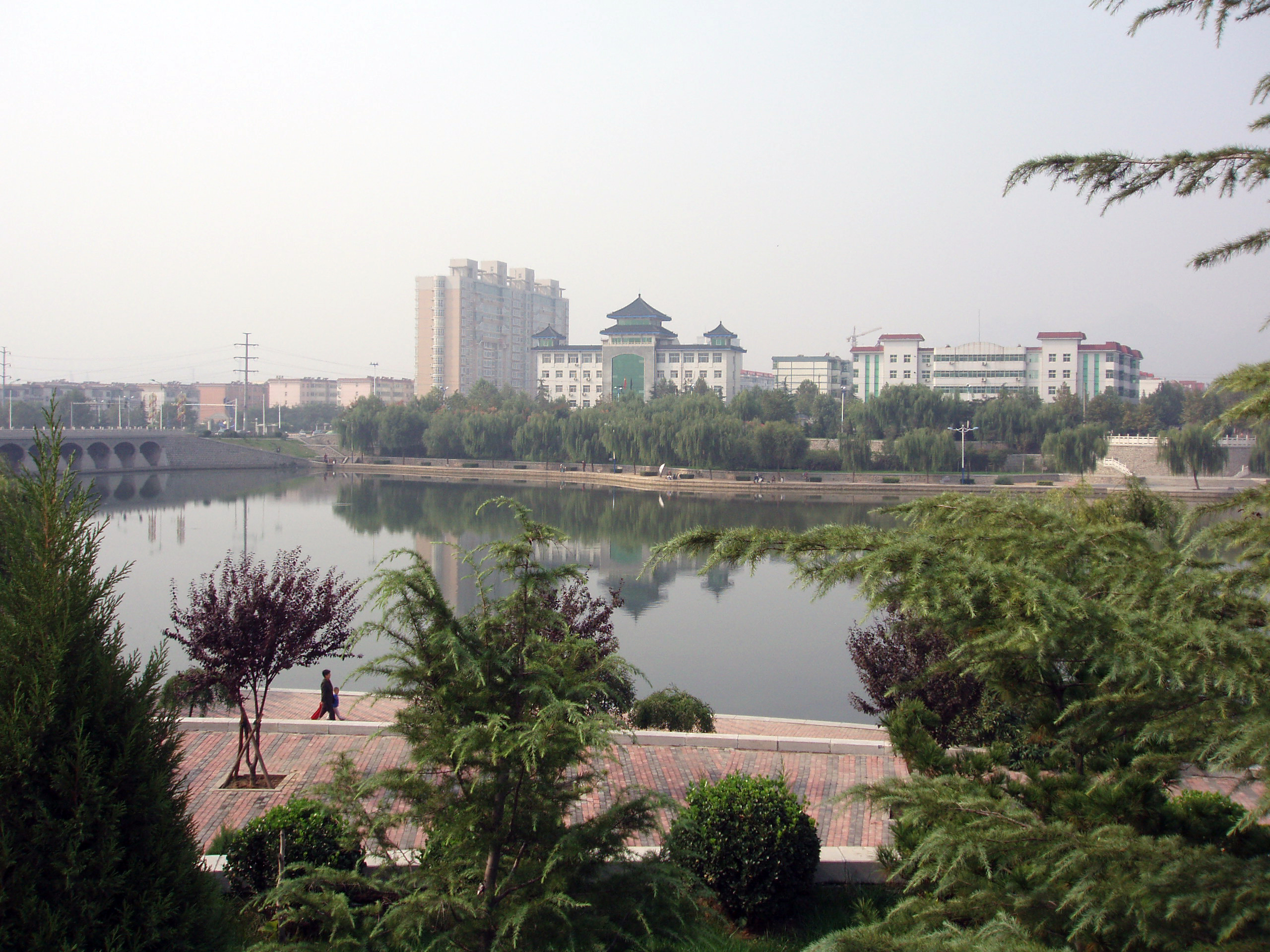
- Interactive map of Luquan
- Location in Hebei/Shijiazhuang Luquan (Shijiazhuang)
- Coordinates: 38°05′10″N 114°18′50″E
- Country: China
- Province: Hebei
- Prefecture-level city: Shijiazhuang

Area
  - Total: 614.3 km^{2} (237.2 sq mi)

Population (2020 census)
  - Total: 588,279
  - Density: 957.6/km^{2} (2,480/sq mi)
- Time zone: UTC+8 (China Standard)
- Postal code: 050200

Luquan (Chinese: 鹿泉; pinyin: Lùquán; lit. 'Deer Spring'), formerly Huailu County (Note: The character 获/獲 has the pronunciation "huái" specific for this place name instead of "huò" in normal cases.) (simplified Chinese: 获鹿县; traditional Chinese: 獲鹿縣; pinyin: Huáilù Xiàn) until 1994, is one of the eight districts of the prefecture-level city of Shijiazhuang, the capital of Hebei Province, North China. Luquan lies in the foothills of the Taihang Mountains and is around 17 kilometres (11 mi) west of the provincial capital, Shijiazhuang, which administers Luquan. The town of Huolu, locally pronounced "Huailu", is the urban center of Luquan District.

== Administrative divisions ==
There are nine towns and three townships.

Towns:

- Huolu (获鹿镇), Tongye (铜冶镇), Sijiazhuang (寺家庄镇), Shangzhuang (上庄镇), Licun (李村镇), Yi'an (宜安镇), Huangbizhuang (黄壁庄镇), Dahe (大河镇), Shanyincun (山尹村镇)

Townships:

- Shijing Township (石井乡), Bailuquan Township (白鹿泉乡), Shangzhai Township (上寨乡)
