= Jingxing County =

Jingxing County 井陉县
- County
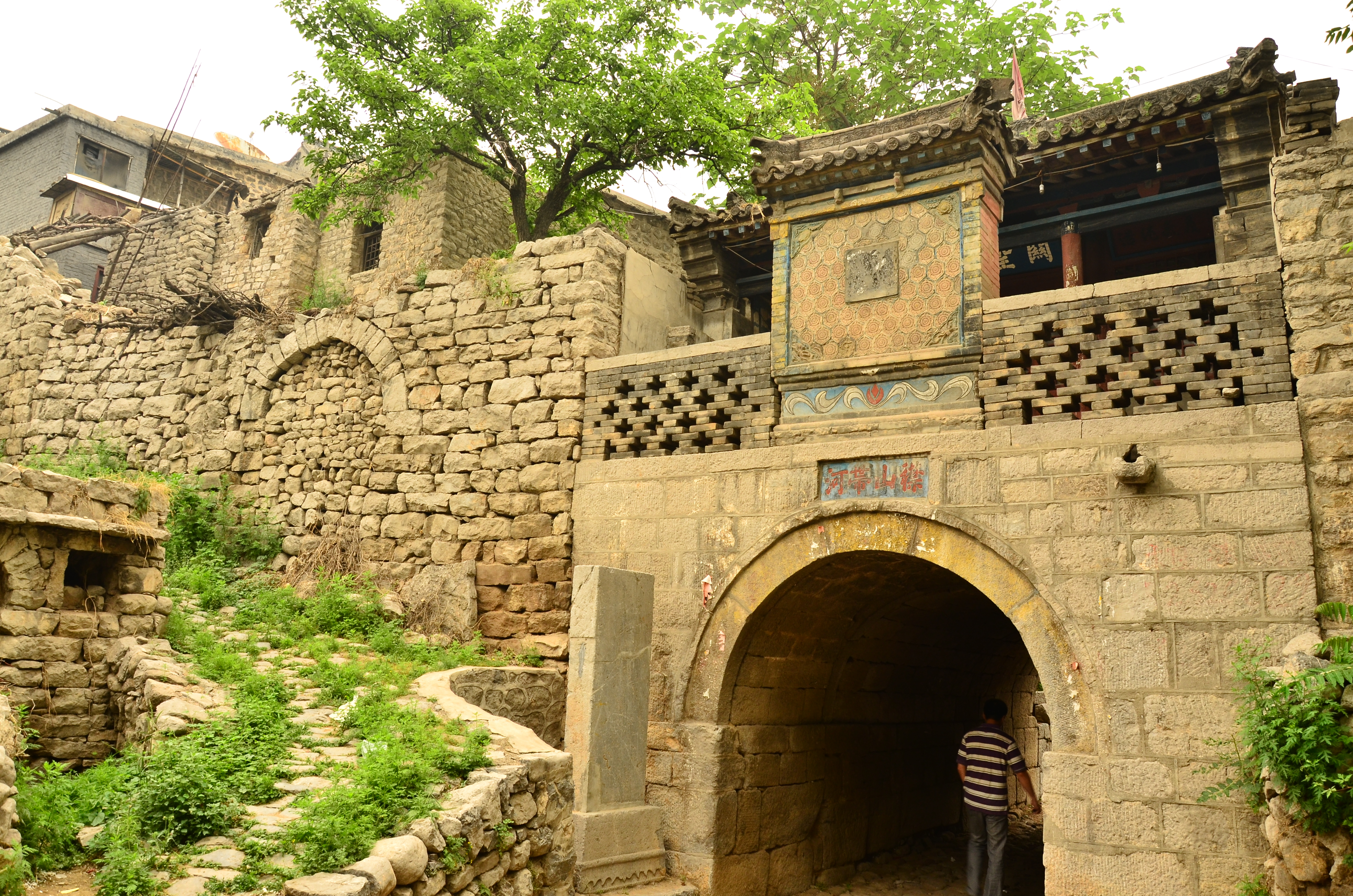
- Historic architecture in the village of Daliangjiang (大梁江村), a National Historical and Cultural Village
- Interactive map of Jingxing County
- Location in Hebei
- Coordinates: 38°01′56″N 114°08′43″E
- Country: People's Republic of China
- Province: Hebei
- Prefecture-level city: Shijiazhuang

Area
  - Total: 1,380 km^{2} (530 sq mi)

Population (2020 census)
  - Total: 250,989
  - Density: 182/km^{2} (471/sq mi)
- Time zone: UTC+8 (China Standard)
- Postal code: 050300
- Area code: 0311
- Website: www.sjzjx.gov.cn

Jingxing County (simplified Chinese: 井陉县; traditional Chinese: 井陘縣; pinyin: Jǐngxíng Xiàn; lit. 'Well Border') is a county of Hebei Province, North China, under the administration of the prefecture-level city of Shijiazhuang, the capital of the province.

When King Mu of Zhou went hunting in the region, he described the terrain as "the surrounding is high while the center is deep, like a well, [making the region] resemble the border of a stove", hence the name of the county.

According to archeological discoveries, there were inhabitants settled in Dongyuan Village (東元村) during the Stone Age.

== Administrative divisions ==
There are 10 towns and 7 townships under the county's administration.

Towns:

- Weishui (微水镇), Shang'an (上安镇), Tianchang (天长镇), Xiulin (秀林镇), Nanyu (南峪镇), Weizhou (威州镇), Xiaozuo (小作镇), Nanzhangcheng (南障城镇), Cangyanshan (苍岩山镇), Ceyu (测鱼镇)

Townships:

- Wujiayao Township (吴家窑乡), Beizheng Township (北正乡), Yujia Township (于家乡), Sunzhuang Township (孙庄乡), Nanxing Township (南陉乡), Xinzhuang Township (辛庄乡), Nanwangzhuang Township (南王庄乡)

== Climate ==
Climate data for Jingxing, elevation 256 m (840 ft), (1991–2020 normals, extremes 1981–2010)
Month	Jan	Feb	Mar	Apr	May	Jun	Jul	Aug	Sep	Oct	Nov	Dec	Year
Record high °C (°F)	16.8 (62.2)	26.5 (79.7)	32.1 (89.8)	36.4 (97.5)	40.6 (105.1)	42.6 (108.7)	42.1 (107.8)	39.6 (103.3)	38.8 (101.8)	32.2 (90.0)	27.2 (81.0)	22.9 (73.2)	42.6 (108.7)
Mean daily maximum °C (°F)	3.6 (38.5)	7.4 (45.3)	14.4 (57.9)	21.8 (71.2)	27.4 (81.3)	31.6 (88.9)	31.6 (88.9)	29.9 (85.8)	26.2 (79.2)	20.3 (68.5)	11.9 (53.4)	5.3 (41.5)	19.3 (66.7)
Daily mean °C (°F)	−2.1 (28.2)	1.3 (34.3)	8.1 (46.6)	15.3 (59.5)	21.2 (70.2)	25.5 (77.9)	26.6 (79.9)	24.9 (76.8)	20.3 (68.5)	13.9 (57.0)	6.0 (42.8)	−0.1 (31.8)	13.4 (56.1)
Mean daily minimum °C (°F)	−6.3 (20.7)	−3.1 (26.4)	2.9 (37.2)	9.6 (49.3)	15.3 (59.5)	19.9 (67.8)	22.4 (72.3)	21.0 (69.8)	15.8 (60.4)	9.3 (48.7)	1.7 (35.1)	−4.0 (24.8)	8.7 (47.7)
Record low °C (°F)	−15.5 (4.1)	−14.1 (6.6)	−7.5 (18.5)	−1.4 (29.5)	5.1 (41.2)	10.1 (50.2)	15.5 (59.9)	13.5 (56.3)	5.8 (42.4)	−1.9 (28.6)	−9.6 (14.7)	−15.8 (3.6)	−15.8 (3.6)
Average precipitation mm (inches)	3.5 (0.14)	5.7 (0.22)	9.6 (0.38)	24.9 (0.98)	39.2 (1.54)	53.3 (2.10)	127.0 (5.00)	135.7 (5.34)	58.2 (2.29)	28.2 (1.11)	15.9 (0.63)	3.3 (0.13)	504.5 (19.86)
Average precipitation days (≥ 0.1 mm)	1.9	2.8	2.9	5.5	6.9	9.1	12.5	11.9	8.1	6.3	3.5	1.9	73.3
Average snowy days	3.1	3.2	1.6	0.2	0	0	0	0	0	0	2.0	2.6	12.7
Average relative humidity (%)	52	49	45	48	52	56	72	76	71	64	58	52	58
Mean monthly sunshine hours	147.8	155.4	200.6	223.8	251.9	217.0	173.7	177.6	183.0	177.6	152.3	148.6	2,209.3
Percentage possible sunshine	48	51	54	56	57	49	39	43	50	52	51	50	50
Source: China Meteorological Administration

== Films ==
The 2018 film An Elephant Sitting Still was filmed in Jingxing County.
