= Shijiazhuang =

Capital of Hebei, China

Shijiazhuang 石家庄市 Shihkiachwang, Shimen
- Prefecture-level city
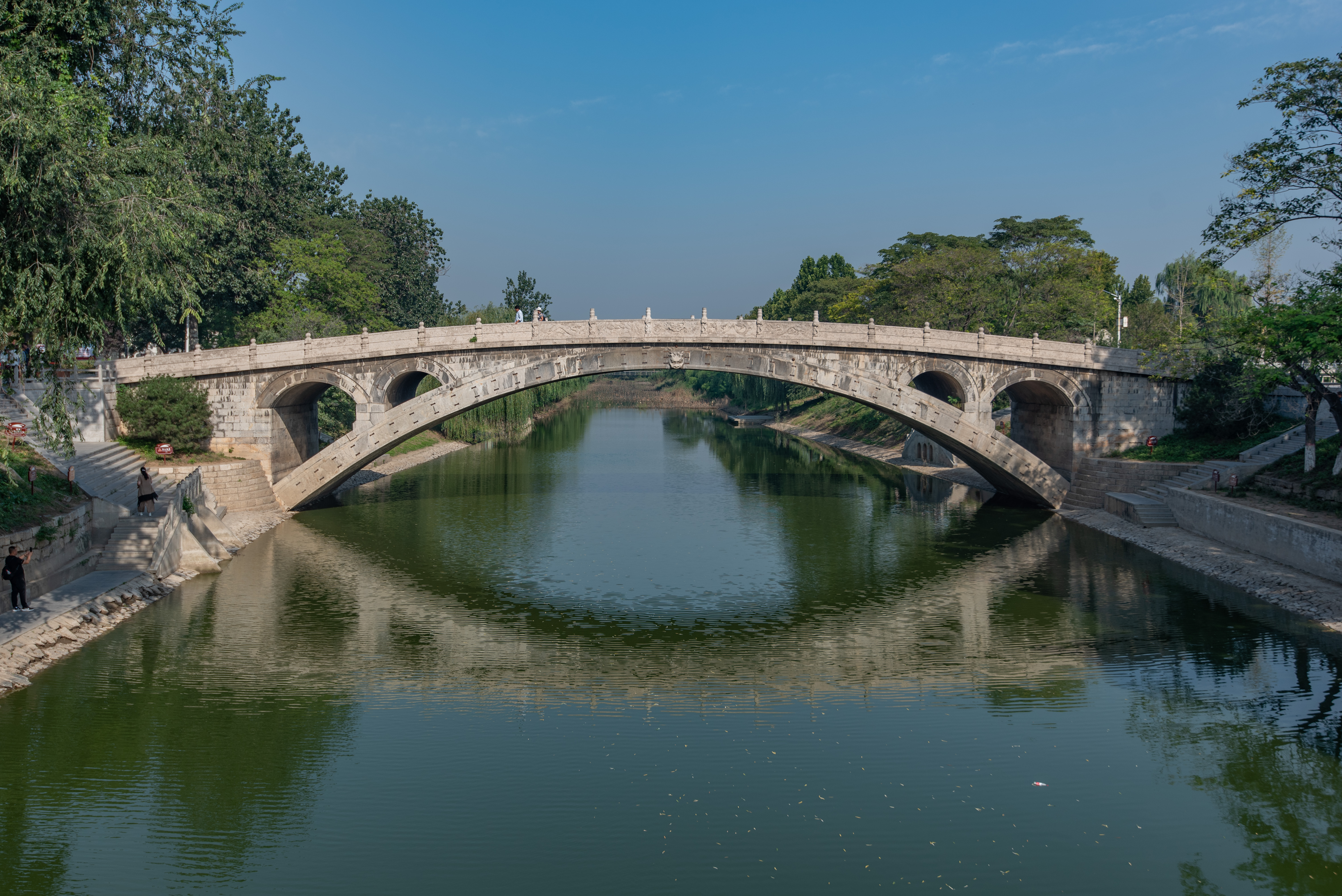
- Zhengtai Square at night Liberation Memorial Hall Hebei Provincial Museum Chang'an Park Anji Bridge Zhengding City Wall

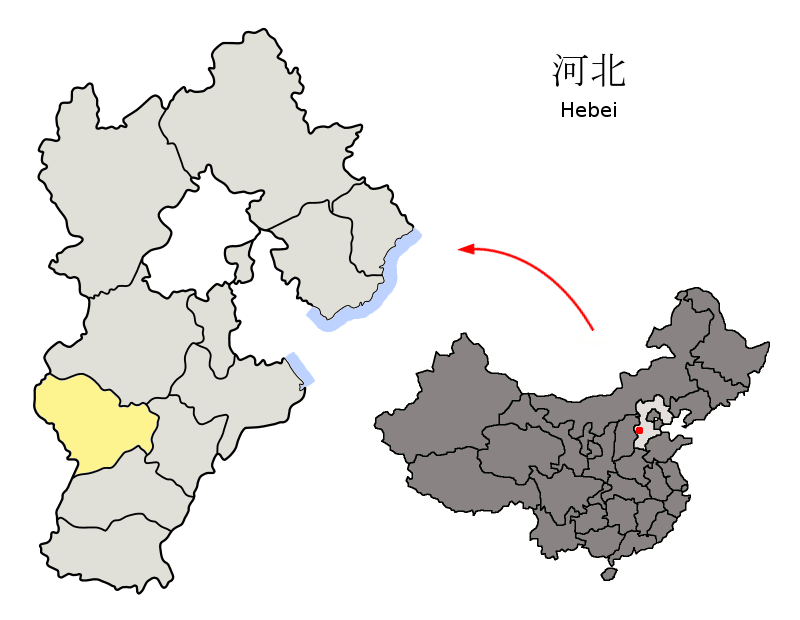
- Location of Shijiazhuang City jurisdiction in Hebei

- Location of the city center in Hebei Shijiazhuang (Northern China) Shijiazhuang (China)
- Coordinates (Hebei People's Government): 38°02′33″N 114°30′36″E
- Country: China
- Province: Hebei
- Settled: 204 B.C. (Changshan Commandery)
- Established: June 24, 1925
- Municipal seat: Chang'an District

Government
  - Type: Prefecture-level city
  - Body: Shijiazhuang Municipal People's Congress
  - CCP Secretary: Zhang Chaochao
  - Congress Chairman: Li Xuerong
  - Mayor: Ma Yujun
  - CPPCC Chairman: Zhang Ye

Area
  - Prefecture-level city: 14,072 km^{2} (5,433 sq mi)
  - Urban: 2,256.6 km^{2} (871.3 sq mi)
  - Metro: 2,664.2 km^{2} (1,028.7 sq mi)
- Elevation: 83 m (272 ft)

Population (2020 census)
  - Prefecture-level city: 11,235,086
  - Density: 798.40/km^{2} (2,067.8/sq mi)
  - Urban: 5,758,403
  - Urban density: 2,551.8/km^{2} (6,609.1/sq mi)
  - Metro: 6,230,709
  - Metro density: 2,338.7/km^{2} (6,057.2/sq mi)
- Demonym(s): Shijiazhuangnese, Villager (colloq.)

GDP
  - Prefecture-level city: CN¥ 820 billion US$ 115 billion
  - Per capita: CN¥ 73,016; US$ 10,253
- Time zone: UTC+8 (China Standard)
- Postal code: 050000
- ISO 3166 code: CN-HE-01
- Licence plate prefixes: 冀A
- City Flower: Rosa Chinensis
- City Tree: Styphnolobium
- GaWC World City level classification: Sufficiency
- Website: www.SJZ.gov.cn

Shijiazhuang
- "Shijiazhuang" in Simplified (top) and Traditional (bottom) Chinese characters
- Simplified Chinese: 石家庄
- Traditional Chinese: 石家莊
- Postal: Shihkiachwang
- Literal meaning: "Shi Family Village"
Transcriptions
Standard Mandarin
- Hanyu Pinyin: Shíjiāzhuāng
- Bopomofo: ㄕˊ ㄐㄧㄚ ㄓㄨㄤ
- Gwoyeu Romatzyh: Shyrjiajuang
- Wade–Giles: Shih^{2}-chia^{1}-chuang^{1}
- Yale Romanization: Shŕjyājwāng
- IPA: [ʂɻ̩̌.tɕjá.ʈʂwáŋ]
Yue: Cantonese
- Yale Romanization: Sehkgājōng
- Jyutping: Sek^{6}-gaa^{1}-zong^{1}
- Hong Kong Romanisation: Shek Kar Jong
- IPA: [sɛk̚˨.ka˥.tsɔŋ˥]
Southern Min
- Hokkien POJ: Chio̍h-ka-chng
- Tâi-lô: Tsio̍h-ka-tsng

Shimen
- Simplified Chinese: 石门
- Traditional Chinese: 石門
- Literal meaning: "Shi family's village and Xiumen village Portfolio"
Transcriptions
Standard Mandarin
- Hanyu Pinyin: Shímén

Shijiazhuang (Note: /ˌʃiːdʒiəˈdʒwæŋ, ʃɜːr-/; simplified Chinese: 石家庄; traditional Chinese: 石家莊; pinyin: Shíjiāzhuāng; Mandarin: [ʂɻ̩̌.tɕjá.ʈʂwáŋ]; formerly known as Shimen and romanized as Shihkiachwang) is the capital and most populous city of China's Hebei Province, located 266 kilometres (165 mi) southwest of Beijing. It administers eight districts, three county-level cities and eleven counties, and is east of the Taihang Mountains, which extend over 400 km (250 mi) from north to south with an average elevation of 1,500 to 2,000 m (4,900 to 6,600 ft).

At the 2020 census, the city had a population of 11,235,086, with 6,230,709 in the built-up area comprising all urban districts except Jingxing District and Zhengding County, the twelfth largest in mainland China. By the end of 2025, the total resident population of the city will be 11,246,900.

Shijiazhuang experienced dramatic growth after the founding of the People's Republic of China in 1949. The population of the metropolitan area has more than quadrupled in thirty years as a result of industrialization and infrastructural developments. From 2008 to 2011, Shijiazhuang implemented a three-year plan, resulting in an increase of green areas and new buildings and roads. A railway station, airport and subway system have been opened.

== Name ==
The city's present name, Shijiazhuang (Chinese: 石家庄), first appeared during the Ming dynasty. Its literal meaning is "Shi family's village". The word Shijiazhuang was generally used after construction of the Shijiazhuang station of the Zhengtai Railway in 1907.

The origin of the name is heavily disputed. One story claimed that the Wanli Emperor sent 24 officers and their families to the area, after which the group split into two settlements consisting of 10 and 14 families. The imperial court then named the settlements "village of 10 families" (十家庄) and "village of 14 families" (十四家庄), respectively. Since the Chinese characters for ten (十; shí) and stone (石; shí) are homophones, it is speculated that the city name gradually evolved into its current spelling. Another explanation is that the settlement was named after the highest-ranking official amongst the groups, who was surnamed Shi. However, a county named Shiyi (Chinese: 石邑; lit. 'stone city'), in present-day Luquan District, was already present during the Warring States period, suggesting that the name, or its elements, have even older origins.

At first, the settlement was officially known only as "Shijia", as the "zhuang" was solely used to denote the nature of the settlement being a village, instead of being part of its name. This was further evidenced on June 24, 1925, when the Republican government ordered the village to be established as an autonomous city under the name Shijia. The city ended up being renamed as Shimen (石门) when it was officially incorporated on August 29, 1925, after the merger with another village, Xiumen (Chinese: 休门; lit. 'auspicious gate'). Despite being renamed, however, many documents and war plans from the Second Sino-Japanese War and the Chinese Civil War still referred to the city as "Shijiazhuang" or "Shizhuang". To avoid confusion and association with the Japanese Army, the Chinese Communist Party ultimately reverted the city's name back to Shijiazhuang on December 26, 1947. Since then, many terms regarding the city have been stemmed from the "zhuang" suffix, including its nickname "international village" (国际庄), and the colloquial demonym, "villagers" (庄里人). Jokingly, people also call it "Sky Home Town" or "Rocksville" from its Chinese translating into English.

== History ==
=== Pre-Qin period ===
This area was occupied by Xianyu people at beginning of Zhou dynasty; it later belonged to the Zhongshan (中山國) and Zhao states during the pre-Qin period.

=== Qin and Han dynasties ===
In pre-Han times (i.e., before 206 BC), the site of the city of Shiyi in the state of Zhao was located in this area. After taking over Zhao, Qin Shi Huang established the Hengshan Commandery in the region. It became part of the Zhao Principality under Western Han. The land was briefly granted to Liu Buyi (劉不疑), son of the Emperor Hui, during Empress Dowager Lü's reign. The territory was then passed to Liu Hong, Emperor Houshao of Han, after Buyi's death. It was then granted to Liu Chao (劉朝), another son of Emperor Hui. During the defeat of the Lü clan, Liu Chao was killed and the territory became a commandery of Zhao once again. Later, due to a naming taboo of Emperor Wen of Han, whose personal name is Liu Heng, its name was changed to Changshan (常山). From the Han (206 BC–AD 220) to Sui (581–618) periods, it was the site of a county seat named Shiyi.

=== Tang dynasty ===
With the reorganization of local government in the early period of the Tang dynasty (618–907), Hengshan county was abolished, and it was reestablished as a prefecture. It was renamed as Zhen Prefecture due to a naming taboo with Emperor Muzong of Tang, whose personal name was Li Heng.

=== Yuan and Song dynasties ===
Zhending was a giant city in the area, now Zhengding county, where was destination of migration from Yuan dynasty people and central area of preceding Northern Song dynasty people, particularly in Kaifeng and Zhengzhou etc. Marco Polo has glanced the city and noted it in his book.

=== Ming and Qing dynasties ===
The name "Shijiazhuang" was first mentioned in 1535 on a stele of a local temple. Shijiazhuang was then little more than a local market town, subordinated to the flourishing city of Zhengding a few miles to the north.

=== Republican era ===
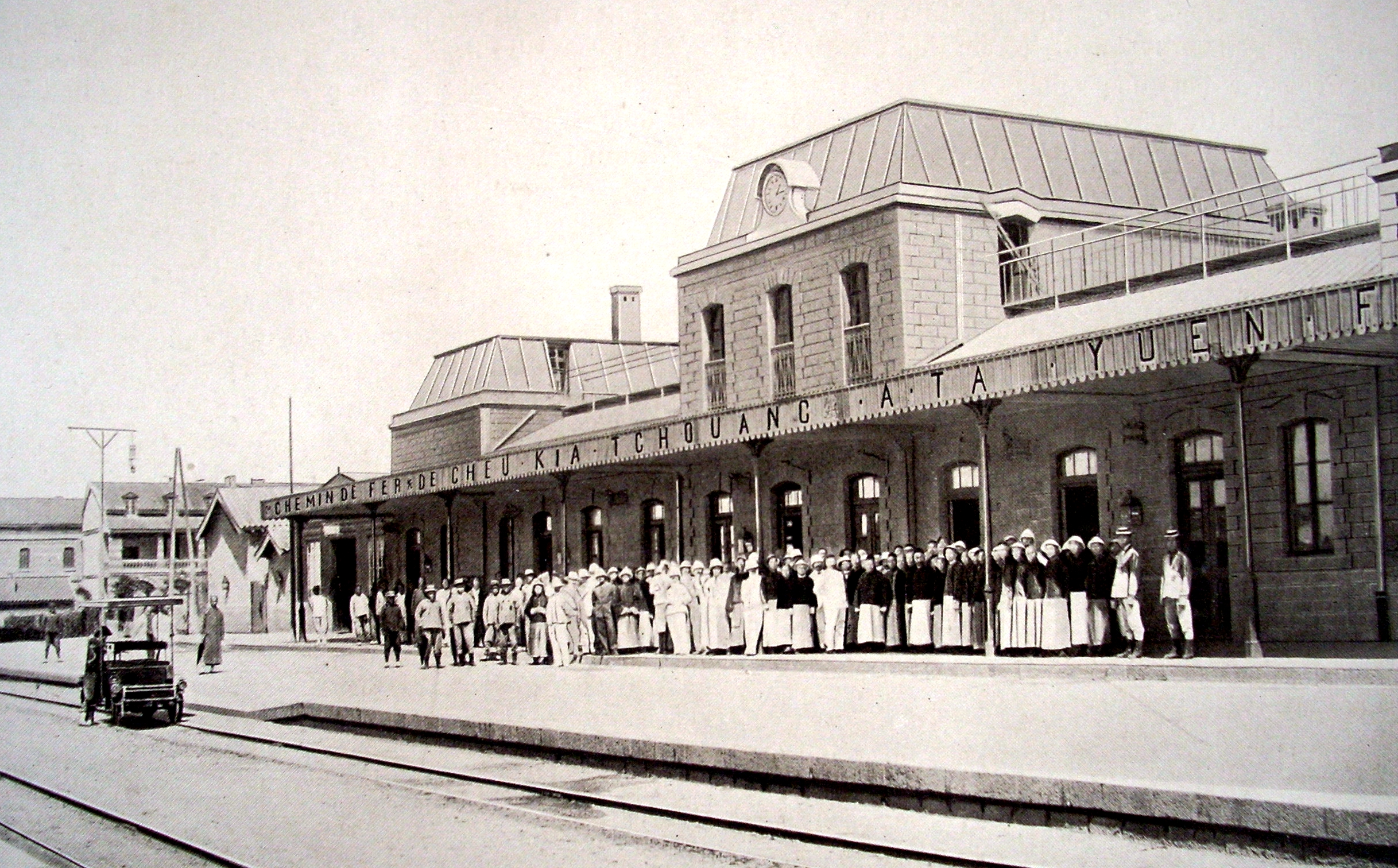
Old platform of Shijiazhuang in 1907

The growth of Shijiazhuang into one of China's major cities began in 1905, when the Beijing–Wuhan (Hankou) railway reached the area, stimulating trade and encouraging local farmers to grow cash crops. Two years later the town became the junction for the new Shitai line, running from Shijiazhuang to Taiyuan, Shanxi. The connection transformed the town from a local collecting center and market into a communications center of national importance on the main route from Beijing and Tianjin to Shanxi, and later, when the railway from Taiyuan was extended to the southwest, to Shaanxi as well. The city also became the center of an extensive road network.

Pre-World War II, Shijiazhuang was a large railway town as well as a commercial and collecting center for Shanxi and regions farther west and for agricultural produce of the North China Plain, particularly grain, tobacco, and cotton. By 1935, it had far outstripped Zhengding as an economic center. At the end of World War II the character of the city changed when it took on an administrative role as the preeminent city in western Hebei, and developed into an industrial city. Some industries, such as match manufacturing, tobacco processing, and glassmaking, had already been established before the war. By 1941, the Shide railway line was constructed between Shijiazhuang and Dezhou, Shandong in the war-occupied period, operated by North China Transportation Company.

On November 12, 1947, the city was captured by Communist forces. Xibaipo, a village about 90 km (56 mi) from downtown Shijiazhuang, in Pingshan County was the location of the Central Committee of the Chinese Communist Party and the headquarters of the People's Liberation Army during the decisive stages of the Chinese Civil War between May 26, 1948, and March 23, 1949, at which point they were moved to Beijing. Today, the area is a memorial site.

=== People's Republic ===
Since the city was pivotal to the People's Liberation Army's victory of the Chinese Civil War, many governmental agencies have roots in Shijiazhuang. The creation of the North China People's Government in 1947 affirmed the city's position as a key political center. A year later, as the result of the merger between the Bank of North China, the Bank of Beihai, and the Northwest Agricultural Bank, the People's Bank of China was established here, where it produced and released the first series of the renminbi.

Meanwhile, the industrialization of the city also gathered momentum thanks to government initiatives including the First Five-Year Plan. Shijiazhuang was one of the fourteen cities selected as focus cities for development. The population more than tripled in the decade 1948–58 after Communist won the civil war. In the 1950s, the city experienced a major expansion in the textile industry, with large-scale cotton spinning, weaving, printing, and dyeing works. In addition, there are plants processing local farm produce. In the 1960s it was the site of a new chemical industry, with plants producing fertilizer and caustic soda. Shijiazhuang also became an engineering base, with a tractor-accessory plant. There are important coal deposits at Jingxing and Huailu, now named Luquan, a few miles to the west in the foothills of the Taihang Mountains, which provide fuel for a thermal-generating plant supplying power to local industries.

Tianjin was again carved out of Hebei in 1967, remaining a separate entity today. The provincial capital was then moved to Baoding, however, the city was plunged into chaos due to the Cultural Revolution just a year later. Thus, under the direction of Mao Zedong to "prepare for war and natural disasters", Shijiazhuang became the provincial capital in 1968.

Beginning in the 1990s, Shijiazhuang saw another episode of rapid growth and development. Starting from the plains area in the east and south of the city, the focus of the developments later shifted towards the mountainous districts and counties in the west, as well as along the Hutuo River in the north.

In the early hours of March 16, 2001, four apartment buildings were leveled after a series of explosions rocked the city, killing 108 while injuring 38. The perpetrator was a deaf, unemployed man named Jin Ruchao who police arrested weeks later. Jin confessed that he had delivered the bombs via taxi and stated that the bombings were an act of revenge on his relatives, who were among the tenants of the apartments. Jin and his accomplices were later executed.

In December 2020, its mayor, Deng Peiran, was charged with corruption, with Ma Yujun currently serving as the acting mayor. A few weeks later, the city became a new COVID-19 hotspot; starting from the village of Xiaoguozhuang in Gaocheng District in the northern portion of the city, cases increased rapidly starting from January 2, 2021. Due to its proximity with Beijing and the severity of the outbreak, harsh measures were put into place, with all 11 million residences undergoing mandatory testing, as well as school closures, banning of gatherings, and residential districts being sealed. All highways were blocked off, with rail and air links also suspended.

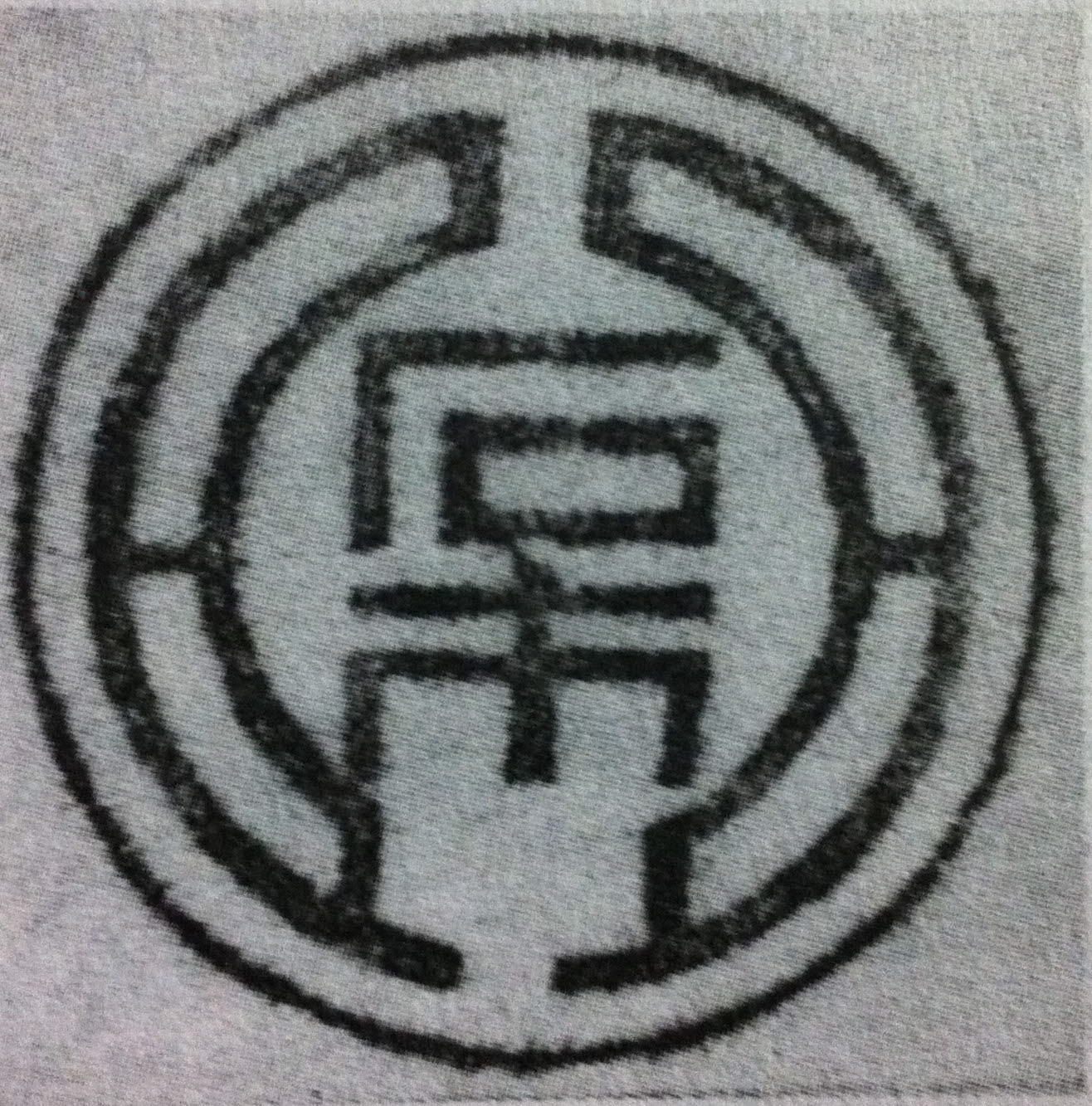
City seal during the Japanese occupation

Throughout the years, the city's administrative units have been shifted and adjusted multiple times. Initially, Shijiazhuang was administered under the prefecture of the same name, along with the counties of Zhengding, Pingshan, Lingshou, Jingxing, Jianping, Huailu, Jinxian, Gaocheng, Luancheng, Zhaoxian, Shulu, Yuanshi, Zanhuang, Gaoyi, and one town, Xinji. The first new district of the city, Jingxing Mining District, was created on June 27, 1950. On November 7, 1952, Hengshui Prefecture, to the east, was merged into Shijiazhuang, adding six more counties. The prefecture continued to expand after Dingxian Prefecture was split and merged into Baoding and Shijiazhuang on June 18, 1954. Between March 1960 and May 1961, the prefecture and the city merged. Thereafter, however, the prefecture was re-established, with Hengshui Prefecture splitting away the next year. The city and its prefecture merged for good in June 1993. In the 2010s, Shijiazhuang's administrative divisions saw further changes. In 2013, the county-level city of Xinji, although still part of Shijiazhuang prefecture, is now directly administered by Hebei province. Later, the State Council of the People's Republic of China approved more adjustments to the city's divisions. Qiaodong District was dissolved and merged into Chang'an and Qiaoxi districts. Three county-level cities, Gaocheng, Luquan, and Luancheng, became urban districts.

Taiping River Scenic Area

== Geography ==
Shijiazhuang is located in south-central Hebei, and is part of the Bohai Economic Rim. Its administrative area ranges in latitude from 37° 27' to 38° 47' N, and in longitude from 113° 30' to 115° 20' E. The prefecture-level city reaches a 148 kilometres (92 mi) north–south extent and a 175 kilometres (109 mi) width from east to west. The prefecture has borders stretching 760 kilometres (472 mi) long and covers an area of 15,722 square kilometres (6,070 sq mi). Bordering prefecture-level cities in Hebei are Hengshui (E), Xingtai (S), and Baoding (N/NE). To the west lies the province of Shanxi.

The city stands at the edge of the North China Plain, which rises to the Taihang Mountains to the west of the city, and lies south of the Hutuo River. From west to east, the topography can be summarised as moderately high mountains, then low-lying mountains, hills, basin, and finally plains. Out of the eight east–west routes across the Taihang Mountains, the fifth, the Niangzi Pass, connects the city directly with Taiyuan, Shanxi.

The mountainous part of the prefecture consists of parts of:

- Jingxing Mining District
- Jingxing County
- Zanhuang County
- Xingtang County
- Lingshou County
- Yuanshi County
- Luquan District

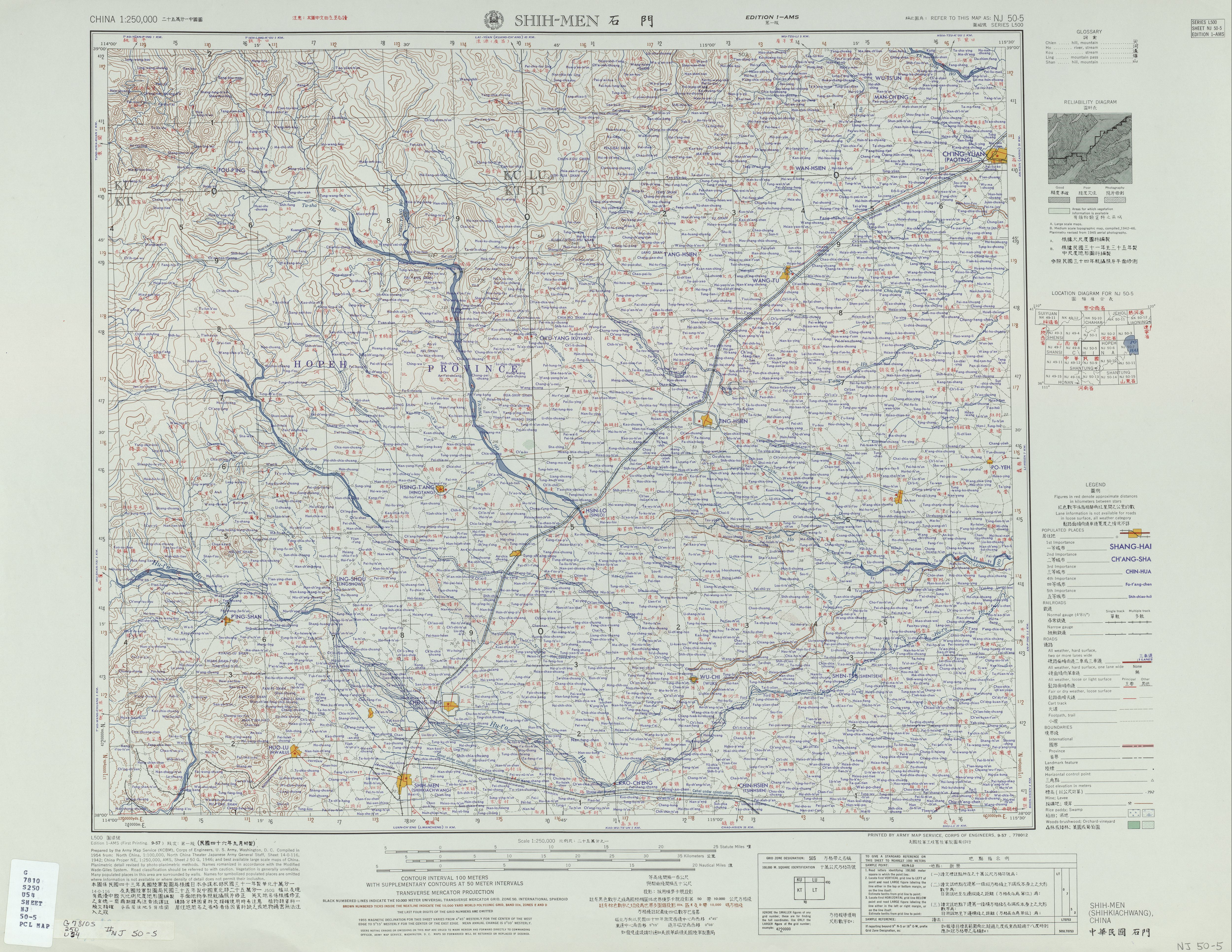
Map including Shijiazhuang (labeled as SHIH-MEN (SHIHKIACHWANG) 石門) (AMS, 1954)

The Hutuo River Basin in the east juts into:

- Xinle City
- Wuji County
- Shenze County
- Jinzhou City
- Gaocheng District
- Gaoyi County
- Zhao County
- Luancheng District
- Zhengding County
- The metropolitan area and its suburbs, in their entirety
- All of the divisions mentioned in the above list, except for Jingxing Mining District

=== Climate ===
The city has a continental, monsoon-influenced semi-arid climate (Köppen BSk / Dwa), characterised by hot, humid summers due to the East Asian monsoon, and generally cold, windy, very dry winters that reflect the influence of the Siberian anticyclone. Spring can see sandstorms blowing in from the Mongolian steppe, accompanied by rapidly warming, but generally dry, conditions. Autumn is similar to spring in temperature and lack of rainfall. January averages −1.4 °C (29.5 °F), while July averages 27.7 °C (81.9 °F); the annual mean is 14.3 °C (57.7 °F). With the monthly percent possible sunshine ranging from 38 percent in July to 56 percent in May, the city receives 2,163 hours of sunshine annually. More than half of the annual rainfall occurs in July and August alone. Extremes since 1951 have ranged from −26.5 °C (−15.7 °F) on January 12, 1951 to 42.9 °C (109.2 °F) on July 15, 2002.

Climate data for Shijiazhuang, elevation 89 m (292 ft), (1991–2020 normals, extremes 1951–present)
Month	Jan	Feb	Mar	Apr	May	Jun	Jul	Aug	Sep	Oct	Nov	Dec	Year
Record high °C (°F)	18.0 (64.4)	25.8 (78.4)	30.7 (87.3)	35.0 (95.0)	42.8 (109.0)	42.7 (108.9)	42.9 (109.2)	38.6 (101.5)	39.7 (103.5)	34.1 (93.4)	26.8 (80.2)	25.5 (77.9)	42.9 (109.2)
Mean daily maximum °C (°F)	3.6 (38.5)	7.8 (46.0)	14.8 (58.6)	21.9 (71.4)	27.7 (81.9)	32.2 (90.0)	32.5 (90.5)	30.7 (87.3)	27.0 (80.6)	20.6 (69.1)	11.7 (53.1)	5.1 (41.2)	19.6 (67.4)
Daily mean °C (°F)	−1.4 (29.5)	2.3 (36.1)	9.0 (48.2)	16.0 (60.8)	22.1 (71.8)	26.4 (79.5)	27.7 (81.9)	26.2 (79.2)	21.6 (70.9)	14.9 (58.8)	6.5 (43.7)	0.4 (32.7)	14.3 (57.8)
Mean daily minimum °C (°F)	−5.2 (22.6)	−2.0 (28.4)	4.0 (39.2)	10.5 (50.9)	16.5 (61.7)	21.1 (70.0)	23.5 (74.3)	22.4 (72.3)	17.4 (63.3)	10.4 (50.7)	2.4 (36.3)	−3.1 (26.4)	9.8 (49.7)
Record low °C (°F)	−26.5 (−15.7)	−19.8 (−3.6)	−17.3 (0.9)	−5.3 (22.5)	3.8 (38.8)	10.6 (51.1)	16.2 (61.2)	11.1 (52.0)	3.7 (38.7)	−2.4 (27.7)	−14.1 (6.6)	−18.7 (−1.7)	−26.5 (−15.7)
Average precipitation mm (inches)	3.8 (0.15)	6.0 (0.24)	10.3 (0.41)	25.5 (1.00)	37.3 (1.47)	58.4 (2.30)	141.4 (5.57)	139.4 (5.49)	59.0 (2.32)	28.4 (1.12)	16.8 (0.66)	4.2 (0.17)	530.5 (20.9)
Average precipitation days (≥ 0.1 mm)	1.9	2.6	2.8	5.1	5.8	8.5	11.8	11.1	7.0	5.5	3.7	2.3	68.1
Average snowy days	3.2	2.7	1.3	0.2	0	0	0	0	0	0	1.6	2.6	11.6
Average relative humidity (%)	53	49	45	50	53	56	70	73	67	63	61	56	58
Mean monthly sunshine hours	136.1	152.4	194.8	222.7	246.7	209.1	169.6	180.9	183.5	176.3	151.9	138.8	2,162.8
Percentage possible sunshine	44	50	52	56	56	47	38	43	50	51	51	47	49
Source: China Meteorological Administration all-time extreme temperature

=== Air quality ===
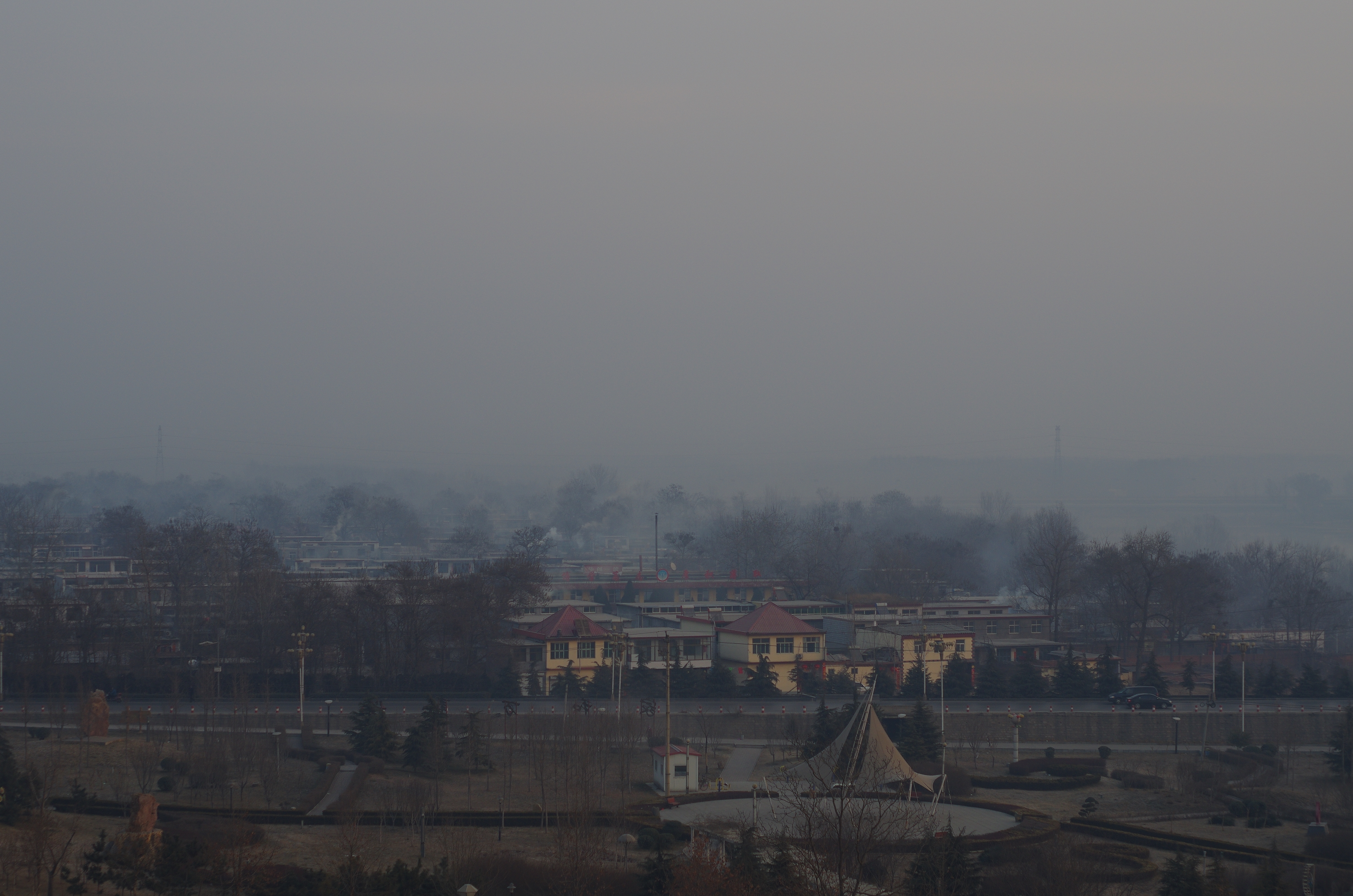
A park in Shijiazhuang during a smoggy day

Shijiazhuang has had a reputation for much-polluted air as part of the Beijing-Tianjin-Hebei region, driven by large industries with high levels of energy consumption. In January 2013, analysis released by Tsinghua University and The Asian Development Bank foundin that the city was one of ten most air-polluted cities in the world. Hebei province as a whole has been one of the worst afflicted regions for air pollution in China, and a survey by "Global voices China" in February 2013 showed that the province had seven of the ten cities with the worst air pollution in China, of which one was Shijiazhuang.

In December 2013 Shijiazhuang was blanketed in a dense wave of smog that covered much of the Central and Eastern part of China, across a distance of around 1,200 kilometres (750 mi). A lack of cold air flow, combined with slow-moving air masses carrying industrial emissions, collected airborne pollutants to form a thick layer of smog over the region. Officials blamed the dense pollution on lack of wind, automobile exhaust emissions under low air pressure, and coal-powered district heating system in Northern China . Prevailing winds blew low-hanging air masses of factory emissions (mostly SO_{2}) towards China's east coast.

Air pollution in the city peaked in 2014, when annual average PM2.5 Air Pollution reached 94 μg/m^{3}, almost 19 times the World Health Organization guideline level. The national air pollution action plan issued by the State Council in 2013 highlighted the wider Beijing-Tianjin-Hebei region as a focus area for improvement, which gained momentum in the government's "War on pollution". Although air pollution in the city remained well above the guideline level (approx. 8.5 times higher), by 2023 PM2.5 levels in the city had fallen significantly from their peak, with an annual average of 42 μg/m^{3} representing a 54.8% reduction from the 2014 record level.

== Current leaders ==
Leaders of the Chinese Communist Party and state institutions in Shijiazhuang
Departments	Danghui Secretary of the Shijiazhuang Municipal Committee of the Chinese Communist Party	Director of the Standing Committee of the Shijiazhuang People's Congress	Mayor of Shijiazhuang People's Government	Emblem of the Chinese People's Political Consultative Conference (CPPCC) logo Chairman of Shijiazhuang Municipal Committee of the Chinese People's Political Consultative Conference
Name	Zhang Chaochao	Li Xuerong	Ma Yujun	Zhang Ye
Ethnic Group	Han	Han	Manchu	Han
Native place	Shangcai County, Henan	Zhangjiakou, Hebei	Luanping County, Hebei	Xinji, Hebei
Birth date	December 1967 (age 58)	June 1963 (age 63)	June 1965 (age 61)	August 1963 (age 63)
Date of assumption of duty	April 2021	February 2021	January 2021	February 2021

== Administrative divisions ==
Shijiazhuang has direct administrative jurisdiction over:

Map
Name	Chinese	Pinyin	Population (2010)	Area (km^{2})	Density (/km^{2})
City proper
Chang'an District	长安区	Cháng'ān Qū	560,643	110	4,362
Qiaoxi District	桥西区	Qiáoxī Qū	596,164	53	11,248
Xinhua District	新华区	Xīnhuá Qū	625,119	92	6,795
Yuhua District	裕华区	Yùhuá Qū	574,572	101	4,888
Luancheng District	栾城区	Luánchéng Qū	328,933	347	948
Gaocheng District	藁城区	Gàochéng Qū	775,110	836	927
Luquan District	鹿泉区	Lùquán Qū	432,936	603	718
Suburban
Jingxing Mining District	井陉矿区	Jǐngxíng Kuàngqū	95,170	56	1,699
Zhengding County	正定县	Zhèngdìng Xiàn	466,807	568	822
Satellite cities
Xinji City	辛集市	Xīnjí Shì	615,919	951	648
Jinzhou City	晋州市	Jìnzhōu Shì	537,679	619	868
Xinle City	新乐市	Xīnlè Shì	487,652	625	780
Rural
Jingxing County	井陉县	Jǐngxíng Xiàn	309,882	1,381	224
Xingtang County	行唐县	Xíngtáng Xiàn	406,353	1,025	396
Lingshou County	灵寿县	Língshòu Xiàn	333,558	1,546	216
Gaoyi County	高邑县	Gāoyì Xiàn	186,478	222	840
Shenze County	深泽县	Shēnzé Xiàn	250,264	296	845
Zanhuang County	赞皇县	Zànhuáng Xiàn	244,799	1,210	202
Wuji County	无极县	Wújí Xiàn	502,662	524	959
Pingshan County	平山县	Píngshān Xiàn	433,429	2,951	147
Yuanshi County	元氏县	Yuánshì Xiàn	418,466	849	493
Zhao County	赵县	Zhào Xiàn	571,077	714	800

== Demographics ==
Busy intersection at Xianbei Square

Migrants flowing in from all across China largely contributed to the population growth of Shijiazhuang in recent times. With a population of 120,000 in 1947, Shijiazhuang became the first medium-large city captured by the Chinese Communist Party from the Kuomintang. By the time of the People's Republic of China's founding in 1949, the total urban population increased to more than 270,000 people, more than doubling in a span of two years. In 1953, when China rolled out its first five-year plan, the total population of Shijiazhuang's urban area increased to 320,000. In 1960, the total population of the Shijiazhuang urban area had reached 650,000. In 1968, the city experienced a substantial increase due to it being designated the capital of Hebei to avoid chaos in Baoding amidst the Cultural Revolution. By 1980, the urban population had surpassed the one million mark, joining the ranks of a large city. As of the end of 2017, the urban population of Shijiazhuang exceeded 4.5 million.

In just six decades, the city's population has increased by more than 20 fold. At the end of 2009, the city's total non-migrant population was 9,774,100, an increase of 109,300 over the previous year. The birth rate of the city's population is 14.65%, the death rate is 6.25%, and the natural growth rate is 8.4%.

According to the sixth national census in 2010, the city's total non-migrant population stands at 10,163,788. Compared with the fifth national census a decade prior, there was an increase of 818,365 people, or an increase of 8.76%, and an average annual growth rate of 0.84%. Among them, the male population stood at 5,087,913, accounting for 50.06% of the total population; the female population is 5,075,875, accounting for 49.94% of the total population. The gender ratio of the total population is 100 women per 100.24 men. The population aged between 0 and 14 is 1,548,125, accounting for 15.23% of the total population; the population aged between 15 and 64 is 7,789,753, accounting for 76.64% of the total population; the population aged 65 and over is 825,910, accounting for 8.13% of the total population.

The top 10 surnames of Shijiazhuang are: Zhang (10.27%), Wang (9.25%), Li (9.17%), Liu (6.73%), Zhao (4.28%), Yang (2.82%), Gao (2.08%), Chen (1.92%), Ma (1.77%), and Guo (1.55%).

On May 6, 2011, the Chinese Academy of Social Sciences published the "2011 China Urban Competitiveness Blue Book: China Urban Competitiveness Report". In it, the happiness survey sampled 294 cities across China, arriving at the conclusion that the residents of Shijiazhuang were the happiest. This result caused strong doubts from netizens.

== Economy ==
Financial Street

In 2014, the GDP of Shijiazhuang reached CN¥510.02 billion (about $80.45 billion in USD), an increase of 12 percent over the previous year, and placing the city 20th in provincial capitals by GDP.

Shijiazhuang has become a major industrial city in North China and is considered to be the economic center of Hebei province, along with Tangshan. The city also located in Beijing-Tianjin-Shijiazhuang Hi-Tech Industrial Belt, which is one of the main Hi-Tech Belts in China. Nicknamed the "medicine hub of China", it is home to major pharmaceutical companies and factories like the North China Pharmaceutical Group Corporation, Shijiazhuang Pharma Group, and Shineway Pharma. The textile industry is also one of the backbones of the city's commerce. Other sectors include machinery and chemicals such as Shijiazhuang Donghua Jinlong, building materials, light industry, and electronics. With abundant agricultural resources, Shijiazhuang has 590,000 hectares of cultivated land and is the main source of cotton, pears, dates and walnuts in Hebei province.

In 2008, total imports reached US$1.393 billion, an increase of 42.1 percent over the previous year. Exports increased by 34.9 percent to US$5.596 billion.

2006 World Bank reported that Shijiazhuang was spending less than RMB400 per capita on education, as opposed to Beijing (RMB1,044) and Weihai (RMB1,631).

=== Development zones ===
- Shijiazhuang High-Tech Industrial Development Zone

The zone was established in March 1991 as a state-level development zone and is divided into three districts. National highways 107, 207, 307, 308 pass through the zone. It is 15 km (9.3 mi) away from Shijiazhuang railway station, 105 km (65 mi) away from Tianjin Port. Industries include pharmaceuticals, electronic information, mechanical production, automobile manufacturing, chemicals production and logistics.

The Eastern District, located in the eastern part of Shijiazhuang, covers an area of 5.8 km^{2} (2.2 sq mi), and serves as the primary section of the New High-tech Industrial Development Zone. The district focuses on the establishment of new high-tech enterprises. There are plans to expand the district into an area of 9.8 km^{2} (3.8 sq mi). A railway line operated by Shijiazhuang Oil Refinery runs through the zone from north to south, so enterprises in the zone can build lines of their own.

The Western District, located in the southwest of Shijiazhuang, covers an area of 8.2 km^{2} (3.2 sq mi). It focuses on small- and medium-sized technology enterprises and technology incubation. Liangcun District, which borders the Western District, covers 4 km^{2} (1.5 sq mi), and focuses on the pharmaceutical industry and the petrochemical industry.

By 2009, some 2,600 enterprises had settled in the zone, of which 185 were foreign-funded enterprises. Firms from Japan, the US, the Republic of Korea, Germany, Italy, Canada, Malaysia, Hong Kong, Macao and Taiwan had established themselves in the zone.

=== Dairy ===
The city is a center for the dairy trade, being the headquarters of the Sanlu Group. Sanlu became Shijiazhuang's largest taxpayer since it had become the largest formula seller in China for a continuous 15-year period. Richard McGregor, author of The Party: The Secret World of China's Communist Rulers, said that Sanlu became "an invaluable asset for a city otherwise struggling to attract industry and investment on a par with China's premier metropolises."

Both the dairy trade and Sanlu were affected by the 2008 Chinese milk scandal. The chairman and general manager of Sanlu, and several party officials, including the vice-mayor in charge of food and agriculture, Zhang Fawang, were reportedly removed from office. Mayor Ji Chuntang reportedly resigned on September 17, 2008.

== Transportation ==
Bus in Chang'an District

=== Expressways ===
The city is served by many expressways, including the Shitai, Beijing–Shenzhen and Taiyuan–Cangzhou Expressways.

=== Railway ===
The departures hall of Shijiazhuang railway station.

Shijiazhuang is a transportation hub at the intersection point of the Beijing–Guangzhou, Taiyuan–Dezhou, and Shuozhou–Huanghua railways. The new Shijiazhuang railway station (opened December 2012) has a rare distinction of being served by both the "conventional" Beijing–Guangzhou Railway and the new Beijing–Guangzhou–Shenzhen–Hong Kong High-Speed Railway. Such an arrangement is fairly uncommon on China's high-speed rail network, as typically high-speed lines are constructed to bypass city cores, where the older "conventional" train stations are.

In Shijiazhuang's case, to make it possible to bring the new high-speed railway into the central city, a 5 km (3.1 mi) long railway tunnel was constructed under the city. This is the first time a high-speed railway has been run under a Chinese city.

There is also the smaller Shijiazhuang North railway station, used by trains going west toward Taiyuan without the need for passing through downtown.

=== Metro ===
Line 1, Line 2 and Line 3 of the Shijiazhuang Metro are currently operational. The system is 76.5 km (47.5 mi) in length. The latest metro plan of Shijiazhuang includes 6 lines in total.

=== Airport ===
The Shijiazhuang Zhengding International Airport is the province's center of air transportation. It is about 30 kilometers northeast of the city. There are 32 domestic routes arriving at and departing from Shijiazhuang, including destinations such as Shanghai, Shenzhen and Dalian. The airport serves 12 international destinations including four routes to Russia. The airport is being expanded and will be capable of being an alternate airport to Beijing Capital International Airport.

With the opening of the Beijing–Guangzhou High-Speed Railway at the end of 2012, the airport got its own train station, making available fast, although infrequent, train service between the airport and Shijiazhuang railway station, as well as other stations in the region.

=== Cycling ===
Most large roads in the city feature a separate cycle lane and, combined with the city being flat, make it ideal for cycling. Thousands of cyclists use the city each day and often there are more cyclists waiting at a crossroad than cars.

== Military ==
Shijiazhuang is the headquarters of the 27th Group Army of the People's Liberation Army, one of the three group armies that comprise the Beijing Military Region responsible for defending China's capital.

== Culture ==
=== City centre ===
Hebei Museum

The city of Shijiazhuang is similar to Beijing in that all roads run from north to south and east to west, making the city easy to navigate. Many roads have cycle paths, making it cyclist-friendly. In the heart of the city is the Hebei Museum, which was refurbished in 2013 and 2014. It holds regular events, mostly showing traditional Chinese art and artifacts. The Yutong International Sports Centre hosts the Shijiazhuang Ever Bright football matches as well as holding pop concerts.

Shijiazhuang Zoo is located on the west side of the city. The zoo has 3,000 animals of 250 species, including flamingos, golden monkeys, Manchurian tigers, Indian elephants, giraffes, chimpanzees, kangaroos, seals, white tigers, springboks, and pandas. Near the Shijiazhuang Zoo are the Botanical Gardens (Chinese: 石家庄植物园), offering a range of exotic and native plants both to view and purchase. The Martyrs Memorial (烈士纪念馆) can be found in the centre of the city, commemorating the soldiers lost in war.

Mount Cagyan

=== Main sights ===
Baodu Zhai (Chinese: 抱犊寨; pinyin: Bàodúzhài), or Baodu Village, is an ancient fortified hilltop settlement located on the west side of the city, the mountain contains walks and buddhist statues. Close to Baodu Zhai is Fenglong Mountain (封龙山) is situated 5 km (3.1 mi) outside of Shijiazhuang to the west, the mountain features walks and a large stone Buddha statue situated on top of the mountain. Mount Cangyan (苍岩山; Cāngyán Shān; 'Green Cliff Mountain') is a scenic area in Jingxing County, famous for its combination of natural mountain scenery with historical man-made structures. It was featured in a scene of the Chinese movie Crouching Tiger, Hidden Dragon.

The Longxing Temple (Chinese: 隆興寺; pinyin: Lóngxīng Sì) is an ancient Buddhist monastery located just outside the city. It has been referred to as the "First Temple south of Beijing". The Anji Bridge (also known as Zhaozhou Bridge) (安濟橋; Ānjì Qiáo; 'Safe crossing bridge') is the world's oldest open-spandrel stone segmental arch bridge. Credited to the design of a craftsman named Li Chun, the bridge was constructed in the years 595–605 during the Sui dynasty (581–618). It is the oldest standing bridge in China. The Pagoda of Bailin Temple (從諗禪師舍利塔; Cóngshěn Chánshī Shělìtǎ or 趙州塔; Zhàozhōu Tǎ) is an octagonal-based brick Chinese pagoda built in 1330 during the reign of Emperor Wenzong, ruler of the Mongol-led Yuan dynasty (1271–1368).

Chang'an Park

=== City parks ===
The downtown area of the city contains a range of parks. The largest park is found in the centre of the city, known as Chang'an Park (Chinese: 长安公园). The park includes an underground shopping mall, a theatre, a museum, a lake, bars and restaurants. Another park is found on the southeast side of the city: Century Park (世纪公园), Century Park contains a lake in the centre with an amusement park to the north side. On the northwest side of the city is Water Park (水上公园) which features a large lake, amusement rides, short walks and various restaurants. As well as these three large parks, there are smaller parks scattered across the city.

=== Shopping ===
The largest mall in the city is the Wanda shopping mall, located on the southeast side of the city, along with the Lerthai Shopping Complex at the downtown, and Wondermall on the southwest side. The Wanda mall includes an IMAX theatre.

Shopping on Zhuangli Street

=== Food ===
During the summer barbecue restaurants (Chinese: 烧烤) open, selling a whole range of foods, the most popular of which are lamb kebabs (羊肉串). Thousands of restaurants can be found across the city offering a range of Chinese as well as western cuisine open around the clock.

=== Cultural references ===
The 2018 arthouse film An Elephant Sitting Still by Hu Bo was shot and set in Shijiazhuang.

=== Notable people ===
- Li Deyu, a Chinese poet, politician, and writer of Tang dynasty.
- Zhou Dongyu, actress considered one of the Four Dan actresses of the post 90's generation.
- Kang Hui, news anchor for China Central Television.
- Li Jiang, an official of Tang dynasty, serving as a chancellor during the reign of Emperor Xianzong.
- Deng Lun, actor.
- Omnipotent Youth Society, Chinese alternative rock band that was formed in the late 1990s.
- Han Shantong, one of leaders of the early Red Turban rebellion.
- Zhao Tuo, Qin dynasty Chinese general. Founder of Triệu dynasty.
- Linji Yixuan, the founder of Linji school since Tang dynasty.
- Han Xu, WNBA center for the New York Liberty.
- Sun Yingsha, table tennis player.
- Zheng Yuanjie, Chinese fairy tale author, and founder and sole writer of a children's literature magazine known as the King of Fairy Tales.
- Zhao Yun, military general who lived during the late Han dynasty and early Three Kingdoms period.

== Sports ==
Shijiazhuang Gongfu F.C. (Chinese: 石家庄功夫; pinyin: Shíjiāzhuāng Gōngfu) is a Chinese football club based in Shijiazhuang, Hebei, which competes in the China League One. It plays in the 37,000-seat Yutong International Sports Center (裕彤国际体育中心), a multi-use stadium mostly used for football matches. The capacity is 38,500.

Hebei Olympic Sports Center Stadium is another multi-purpose stadium located in the Zhengding New District. It seats 60.000, and was formerly used by Shijiazhuang Yongchang F.C. between 2019-2020.

Fumei Shijiazhuang FC is a Chinese futsal club, which competes in Futsal Premier league. Current coach is Dejan Dedovic

== Hospitals ==
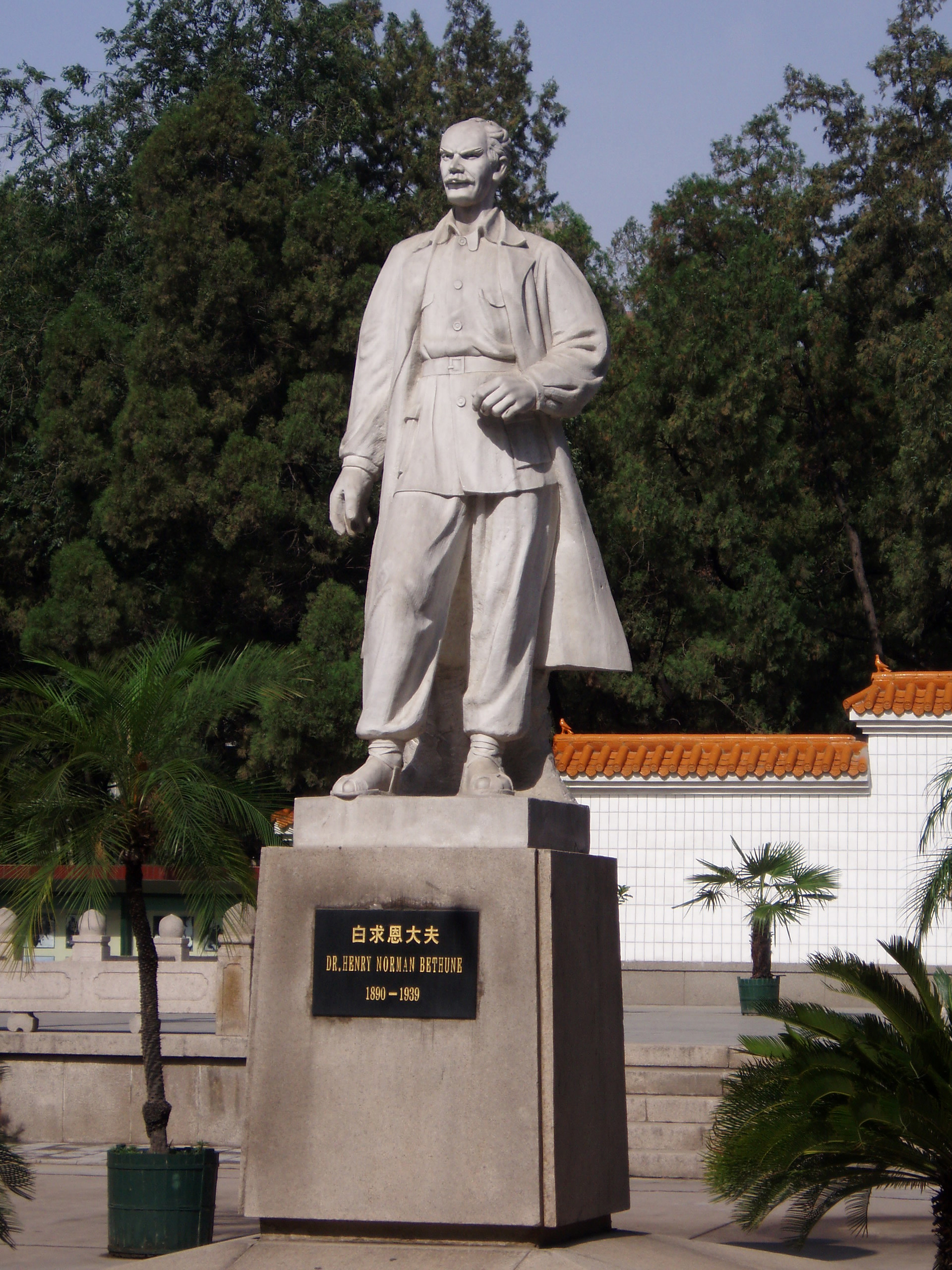
Norman Bethune

- Hebei General Hospital
- The First Hospital of Shijiazhuang City
- The Third Hospital of Hebei Medical University
- Bethune International Peace Hospital Chinese: 白求恩国际和平医院; pinyin: Báiqiú'ēn'Hépíng'Yīyuàn, namesake after Norman Bethune a Canadian thoracic surgeon who is honored for his humanitarian service in bringing modern medicine to rural China.

== Education ==
=== Universities and colleges ===
- Shijiazhuang University
- Hebei GEO University
- Shijiazhuang Tiedao University
- Hebei Normal University
- Hebei Medical University

== Twin towns and sister cities ==
Shijiazhuang's twin towns and sister cities are:

Nagano, Nagano Prefecture, Japan (April 19, 1981)
Saskatoon, Saskatchewan, Canada (May 31, 1985)
Des Moines, Iowa, United States (August 8, 1986)
Edison, New Jersey, United States (Date unknown)
Parma, Emilia-Romagna, Italy (September 22, 1987)
Corby, England, United Kingdom (October 5, 1994)
Ayagawa, Kagawa Prefecture, Japan (May 23, 1995)
Solofra, Avellino, Italy (August 17, 1997)
Cheonan, South Chungcheong, South Korea (August 26, 1997)
Querétaro City, Querétaro, Mexico (September 2, 1997)
Khmelnytskyi, Ukraine (1998)
Richmond Hill, Ontario, Canada (July 9, 1998)
Falkenberg, Halland County, Sweden (August 6, 2002)
Nam Định, Nam Định Province, Vietnam (December 27, 2004)
Nagykanizsa, Zala County, Hungary (2007)

== See also ==
- Yanzhao Evening News
- Chinese destroyer Shijiazhuang
- Shijiazhuang Art Museum
