= Chang'an, Shijiazhuang =

Chang'an 长安区
- District
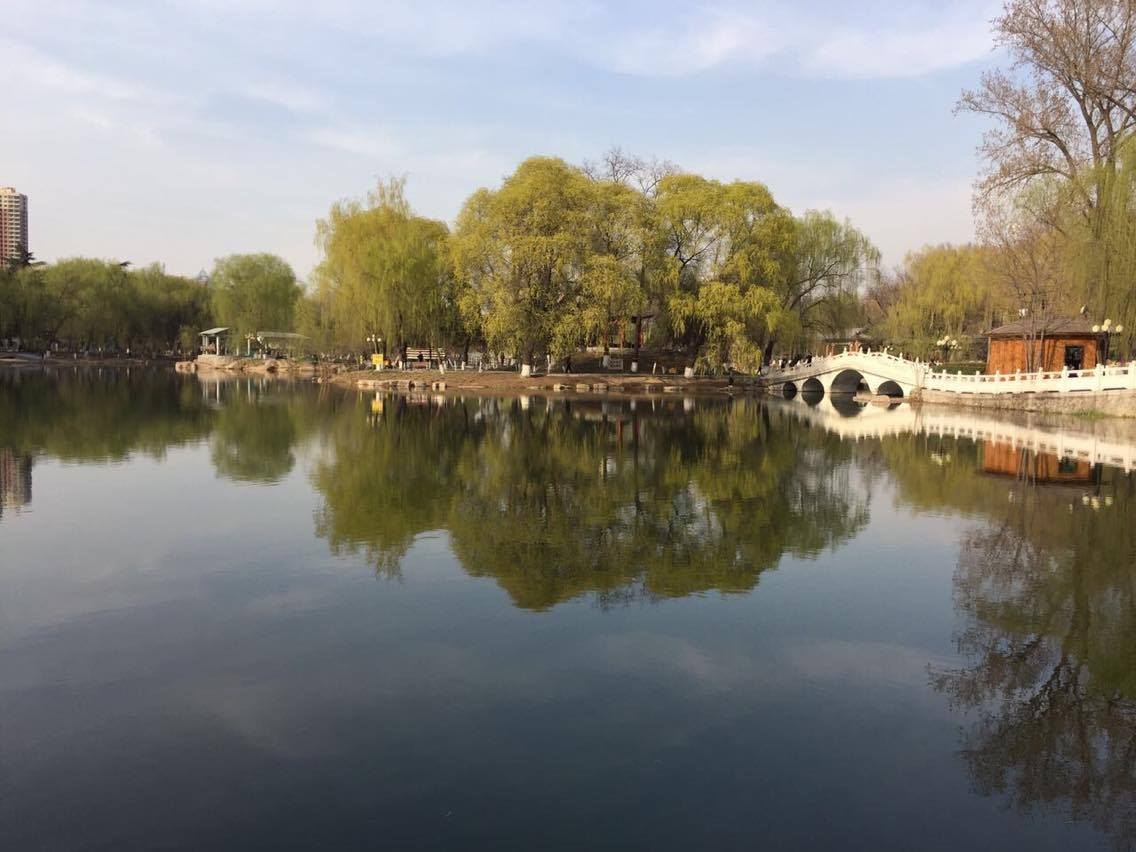
- Chang'an Park
- Interactive map of Chang'an
- Location in Hebei/Shijiazhuang Chang'an (Shijiazhuang)
- Coordinates (Chang'an District government): 38°02′12″N 114°32′21″E
- Country: China
- Province: Hebei
- Prefecture-level city: Shijiazhuang
- District seat: Yucai Subdistrict

Area
  - Total: 140.14 km^{2} (54.11 sq mi)

Population (2020 census)
  - Total: 1,059,572
  - Density: 7,560.8/km^{2} (19,582/sq mi)
- Time zone: UTC+8 (China Standard)
- Website: www.sjzca.gov.cn

Chang'an District (simplified Chinese: 长安区; traditional Chinese: 長安區; pinyin: Cháng'ān Qū; lit. 'Perpetual Peace') is one of eight districts of the prefecture-level city of Shijiazhuang, the capital of Hebei Province, North China, located in the northeast of the urban core of the city. The area is 110.24 km^{2} (42.56 sq mi). There are 426,500 residents, among which 109,700 residents are farmers. The leading pharmaceutical manufacturer in China, North China Pharmaceutical Group Corp (NCPC) located in Chang'an District, Shijiazhuang.

Hebei Airlines has its corporate headquarters in the Shijiazhuang World Trade Plaza Hotel (石家庄世贸广场酒店; 石家莊世貿廣場酒店; Shíjiāzhuāng Shìmào Guǎngchǎng Jiǔdiàn) in Chang'an District.

== Administrative divisions ==
There are 12 subdistricts and 4 towns in the district.

12 subdistricts are: Jianbei Subdistrict (建北街道), Qingyuan Subdistrict (青园街道), Guang'an Subdistrict (广安街道), Yucai Subdistrict (育才街道), Yuejin Subdistrict (跃进街道), Hedong Subdistrict (河东街道), Changfeng Subdistrict (长丰街道), Tangu Subdistrict (谈固街道), East Zhongshan Road Subdistrict (中山东路街道), Fukang Subdistrict (阜康街道), Jian'an Subdistrict (建安街道), Shengbei Subdistrict (胜北街道).

4 towns are: Xizhaotong (西兆通镇), Nancun (南村镇), Gaoying (高营镇), Taoyuan (桃园镇).
