= Yucai =

Yucai (育才) may refer to:

- Duan Yucai (段玉裁; 1735–1815), Chinese philologist

== Places ==
- Yucai, Hainan, town in Sanya
- Yucai Subdistrict, Shijiazhuang, in Chang'an District, Shijiazhuang, Hebei
- Yucai Subdistrict, Hegang, in Gongnong District, Hegang, Heilongjiang
- Yucai Road Subdistrict, Shizuishan, in Huinong District, Shizuishan, Ningxia
- Yucai Road Subdistrict, Suining, in Chuanshan District, Suining, Sichuan

== Schools ==
- Yucai School (disambiguation)
