= Changfeng =

Changfeng may refer to:

- Changfeng Automobile (长丰), automobile company of mainland China
- Changfeng (missile) (长风), developed by the People's Republic of China

== Locations in China ==
- Changfeng, Renqiu (长丰镇), in Hebei
- Changfeng, Hainan (长丰镇), in Wanning City
- Changfeng County (长丰县), Hefei, Anhui
- Changfeng Park (长风公园), in Shanghai
- Changfeng Subdistrict, Shijiazhuang (长丰街道), in Chang'an District, Shijiazhuang, Hebei
- Changfeng Subdistrict, Qiaokou District (长丰街道), Wuhan, Hubei
- Changfeng Township, Anhui (长风乡), in Yingjiang District, Anqing
- Changfeng Township, Guizhou (长丰乡), in Dejiang County
- Changfeng Township, Jiangxi (长丰乡), in Luxi County

== See also ==
- Chang Feng (born 1923), Taiwanese actor
- Chang Feng-class destroyer, a class of destroyers built for the Imperial Chinese Navy
