= Mo Prefecture =

Historical administrative division in Hebei, China

Mozhou or Mo Prefecture (莫州) was a zhou (prefecture) in imperial China centering on modern Renqiu, Hebei, China. It existed (intermittently) from 725 until 1374.

It was one of the Sixteen Prefectures ceded to the Liao dynasty by Later Jin in 938, but in 959, Later Zhou's army conquered the prefecture from Liao.

The prefecture was abolished by the Jin dynasty in 1214, but reinstated by the Mongol Empire which conquered Jin in 1234. Mo Prefecture was abolished for good at the beginning of the Ming dynasty in 1374.

== Geography ==
The administrative region of Mo Prefecture in the Tang dynasty is under the administration of modern central Hebei. It probably includes parts of modern:

- Under the administration of Cangzhou:
  - Renqiu
- Under the administration of Langfang:
  - Wen'an County
- Under the administration of Baoding:
  - Baoding
  - Anxin County
