= Kaiyuan Finance Center =

Building in Hebei, China

- 开元金融中心
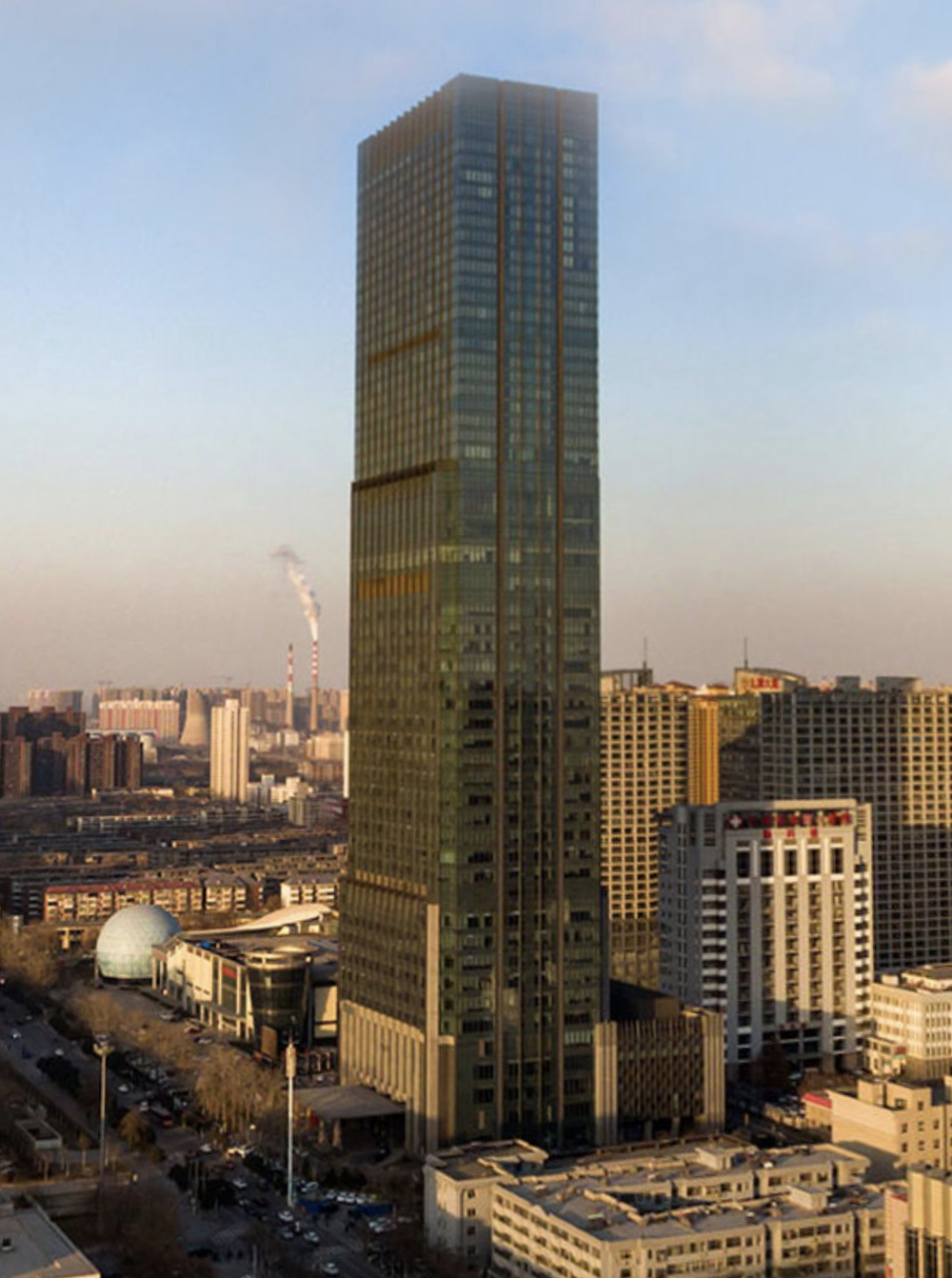
- Kaiyuan Finance Center in June 2019

- Location in Hebei/Shijiazhuang Kaiyuan Finance Center (Shijiazhuang)
- Alternative names: Kaiyuan World Center

General information
- Status: Completed
- Architectural style: Modern
- Location: 10 Fangbei Road, Chang'an District, Shijiazhuang, Hebei, China
- Coordinates: 38°02′24″N 114°31′29.8″E
- Construction started: 2008
- Completed: 2012
- Operator: Fincera Inc., Hilton Shijiazhuang

Height
- Height: 246 m (807 ft)

Technical details
- Floor count: 53 (+3 below ground)
- Floor area: 174,000 square metres (1,870,000 ft^{2})

Design and construction
- Architect: KKS International
- Developer: Fincera Inc.

Kaiyuan Finance Center
- Simplified Chinese: 开元金融中心
- Traditional Chinese: 開元金融中心
Transcriptions
Standard Mandarin
- Hanyu Pinyin: Kāiyuán Jīnróng Zhōngxīn

Kaiyuan World Center
- Simplified Chinese: 开元环球中心
- Traditional Chinese: 開元環球中心
Transcriptions
Standard Mandarin
- Hanyu Pinyin: Kāiyuán Huánqiú Zhōngxīn

Kaiyuan Finance Center (Chinese: 开元金融中心; pinyin: Kāiyuán Jīnróng Zhōngxīn) is a 53-story, 246 m (807 ft) skyscraper built in 2012 in Shijiazhuang, Hebei, China. The building is located in the central business district of Shijiazhuang, and as of January 2020, it's the tallest in the city.

Designed by International and developed by Fincera Inc., an e-commerce company serving small and medium-sized Chinese businesses, the building serves as the company's headquarters. It's also home to Hilton Shijiazhuang. In a mixed-use building, 20 floors consist of hotel rooms, while 21 floors are office space.

== Tenants ==
Floors 1–4 consist of lobbies, restaurants, and meeting rooms. Floors 5 through 27 are office space. The sky lobby occupies the 29th to the 31st floor. Floors 32–53 belong to Hilton Shijiazhuang, the largest tenant of the building. Maintenance levels occupy floors 12, 28, and 40.

== See also ==
- List of tallest buildings in Shijiazhuang
