= Xiaocheng =

Xiaocheng may refer to:

- Xiaocheng (筱埕镇), Lianjiang County, Fuzhou, Fujian Province, China
- Xiaocheng (小城镇), Shulan, Jilin province, China

== People ==
- Empress Xiaocheng, an empress of the Han dynasty
- King Xiaocheng of Zhao, a king of the State of Zhao
- Ji Xiaocheng (1923–2019), a Chinese paediatrician
- Yu Hsiao-cheng (虞孝成; Yú Xiàochéng), a Taiwanese politician

== See also ==
- Taipei Xiaocheng light rail station, a light rail station of the Ankeng light rail
