= Qiaodong District, Shijiazhuang =

Coordinates: 38°02′30″N 114°30′00″E

Qiaodong 桥东区
- District
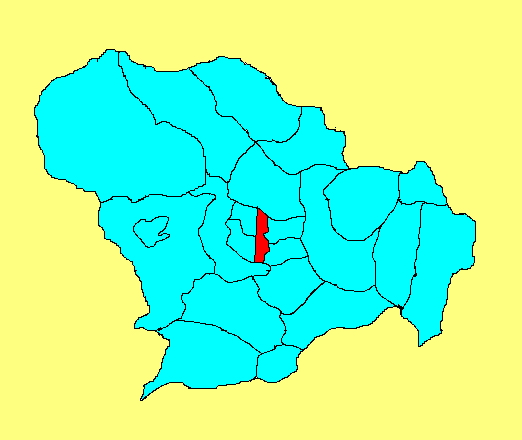
- Location of the county
- Country: China
- Province: Hebei
- Prefecture: Shijiazhuang
- Time zone: UTC+8 (China Standard)

Qiaodong District (simplified Chinese: 桥东区; traditional Chinese: 橋東區; pinyin: Qiáodōng Qū; lit. 'East of the Bridge') is a former district of Shijiazhuang, the capital of Hebei Province in North China. The district was abolished in September 2014, and its administrative area was split and merged into Chang'an and Qiaoxi districts.

== Administrative divisions ==
There were 9 subdistricts and 1 town in the district.

- East Zhongshan Road Subdistrict (中山东路街道)
- Penghou Subdistrict (彭后街道)
- Dongfeng Subdistrict (东风街道)
- Donghua Subdistrict (东华街道)
- Xiumen Subdistrict (休门街道)
- Fukang Subdistrict (阜康街道)
- Jian'an Subdistrict (建安街道)
- Shengli North Subdistrict (胜利北街道)
- Huitong Subdistrict (汇通街道)
- Taoyuan Town (桃园镇)
