= Yucai School =

Yucai School may refer to:

- Chengdu – Yucai School Attached to Sichuan Chengdu No.7 High School
- Chongqing Yucai Middle School
- Guangzhou Yucai Middle School
- Hangzhou Yucai Middle School
- Jinan Yucai Middle School
- Jining Yucai Middle School
- Northeast Yucai School
- Qingdao Yucai Middle School
- Shanghai Yucai High School
- Shenzhen Yucai High School
- Xiamen Yucai Middle School
