= Yuejin Subdistrict, Shijiazhuang =

Coordinates: 38°02′59″N 114°32′52″E

Yuejin Subdistrict 跃进街道
- Subdistrict
- Interactive map of Yuejin Subdistrict
- Country: China
- Province: Hebei
- Prefecture: Shijiazhuang
- District: Chang'an District
- Time zone: UTC+8 (China Standard Time)

Yuejin Subdistrict (Chinese: 跃进街道) is a township-level division of Chang'an District, Shijiazhuang, Hebei, China.

== Demographics ==
Yuejin Subdistrict (跃进街道) in Chang’an District of Shijiazhuang covers approximately 4.87 km² and had a permanent resident population of about 30,101 people as of the latest local government figures.

== See also ==
- List of township-level divisions of Hebei
