= Xizhaotong =

Coordinates: 38°04′N 114°37′E

Xizhaotong 西兆通镇
- Town

Chinese transcription(s)
- Interactive map of Xizhaotong
- Country: China
- Province: Hebei
- Prefecture: Shijiazhuang
- District: Chang'an District
- Time zone: UTC+8 (China Standard Time)

Xizhaotong (Chinese: 西兆通镇) is a township-level division of Chang'an District, Shijiazhuang, Hebei, China.

== See also ==
- List of township-level divisions of Hebei
