= Nancun, Hebei =

Coordinates: 38.06183°N 114.63575°E

Nancun 南村镇
- Town

Chinese transcription(s)
- Interactive map of Nancun
- Country: China
- Province: Hebei
- Prefecture: Shijiazhuang
- District: Chang'an District
- Time zone: UTC+8 (China Standard Time)

Nancun (Chinese: 南村镇) is a township-level division of Chang'an District, Shijiazhuang, Hebei, China. In 1977, a piece of ceramic created 5400–5500 years ago and designed to look like a silkworm was discovered in the area, providing the earliest known evidence of sericulture.

== See also ==
- List of township-level divisions of Hebei
