= Penghou Subdistrict =

Coordinates: 38°01′47″N 114°29′44″E

Penghou Subdistrict 彭后街道
- Subdistrict

Chinese transcription(s)
- Interactive map of Penghou Subdistrict
- Country: China
- Province: Hebei
- Prefecture: Shijiazhuang
- District: Qiaodong District
- Time zone: UTC+8 (China Standard Time)

Penghou Subdistrict (Chinese: 彭后街道) is a township-level division of Qiaodong District, Shijiazhuang, Hebei, China.

== See also ==
- List of township-level divisions of Hebei
