= List of tallest buildings in Shijiazhuang =

Tall buildings in Shijiazhuang
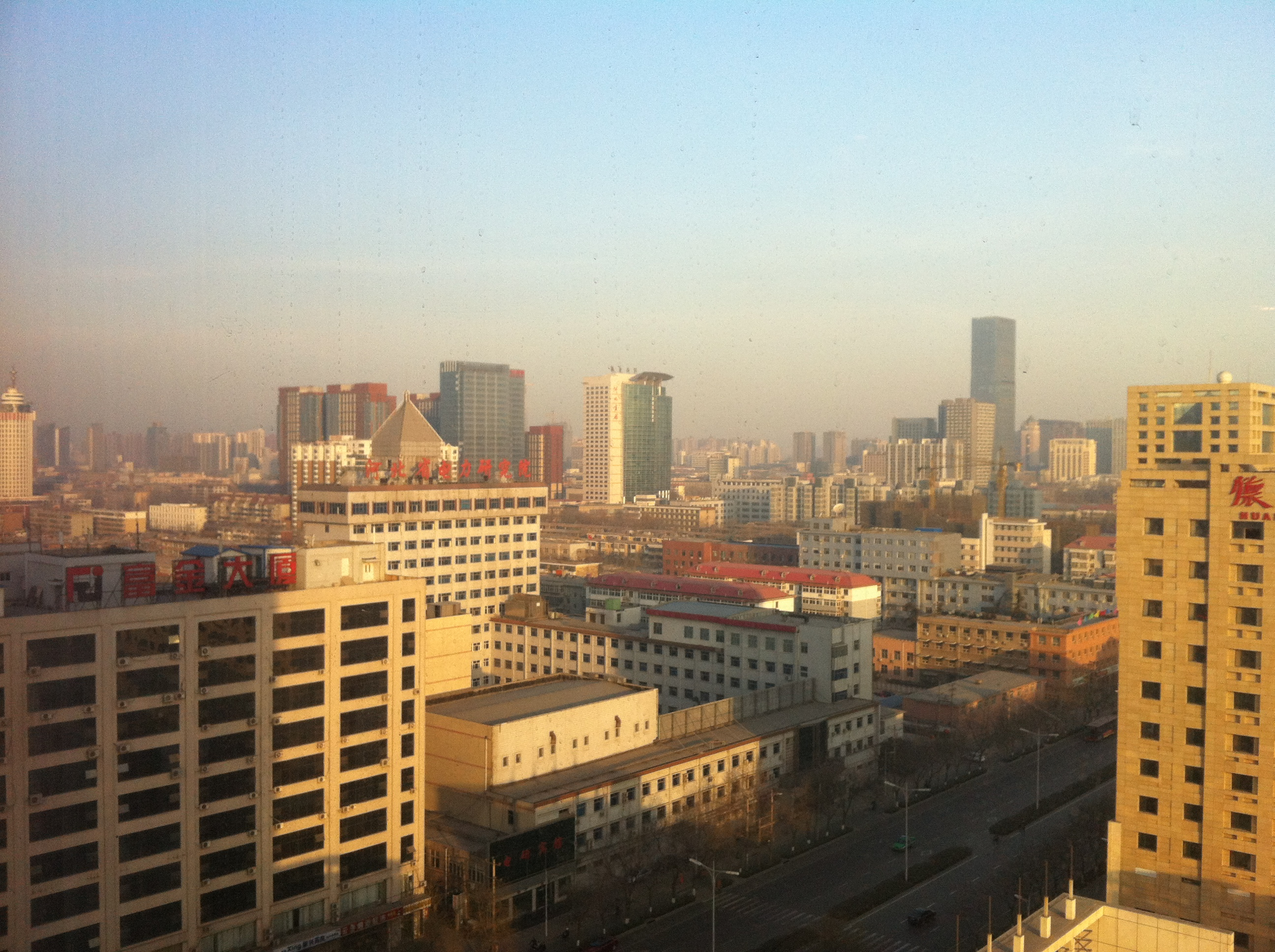
- Downdown Shijiazhuang with Kaiyuan Finance Center in the background in 2012
- Tallest building: Kaiyuan Finance Center (2012)
- Tallest building height: 246 m (807 ft)
- Tallest structure: Shijiazhuang TV Tower (1998)
- Tallest structure height: 280 m (919 ft)
- First 150 m+ building: Shijiazhuang No. 2 Telecommunications Hub (2002)

Number of tall buildings
- Taller than 150 m (492 ft): 15 (2025)
- Taller than 200 m (656 ft): 3

This list of tallest buildings in Shijiazhuang ranks skyscrapers in Shijiazhuang, Hebei, China by height. Shijiazhuang is the capital and the largest city in Hebei province. Just 2 hours away from China's capital, Beijing, it is one of the principal cities in the Jing-Jin-Ji Metropolitan Region. With 10 million residents in the prefecture level area and 4 million residents in the urban districts, it's the 26th most populous city in China.

The tallest building in Shijiazhuang is Kaiyuan Finance Center, which is 246 m (807 ft) high, while Shijiazhuang TV Tower, which stands at 280 m (920 ft) is the tallest structure in the city. Shijiazhuang has 15 completed buildings taller than 150 m (492 ft) as of 2026. The proposed supertall skyscraper of Tianshan Gate of the World Plots 27 and 28, which was planned to reach a height of 450 meters (1,476 ft) was ultimately never built.

While Shijiazhuang saw the construction of several tall office and hotel skyscrapers in the 2010s, no significant skyscrapers have been built in the city during the 2020s. This is expected to change with a total of four office skyscrapers above 150 metersunder construction as of 2025.

== Tallest buildings ==
The following lists ranks the tallest buildings in Shijiazhuang that are over 150 m (492 ft) in height.

Rank	Name	Image	Height m / feet	Floors	Year	Notes
-	Shijiazhuang TV Tower		280 / 919	5	1998	
1	Kaiyuan Finance Center		246 / 807	53	2012	
2	Shijiazhuang No. 2 Telecommunications Hub		213 / 699	43	2001	
3	Lerthai Center 2		212.8 / 698	46	2013	Also known as Honor Hill
4	Suning Plaza		198.8 / 652	45	2013	
5	Lerthai Center 3		195 / 640	45	2013	Also known as Noble Hill
6	Lerthai Center 1		179.9 / 590	29	2013	Also known as Wisdom Hill
7	Huaqiang Plaza		170 / 558	38	2014	
8	Haiyue World International		167 / 548	38	2010	
9	New Cooperation Tower		166.8 / 547	38	2019	
10	Hyde International Plaza		166 / 545	38	2013	
11	Star World Center Tower 1		160.4 / 526	37	2017	
12	Star World Center Tower 2		160.4 / 526	37	2017	
13	Hebei International Plaza 1		160 / 525	35	2013	
14	Xinyuan-Honey Mart		160 / 525	36	2018	
15	Shijiazhuang Pelagic Hotel		158 / 518	38	2009	

== Tallest under construction or proposed ==
=== Under construction ===
Below is a list of buildings under construction in Shijiazhuang that are expected to reach over 150 m (492 ft) in height.

Name	Floors	Height m	Year	Usage
Tianshan Gate of the World Block M	-	200	2026	Office
Xinyanzhao Fortune Center 1	46	186.8	-	Multiple
Xinyanzhao Fortune Center 2	46	186.8	-	Multiple
Shijiazhuang Baoneng Center Tower 1	37	160	-	Office
Tianshan Gate of the World Block K	-	150	2026	Office
Tianshan Gate of the World Medical Office Building	-	150	2025	Office / Hospital
Gold Finger Group Headquarters	33	150	2025	Office

=== Proposed ===
Name	Height m / feet	Floors	Notes
Taihang Pearl Tower	580 / 1,902.8		
Shijiazhuang International Convention & Exhibition Center	330 / 1,083	82	
