= Huitong Subdistrict =

Huitong Subdistrict 汇通街道
- Subdistrict
- Location in Hebei
- Coordinates: 38°00′34″N 114°29′33″E
- Country: People's Republic of China
- Province: Hebei
- Prefecture-level city: Shijiazhuang
- District: Qiaodong
- Village-level divisions: 7 residential communities
- Elevation: 72 m (236 ft)
- Time zone: UTC+8 (China Standard)
- Postal code: 050021
- Area code: 0311

Huitong Subdistrict (simplified Chinese: 汇通街道; traditional Chinese: 匯通街道; pinyin: Huìtōng Jiēdào) is a subdistrict of Qiaodong District, in the south of Shijiazhuang, Hebei, People's Republic of China. As of 2011, it has 7 residential communities (社区) under its administration.

== See also ==
- List of township-level divisions of Hebei
