= Guang'an Subdistrict =

Guang'an Subdistrict 广安街道
- Subdistrict
- Location in Hebei
- Coordinates: 38°03′05″N 114°30′57″E
- Country: People's Republic of China
- Province: Hebei
- Prefecture-level city: Shijiazhuang
- District: Chang'an
- Village-level divisions: 8 residential communities
- Elevation: 81 m (266 ft)
- Time zone: UTC+8 (China Standard)
- Postal code: 050000
- Area code: 0311

Guang'an Subdistrict (simplified Chinese: 广安街道; traditional Chinese: 廣安街道; pinyin: Guǎng'ān Jiēdào) is a subdistrict and the seat of Chang'an District, in the heart of Shijiazhuang, Hebei, People's Republic of China. As of 2011, it has 8 residential communities (社区) under its administration.

== See also ==
- List of township-level divisions of Hebei
