= Tangu Subdistrict =

Coordinates: 38°02′59″N 114°34′08″E

Tangu Subdistrict 谈固街道
- Subdistrict

Chinese transcription(s)
- Interactive map of Tangu Subdistrict
- Country: China
- Province: Hebei
- Prefecture: Shijiazhuang
- District: Chang'an District
- Time zone: UTC+8 (China Standard Time)

Tangu Subdistrict (Chinese: 谈固街道) is a township-level division of Chang'an District, Shijiazhuang, Hebei, China.

== See also ==
- List of township-level divisions of Hebei
