= Gaoying =

Gaoying 高营镇
- Town
- Location in Hebei
- Coordinates: 38°05′19″N 114°33′22″E
- Country: People's Republic of China
- Province: Hebei
- Prefecture-level city: Shijiazhuang
- District: Chang'an
- Village-level divisions: 20 villages
- Elevation: 58 m (190 ft)
- Time zone: UTC+8 (China Standard)
- Postal code: 050041
- Area code: 0311

Gaoying (simplified Chinese: 高营; traditional Chinese: 高營; pinyin: Gāoyíng) is a town of Chang'an District, in the northeast outskirts of Shijiazhuang, Hebei province, China. As of 2011, it has 6 residential communities (社区) under its administration.

== See also ==
- List of township-level divisions of Hebei
