= Shijiazhuang TV Tower =

- 石家庄电视塔
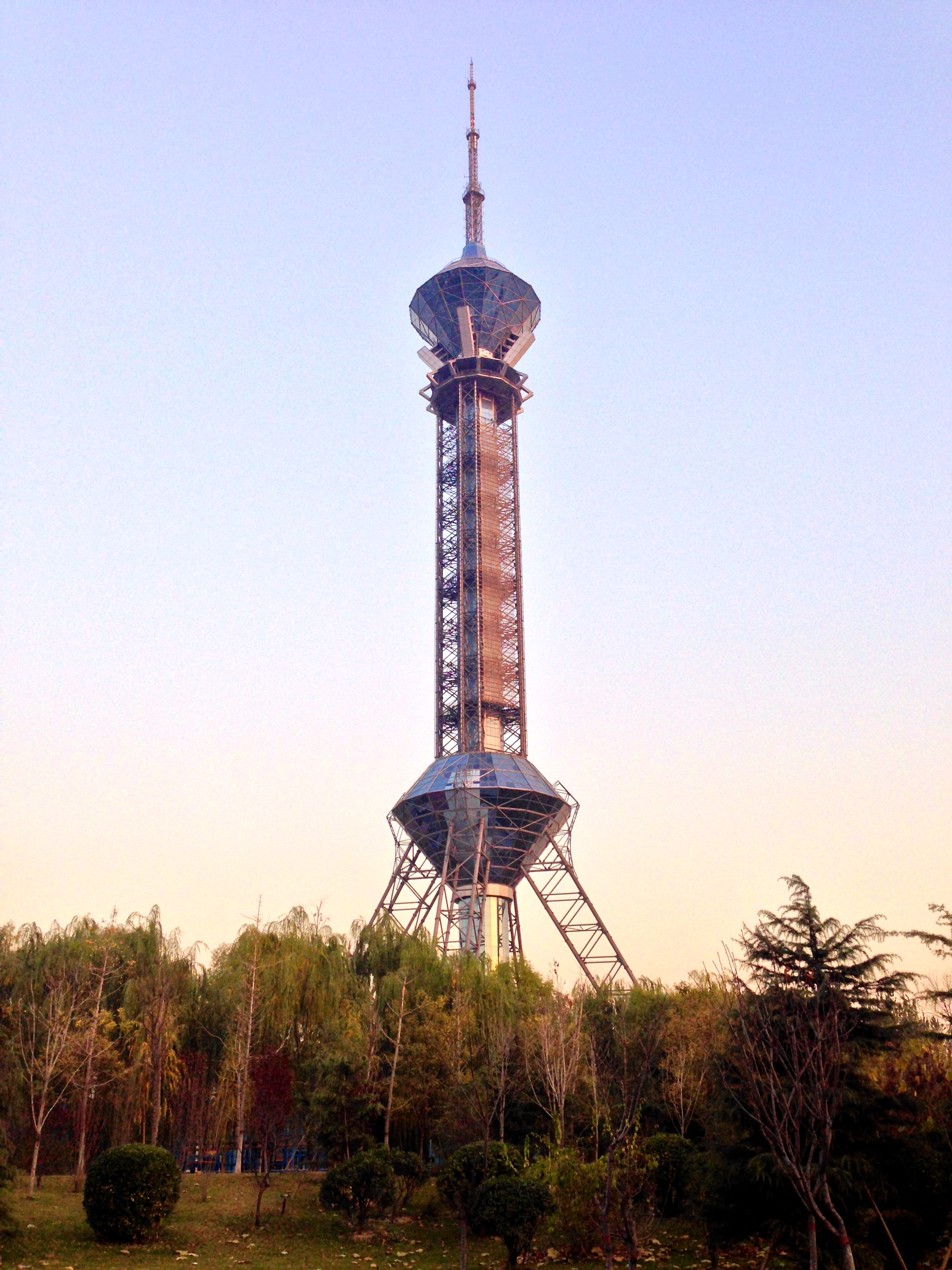
- Shijiazhuang TV Tower in November 2013

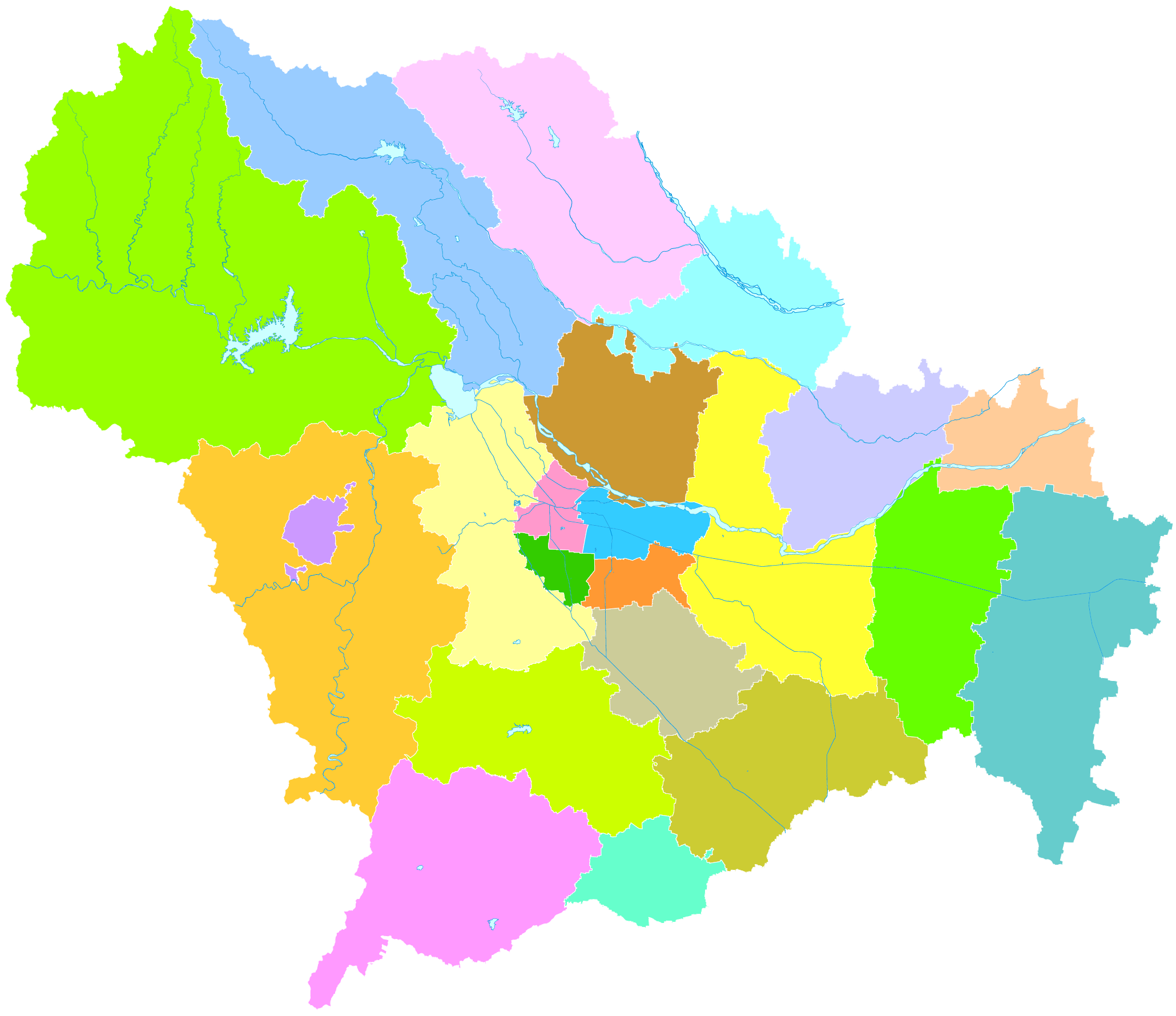
- Location in Hebei/Shijiazhuang Shijiazhuang TV Tower (Shijiazhuang)

General information
- Status: Completed
- Type: Mixed use: Restaurant, Observation, Telecommunications
- Location: 263 S Tiyu St, Yuhua District, Shijiazhuang, Hebei
- Coordinates: 38°01′15.81″N 114°31′40.14″E
- Groundbreaking: c. 1997
- Construction started: January 1997
- Topped-out: 1998
- Completed: 1998
- Opening: October 1, 2000

Height
- Tip: 280 m (919 ft)
- Roof: 200 m (656 ft)

Technical details
- Floor count: 5 floors

Shijiazhuang TV Tower is a 280-metre (920 ft) tall free standing lattice tower used for communication built in 1998 in the city of Shijiazhuang, China.

== See also ==
- List of towers
- Lattice tower
- List of tallest freestanding steel structures
- List of tallest buildings in Shijiazhuang
