= Jianbei Subdistrict =

Jianbei Subdistrict 建北街道
- Subdistrict
- Location in Hebei
- Coordinates: 38°03′38″N 114°30′20″E
- Country: People's Republic of China
- Province: Hebei
- Prefecture-level city: Shijiazhuang
- District: Chang'an
- Village-level divisions: 7 residential communities
- Elevation: 78 m (256 ft)
- Time zone: UTC+8 (China Standard)
- Postal code: 050000
- Area code: 0311

Jianbei Subdistrict (Chinese: 建北街道; pinyin: Jiànběi Jiēdào) is a subdistrict and the seat of Chang'an District, Shijiazhuang, Hebei, People's Republic of China. As of 2011, it has seven residential communities (社区) under its administration.

== See also ==
- List of township-level divisions of Hebei
