= Dongfeng Subdistrict, Shijiazhuang =

Dongfeng Subdistrict 东风街道
- Subdistrict
- Location in Hebei
- Coordinates: 38°01′51″N 114°30′14″E
- Country: People's Republic of China
- Province: Hebei
- Prefecture-level city: Shijiazhuang
- District: Qiaodong
- Village-level divisions: 5 residential communities
- Elevation: 78 m (256 ft)
- Time zone: UTC+8 (China Standard)
- Area code: 0311

Dongfeng Subdistrict (simplified Chinese: 东风街道; traditional Chinese: 東風街道; pinyin: Dōngfēng Jiēdào; lit. 'east wind') is a subdistrict of Qiaodong District, in the heart of Shijiazhuang, Hebei, People's Republic of China. As of 2011, it has 5 residential communities (居委会) under its administration.

== See also ==
- List of township-level divisions of Hebei
