= Sericulture =

Process of silk production

Sericulture, or silk farming, is the cultivation of silkworms to produce silk. Although there are several commercial species of silkworms, the caterpillar of the domestic silkmoth is the most widely used and intensively studied silkworm. This species of silkmoth is no longer found in the wild as they have been modified through selective breeding, rendering most flightless and without defense against predators. Silk is believed to have first been produced in China as early as the Neolithic period. Today, China and India are the two main producers, with more than 60% of the world's annual production.

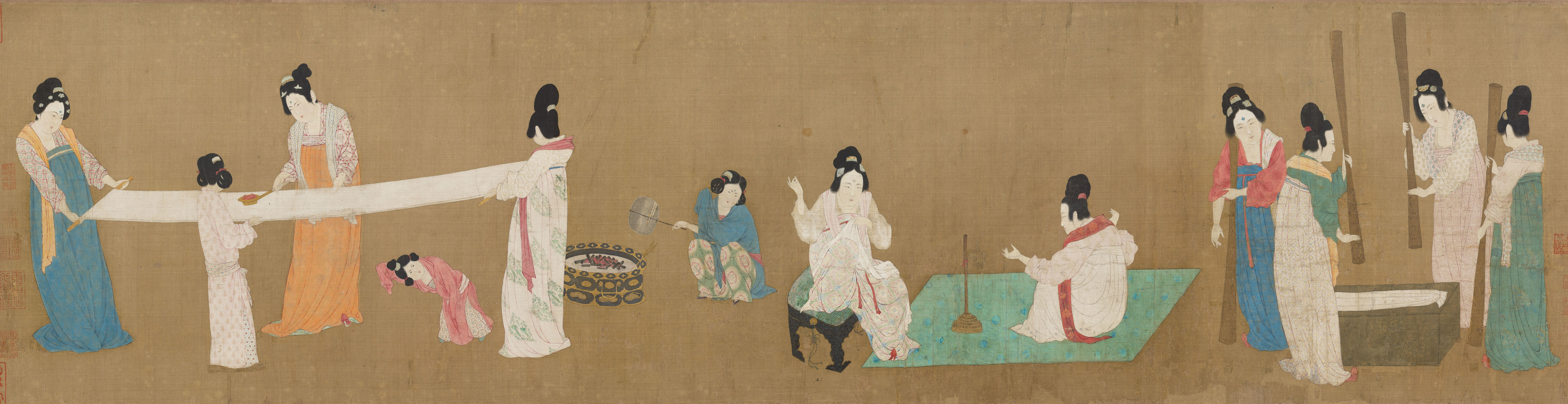
Court Ladies Preparing Newly Woven Silk by Zhang Xuan (713–755), reproduced by Emperor Huizong in the 12th century

== History ==
According to Confucian text, the discovery of silk production dates to about 2700 BCE, although archaeological records point to silk cultivation as early as the Yangshao period (5000–3000 BCE). In 1977, a piece of ceramic created 5400–5500 years ago and designed to look like a silkworm was discovered in Nancun, Hebei, providing the earliest known evidence of sericulture. Also, by careful analysis of archaeological silk fibre found on Indus Civilization sites dating back to 2450–2000 BCE, it is believed that silk was being used over a wide region of South Asia. By about the first half of the 1st century CE, it had reached ancient Khotan, by a series of interactions along the Silk Road. By 140 CE, the practice had been established in India. In the 6th century CE, the smuggling of silkworm eggs into the Byzantine Empire led to its establishment in the Mediterranean, remaining a monopoly in the Byzantine Empire for centuries (Byzantine silk). In 1147, during the Second Crusade, Roger II of Sicily (1095–1154) attacked Corinth and Thebes, two important centres of Byzantine silk production, capturing the weavers and their equipment and establishing his own silkworks in Palermo and Calabria, eventually spreading the industry to Western Europe.

Traditional Chinese process

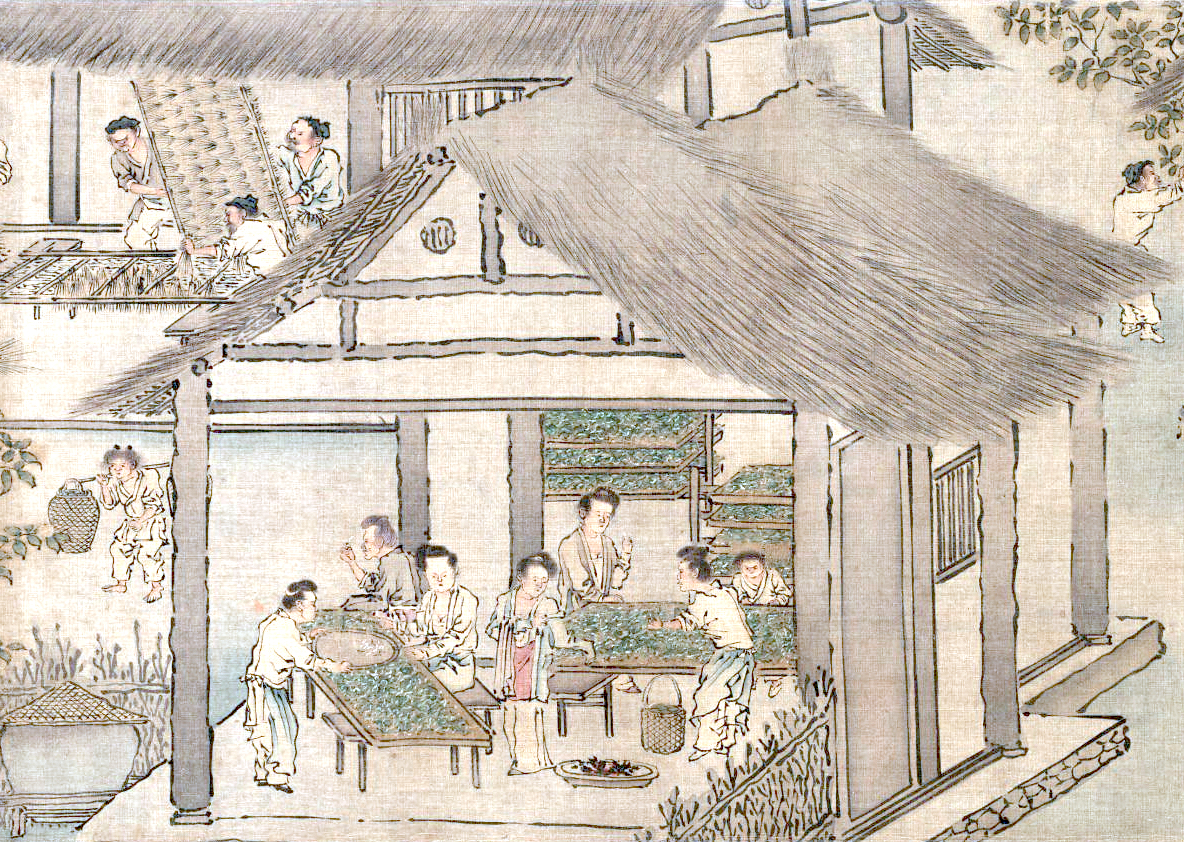
The silkworms and mulberry leaves are placed on trays.

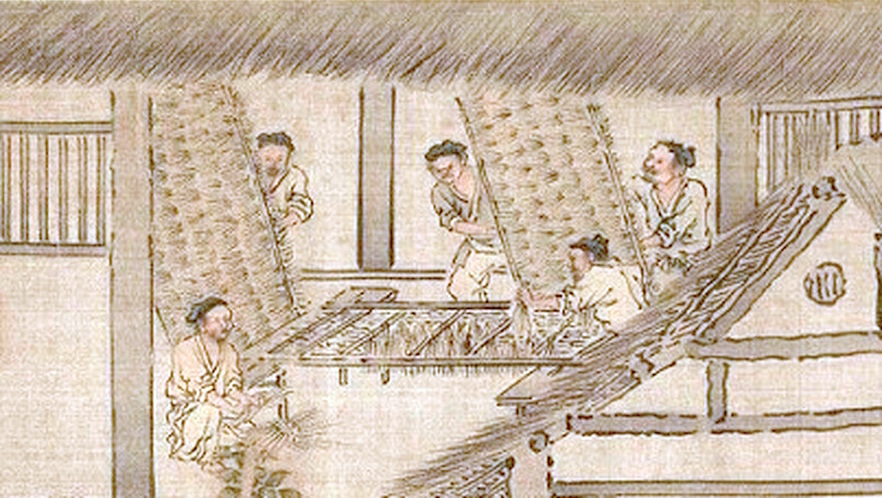
Twig frames for the silkworms are prepared.

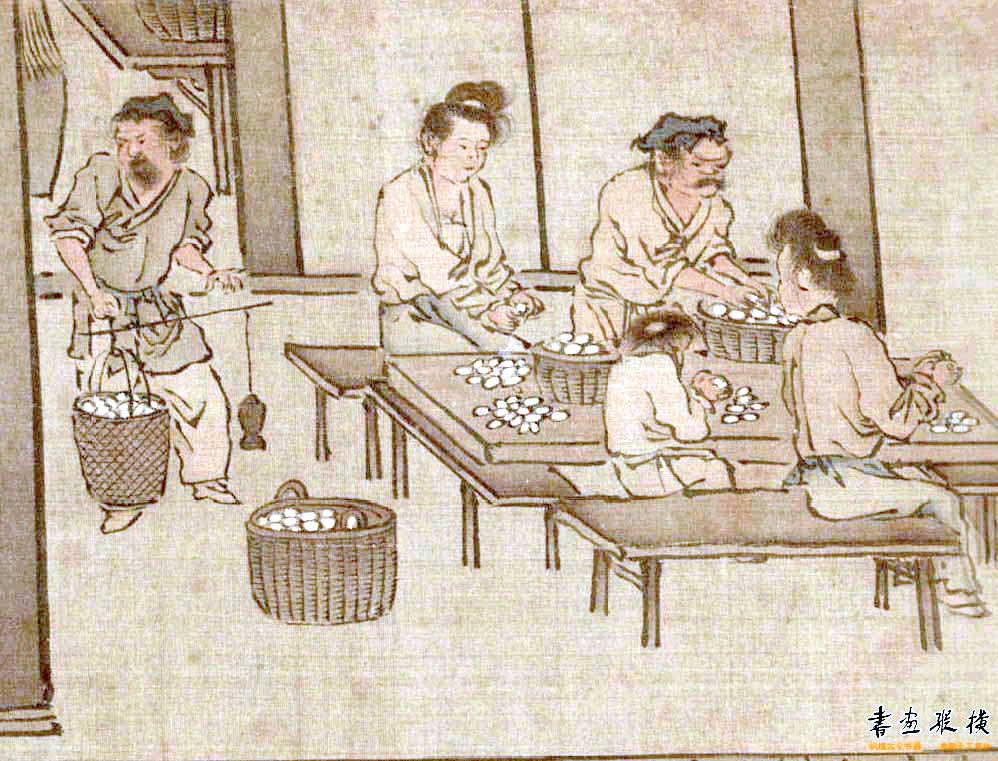
The cocoons are weighed.

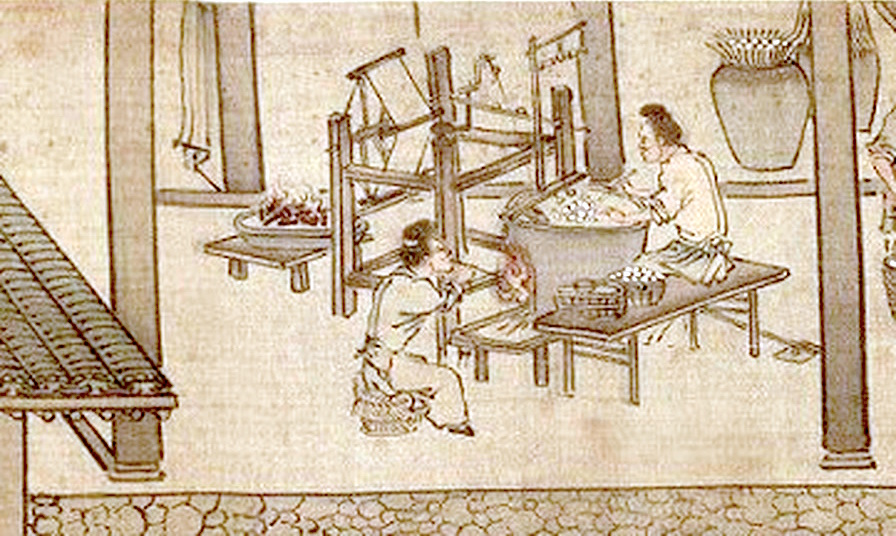
The cocoons are boiled and the silk is wound on spools.

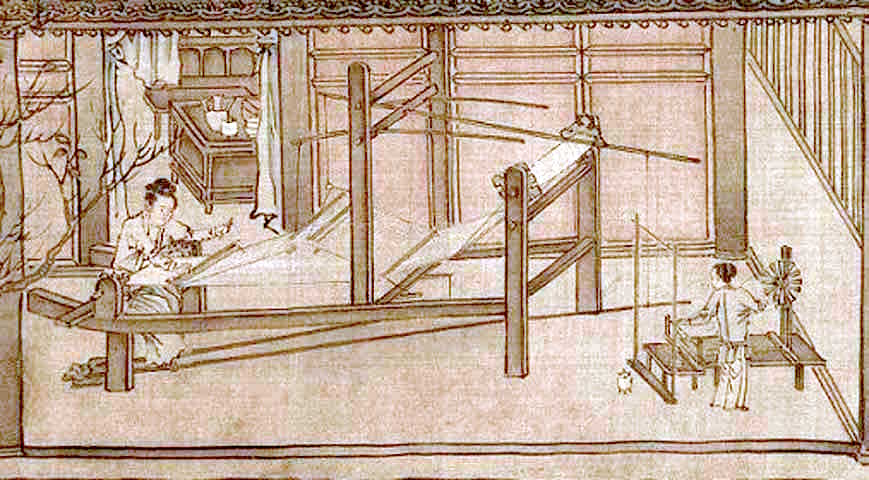
The silk is woven using a loom.

== Production ==
The silkworms are fed with mulberry leaves, and after the fourth moult, they climb a twig placed near them and spin their silken cocoons. The silk is a continuous filament comprising fibroin protein, secreted from two salivary glands in the head of each worm, and a gum called sericin, which cements the filaments. The sericin is removed by placing the cocoons in hot water, which frees the silk filaments and readies them for reeling. This is known as the degumming process. The immersion in hot water also kills the silkmoth pupa.

Single filaments are combined to form thread, in a process called "throwing", which is drawn under tension through several guides and wound onto reels. This process of throwing produces various yarns depending on the amount and direction of the twisting. The threads may be plied to form yarn (short staple lengths are spun; see silk noil). After drying, the raw silk is packed according to quality.

== Sustainable silk ==
=== Peace silk ===
The most popular substitute for traditional silk is peace silk, also known as ahimsa silk. This substitute's primary ethical appeal is that moths are permitted to emerge from their cocoons and fly away prior to boiling. Thus, the pupae are not cooked alive during manufacture. However, because of centuries of selective breeding, domesticated silkworms lack the adaptations to survive after emerging from their cocoons. They are unable to defend themselves against predators since they cannot fly or see clearly. They typically die soon after emerging from their cocoons as a result.

=== Wild silk ===
The cocoons of Tussar silkworms, which are found in open woodlands, are used to produce wild silk, also known as Tussar silk. Compared to conventional silk, their cocoons are typically picked after the moths have emerged, making it a more ethical option. Because wild silkworms consume a variety of plants, their fabric is less uniform but more robust. Wild silk production, especially that of Tussar silk, typically involves fewer chemical treatments than conventional silk because it is often processed without degumming or bleaching, processes commonly used in mulberry silk production. The pupae are still inside the cocoons when they are harvested by certain enterprises that employ "wild silk", though.

=== Stages of production ===
The stages of production are as follows:

1. The female silkmoth lays 300 to 500 eggs.
2. The silkmoth eggs hatch to form larvae or caterpillars, known as silkworms.
3. The larvae feed on mulberry leaves.
4. Having grown and moulted several times, the silkworm extrudes a silk fibre and forms a net to hold itself.
5. It swings itself from side to side in a figure '8', distributing the saliva that will form silk.
6. The silk solidifies when it contacts the air.
7. The silkworm spins approximately one mile of filament and completely encloses itself in a cocoon in about two or three days. The amount of usable quality silk in each cocoon is small. As a result, about 2,500 silkworms are required to produce a pound of raw silk.
8. The intact cocoons are boiled, killing the silkworm pupa.
9. The silk is obtained by brushing the undamaged cocoon to find the outside end of the filament.
10. The silk filaments are then wound on a reel. One cocoon contains approximately 1,000 yards (910 m) of silk filament. The silk at this stage is known as raw silk. One thread comprises up to 48 individual silk filaments.

Mahatma Gandhi was critical of silk production based on the Ahimsa philosophy "not to hurt any living thing". He also promoted "Ahimsa silk", made without boiling the pupa to procure the silk and wild silk made from the cocoons of wild and semiwild silkmoths. The Human League also criticised sericulture in their early single "Being Boiled". The organisation PETA has also campaigned against silk.

== Pupae as food ==
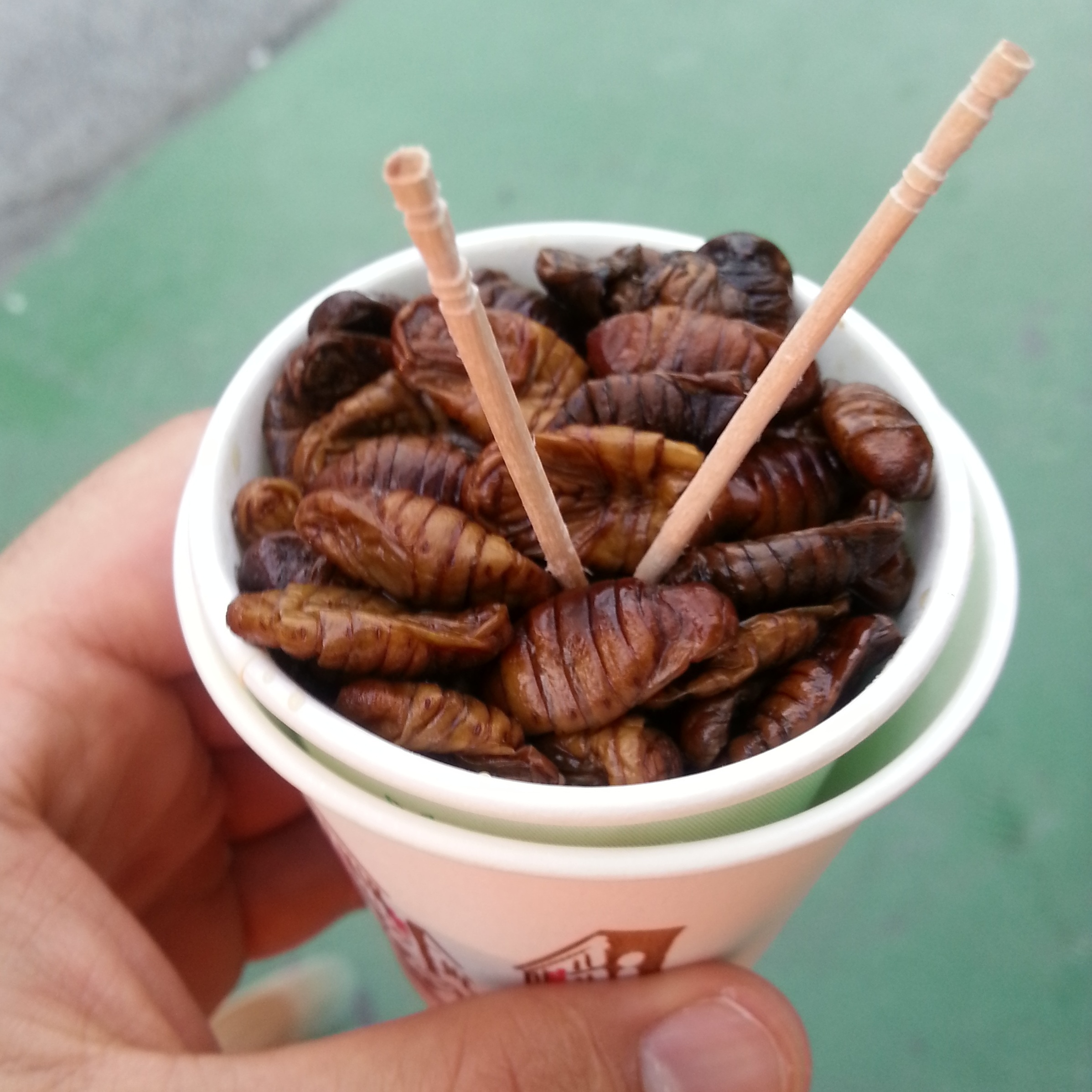
Beondegi

The conventional method of silk production results in ~8 kg of wet silkworm pupae and ~2 kg of dry pupae per kilogram of raw silk. This byproduct has historically been consumed by people in silk-producing areas.

== Gallery ==
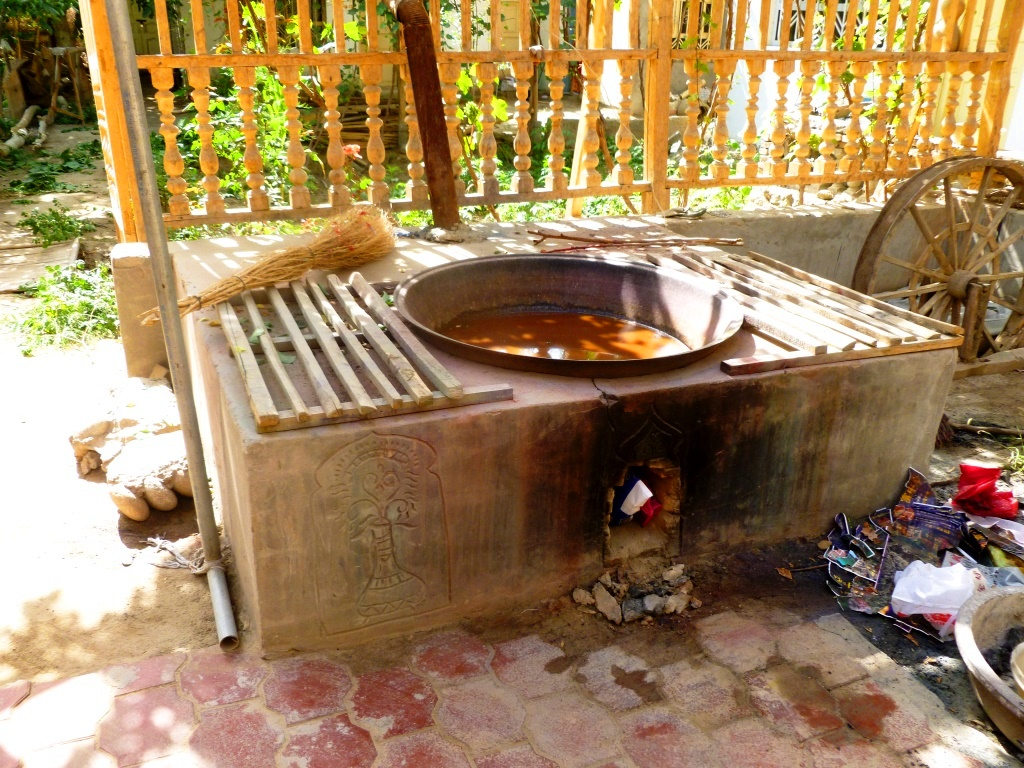
Dye in pan on stove. Khotan

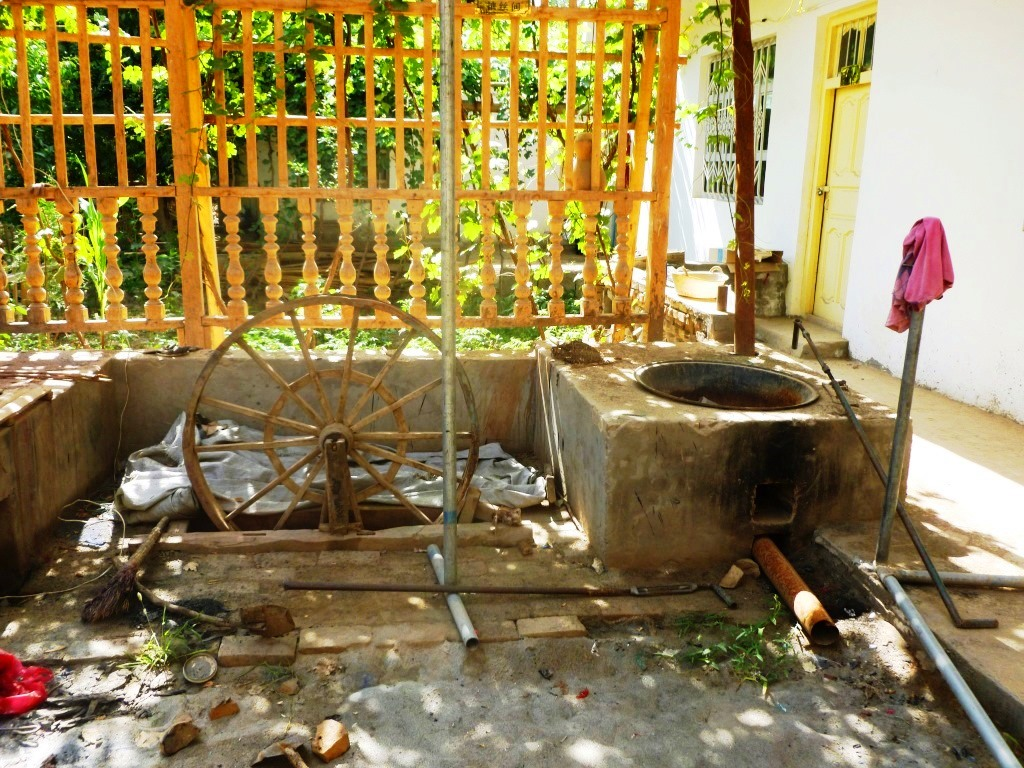
Equipment for unravelling silk cocoons, Khotan

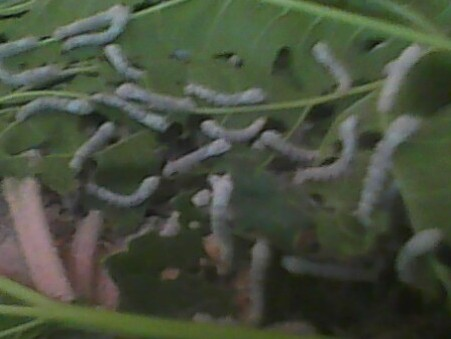
The third stage of the silkworm

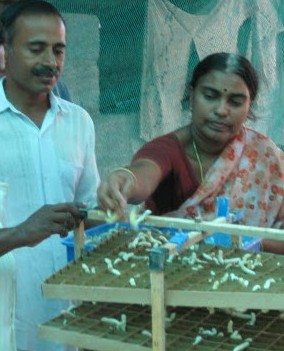
Silkworms on a modern rotary mountage

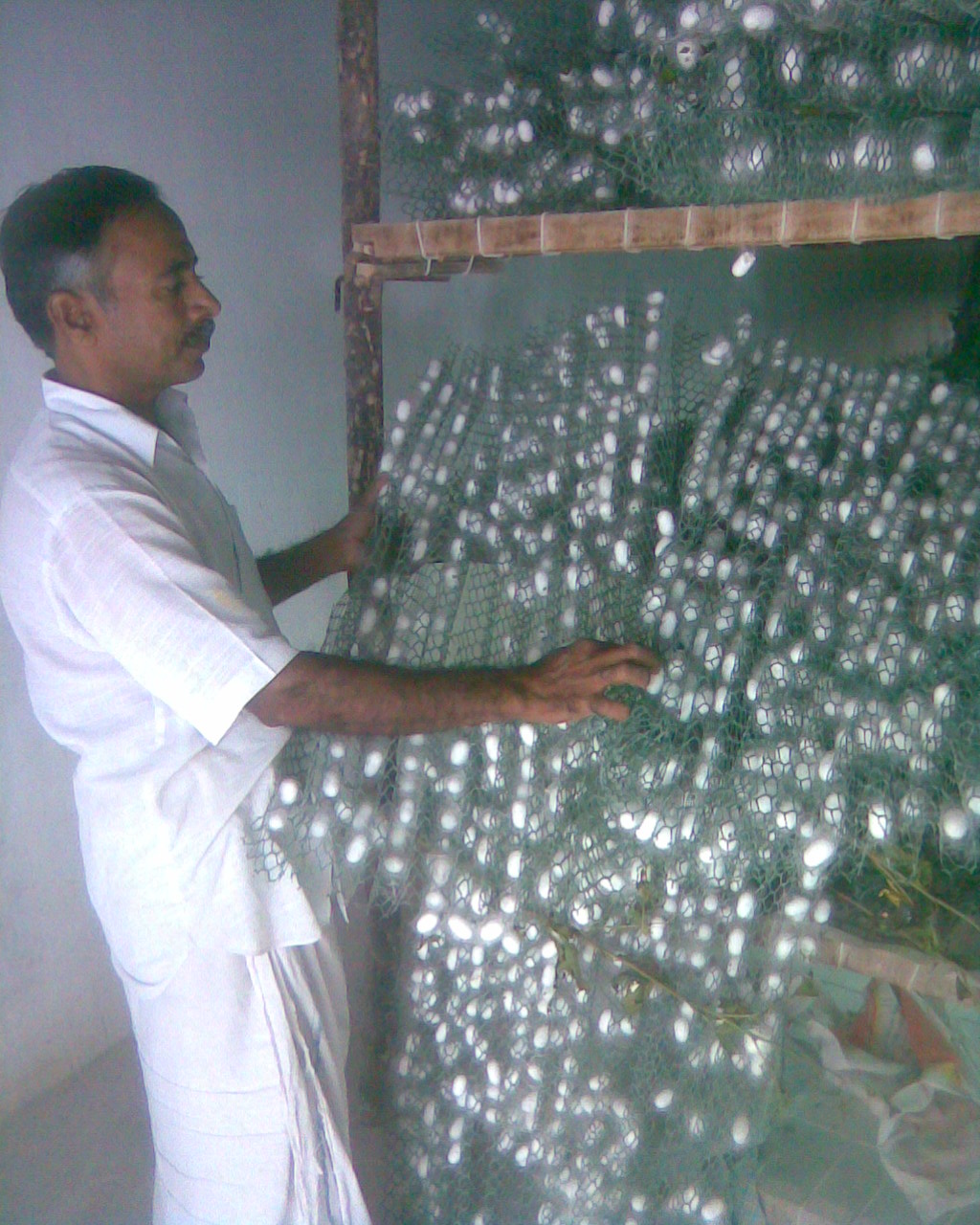
Silk cocoons on mountages

== See also ==
- Macclesfield silk museums
- Magnanery
- Silk industry in Azerbaijan
- Silk industry in China
- Silk mill of Caraglio and Museum
