= Hedong Subdistrict, Shijiazhuang =

Hedong Subdistrict 河东街道
- Subdistrict
- Location in Hebei
- Coordinates: 38°02′33″N 114°32′19″E
- Country: People's Republic of China
- Province: Hebei
- Prefecture-level city: Shijiazhuang
- District: Chang'an
- Village-level divisions: 10 residential communities
- Elevation: 78 m (256 ft)
- Time zone: UTC+8 (China Standard)
- Postal code: 050000
- Area code: 0311

Hedong Subdistrict (simplified Chinese: 河东街道; traditional Chinese: 河東街道; pinyin: Hédōng Jiēdào) is a subdistrict and the seat of Chang'an District, in the heart of Shijiazhuang, Hebei, People's Republic of China. As of 2018, it has 10 residential communities (社区) under its administration.

== See also ==
- List of township-level divisions of Hebei
