= Qingyuan Subdistrict, Shijiazhuang =

Coordinates: 38.04697°N 114.5132°E

Qingyuan Subdistrict 青园街道
- Subdistrict
- Interactive map of Qingyuan Subdistrict
- Country: China
- Province: Hebei
- Prefecture: Shijiazhuang
- District: Chang'an District
- Time zone: UTC+8 (China Standard Time)

Qingyuan Subdistrict (Chinese: 青园街道) is a township-level division of Chang'an District, Shijiazhuang, Hebei, China.

== Translation ==
The English literal translation for 青园 (Qīng Yuán) is Green (青, Qīng) Garden (园, Yuán).

== See also ==
- List of township-level divisions of Hebei
