= Yucai Subdistrict, Shijiazhuang =

Coordinates: 38°02′59″N 114°31′23″E

Yucai Subdistrict 育才街道
- Subdistrict
- Interactive map of Yucai Subdistrict
- Country: China
- Province: Hebei
- Prefecture: Shijiazhuang
- District: Chang'an District
- Time zone: UTC+8 (China Standard Time)

Yucai Subdistrict (Chinese: 育才街道) is a township-level division of Chang'an District, Shijiazhuang, Hebei, China.

== See also ==
- List of township-level divisions of Hebei
