= Changfeng Subdistrict, Shijiazhuang =

Changfeng Subdistrict 长丰街道
- Subdistrict
- Location in Hebei, China
- Coordinates: 38°04′31″N 114°30′57″E
- Country: People's Republic of China
- Province: Hebei
- Prefecture-level city: Shijiazhuang
- District: Chang'an
- Village-level divisions: 9 residential communities 2 villages
- Elevation: 79 m (259 ft)
- Time zone: UTC+8 (China Standard)
- Postal code: 050041
- Area code: 0311

Changfeng Subdistrict (simplified Chinese: 长丰街道; traditional Chinese: 長豐街道; pinyin: Chángfēng Jiēdào) is a subdistrict of Chang'an District, Shijiazhuang, Hebei, People's Republic of China, located just within the 2nd Ring Road in the northern part of the city. As of 2011, it has 9 residential communities (社区) and 2 villages under its administration.

== See also ==
- List of township-level divisions of Hebei
