= Jian'an Subdistrict, Shijiazhuang =

Jian'an Subdistrict 建安街道
- Subdistrict
- Location in Hebei
- Coordinates: 38°03′06″N 114°30′06″E
- Country: People's Republic of China
- Province: Hebei
- Prefecture-level city: Shijiazhuang
- District: Qiaodong
- Village-level divisions: 6 residential communities
- Elevation: 80 m (260 ft)
- Time zone: UTC+8 (China Standard)
- Postal code: 050000
- Area code: 0311

Jian'an Subdistrict (Chinese: 建安街道; pinyin: Jiàn'ān Jiēdào) is a subdistrict of Qiaodong District, Shijiazhuang, Hebei, People's Republic of China. As of 2011, it has six residential communities (居委会) under its administration.

== See also ==
- List of township-level divisions of Hebei
