= Ji Xiaocheng =

Chinese paediatrician (1923–2019)

- Traditional Chinese: 籍孝誠
- Simplified Chinese: 籍孝诚
Transcriptions
Standard Mandarin
- Hanyu Pinyin: Jí Xiàochéng
- IPA: [tɕǐ ɕjâʊ.ʈʂʰə̌ŋ]

Ji Xiaocheng (Chinese: 籍孝诚; 2 November 1923 – 23 October 2019) was a Chinese paediatrician who served as Director of Paediatrics at Peking Union Medical College Hospital. In the early 1980s, he introduced perinatal medicine to China from the United States, and co-founded China's first neonatal intensive care unit at PUMC Hospital.

== Biography ==
Ji Xiaocheng was born in November 1923 in Renqiu, Hebei, Republic of China. He studied at Beijing Medical College under professor Zhu Futang, and graduated in 1948. He went to the Soviet Union in 1955 to study at the Leningrad Institute of Paediatrics, where he earned an associate doctor degree three and half years later.

Ji worked at the Institute of Paediatrics of Beijing Children's Hospital after returning to China. In 1961, he was transferred to the Department of Paediatrics at Peking Union Medical College Hospital, where he worked under doctors Zhou Huakang 周华康 and Lin Qiaozhi. He served as deputy director and then director of the department from 1982 to 1985.

After the People's Republic of China and the United States established diplomatic relations in 1979, Ji was sponsored by the China Medical Board to study modern medical practices in the United States at the University of California, San Diego. Upon returning to China, he introduced perinatal medicine to the country, and together with doctors Zhou Huakang and Zhao Shimin 赵时敏, established China's first neonatal intensive care unit at PUMC Hospital.

From 1985 to 1989, Ji organized ten Chinese hospitals to participate in the perinatal medicine program of the United Nations Population Fund and helped propagate modern perinatal practices in China.

== Personal life ==
Ji married in 1944 to a college classmate. His wife worked in the Ministry of Health and predeceased him. The couple had two daughters.

Ji retired in 1991. He died on 23 October 2019, aged 95.
