= Guangzhou Yucai Middle School =

Public secondary school in Guangzhou, Guangdong, China

- 广州市育才中学
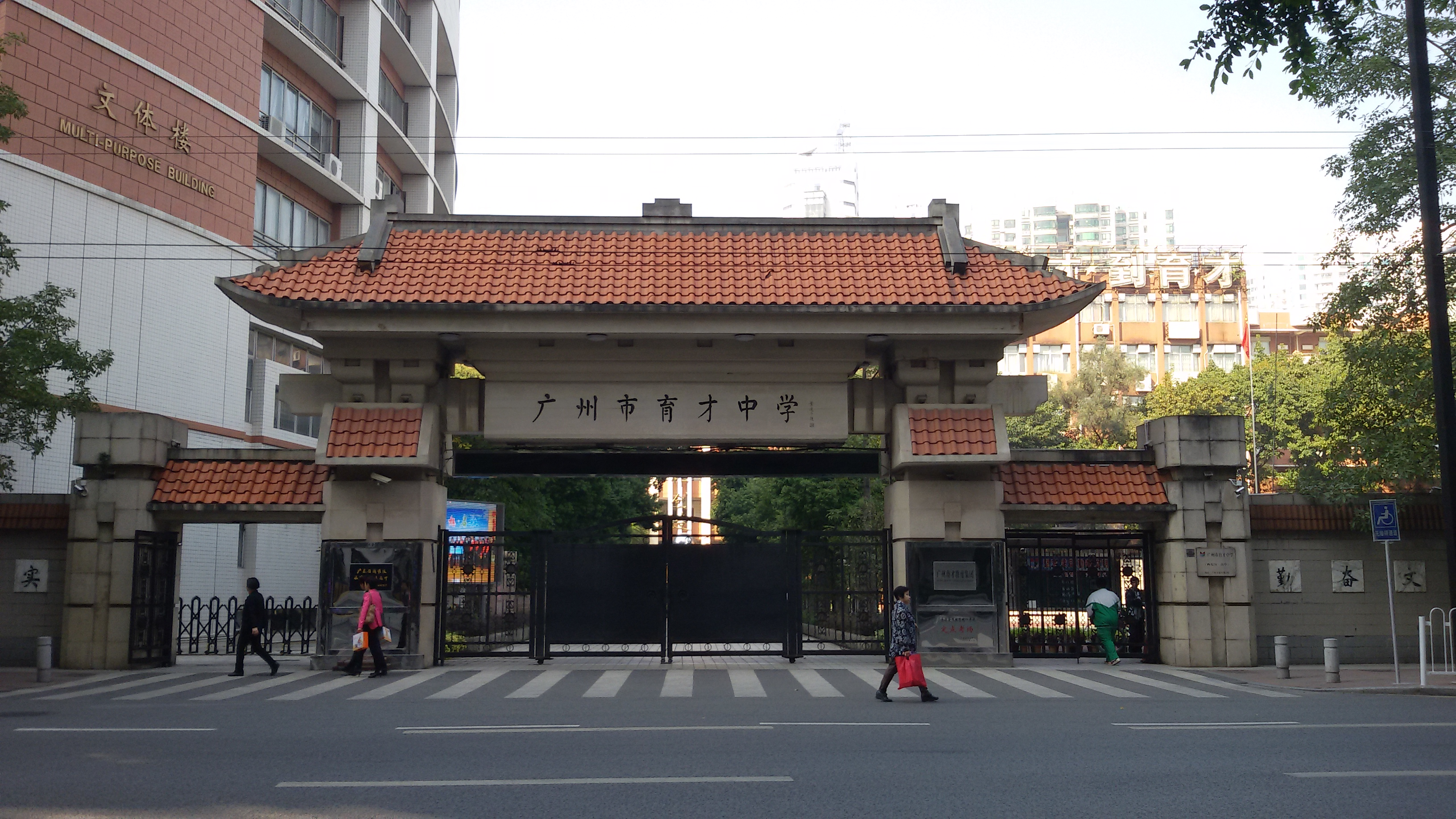

Location
- 21 Seoi Gwan Nam Street; Canton, Guangdong; China; 23.1293°N 113.298°E

Information
- Established: 1951

Guangzhou Yucai Middle School (广州市育才中学) is a public secondary school in Yuexiu, Guangzhou, Guangdong, China. It was founded in 1951. With about 4,000 students, it is one of the largest secondary schools in the province.

== History ==
Originally a primary school, Guangdong Province Yucai School (廣東省育才學校) was founded in 1951. It was the first school set up by the new People's Republic of China administration and the Chinese Communist Party (CCP) in Canton. Intake was composed of mainly children of CCP cadres from outside Guangdong. In 1954 it was relocated to Fujin Road (福今路). From 1961 onward, it transitioned into a middle school.

During the Cultural Revolution, it was renamed Guangzhou No. 62 Middle School in 1968. In 1978, the school was split into two parts—the primary school and the high school. The primary school was named Meihuacun Primary School (梅花村小學). In 1995, the high school was renamed as Guangzhou Yucai Middle School (廣州市育才中學). On 10 December 2002, Guangzhou No. 48 Middle School was merged into Yucai.
