= Renqiu =

Renqiu 任丘市 Jenkiu
- County-level city
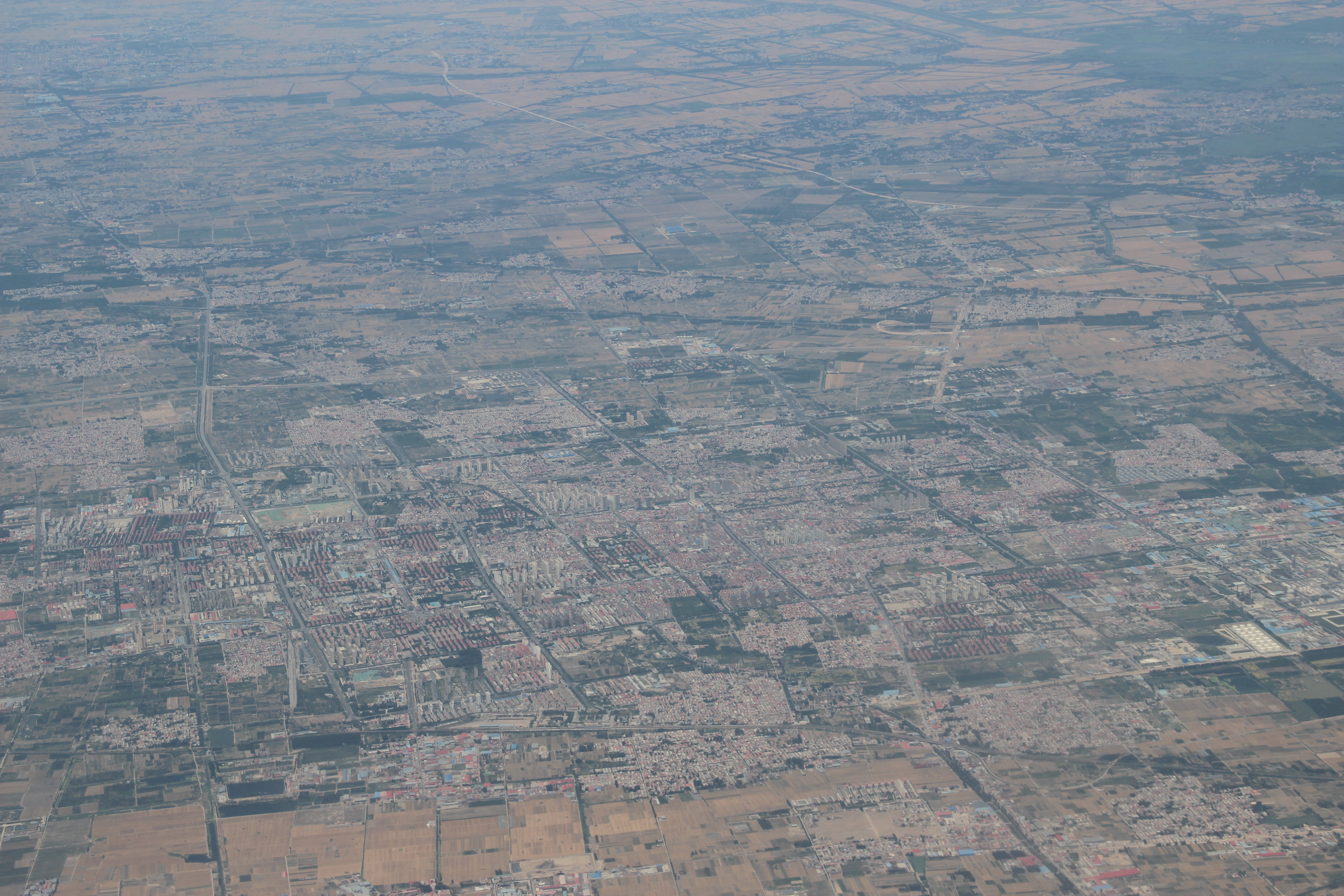
- Aerial view of Renqiu

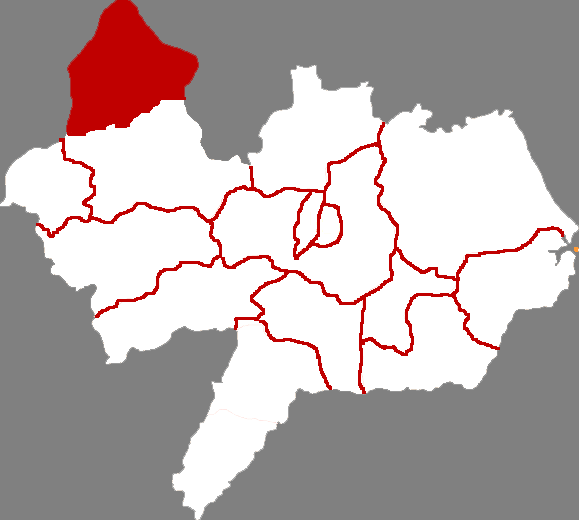
- Renqiu in Cangzhou

- Location of the city centre in Hebei
- Coordinates: 38°41′10″N 116°05′02″E
- Country: People's Republic of China
- Province: Hebei
- Prefecture-level city: Cangzhou

Area
  - County-level city: 1,012.0 km^{2} (390.7 sq mi)
  - Urban: 74.40 km^{2} (28.73 sq mi)

Population (2020 census)
  - County-level city: 816,401
  - Density: 806.72/km^{2} (2,089.4/sq mi)
  - Urban: 458,878
- Time zone: UTC+8 (China Standard Time)
- Postal code: 062500
- Area code: (0)317
- Website: http://www.hbrq.gov.cn

Renqiu (Chinese: 任丘; pinyin: Rénqiū) is a county-level city in Hebei province, China. It is located 79 kilometres (49 mi) northwest of the prefecture-level city of Cangzhou, which administers it, and 104 kilometres (65 mi) southwest of Tianjin. It is the location of North China Oil Field.

== Administrative divisions ==
Subdistricts:

- Xinhua Road Subdistrict (新华路街道), Xihuan Road Subdistrict (西环路街道), Yongfeng Road Subdistrict (永丰路街道)

Towns:

- Chu'an (出岸镇), Shimenqiao (石门桥镇), Lübaogong (吕公堡镇), Changfeng (长丰镇), Maozhou (鄚州镇), Gougezhuang (苟各庄镇), Liangzhao (梁召镇), Xinzhongyi (辛中驿镇)

Townships:

- Yilunbao Township (议论堡乡), Qingta Township (青塔乡), Beixinzhuang Township (北辛庄乡), Qijianfang Township (七间房乡), Beihan Township (北汉乡), Yucun Township (于村乡), Majiawu Township (麻家坞乡)

== Climate ==
Climate data for Renqiu, elevation 8 m (26 ft), (1991–2020 normals, extremes 1981–present)
| Month | Jan | Feb | Mar | Apr | May | Jun | Jul | Aug | Sep | Oct | Nov | Dec | Year |
|---|---|---|---|---|---|---|---|---|---|---|---|---|---|
| Record high °C (°F) | 15.9 (60.6) | 21.8 (71.2) | 30.8 (87.4) | 34.0 (93.2) | 38.5 (101.3) | 40.3 (104.5) | 40.9 (105.6) | 37.8 (100.0) | 35.2 (95.4) | 32.0 (89.6) | 23.7 (74.7) | 16.4 (61.5) | 40.9 (105.6) |
| Mean daily maximum °C (°F) | 2.5 (36.5) | 6.8 (44.2) | 14.0 (57.2) | 21.7 (71.1) | 27.7 (81.9) | 31.9 (89.4) | 32.4 (90.3) | 30.7 (87.3) | 27.0 (80.6) | 20.2 (68.4) | 10.9 (51.6) | 4.0 (39.2) | 19.2 (66.5) |
| Daily mean °C (°F) | −3.0 (26.6) | 0.9 (33.6) | 7.9 (46.2) | 15.4 (59.7) | 21.6 (70.9) | 26.0 (78.8) | 27.6 (81.7) | 26.1 (79.0) | 21.4 (70.5) | 14.2 (57.6) | 5.4 (41.7) | −1.2 (29.8) | 13.5 (56.3) |
| Mean daily minimum °C (°F) | −7.3 (18.9) | −3.8 (25.2) | 2.5 (36.5) | 9.5 (49.1) | 15.6 (60.1) | 20.6 (69.1) | 23.3 (73.9) | 22.2 (72.0) | 16.6 (61.9) | 9.2 (48.6) | 1.0 (33.8) | −5.1 (22.8) | 8.7 (47.7) |
| Record low °C (°F) | −19.6 (−3.3) | −15.9 (3.4) | −9.4 (15.1) | −1.3 (29.7) | 5.4 (41.7) | 10.2 (50.4) | 16.3 (61.3) | 14.4 (57.9) | 4.7 (40.5) | −3.6 (25.5) | −11.5 (11.3) | −18.2 (−0.8) | −19.6 (−3.3) |
| Average precipitation mm (inches) | 2.2 (0.09) | 5.4 (0.21) | 8.4 (0.33) | 22.4 (0.88) | 32.3 (1.27) | 60.4 (2.38) | 159.6 (6.28) | 116.5 (4.59) | 47.2 (1.86) | 26.5 (1.04) | 12.4 (0.49) | 2.4 (0.09) | 495.7 (19.51) |
| Average precipitation days (≥ 0.1 mm) | 1.4 | 1.8 | 2.7 | 4.3 | 5.6 | 7.8 | 11.2 | 9.7 | 6.2 | 4.7 | 3.2 | 1.6 | 60.2 |
| Average snowy days | 2.3 | 2.0 | 0.7 | 0.1 | 0 | 0 | 0 | 0 | 0 | 0 | 1.3 | 2.5 | 8.9 |
| Average relative humidity (%) | 55 | 50 | 46 | 49 | 52 | 58 | 71 | 75 | 68 | 63 | 63 | 58 | 59 |
| Mean monthly sunshine hours | 180.9 | 189.4 | 241.0 | 257.2 | 281.8 | 246.3 | 212.4 | 221.1 | 223.0 | 204.2 | 170.4 | 169.0 | 2,596.7 |
| Percentage possible sunshine | 59 | 62 | 65 | 65 | 64 | 56 | 47 | 53 | 61 | 60 | 57 | 58 | 59 |
Source: China Meteorological Administrationall-time August high

== Notable persons ==
- Ji Xiaocheng
