= Yucai School Attached to Sichuan Chengdu No.7 High School =

Public middle school in Chengdu, Sichuan, China

Coordinates: 30.6445°N 104.0876°E

- 四川省成都市七中育才学校
- Chengdu, China

Information
- Type: Public Middle School, Chengdu, Sichuan, China
- Motto: "Stand out from the crowd, a great talent under heaven" 卓尔不群，大器天下
- Established: 1997
- Headmistress: Mrs. Jun Zhang (张军)
- Faculty: 203
- Enrollment: About 3000 students (grades 7-9)
- Website: http://www.cdqzyc.com at the Wayback Machine (archived February 9, 2014)

The Yucai School Attached to Sichuan Chengdu No.7 High School (四川省成都市七中育才学校), commonly known as the Yucai Middle School, is a public middle school in Jinjiang, Chengdu, Sichuan, China, affiliated with Chengdu No.7 High School. Founded in 1997, the school is widely regarded as the best public middle school in Chengdu City and Sichuan Province.

In 1957, the growing city of Chengdu in Sichuan, China established No. 7 High School, the predecessor of today's Yucai. During the next forty years, the school expanded and altered its name, and was for a time known as Sichuan Chengdu No. 35 Middle School. With guidance from the Chengdu Education Bureau, the school was reorganized again in 1997 to keep pace with its rapidly developing environment. Today the school sits under the jurisdiction of the Chengdu Municipal Jinjiang District Education Bureau.

== Profile and reputation ==
Yucai Middle School educates boys and girls in the seventh, eighth, and ninth grades. Each grade holds approximately 1,000 students for a total enrollment of just over 3,000 students spread across 50 classrooms. Many of the 180 faculty have received local and national recognition for their teaching excellence: sixty-eight are considered “First-Tier” (一级教师); forty-eight are considered “Advanced” (高级教师); twelve have been recognized as “Excellent Young Teachers” (优秀青年教师); nine are trustees or core members of provincial and municipal education committees (省市教育学会理事及中心); five have been selected to be “Exemplary Academicians” (学科带头人); and two have merited “Top Level” (特级教师) classification.

Local, regional and national awards attest to Yucai's brand of excellence. Yucai has ranked first in Sichuan province both in number of student participants and also in awards won in national mathematics, physics, chemistry, and information science (信息学) contests.

Yucai has won much recognition at the city and provincial level. It is a “Superior School of Basic Educational Reform in Sichuan” (四川省基础教育课程改革先进单位) as well as an “Educational Well-Being and Psychological Counseling Research Center” (四川省心理健康教育研究基地学校). Its community support remains outstanding, as the school also received Sichuan's award for “Exemplary Parent Involvement” (四川省示范家长学校). In Chengdu it has received the “Exemplary School Spirit” (成都市校风示范校) and “Exemplary Campus Ethics and Civility” (成都文明单位) awards among more than ten other provincial and citywide honors. Yucai's influence extends beyond Chengdu and into rural China through its participation in supportive teaching programs. Multimedia technology broadcasts Yucai's model classrooms, along with those of Dongfang Wendao Network School, into more than a hundred remote schools in western China.

== International exchange ==
Every year, teachers, principals and students from the United States, Singapore, South Korea, Russia and other countries visit Yucai to exchange ideas about education and pedagogy. Yucai's teachers and students regularly participate in study abroad programs. Every year some students attend summer camps outside of China to increase their experience, knowledge, and abilities.
