= Taoyuan, Shijiazhuang =

Coordinates: 38°04′45″N 114°30′49″E

Taoyuan 桃园镇
- Town

Chinese transcription(s)
- Interactive map of Taoyuan
- Country: China
- Province: Hebei
- Prefecture: Shijiazhuang
- District: Qiaodong District
- Time zone: UTC+8 (China Standard Time)

Taoyuan (simplified Chinese: 桃园; traditional Chinese: 桃園; pinyin: Táoyuán) is a township-level division of Qiaodong District, Shijiazhuang, Hebei, China.

== See also ==
- List of township-level divisions of Hebei
