= Changfeng, Renqiu =

Changfeng 长丰镇
- Town
- Chángfēng Zhèn
- Location in Hebei Location in China
- Coordinates: 38°44′48″N 116°22′44″E
- Country: People's Republic of China
- Province: Hebei
- Prefecture-level city: Cangzhou
- County-level city: Renqiu

Area
  - Total: 79.48 km^{2} (30.69 sq mi)

Population (2010)
  - Total: 46,249
  - Density: 581.9/km^{2} (1,507/sq mi)
- Time zone: UTC+8 (China Standard)

Changfeng (Chinese: 长丰镇; pinyin: Chángfēng Zhèn) is a town located in Renqiu, Cangzhou, Hebei, China. According to the 2010 census, Changfeng had a population of 46,249, including 23,833 males and 22,416 females. The population was distributed as follows: 8,916 people aged under 14, 33,567 people aged between 15 and 64, and 3,766 people aged over 65.

== See also ==
- List of township-level divisions of Hebei
