= East Zhongshan Road Subdistrict, Shijiazhuang =

East Zhongshan Road Subdistrict 中山东路街道
- Subdistrict
- Location in Hebei
- Coordinates: 38°02′35″N 114°29′54″E
- Country: People's Republic of China
- Province: Hebei
- Prefecture-level city: Shijiazhuang
- District: Qiaodong
- Village-level divisions: 6 residential communities
- Elevation: 83 m (272 ft)
- Time zone: UTC+8 (China Standard)
- Area code: 0311

East Zhongshan Road Subdistrict (simplified Chinese: 中山东路街道; traditional Chinese: 中山東路街道; pinyin: Zhōngshān Dōng Lù Jiēdào) is a subdistrict and the seat of Qiaodong District, in the heart of Shijiazhuang, Hebei, People's Republic of China. As of 2011, it has 6 residential communities (居委会) under its administration.

== See also ==
- List of township-level divisions of Hebei
