= S82 =

S82 may refer to:

== Automobiles ==
- Daihatsu Hijet (S82), a kei truck and microvan
- Stola S82 Spyder, a concept car
- Scania S82, a Scania bus

== Other uses ==
- Blériot-SPAD S.82, a French advertising biplane
- S82 Zhengzhou–Minquan Expressway, expressway in Henan, China
- S82, a line of the St. Gallen S-Bahn
