= Luowang =

Luowang may refer to the following locations in China:

- Luowang Township (罗王乡), a township of Kaifeng County, Henan.
- Luowang, Yueyang (洛王街道), a subdistrict of Yueyanglou District, Yueyang, Hunan.
