= Chengguan, Kaifeng County =

Chengguan 城关镇
- Town

Chinese transcription(s)
- Location in Henan
- Coordinates: 34°45′18″N 114°25′02″E
- Country: China
- Province: Henan
- Prefecture: Kaifeng
- County: Kaifeng County
- Time zone: UTC+8 (China Standard Time)

Chengguan (Chinese: 城关镇; pinyin: Chéngguān Zhèn) is a town situated in Kaifeng County, Kaifeng in the province of Henan, China.

== See also ==
- List of township-level divisions of Henan
