= Liudian Township =

Liudian Township may refer to:

- Liudian Township, Kaifeng County, in Henan, China
- Liudian Township, Yucheng County, in Yucheng County, Henan, China
