= Xijiangzhai Township =

Coordinates: 34.62818°N 114.21746°E

Xijiangzhai Township 西姜寨乡
- Township

Chinese transcription(s)
- Interactive map of Xijiangzhai Township
- Country: China
- Province: Henan
- Prefecture: Kaifeng
- County: Kaifeng County
- Time zone: UTC+8 (China Standard Time)

Xijiangzhai Township (Chinese: 西姜寨乡; pinyin: Xījiāngzhài Xiāng) is a township situated in Kaifeng County, Kaifeng in the province of Henan, China.

== See also ==
- List of township-level divisions of Henan
