= Duliang Township =

Coordinates: 34.80926°N 114.55713°E

Duliang Township 杜良乡
- Township

Chinese transcription(s)
- Interactive map of Duliang Township
- Country: China
- Province: Henan
- Prefecture: Kaifeng
- County: Kaifeng County
- Time zone: UTC+8 (China Standard Time)

Duliang Township (Chinese: 杜良乡; pinyin: Dùliáng Xiāng) is a township situated in Kaifeng County, Kaifeng in the province of Henan, China.

== See also ==
- List of township-level divisions of Henan
