= Quxing =

Coordinates: 34.83462°N 114.67545°E

Quxing 曲兴镇
- Town

Chinese transcription(s)
- Interactive map of Quxing
- Country: China
- Province: Henan
- Prefecture: Kaifeng
- County: Kaifeng County
- Time zone: UTC+8 (China Standard Time)

Quxing (Chinese: 曲兴镇; pinyin: Qǔxīng Zhèn) is a town situated in Kaifeng County, Kaifeng in the province of Henan, China.

== See also ==
- List of township-level divisions of Henan
