= Fancun =

Fancun may refer to these places in China:

- Fancun Township (范村乡), a township in Kaifeng, Henan
- Fancun, Hejin (樊村), a town in Hejin, Shanxi
- Fancun, Taigu County (范村), a town in Taigu County, Shanxi
