= Baliwan =

Baliwan may refer to:

- Baliwan, Henan, town in Kaifeng, Henan, China
- Baliwan, town in Hong'an County, Hubei, China
