= Xinglong Township, Henan =

Coordinates: 34.77346°N 114.51°E

Xinglong Township 兴隆乡
- Township

Chinese transcription(s)
- Interactive map of Xinglong Township
- Country: China
- Province: Henan
- Prefecture: Kaifeng
- County: Kaifeng County
- Time zone: UTC+8 (China Standard Time)

Xinglong Township (Chinese: 兴隆乡; pinyin: Xīnglóng Xiāng) is a township situated in the Kaifeng County, Kaifeng in the province of Henan, China.

== See also ==
- List of township-level divisions of Henan
