= Dragon Pavilion =

Song dynasty palace in Henan, China

Coordinates: 34.809469°N 114.346647°E

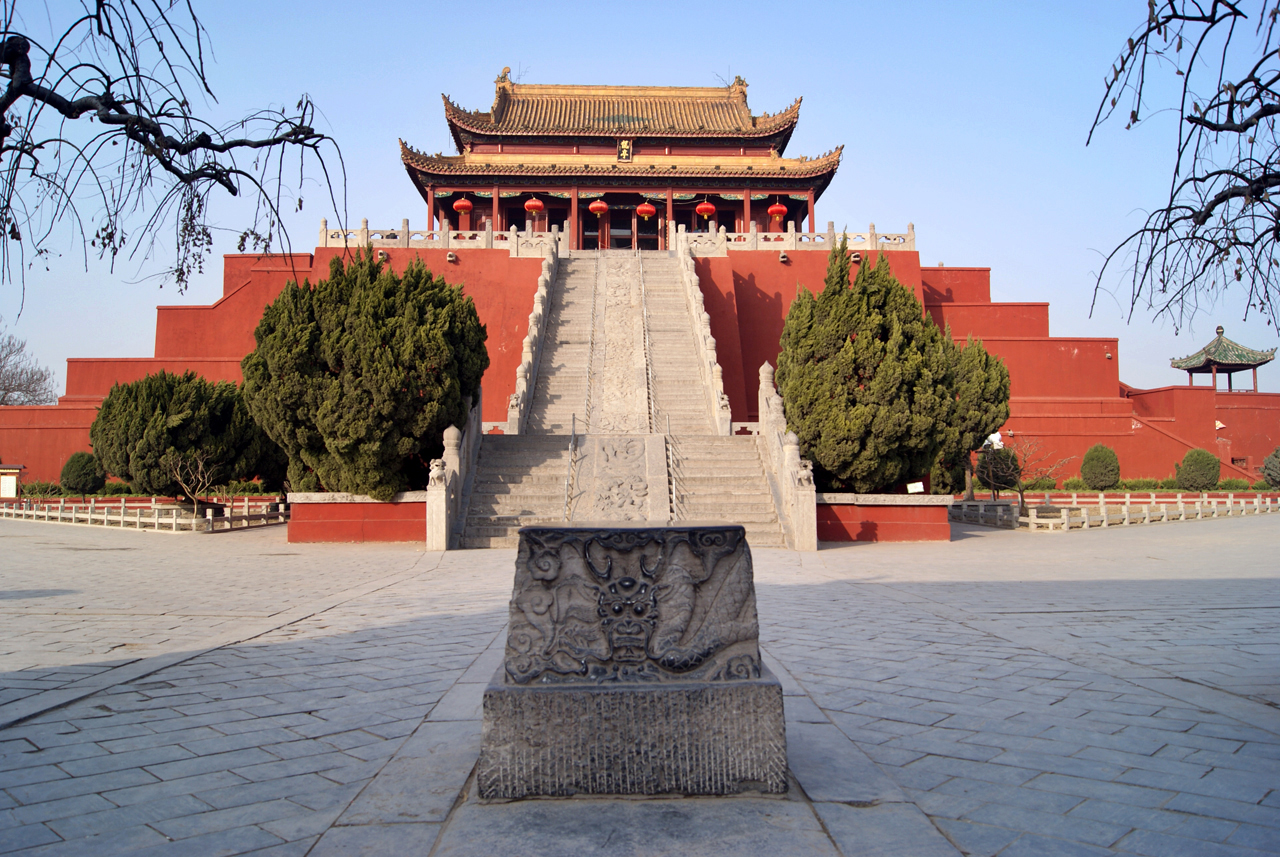
Dragon Pavilion

The Dragon Pavilion (simplified Chinese: 龙亭; traditional Chinese: 龍亭; pinyin: lóngtíng) or Wanshou pavilion is located in Kaifeng in the eastern part of Henan province, People's Republic of China. During the Northern Song (960–1127) and Jin (1115–1234) dynasties, Kaifeng was an imperial capital city. The imperial palace of that time is largely lost to time, but a few parts, such as the Dragon Pavilion, remain visible today.

== History ==
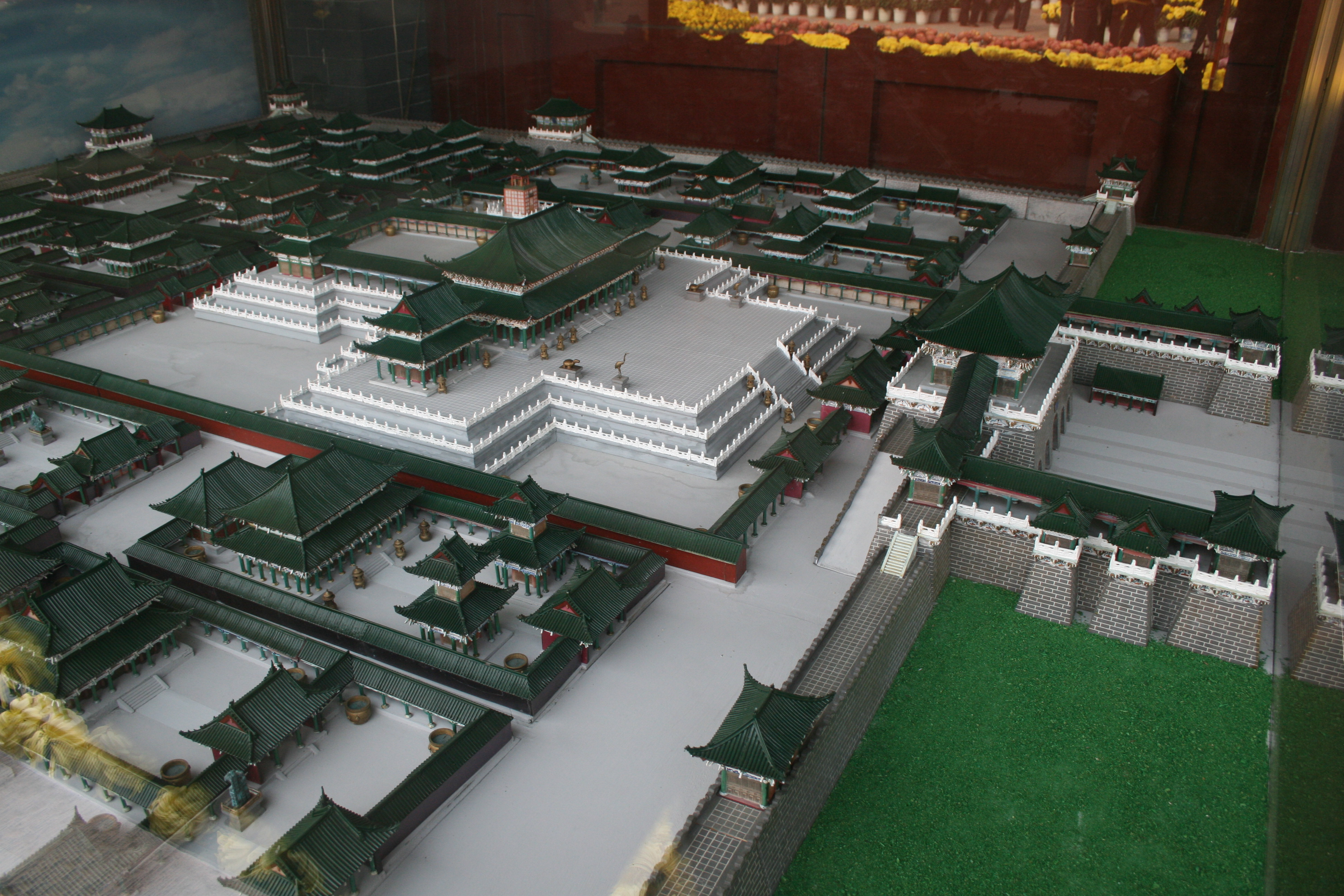
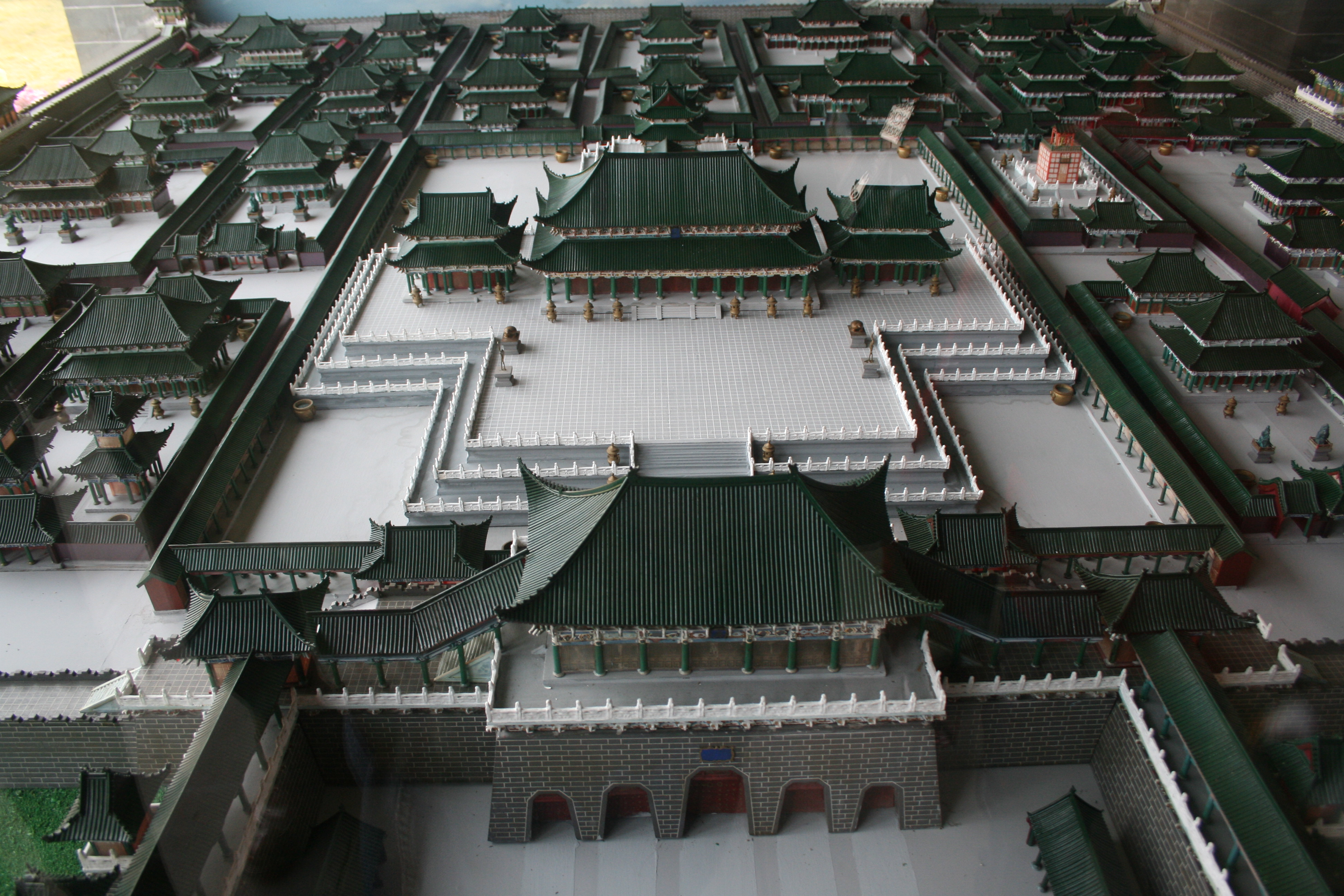
Model diorama of Dragon Palace.

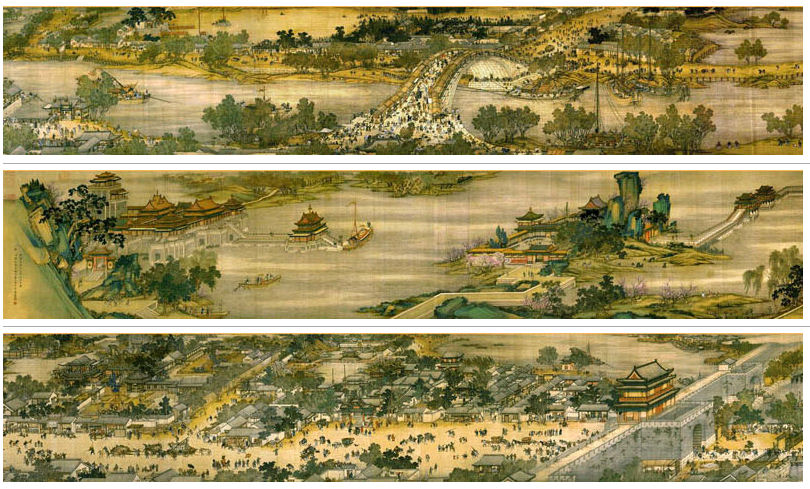
The famous painting Qingming Scroll is believed by some to portray life in Kaifeng on a Qingming Festival day. The painting, of which several versions are extant (the above is an 18th-century copy), is attributed to the Song dynasty (960–1279) artist Zhang Zeduan.

Kaifeng became the capital of the Northern Song dynasty in 960. An imperial place was built here and the city prospered, perhaps with a population reaching over 400,000. During that time the city took the name Dongjing (literally: Eastern Capital) or Bianjing.

The city of that time is thought to be depicted on the famous painting Along the River During Qingming Festival. The painting by the artist Zhang Zeduan shows a typical Qingming Festival scene. The city of that time is also integral to the famous writing, Dongjing Meng Hua Lu (Dreams of Splendour of the Eastern Capital).

The Jurchen-led Jin dynasty captured Kaifeng in 1127 and made the city their southern capital sometime between 1157 and 1161. The city under Jin rule was considerably smaller than it had been under the Song. The Jurchens kept their main capital further north until 1214 when they were forced to move the imperial court southwards to Kaifeng in order to flee from the Mongol onslaught. Under Yuan and Ming rule, Kaifeng ceased to be an imperial capital, relegated to the level of provincial capital.

The Dragon Pavilion or Wanshou Pavilion was one of the buildings of the Song imperial palace. It was destroyed and rebuilt many times throughout its long history. The current design was first built during the reign of the Kangxi Emperor during the Qing dynasty on the foundations of the old Song imperial palace. It was destroyed several times by strong storms and wars. A news magazine article from 1948 describes the Dragon Pavilion as burned during the Chinese Civil War. Heavy rainstorms and a lightning strike cause the pavilion to collapse in 1994. After each disaster, the building has been reconstructed again.

== Structure ==
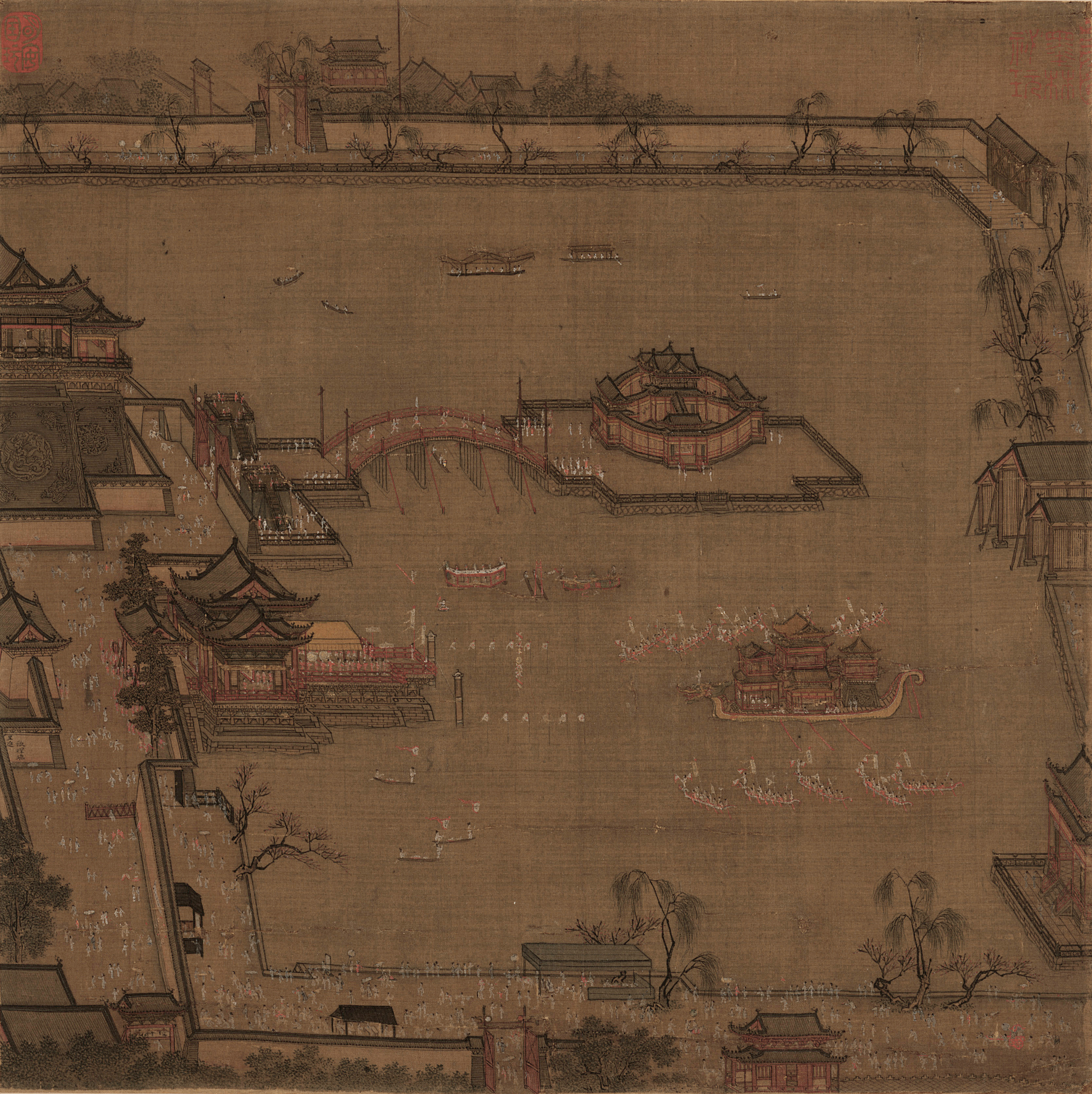
Games in the Jinming Pool, an early 12th-century painting depicting Kaifeng, by Zhang Zeduan.

Most of the old imperial palace structures have gone today. The Dragon Pavilion remains standing within the Longting park. The Pavilion is a grand hall built on a 13-meter (43-foot) blue brick terrace. Some 72 steps lead up to the entrance. The pavilion building is a wooden structure. It has a southern aspect with the dimensions of 19.10 meters (62.7 feet) from east to west, 11.90 meters (39.0 feet) from south to north, and 26.7 meters (88 feet) in height.

The Song Capital Street (Song Du Yu Jie) is a restored road made to look like these scene in the Qingming Scroll. It is about 400 metres long and runs southwards from entrance of Longting park. The road is lined with two story wooden buildings with tile roofs made to look like authentic Song dynasty architecture. Archeological excavation below the modern road found the remains of the old Song dynasty imperial way.

== Gallery ==
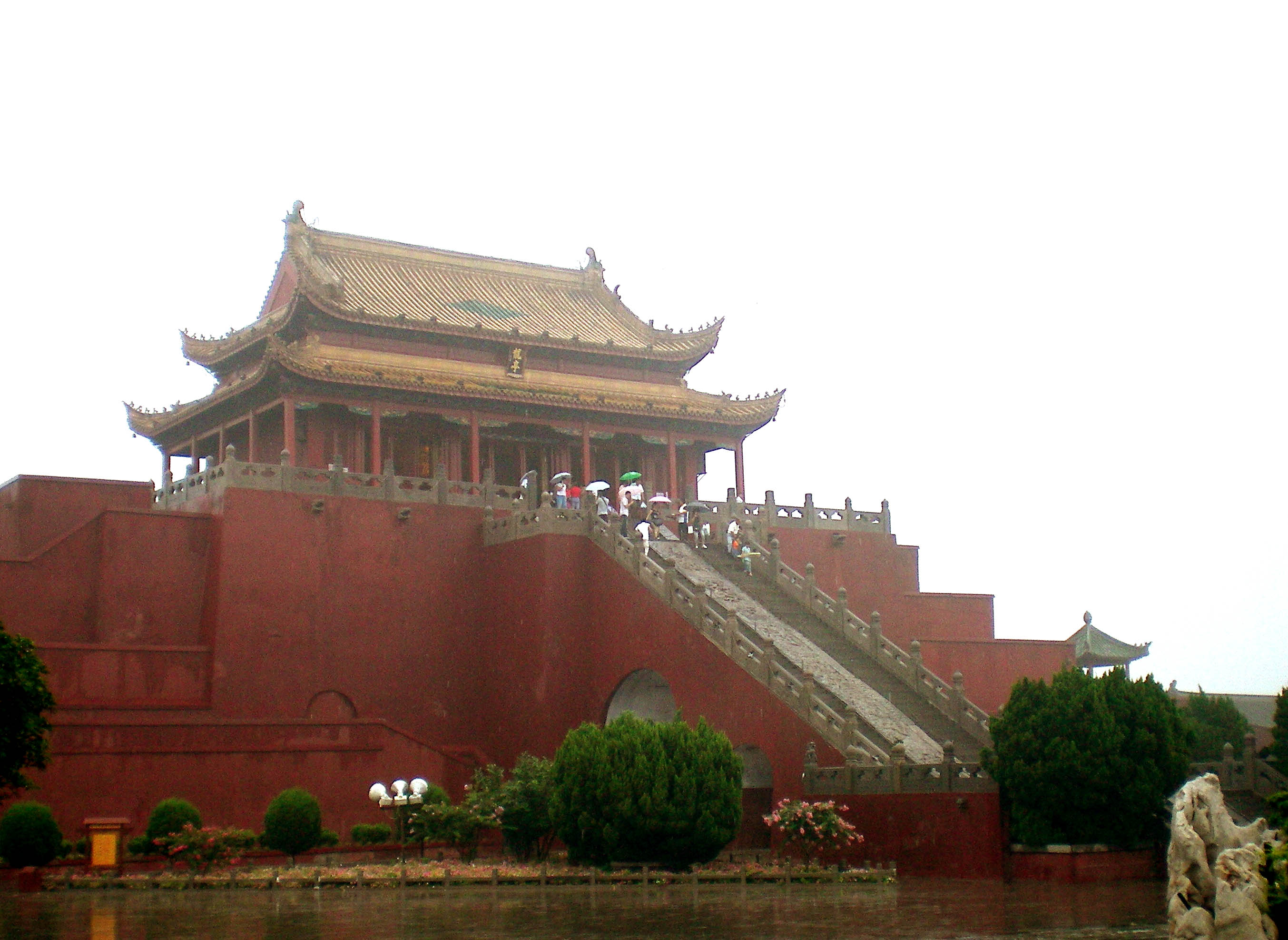

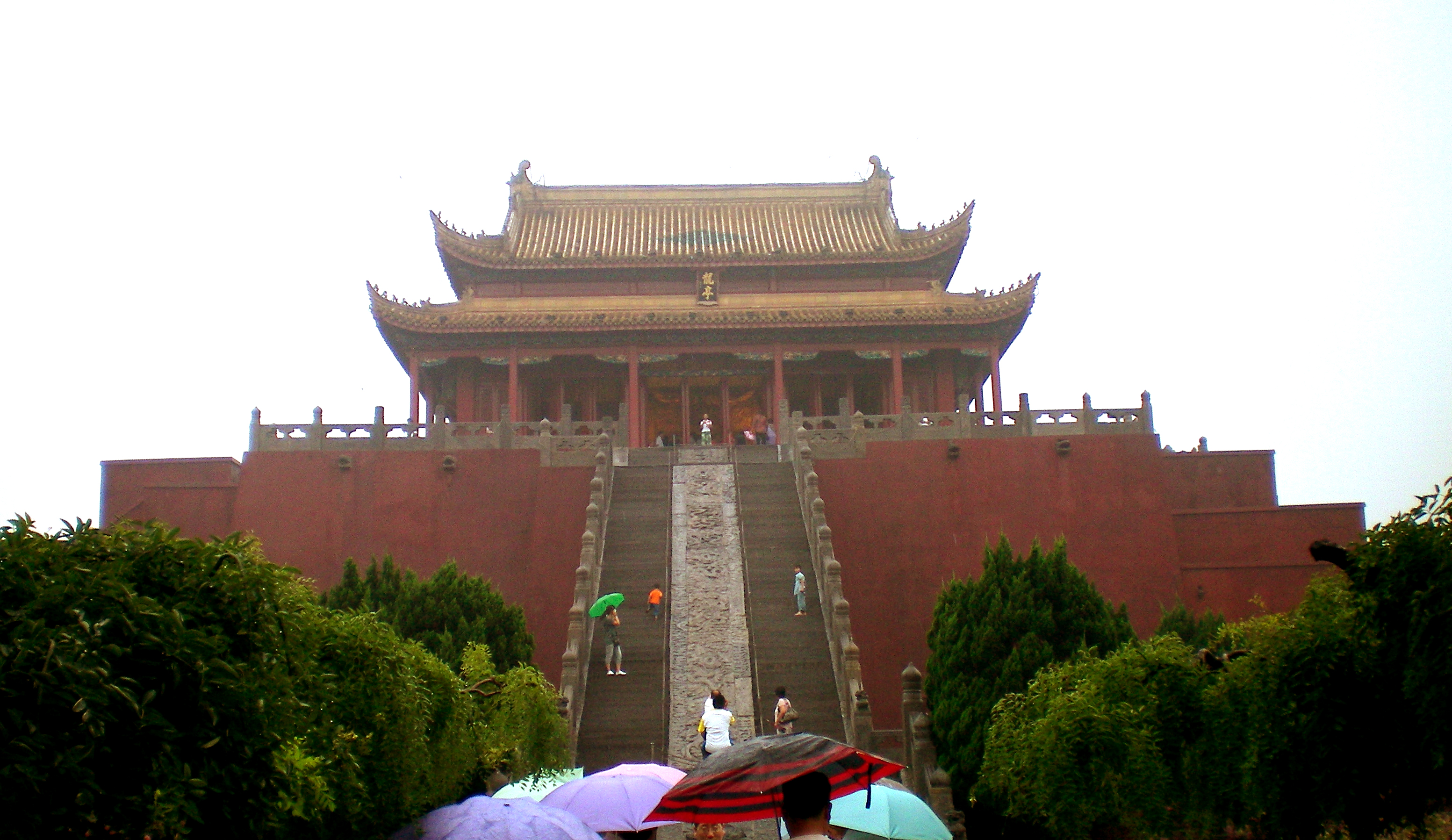

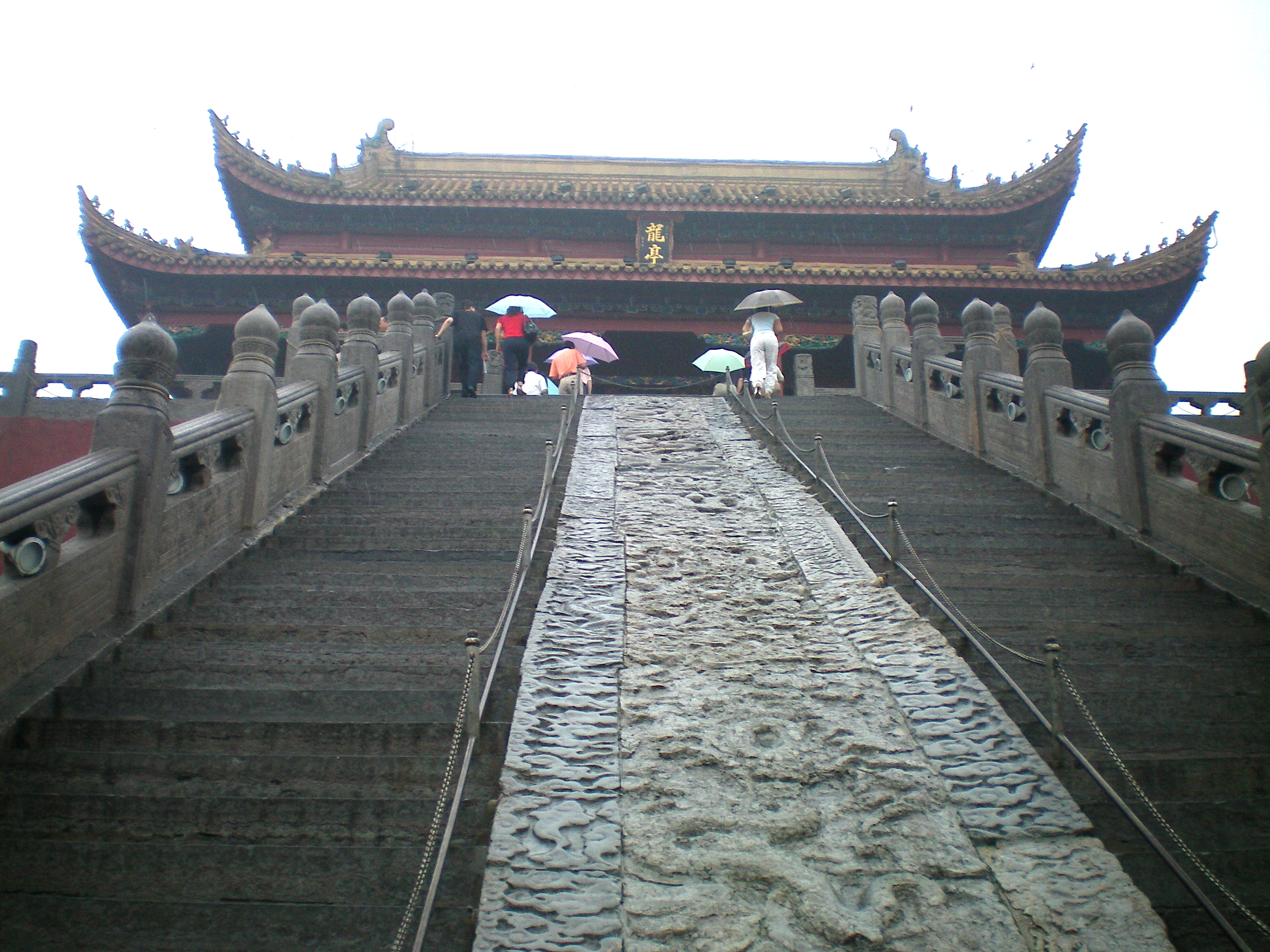

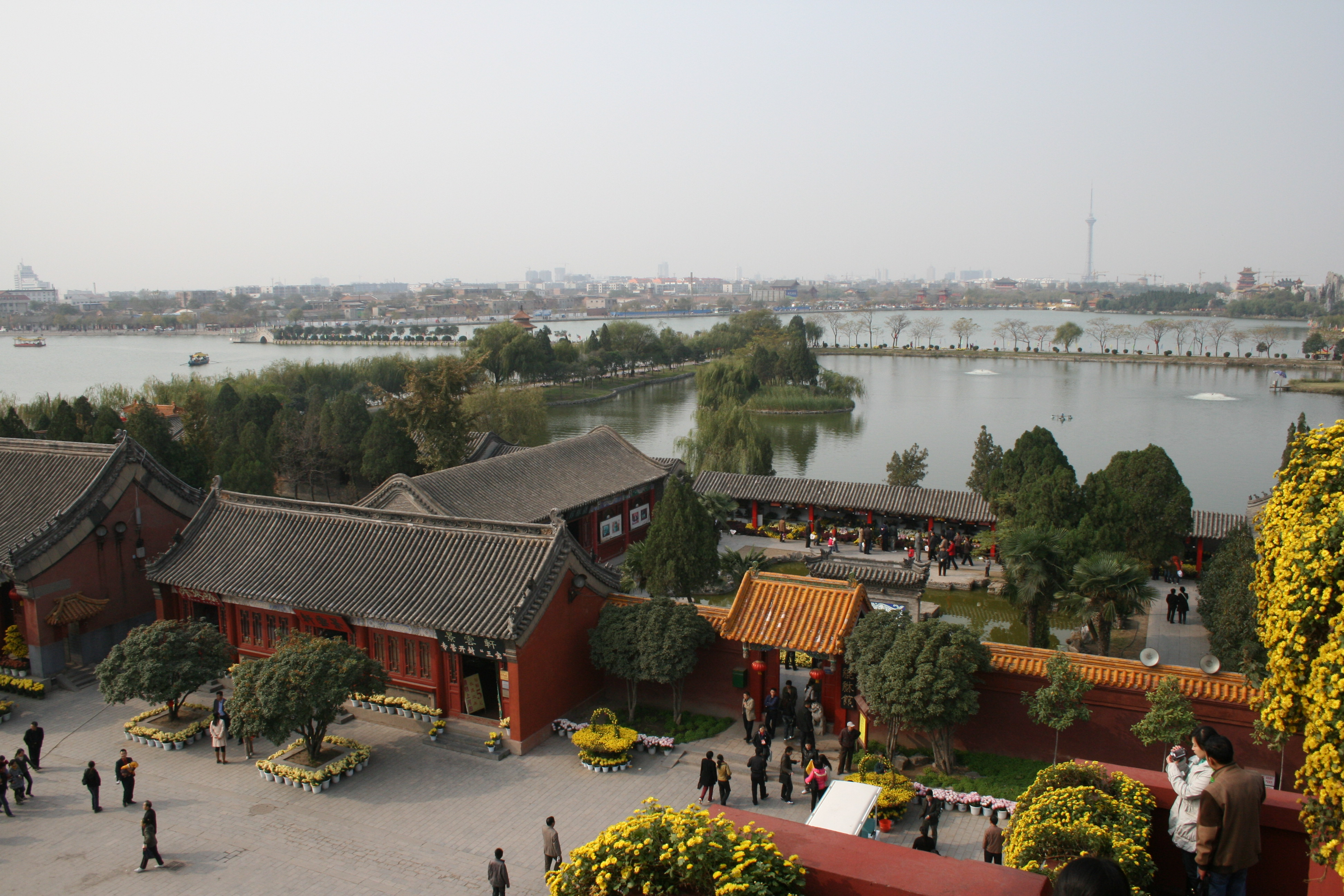
