= Fancun Township =

Coordinates: 34.68119°N 114.40047°E

Fancun Township 范村乡
- Township

Chinese transcription(s)
- Interactive map of Fancun Township
- Country: China
- Province: Henan
- Prefecture: Kaifeng
- County: Kaifeng County
- Time zone: UTC+8 (China Standard Time)

Fancun Township (Chinese: 范村乡) is a township situated in Kaifeng County, Kaifeng in the province of Henan, China.

== See also ==
- List of township-level divisions of Henan
