= Baliwan, Henan =

Coordinates: 34.74911°N 114.57856°E

Baliwan 八里湾
- Town

Chinese transcription(s)
- Interactive map of Baliwan
- Country: China
- Province: Henan
- Prefecture: Kaifeng
- County: Kaifeng County
- Time zone: UTC+8 (China Standard Time)

Baliwan (Chinese: 八里湾; pinyin: Bālǐwān) is a town situated in Kaifeng County, Kaifeng in the province of Henan, China.

== See also ==
- List of township-level divisions of Henan
