= S82 Zhengzhou–Minquan Expressway =

Expressway in Henan, China

Zhengzhou–Minquan Expressway
- Zhengmin Expressway 郑民高速公路
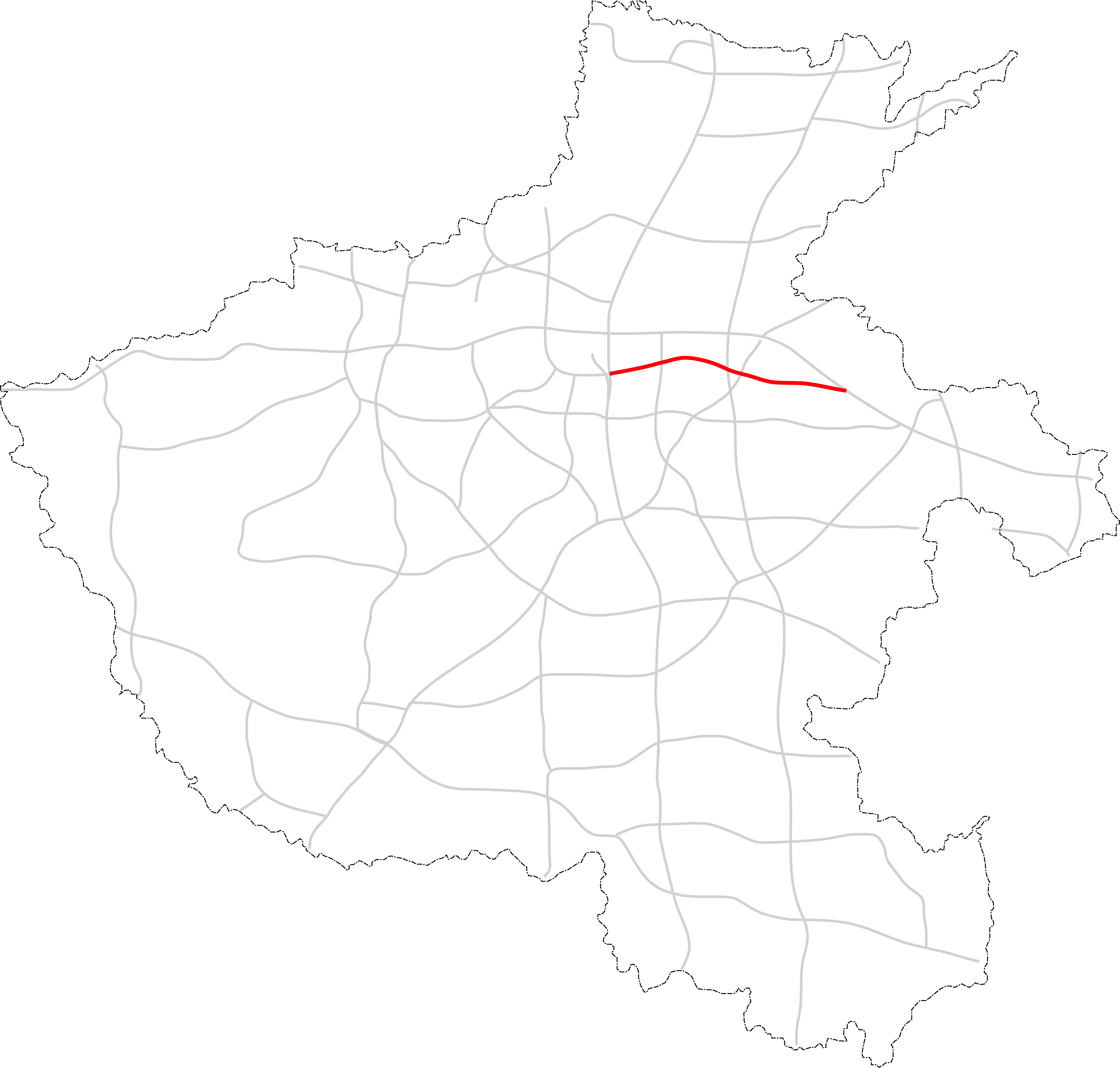

Route information
- Length: 120.6 km (74.9 mi)
- Existed: 2011–present

Major junctions
- West end: G4 in Zhongmu, Zhengzhou, Henan
- Henan S89 in Zhongmu, Zhengzhou, Henan (under construction); G45 in Xiangfu District, Kaifeng, Henan; Henan S83 in Xiangfu District, Kaifeng, Henan
- East end: G30 in Minquan, Shangqiu, Henan

Location
- Country: China
- Province: Henan

Highway system
- Transport in China

The Zhengzhou–Minquan Expressway (Chinese: 郑州－民权高速公路), often referred to as Zhengmin Expressway (Chinese: 郑民高速) and designated as S82 in Henan's expressway system, is 120.6-kilometre (74.9 mi) long regional expressway in Henan, China. The expressway connects Zhengzhou and Minquan County.

== History ==
The first phase of the expressway, which is from Zhengzhou to Kaifeng, was opened on 29 December 2011. This section provides a fast connection to Zhengzhou Xinzheng International Airport for Kaifeng. The second phase is from Kaifeng to Minquan, and was opened on 26 September 2016.

The expressway was built with reserved conditions for military aircraft to land and take-off during war time. Such drills had been performed on the expressway in 2014.

== Exit list ==
Location	km	mi	Exit	Name	Destinations	Notes
Henan S82 (Zhengzhou–Minquan Expressway)
Continues west as G3001
Zhongmu County, Zhengzhou				Xiangyunsi Interchange	G4 / G3001 – Zhengdong New Area, Xinzheng, Xuchang, other destinations in Zhengzhou	
Zhongmu County, Zhengzhou			8	Zheng'an	G107 (Wansan Road) – Zheng'an Town	
Zhongmu County, Zhengzhou	South Zhongmu Service Area					
Zhongmu County, Zhengzhou			18	Yaojia	Henan S223 – Zhongmu, Yaojia Town	
Zhongmu County, Zhengzhou				Henan S89		Under construction
Longting District, Kaifeng	Jinming Service Area					
Longting District, Kaifeng			37	Xinghuaying	Kaigang Avenue – Xinghuaying Town	
Gulou District, Kaifeng			45	Nanyuan	Jinming Avenue – Downtown Kaifeng	
Xiangfu District, Kaifeng	South Kaifeng Service Area (under construction)					
Xiangfu District, Kaifeng			64	Chenliu Interchange	G45 – Puyang, Zhoukou	No eastbound entrance from northbound G45 or westbound exit to southbound G45
Xiangfu District, Kaifeng			71	Henan S83 – Lankao, Heze, Xuchang		
Qixian, Kaifeng				Qixian	Qixian	
Qixian, Kaifeng	Qixian Service Area					
Minquan, Shangqiu				Baiyunsi	X058 – Yindian Township, Baiyun Temple	
Minquan, Shangqiu				Minquan Interchange	G30 – Kaifeng, Minquan, Shangqiu	
Closed/former; Concurrency terminus; HOV only; Incomplete access; Tolled; Route transition; Unopened
