= Luowang Township =

Township of Kaifeng, China

Luowang Township 罗王乡
- Township

Chinese transcription(s)
- Location in Henan
- Coordinates: 34°47′42″N 114°41′10″E
- Country: China
- Province: Henan
- Prefecture: Kaifeng
- County: Xiangfu, Kaifeng
- Time zone: UTC+8

Luowang Township (Chinese: 罗王乡; pinyin: Luówáng Xiāng) is a township in the Kaifeng County, Kaifeng in the province of Henan, China.

== See also ==
- List of township-level divisions of Henan
