= Chenliu =

Coordinates: 34.67102°N 114.52907°E

Chenliu 陈留镇
- Town

Chinese transcription(s)
- Interactive map of Chenliu
- Country: China
- Province: Henan
- Prefecture: Kaifeng
- County: Kaifeng County
- Time zone: UTC+8 (China Standard Time)

Chenliu (simplified Chinese: 陈留镇; traditional Chinese: 陳留鎮; pinyin: Chénliú Zhèn) is a town situated in Kaifeng County, Kaifeng in the province of Henan, China.

== See also ==
- List of township-level divisions of Henan
