= Zhuxian, Henan =

Zhuxian 朱仙镇
- Town
- Location in Henan
- Coordinates: 34°36′55″N 114°16′02″E
- Country: People's Republic of China
- Province: Henan
- Prefecture-level city: Kaifeng
- District: Xiangfu

Area
  - Total: 71.7 km^{2} (27.7 sq mi)

Population
  - Total: 28,000
  - Density: 390/km^{2} (1,000/sq mi)
- Time zone: UTC+8 (China Standard)

Zhūxiān (Chinese: 朱仙) is a town located at the southwest of the city of Kaifeng in eastern Henan province, People's Republic of China. It is under the administration of Xiangfu District. The Gulu River runs through the town. In ancient times, the river was a large tributary of the Huai River, and one could reach Yangzhou of Jiangsu via the waterways. From the Tang dynasty to Republican China, the town was in an important strategic position for land and riverborne communications. During the Southern Song dynasty, general Yue Fei won an important battle against the Jin at nearby Yancheng and advanced to Zhuxian. Along with Foshan, Jingde, and Hankou, Zhuxian is regarded as one of the "four ancient towns of Qing dynasty China". In 2007, Zhuxian was included in the list of 10 most beautiful village-towns in China.
