= Liudian Township, Kaifeng County =

Coordinates: 34.86943°N 114.61394°E

Liudian Township 刘店乡
- Township

Chinese transcription(s)
- Interactive map of Liudian Township
- Country: China
- Province: Henan
- Prefecture: Kaifeng
- County: Kaifeng County
- Time zone: UTC+8 (China Standard Time)

Liudian Township (Chinese: 刘店乡; pinyin: Liúdiàn Xiāng) is a township situated in the Kaifeng County, Kaifeng in the province of Henan, China.

== See also ==
- List of township-level divisions of Henan
