= Blériot-SPAD S.82 =

1920s French aircraft

SPAD S.82

General information
- Type: Advertising aircraft
- National origin: France
- Manufacturer: SPAD
- Number built: 1

History
- First flight: 12 November 1926

The Bleriot-SPAD S.82 was a French advertising aircraft built in the late 1920s.

== Design ==
The S.82 was a biplane with a monocoque fuselage of wood and canvas construction. It was built to tow billboards in the air.

== Specifications ==
Data from

General characteristics

- Crew: one
- Length: 7.80 m (25 ft 7 in)
- Wingspan: 13.01 m (42 ft 8 in)
- Height: 3.02 m (9 ft 11 in)
- Powerplant: 1 × Hispano-Suiza 8Ab V-8 water-cooled piston engine, 130 kW (180 hp)
- Propellers: 2-bladed fixed pitchpropeller

Performance
