= Xiangfu, Kaifeng =

Xiangfu 祥符区
- District
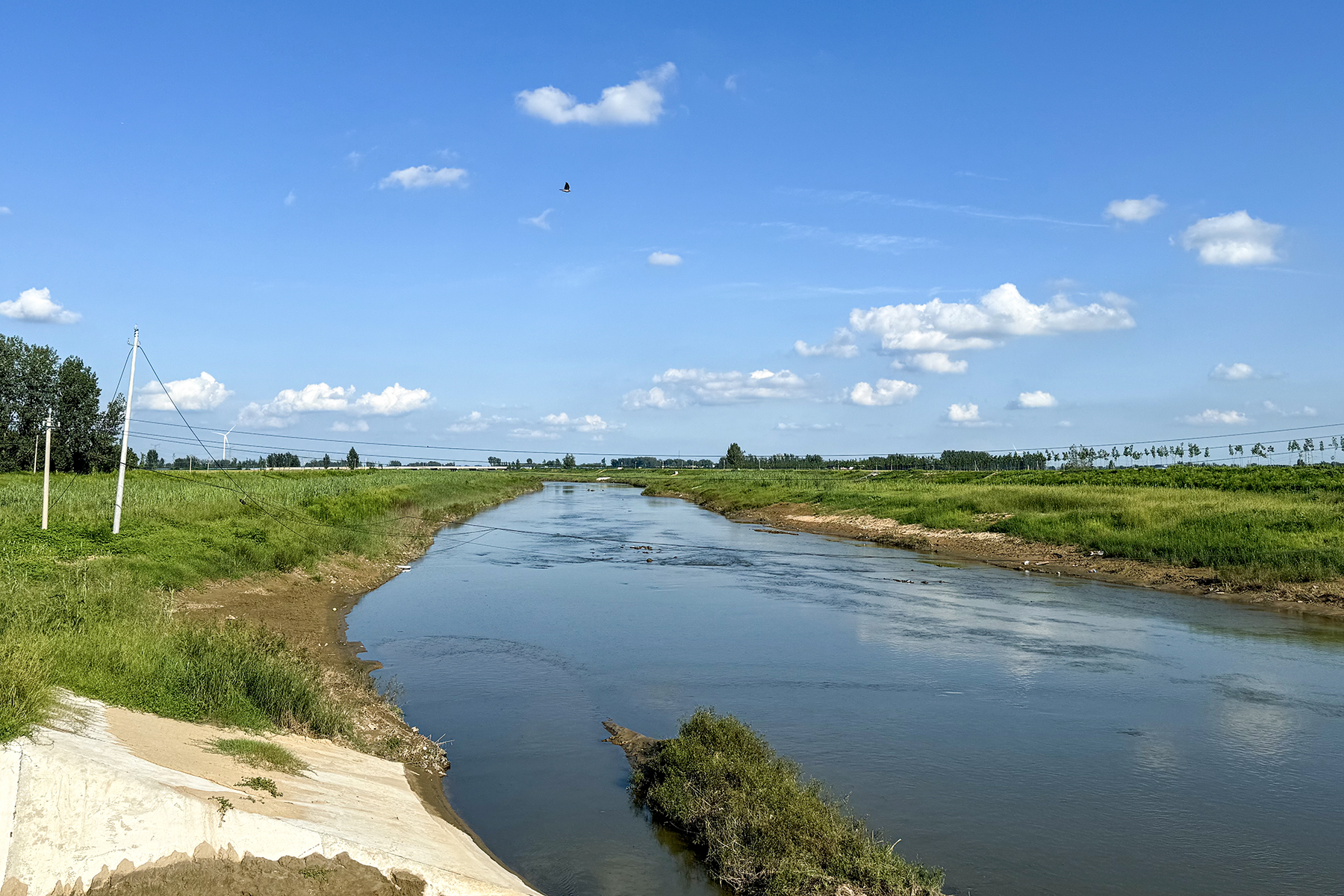

- Location in Henan Xiangfu (China)
- Coordinates: 34°44′54″N 114°27′19″E
- Country: People's Republic of China
- Province: Henan
- Prefecture-level city: Kaifeng

Area
  - Total: 1,302 km^{2} (503 sq mi)

Population (2019)
  - Total: 667,800
  - Density: 512.9/km^{2} (1,328/sq mi)
- Time zone: UTC+8 (China Standard)
- Postal code: 475100

Xiangfu District (Chinese: 祥符区; pinyin: Xiángfú Qū), formerly Kaifeng County, is a district of the city of Kaifeng, Henan, China.

== Administrative divisions ==
As of 2012, this district is divided to 6 towns and 9 townships.

Towns

- Baliwan (八里湾镇)
- Chengguan (城关镇)
- Chenliu (陈留镇)
- Qiulou (仇楼镇)
- Quxing (曲兴镇)
- Zhuxian (朱仙镇)

Townships

- Banpodian Township (半坡店乡)
- Duliang Township (杜良乡)
- Fancun Township (范村乡)
- Liudian Township (刘店乡)
- Luowang Township (罗王乡)
- Wanlong Township (万隆乡)
- Xijiangzhai Township (西姜寨乡)
- Xinglong Township (兴隆乡)
- Yuanfang Township (袁坊乡)
