= Kaifeng =

City in Henan, China

Kaifeng 开封市
- Prefecture-level city
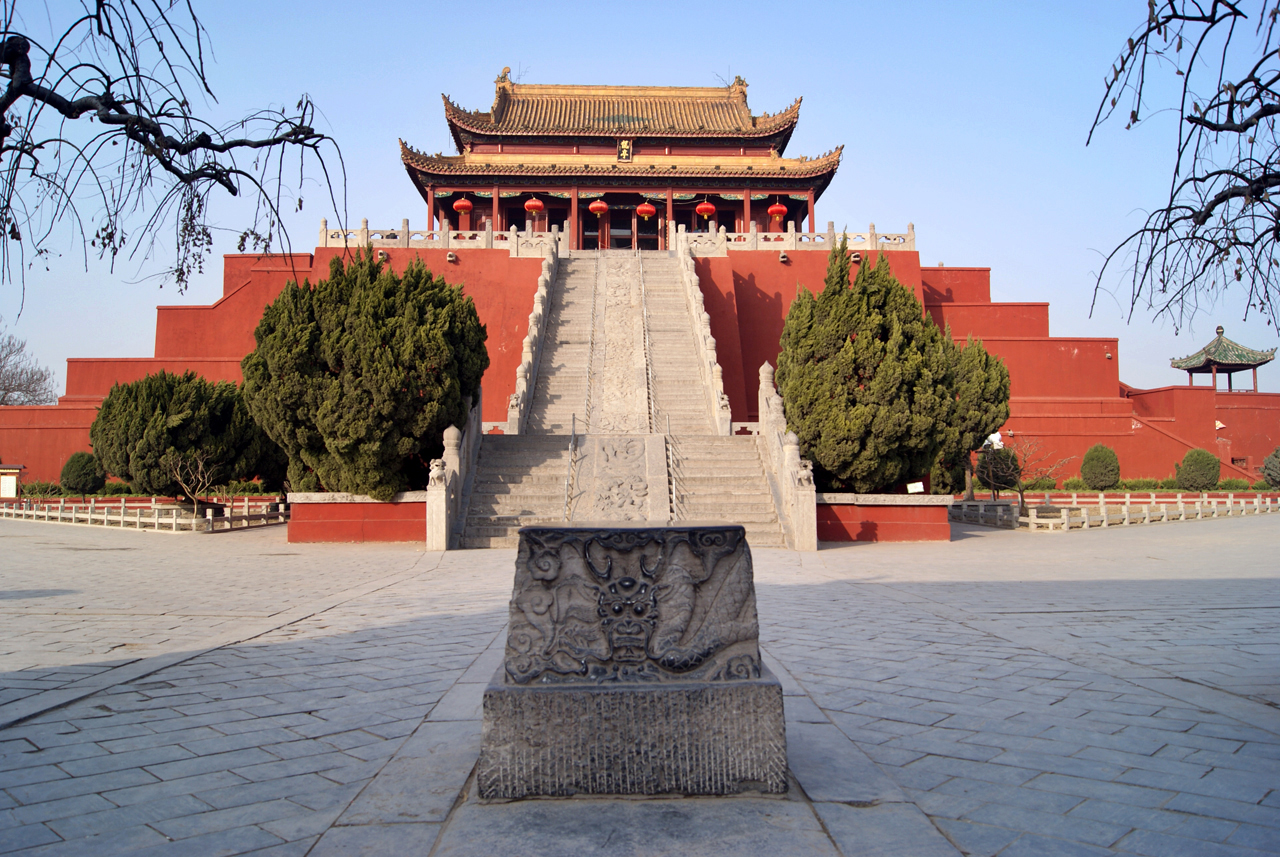
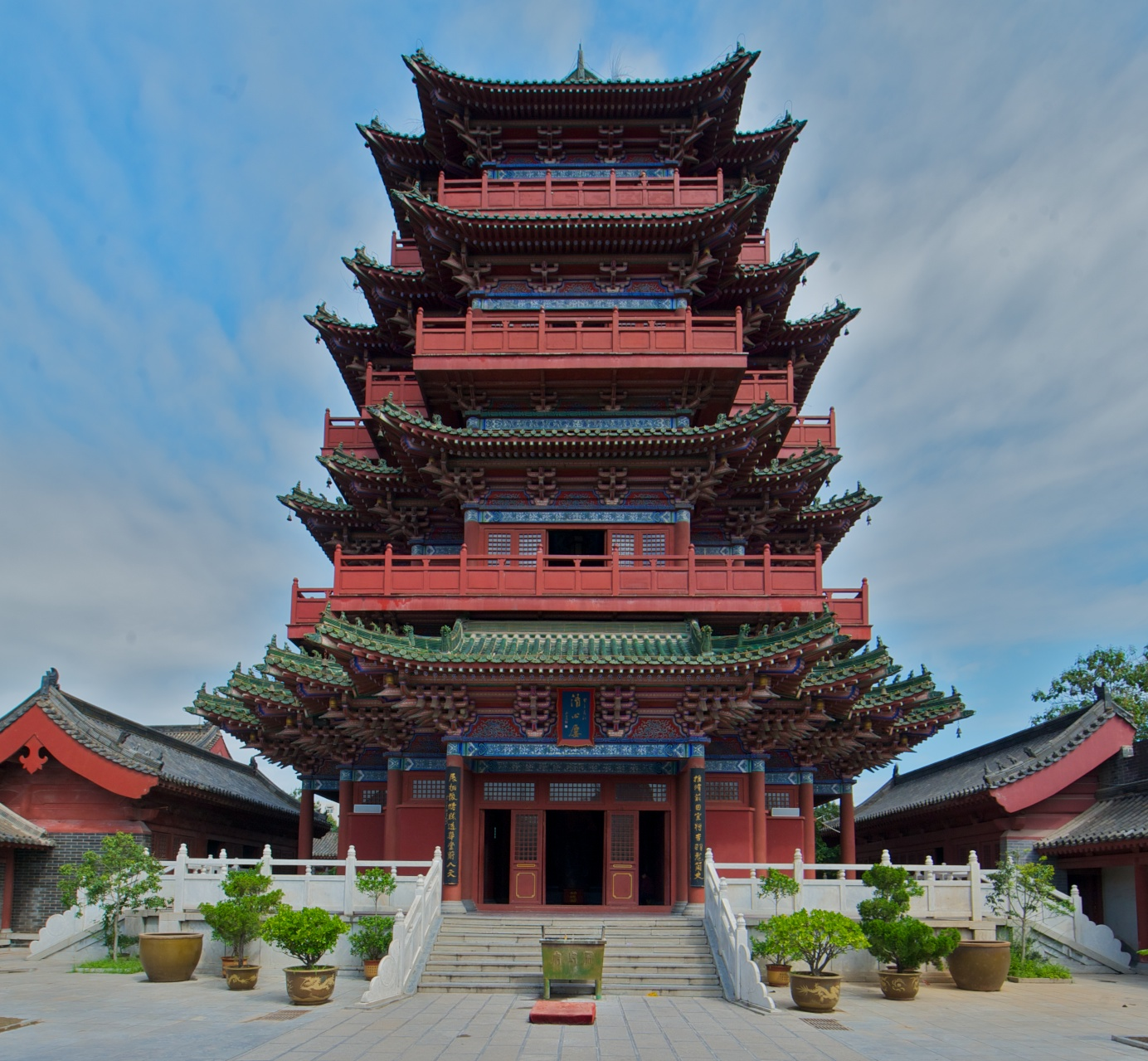
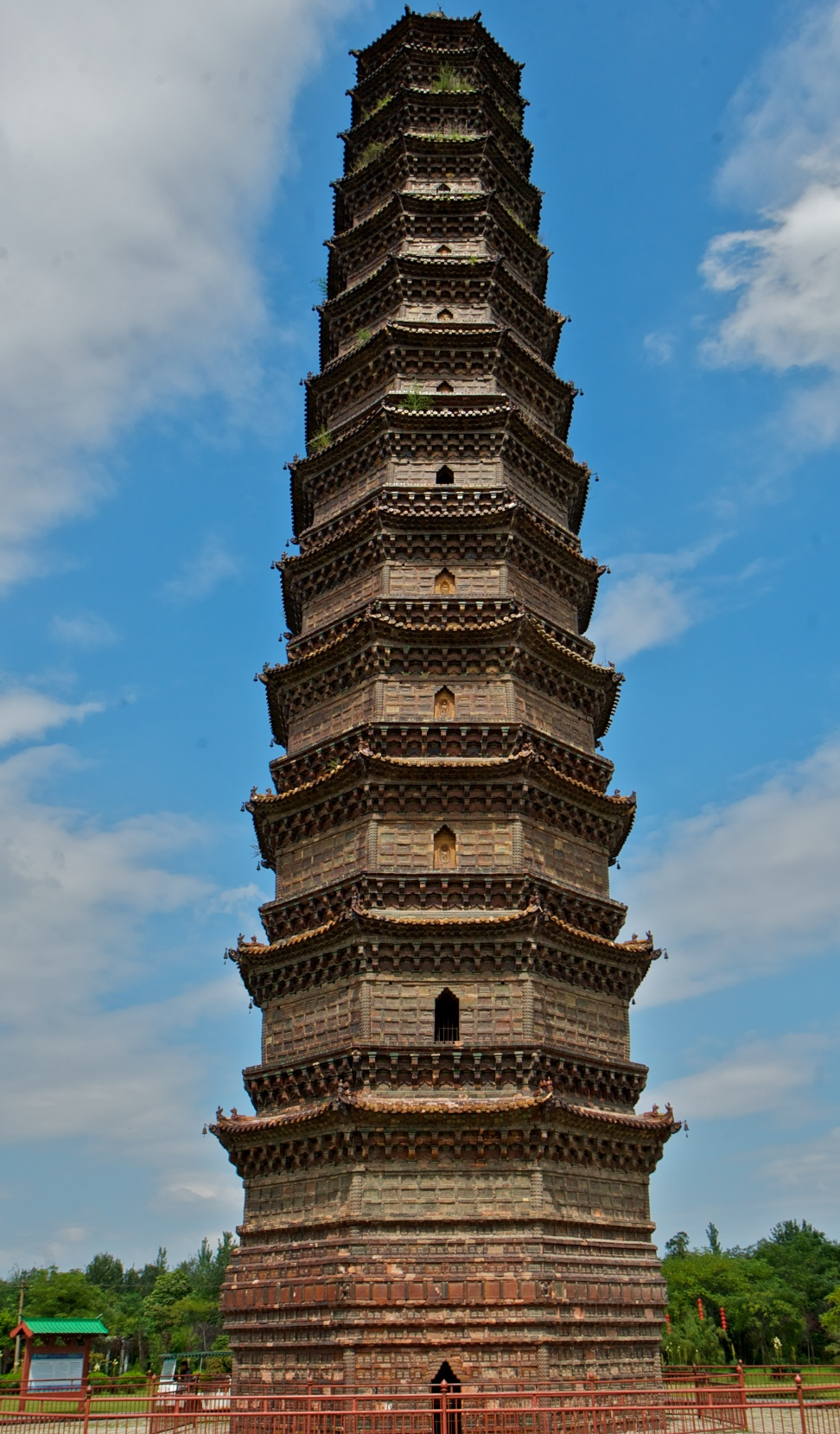
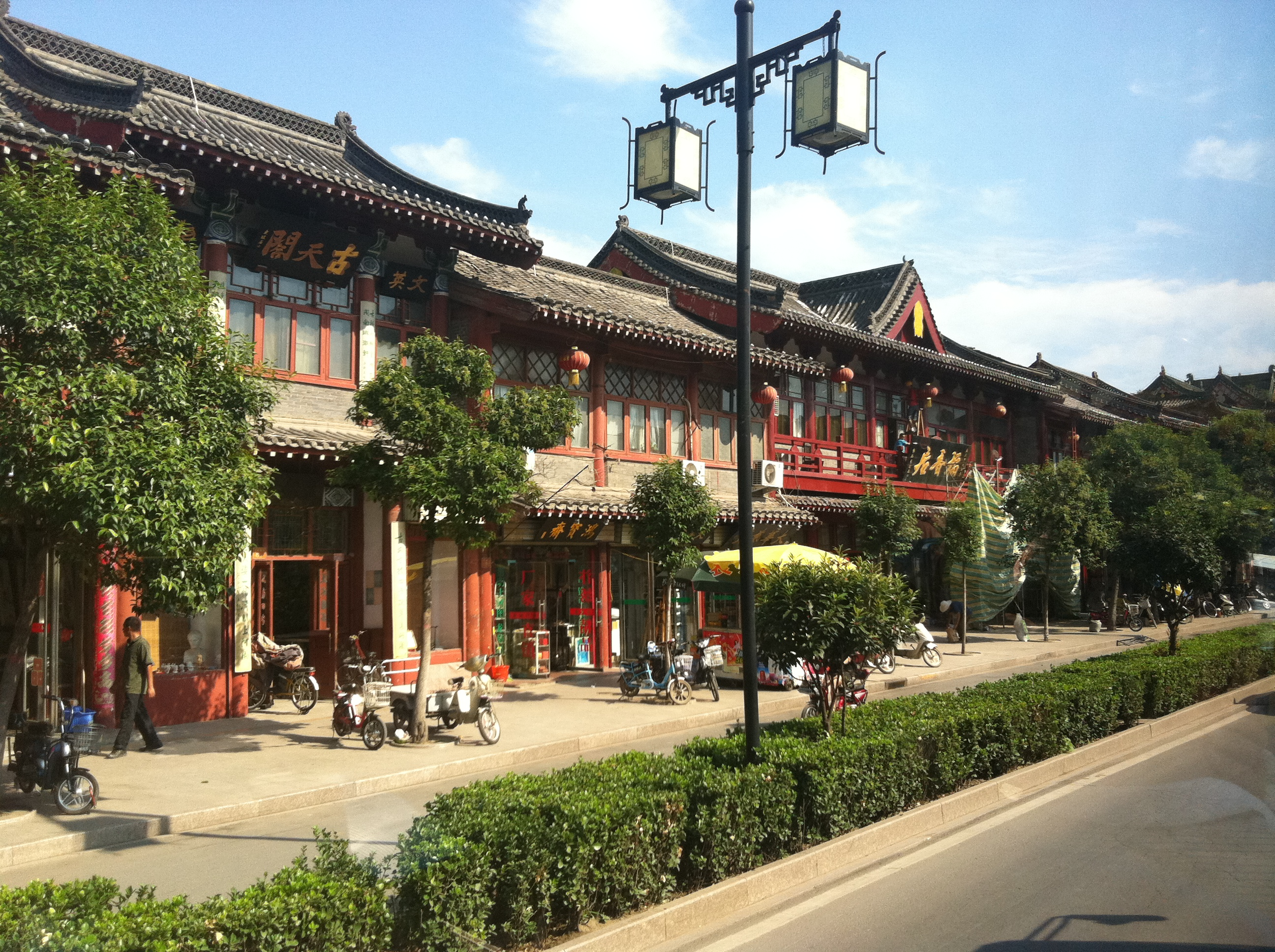
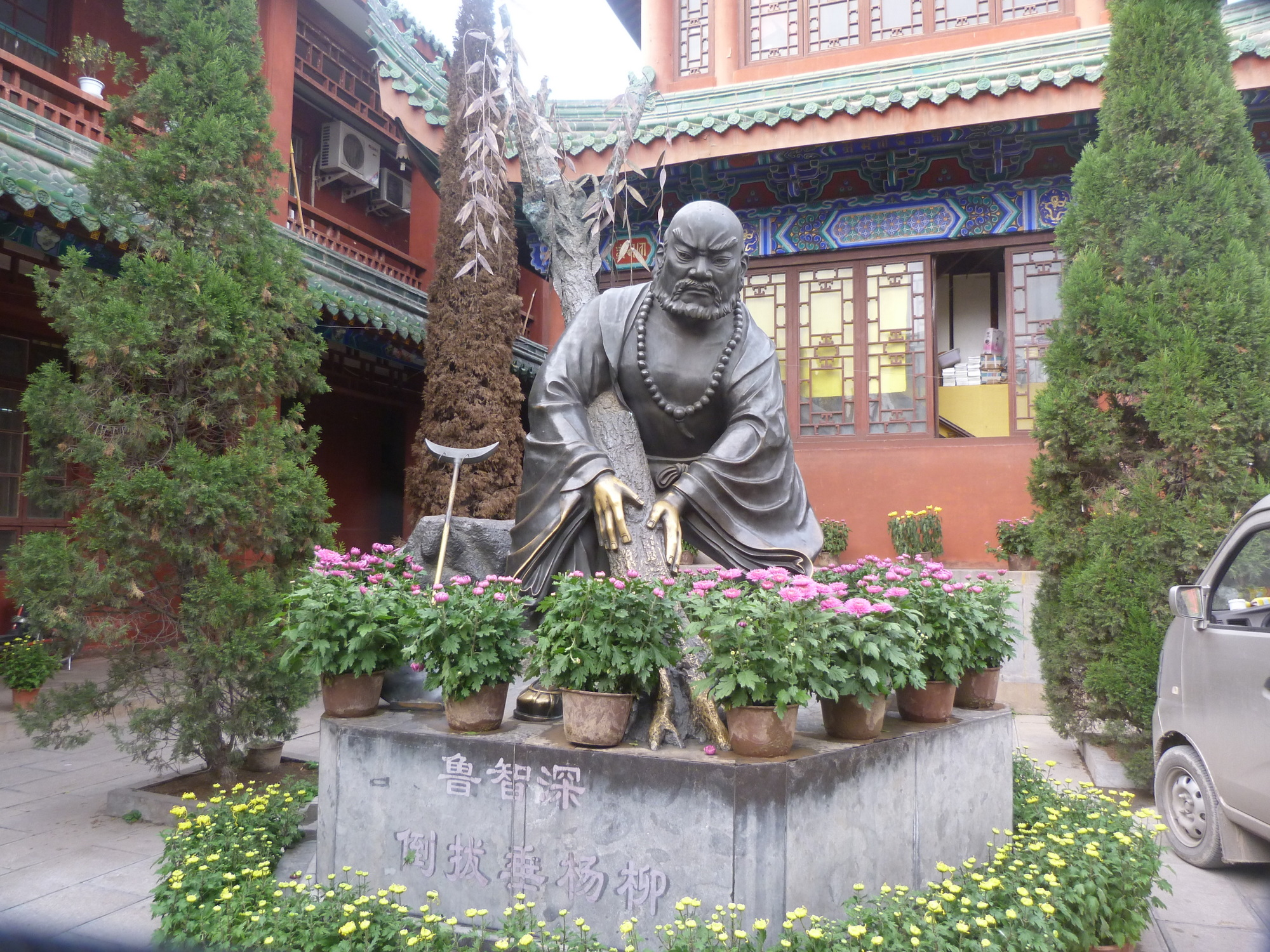
- Dragon Pavilion Kaifeng Mayor's Mansion Iron Pagoda Songdu Royal Street Lu Zhishen Daxiangguo Temple

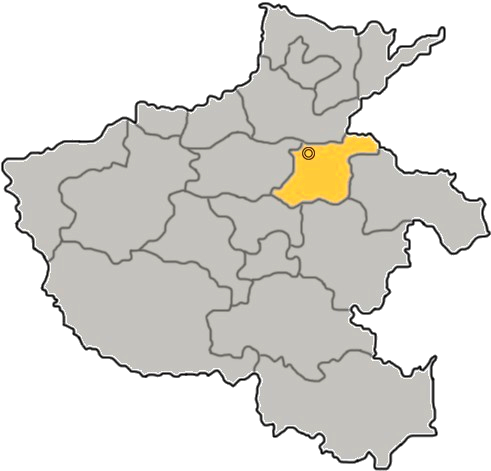
- Location of Kaifeng City jurisdiction in Henan

- Location on the North China Plain Location in China
- Coordinates: 34°47′42″N 114°20′42″E
- Country: People's Republic of China
- Province: Henan
- Municipal seat: Longting District

Area
  - Prefecture-level city: 6,247 km^{2} (2,412 sq mi)
  - Urban: 1,848.5 km^{2} (713.7 sq mi)
  - Metro: 1,848.5 km^{2} (713.7 sq mi)
- Elevation: 75 m (246 ft)

Population (2020 census)
  - Prefecture-level city: 4,824,016
  - Density: 772.2/km^{2} (2,000/sq mi)
  - Urban: 1,735,581
  - Urban density: 938.91/km^{2} (2,431.8/sq mi)
  - Metro: 1,735,581
  - Metro density: 938.91/km^{2} (2,431.8/sq mi)

GDP
  - Prefecture-level city: CN¥ 175.5 billion US$ 26.4 billion
  - Per capita: CN¥ 38,619; US$ 5,814
- Time zone: UTC+8 (China Standard)
- Area code: 371
- ISO 3166 code: CN-HA-02
- Major Nationalities: Han, Hui
- County-level divisions: 5
- License plate prefixes: 豫B
- Website: kaifeng.gov.cn

Kaifeng
- "Kaifeng" in Simplified (top) and Traditional (bottom) Chinese characters
- Simplified Chinese: 开封
- Traditional Chinese: 開封
- Literal meaning: "Opening the Border"
Transcriptions
Standard Mandarin
- Hanyu Pinyin: Kāifēng
- Bopomofo: ㄎㄞ¯ㄈㄥ¯
- Gwoyeu Romatzyh: Kaifeng
- Wade–Giles: K'ai^{1}-feng^{1}
- IPA: [kʰaɪ.fə́ŋ]
other Mandarin
- Xiao'erjing: كَےْفېڭ
Yue: Cantonese
- Yale Romanization: Hōi-fūng
- Jyutping: Hoi^{1}-fung^{1}
- IPA: [hɔj˥.fʊŋ˥]
Southern Min
- Tâi-lô: Khui-pang

Kaifeng (Chinese: 开封; pinyin: Kāifēng) is a prefecture-level city in east-central Henan province, China. It is one of the Eight Ancient Capitals of China, having been the capital eight times in history.

As of the 2020 census, 4,824,016 people lived in Kaifeng's Prefecture, of whom 1,735,581 lived in the metropolitan area consisting of Xiangfu, Longting, Shunhe Hui, Gulou and Yuwantai Districts. Located along the Yellow River's southern bank, it borders the provincial capital of Zhengzhou to the west, Xinxiang to the northwest, Shangqiu to the east, Zhoukou to the southeast, Xuchang to the southwest, and Heze of Shandong to the northeast.

Kaifeng is a major city for research in central China, ranking as the world's 138th top city by scientific output as tracked by the Nature Index. The city is home to a campus of Henan University, one of the national key universities in the Double First Class University Plan.

== Names ==
Kaifeng's official one-character abbreviation in Chinese is 汴 (Biàn). Historically it has also been known as:

- Junyi (浚儀)
- Dàliáng (Chinese: 大梁)
- Biànliáng (汴梁)
- Biànzhōu (汴州)
- Dōngjīng (東京)
- Biànjīng (汴京)

The area was named "Kaifeng" after the Qin's conquest of China in the second century BC. The name literally means "opening the border" and figuratively "hidden" and "vengeance". Its name was originally Qifeng (Chinese: 啓封), but the syllable qi (Baxter-Sagart: /*kʰˤijʔ/) was changed to the essentially synonymous kai (/*Nə-[k]ʰˤəj/, /*[k]ʰˤəj/) to avoid the naming taboo of Liu Qi (Emperor Jing of Han).

== Administration ==
The prefecture-level city of Kaifeng administers five districts and four counties:

- Longting District
- Shunhe Hui District
- Gulou District
- Yuwangtai District
- Xiangfu District
- Qi County
- Tongxu County
- Weishi County
- Lankao County

Map
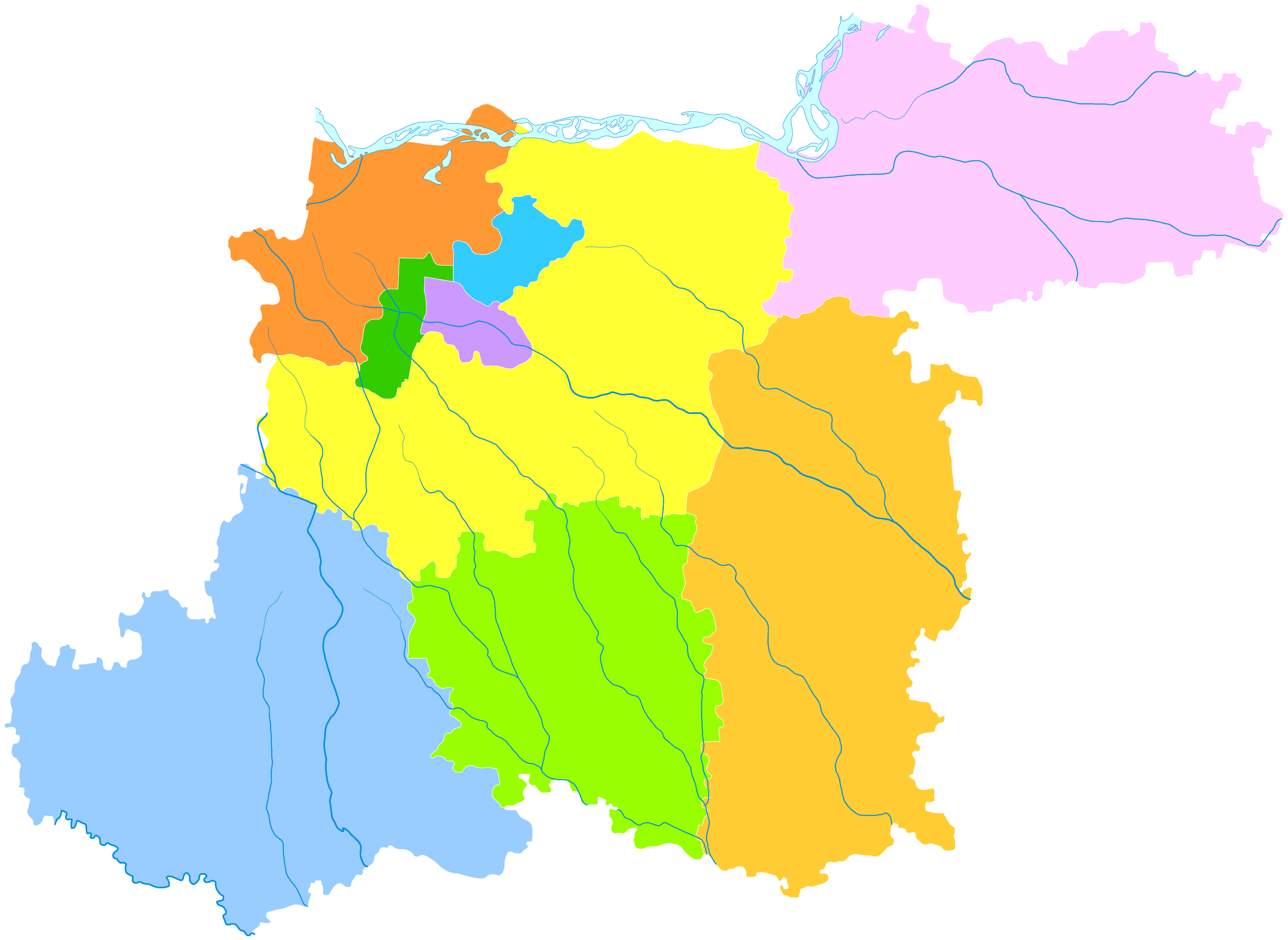

== History ==
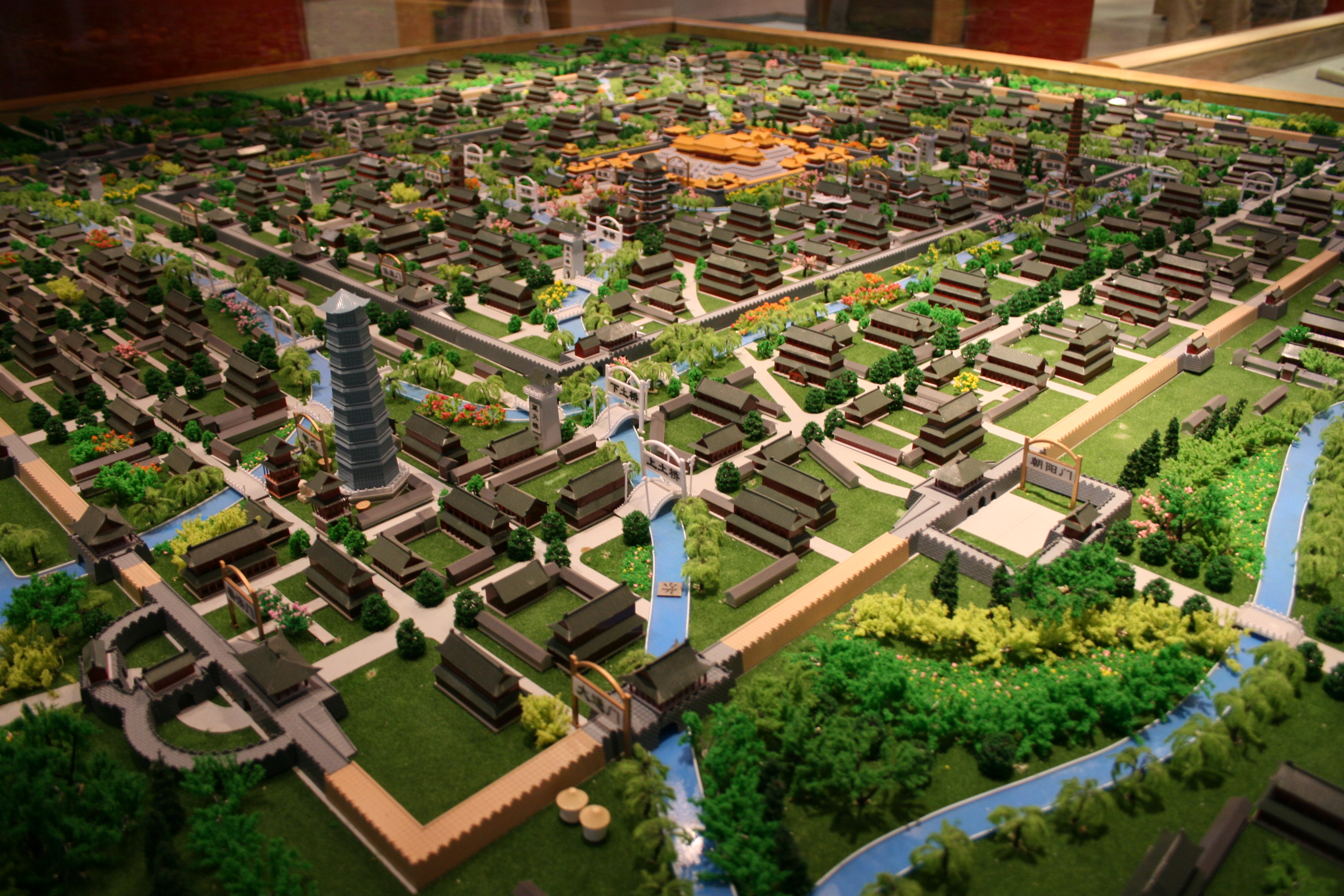
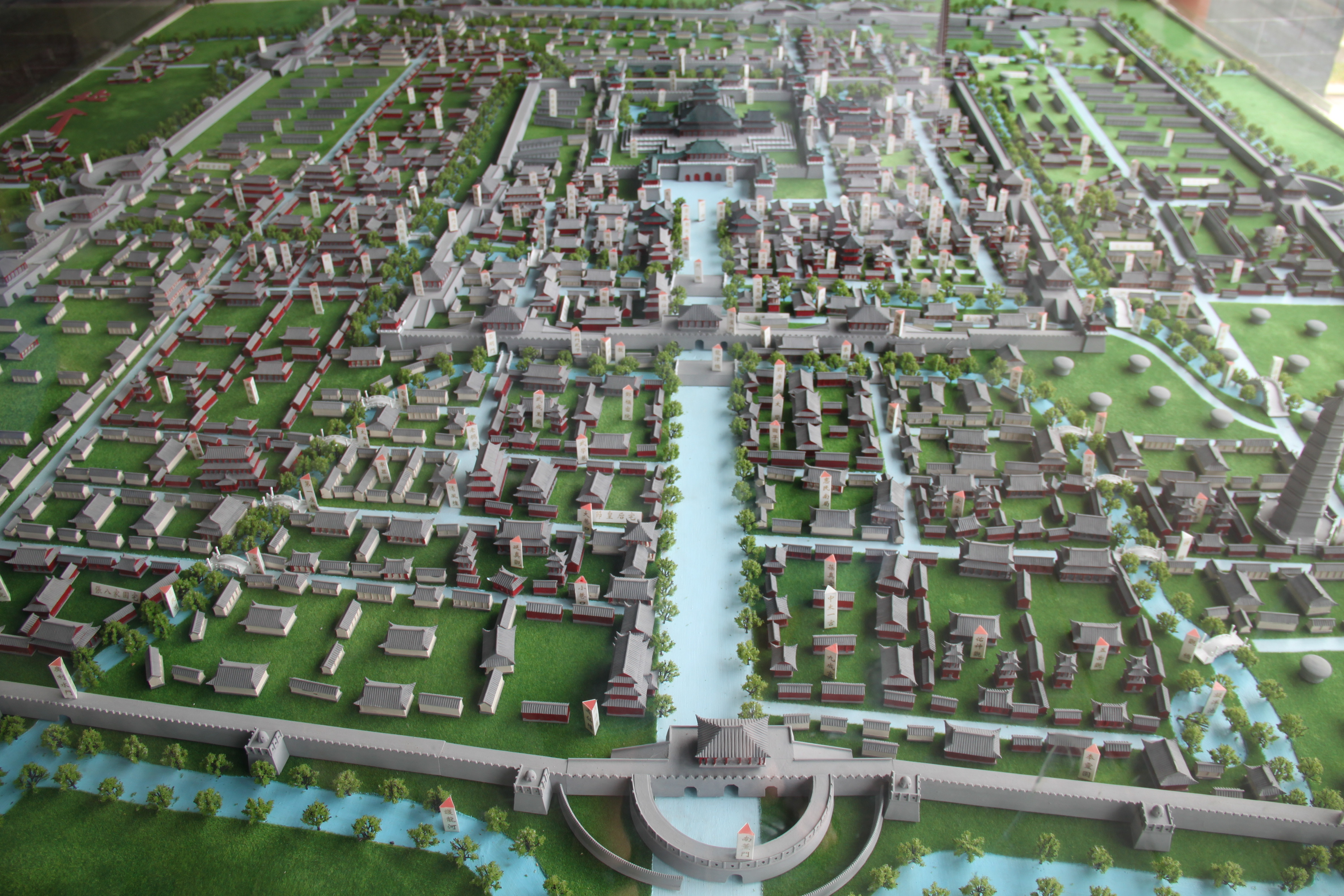
Model diorama of Kaifeng in the Northern Song dynasty

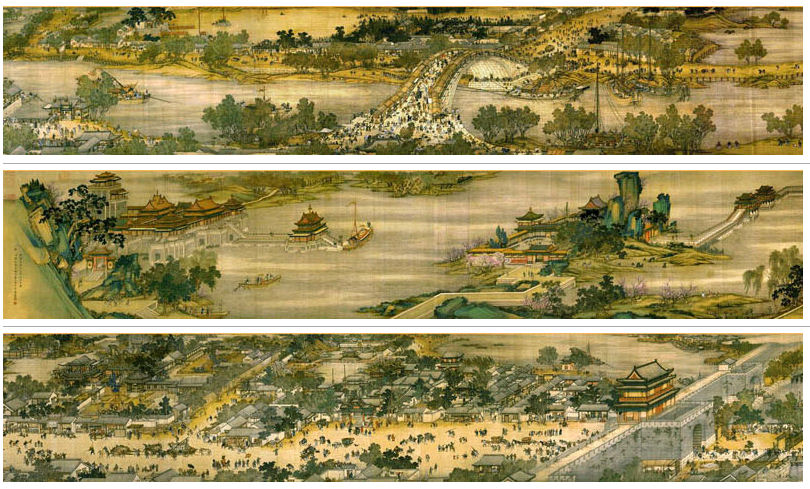
The famous painting Along the River During the Qingming Festival is believed by some to portray life in Kaifeng on Qingming Festival. Several versions exist – the above is an 18th-century recreation – of an original attributed to the 12th-century artist Zhang Zeduan.

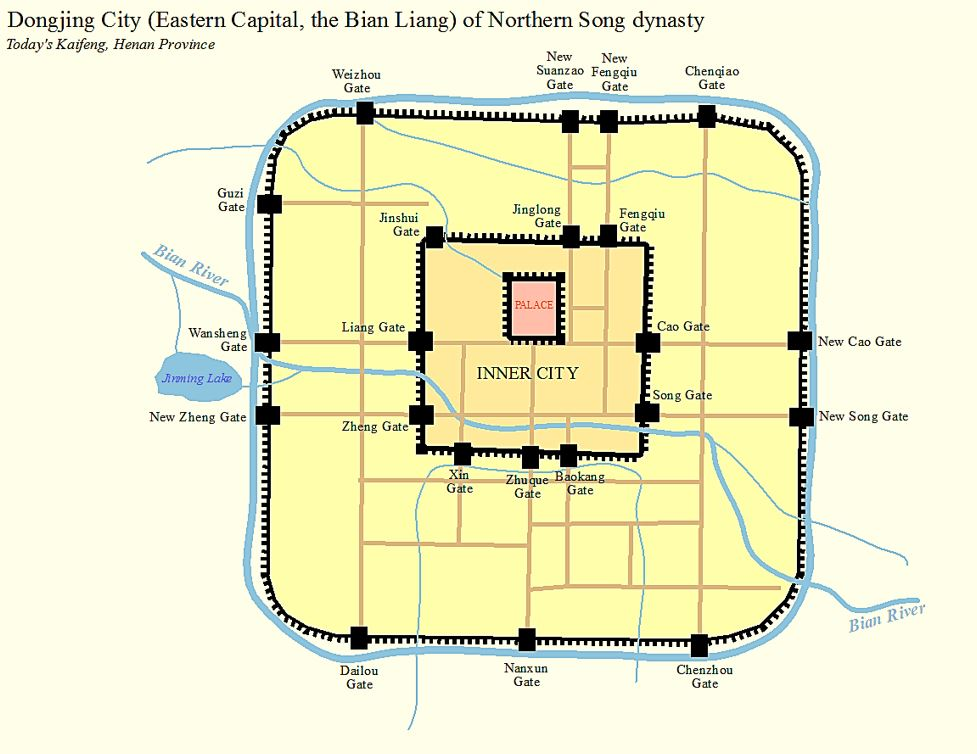
The city of Kaifeng (Dongjing, Bianliang) in Northern Song dynasty

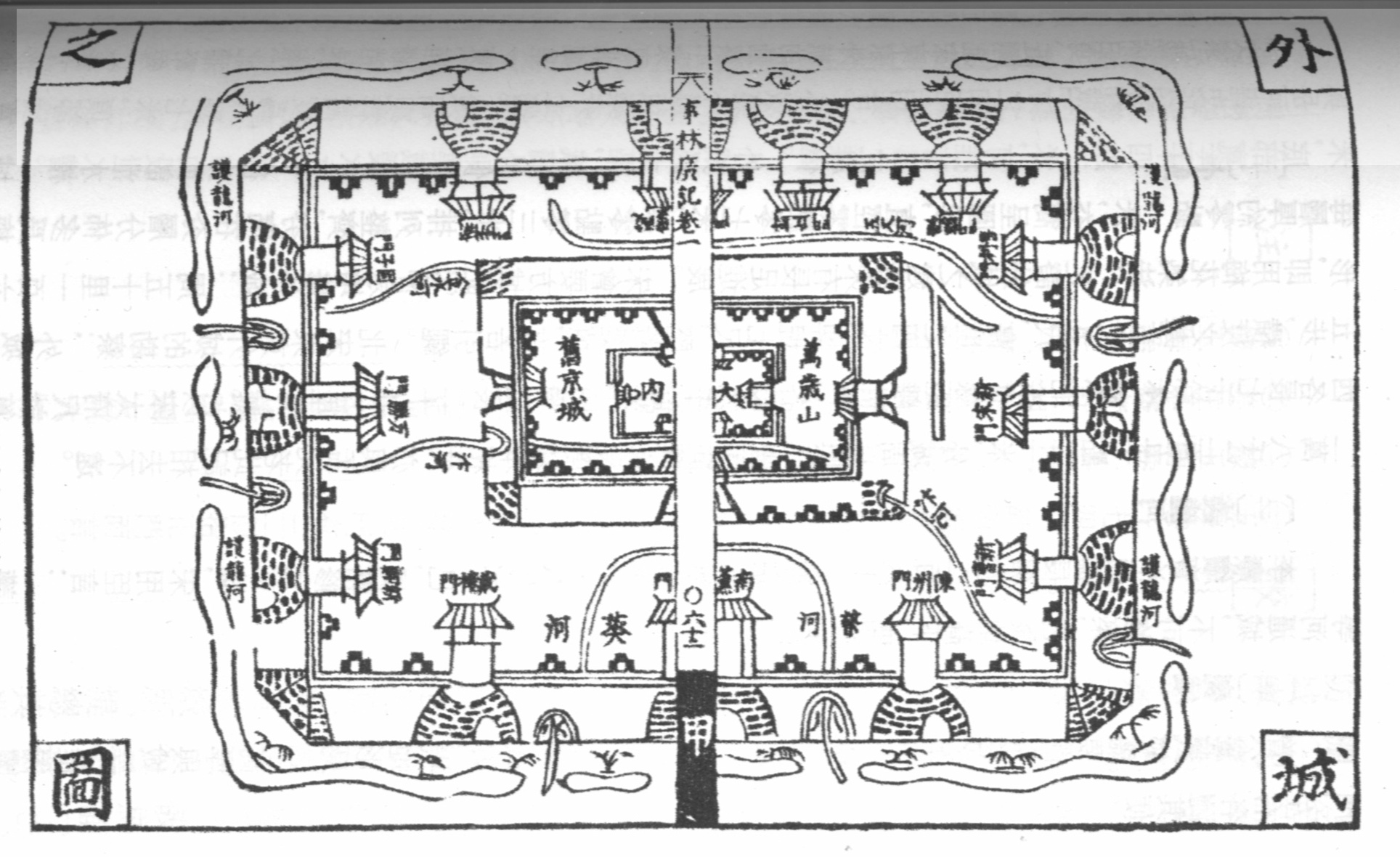
Outer city of Bianjing (Kaifeng), Yuan dynasty map from Shilin Guangji by Chen Yuanjing

Kaifeng is one of the Eight Ancient Capitals of China. There have been many changes during the course of its history.

=== Antiquity ===
During the Spring and Autumn period, there existed two ancient cities in the vicinity of Kaifeng, one is called Yi (儀邑) built by the Wey state and one is Qifeng (啟封), built by Duke Zhuang of Zheng south of the present-day city. Wey was later annexed by the state of Wei.

During the Warring States period, the lords of the state of Wei held the title of King of the realm of Liang (梁王, Liángwáng). In 361 BC, King Hui of Wei relocated the Wei capital from the city of An (安邑) to Yi where he built the city of Daliang (大梁). Thereafter, the Wei state was called Liang. During this period, the first of many canals in the area was constructed linking a local river to the Yellow River. When the State of Qin conquered the State of Wei, Daliang was destroyed and abandoned except for a mid-sized market town, which was renamed Junyi (浚儀).

During the Han dynasty, Junyi was the capital of the Kingdom of Liang ruled by Liu Wu (son of Han emperor Wen) when he was enfeoffed as Prince of Liang. Liu Wu restored the old city walls and constructed many buildings. Daliang became a center of music, art, a refuge for artists, and of splendid gardens despite the trivial political importance of the city at this period. Emperor Jing of Han changed the name of the city of Qifeng to Kaifeng (開封) because of a naming taboo. During the Eastern Han era, the Kingdom of Liang was changed to Liang County, and part of it became the Chenliu Commandery (陳留郡) but was re-established as a principality during the Cao Wei and Jin dynasty. In 202, Cao Cao repaired the Suiyang Canal in Junyi, opening the Bian River to the Yangtze and Huaihe Rivers. The canal's completion allowed grain transport northbound from the Yangtze and Huaihe River regions, and Junyi, strategically located at a waterway and land junction, saw an economic recovery.

=== Northern dynasties and Sui, Tang ===
The city fell into decline during the turmoil at the end of the Western Jin dynasty and during the Sixteen Kingdoms era. In 534, Emperor Xiaojing of Eastern Wei changed Chenliu County to Liangzhou (梁州). In 555, the Daxiangguo Temple was built. During the Northern Zhou dynasty, Liangzhou was renamed as Bianzhou (汴州), named after the Bian River.

Early in the 7th century, the old city of Daliang, now called Bianzhou (汴州城) was transformed into a major commercial hub when it was connected to the Grand Canal as well as through the construction of a canal running to western Shandong. In 781 during the Tang dynasty, a new city wall with a circumference of 22 li was constructed by Bianzhou's governor Li Mian. Meanwhile the old city of Kaifeng (Qifeng) declined in prominence and later abandoned. The ruins of Qifeng can be found near today's Zhuxian town.

=== Song dynasty to Mongol eras ===
During the Five Dynasties period, Emperor Taizu of Liang established his capital in Bianzhou, calling it Dongdu (東都) or Eastern Capital (the previous Tang dynasty's eastern capital was Luoyang). Dongdu was the capital of the successive dynasties of Later Liang (913-923), Later Jin (936–946), Later Han (947–950), and Later Zhou (951–960). In 955, the city underwent further expansion as Emperor Shizong of Zhou mobilized 100,000 civilians to build an outer city. The Song dynasty made Bian its capital when it overthrew the Later Zhou in 960, renamed it the Eastern Capital of Bianliang (東京汴梁), or Dongjing (東京).

During the Song dynasty, the governmental entity of the capital was the Kaifeng Prefecture (Kaifeng Fu, 開封府) and it was the only prefecture of the Capital Region (Jingji Lu, 京畿路). In 1010, Xiangfu County was established under Kaifeng Prefecture, so the region was also called Xiangfu (祥符).

Kaifeng-Dongjing became largest and most prosperous city in China, with a population of over 400,000 living both inside and outside the city wall. The historian Jacques Gernet provides a lively picture of life in this period in his Daily Life in China on the Eve of the Mongol Invasion, 1250-1276, which often draws on Dongjing Meng Hua Lu, a nostalgic memoir of the city.

According to the Dongjing Menghualu: "Outside Donghua Gate, the market was bustling... All manners of food, seasonal fruits and flowers, fish, shrimp, turtle, crab, quail and rabbit jerky, cured meats, gold, jade, and treasures, as well as clothings, were the finest in the world. The taste was exquisite, and if a customer requested a dozen or so dishes to go with their wine, they would be readily available".

In addition to daytime trading, there were also night markets and dawn markets. The main street of Dongjing was called the Imperial Street (御街). There were patrol stations located every two or three hundred steps, the patrolmen directed pedestrian and vehicle traffic during the day, and guarded government offices and merchants' residences at night. The city's restaurants (fencha 分茶), taverns (wasi 瓦肆) and theaters (goulan 勾阑) could accommodate and entertain thousands of people. Daily performances included storytelling, singing, puppet shows, dance and acrobatics. The Northern Song painter Zhang Zeduan's painting Along the River During the Qingming Festival depicts the bustling scenery of the capital and the banks of the Bian River during the Qingming Festival.

In 1049, the Iron Pagoda of Youguo Temple (佑國寺塔) was constructed, measuring 54.7 m (179 ft) in height. It has survived the vicissitudes of war and floods to become the oldest landmark in this ancient city. Another Song-dynasty pagoda, Po Pagoda, dating from 974, has been partially destroyed.

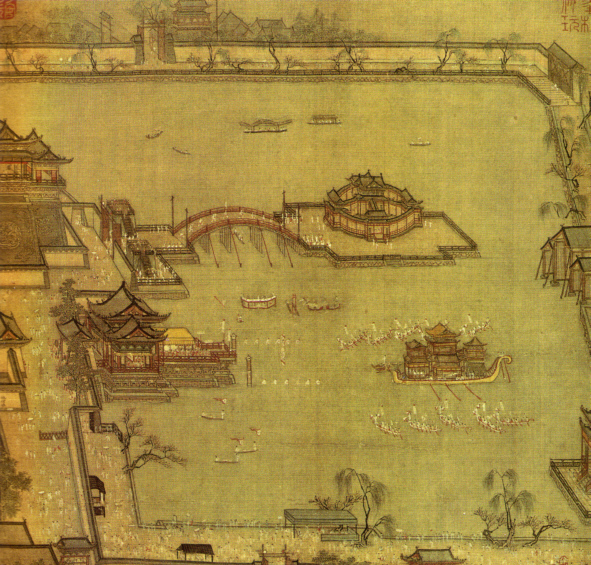
Games in the Jinming Pool, an early 12th-century painting depicting Kaifeng, by Zhang Zeduan.

Another well-known sight was the astronomical clock tower of the engineer, scientist, and statesman Su Song (1020–1101 AD). It was crowned with a rotating armillary sphere that was hydraulically powered (i.e. by water wheel and a water clock), yet it incorporated an escapement mechanism two hundred years before they were found in the clockworks of Europe and featured the first known endless power-transmitting chain drive.

Dongjing reached its peak importance in the 11th century as a commercial and industrial center at the intersection of four major canals. During this time, the city was surrounded by three rings of city walls and probably had a population of between 600,000 and 700,000. It is believed that it was the largest city in the world from 1013 to 1127.

This period ended in 1127 when the city fell was occupied by barbarian invaders. The Jin ruler ordered all the assets and captured prisoners, including the Song imperial family and officials who refused to escape, to be taken back to the Jin capital – Shangjing (near present-day Harbin). Prince Zhao Gou escaped and moved the remaining Song court away. The Jurchens retreated during the year but the Song court never moved back to Bianliang. Dongjing was renamed Bianjing (汴京). It was captured by the Jurchens again in 1130 and became the capital of a Han-ruled puppet kingdom called Great Qi（大齊）until 1138. It subsequently came under the direct rule of the Jin regime, which had occupied most of North China.

From 1211, Genghis Khan led his troops to attack the Jin state several times. In 1214, the Jin moved the imperial court southwards to Kaifeng, relying on the Yellow River defense line to resist the Mongols. In 1233, Kaifeng fell to Mongol forces after a 10 months siege. The city was looted and all Jin family members were killed.

During the Mongol occupation, Kaifeng became the capital of Henan Jiangbei Province, which was established in 1268. In 1260, Marco Polo arrived at Kaifeng, and wrote about it in his diaries.

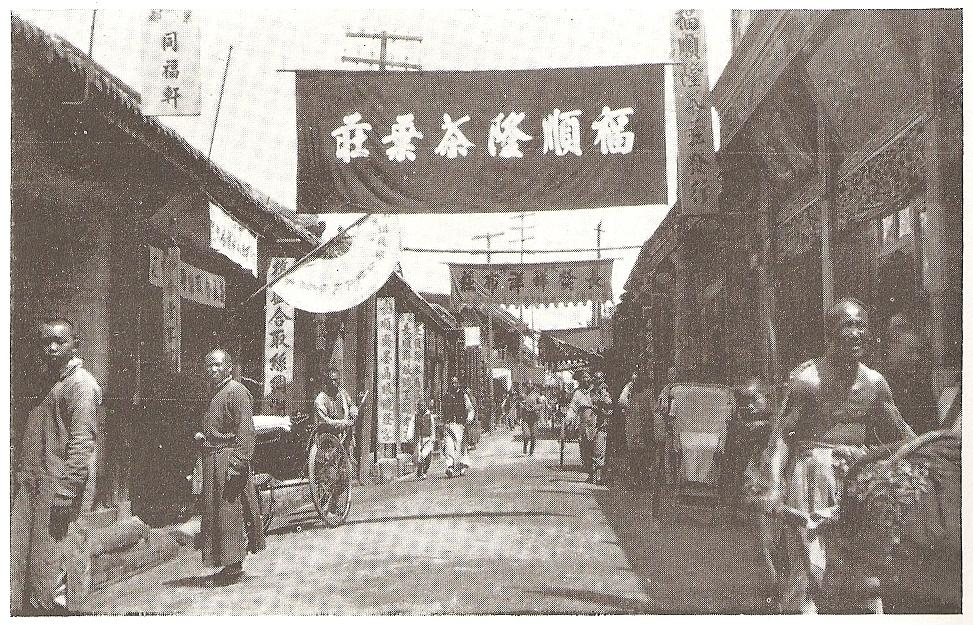
East Market Street, Kaifeng, 1910. The synagogue of the Kaifeng Jews lay beyond the row of stores on the right

=== Ming, Qing and modern time ===
From 1358 to 1359, the city was briefly captured by the Red Turban rebels led by Liu Futong and Han Lin'er, who proclaimed emperor of the restored Song. They were crushed by the Yuan forces. In 1368, Bianliang was captured by the Ming dynasty and was reverted back to the old name Kaifeng. During the reign of the Hongwu Emperor, Kaifeng Prefecture was designated as the secondary Northern Capital of the Ming dynasty, bearing the name of Beijing, in anticipation of the construction of the new capital Zhongdu in Fengyang. In 1378, the Zhongdu project was abolished and Kaifeng Prefecture became the capital of Henan province. Kaifeng remained the capital of Henan from Ming to the early years of the People's Republic. It was until 1954 that the capital of Henan province was moved to Zhengzhou. In 1410, the Yellow River flooded, destroying the city and killing 14,000 households.

Kaifeng was conveniently situated along the Grand Canal for logistics supply but militarily vulnerable due to its position on the floodplains of the Yellow River. Five major floods devastated the city between 1375 and 1416, and flooding occurred more than 300 times from the Southern Song Dynasty to the late Qing dynasty.

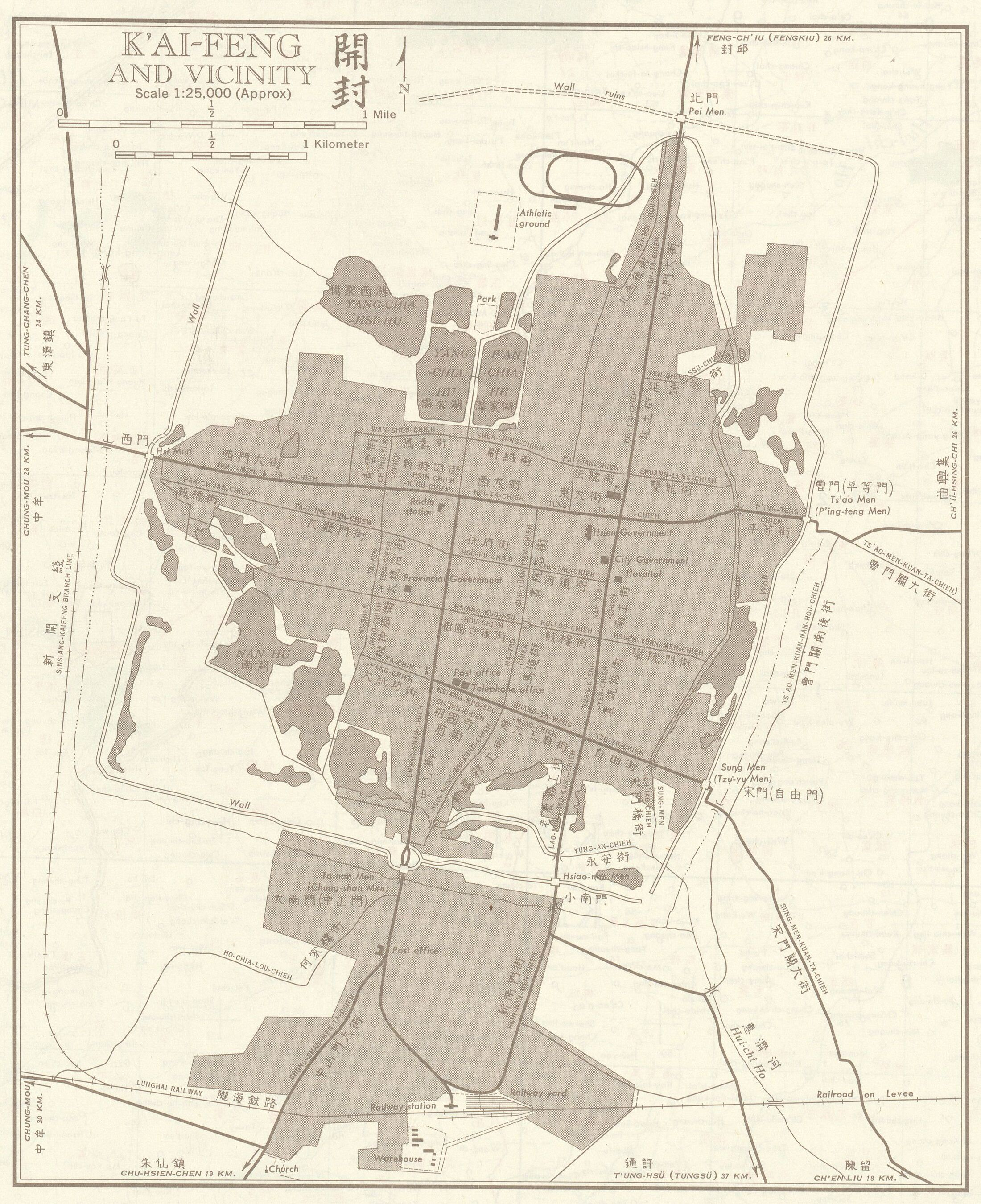
Map of Kaifeng (K'ai-feng) in 1950s

In 1642, rebels attacked Kaifeng three times. During the third siege, Kaifeng was flooded by the Ming army by the Yellow River to drown the rebels. The entire city was submerged in several feet deep water. Only 30,000 of the 370,000 people in the city remained. After this disaster, the city was abandoned again. In 1662, Kaifeng was rebuilt. Another reconstruction in 1843 followed the flood of 1841, shaping Kaifeng as it stands today.

The Jews at Kaifeng were recorded as well. From the 8th to 9th century and up to the 19th century, Kaifeng was known for having the oldest extant Jewish community in China, the Kaifeng Jews. As of 2016, there are 500 to 1,000 Jews still left in the city.

From June 1938 to August 1945, the city was occupied by the invading Japanese Imperial Army. In 1948, the Battle of Kaifeng occurred between Chinese communist forces and Chinese Nationalist forces but ultimately lead to a PLA Victory and the collapse of the Nationalist forces.

In October 1954, the capital of Henan province was moved from Kaifeng to Zhengzhou. In September 1983, Kaifeng City (开封市) was formed on the basis of former prefectures and districts.

== Climate ==
Kaifeng has a monsoon-influenced humid subtropical climate (Köppen Cwa) that borders on a humid continental climate, with four distinct seasons. Winters are cool and mostly dry while summers are hot and humid; spring is warm and sees some, but not much rainfall, while autumn weather is crisp and drier. Precipitation mainly occurs from June to September. Extreme temperatures in the city since 1951 have ranged from −16 °C (3 °F) on December 27, 1971, to 42.9 °C (109 °F) on June 19, 1966.

Climate data for Kaifeng, elevation 74 m (243 ft), (1991–2020 normals, extremes 1966–present)
Month	Jan	Feb	Mar	Apr	May	Jun	Jul	Aug	Sep	Oct	Nov	Dec	Year
Record high °C (°F)	20.4 (68.7)	25.5 (77.9)	29.9 (85.8)	36.0 (96.8)	39.1 (102.4)	42.9 (109.2)	40.6 (105.1)	38.0 (100.4)	37.4 (99.3)	34.1 (93.4)	26.9 (80.4)	22.4 (72.3)	42.9 (109.2)
Mean daily maximum °C (°F)	5.4 (41.7)	9.4 (48.9)	15.3 (59.5)	21.8 (71.2)	27.2 (81.0)	31.7 (89.1)	32.0 (89.6)	30.7 (87.3)	26.9 (80.4)	21.6 (70.9)	13.9 (57.0)	7.4 (45.3)	20.3 (68.5)
Daily mean °C (°F)	0.7 (33.3)	4.2 (39.6)	9.8 (49.6)	16.1 (61.0)	21.7 (71.1)	26.2 (79.2)	27.6 (81.7)	26.3 (79.3)	21.9 (71.4)	16.2 (61.2)	8.8 (47.8)	2.7 (36.9)	15.2 (59.3)
Mean daily minimum °C (°F)	−2.9 (26.8)	0.0 (32.0)	5.2 (41.4)	11.1 (52.0)	16.6 (61.9)	21.3 (70.3)	23.9 (75.0)	22.8 (73.0)	17.8 (64.0)	11.8 (53.2)	4.7 (40.5)	−1.0 (30.2)	10.9 (51.7)
Record low °C (°F)	−15.0 (5.0)	−14.2 (6.4)	−7.3 (18.9)	−1.6 (29.1)	5.0 (41.0)	11.3 (52.3)	15.2 (59.4)	13.1 (55.6)	6.0 (42.8)	−0.2 (31.6)	−11.7 (10.9)	−16.0 (3.2)	−16.0 (3.2)
Average precipitation mm (inches)	8.7 (0.34)	11.2 (0.44)	19.2 (0.76)	38.6 (1.52)	51.3 (2.02)	62.1 (2.44)	157.9 (6.22)	134.6 (5.30)	66.3 (2.61)	31.7 (1.25)	24.9 (0.98)	8.8 (0.35)	615.3 (24.23)
Average precipitation days (≥ 0.1 mm)	3.4	4.2	4.6	5.3	6.6	7.1	10.6	9.6	7.8	5.7	4.8	3.0	72.7
Average snowy days	4.0	3.1	1.2	0.2	0	0	0	0	0	0	1.1	2.7	12.3
Average relative humidity (%)	59	58	57	61	61	62	75	77	72	65	64	61	64
Mean monthly sunshine hours	118.7	131.3	172.7	199.1	214.4	195.7	167.0	163.3	152.4	155.6	135.4	123.7	1,929.3
Percentage possible sunshine	38	42	46	51	50	45	38	40	41	45	44	41	43
Source 1: China Meteorological Administrationall-time January high
Source 2: Weather China

== Transportation ==
=== Air ===
Downtown Kaifeng is about 55 km (34 mi) away from Zhengzhou Xinzheng International Airport (IATA: CGO, ICAO: ZHCC), which is the busiest airport in central China in terms of both passenger and cargo traffic (2017 statistics).

With the completion of Zhengzhou–Kaifeng intercity railway and Zhengzhou–Xinzheng Airport intercity railway, fast train connections to Zhengzhou Xinzheng International Airport from Kaifeng became available. As of August 2018, there are 12 pairs of intercity trains running between Xinzheng Airport and Songchenglu every day, with a travel time of 53 min.

=== Rail ===
Kaifeng railway station is on the east–west Longhai Railway mainline and provides convenient access to many cities around China, including Beijing West, Shanghai, Shanghai Hongqiao, Tianjin, Xi'an, Jinan, Hangzhou. Services to Zhengzhou, Luoyang and Qingdao are also frequent and convenient. Direct long-distance services to Shenzhen, Guangzhou, Chengdu, Chongqing North, Harbin, Ürümqi, Fuzhou, Dalian and Wuhan are also available.

The Zhengzhou–Kaifeng intercity railway (郑开城际铁路) started operation on 28 December 2014, connecting the provincial capital Zhengzhou and Kaifeng. The railway currently terminates at Songchenglu, and is planned to be extended to Kaifeng railway station. The designed top speed is 200 km/h (120 mph).

Kaifeng North railway station of the Xuzhou–Lanzhou high-speed railway is the main high-speed railway station of the city. It started operation on 10 September 2016.

=== Coach ===
There are 4 main coach stations in Kaifeng:

- Kaifeng West Coach Station (开封客运西站)
- Kaifeng Long-Distance Coach Station (开封长途汽车站)
- Kaifeng Jinming Coach Station (开封金明汽车站)
- Kaifeng XiangGuosi Coach Station (开封相国寺汽车站)

There are frequent services to many neighboring counties, other provincial cities and long-distance services to other provinces.

=== Road transport ===
- G30 Lianyungang–Khorgas Expressway
- G45 Daqing–Guangzhou Expressway
- S82 Zhengzhou–Minquan Expressway
- S83 Lankao–Nanyang Expressway
- China National Highway 106
- China National Highway 220
- China National Highway 310

== Culture ==
=== Religion ===
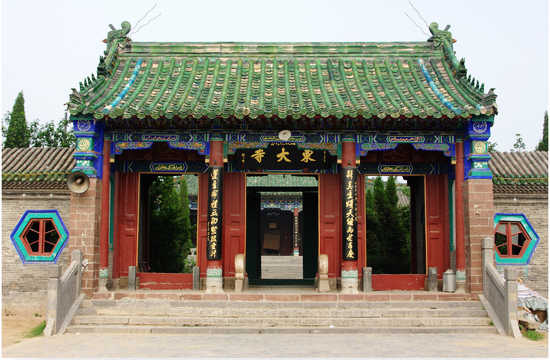
One of Kaifeng's many women's mosques

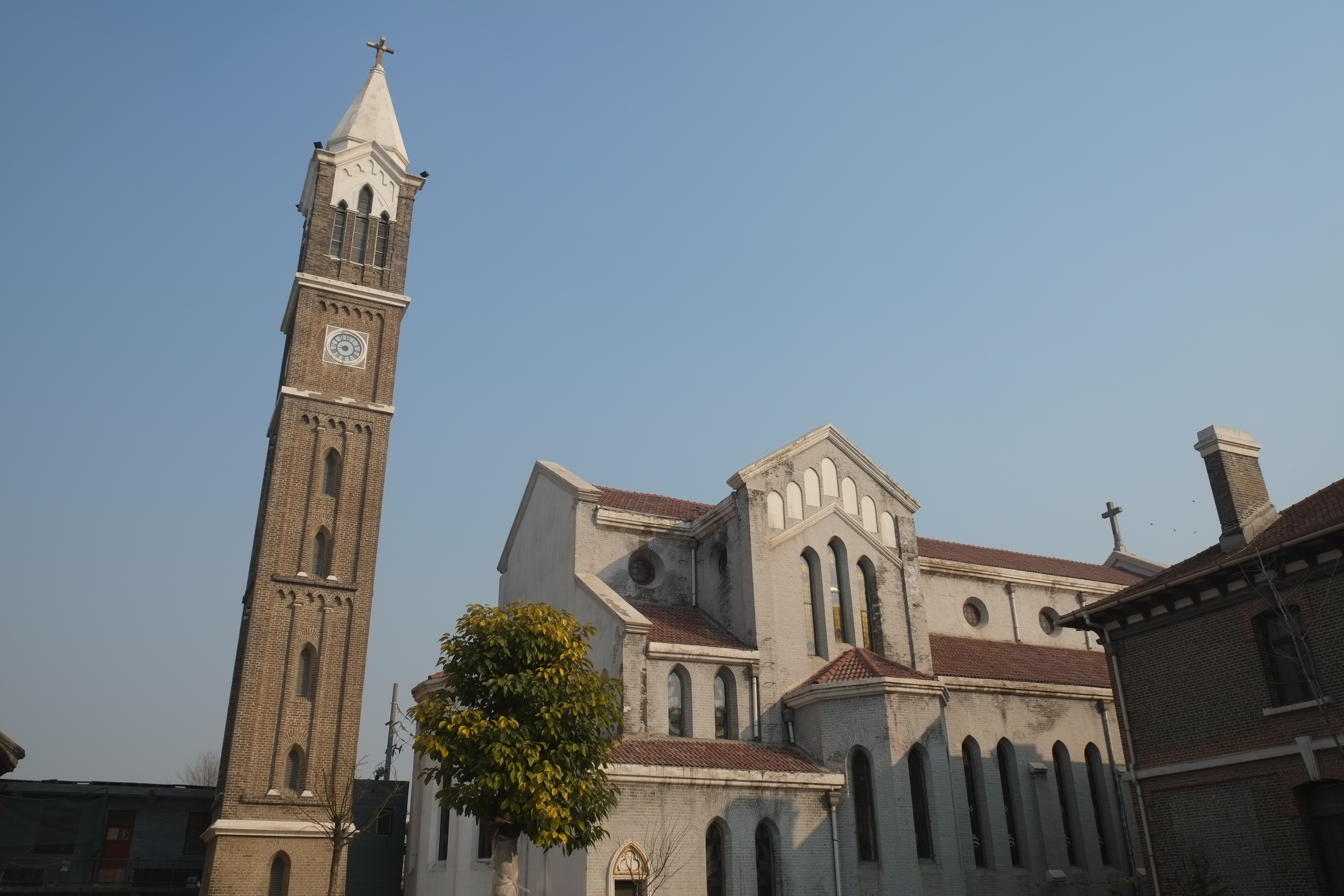
Sacred Heart Cathedral, Kaifeng

Kaifeng is known for having the oldest extant Jewish community in China, the Kaifeng Jews.

It also has a significant Muslim enclave and is notable for its many women's mosques (nǚsì), including the oldest nǚsì in China: Wangjia Hutong Women's Mosque, which dates to 1820.

There are also some active Christian churches, including the Sacred Heart Cathedral (开封耶稣圣心主教座堂).

=== Cuisine ===
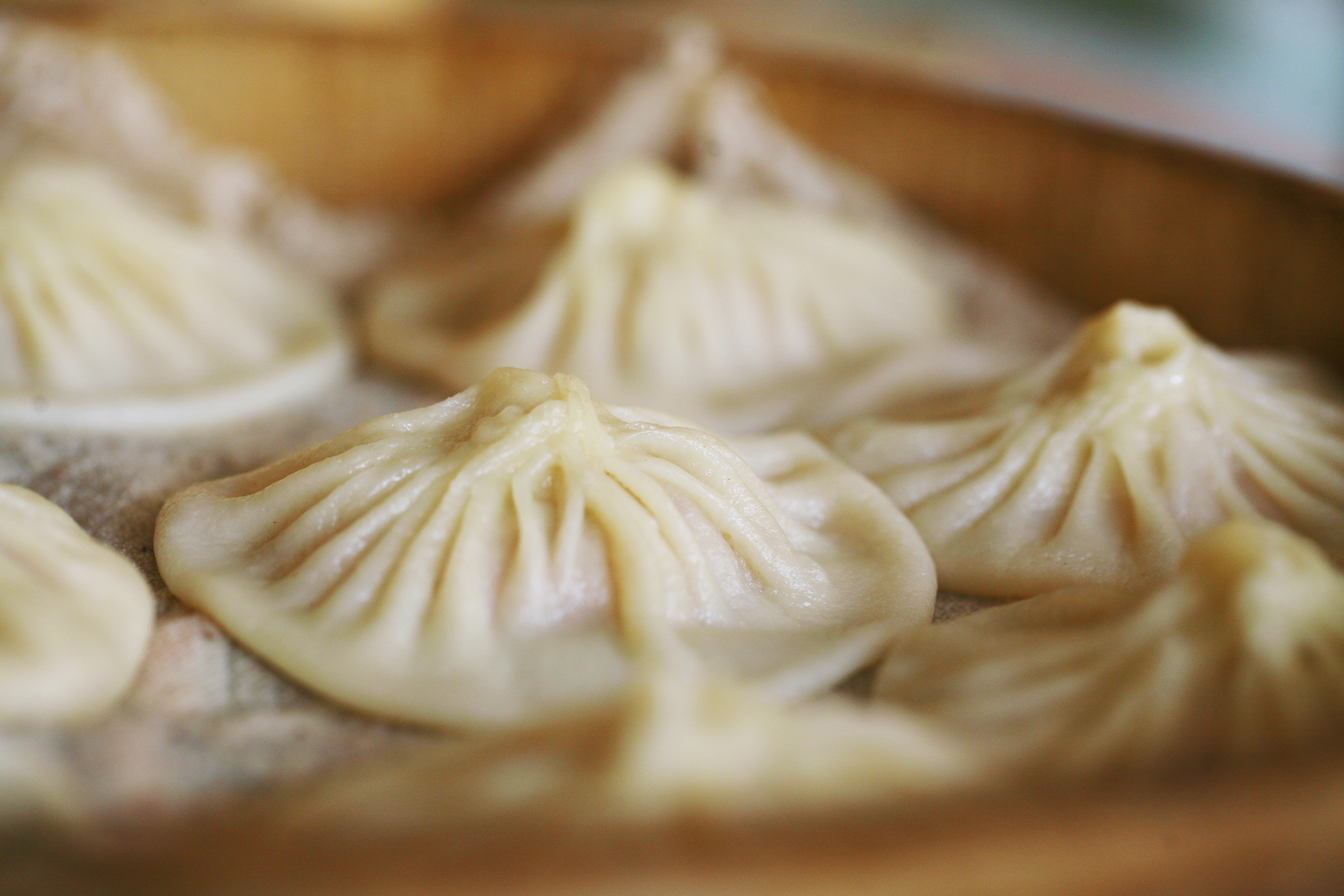
Kaifeng-style Xiaolongbao

Kaifeng cuisine plays a dominant part in forming Henan cuisine.

Kaifeng offers a wide range of food specialties such as steamed pie and dumplings. Particularly famous is Kaifeng's five-spice bread (wǔxiāng shāobǐng), which, like pita, can be opened and filled. People from nearby Zhengzhou often come to Kaifeng to visit family members and to enjoy the night markets.

The Ma Yu Ching's Bucket Chicken House (马豫兴桶子鸡;; Mǎ Yùxīng Tǒngzi Jī), located in Kaifeng, is by some accounts the world's oldest restaurant.

=== Chrysanthemums ===
The chrysanthemum is the city flower of Kaifeng. The tradition of cultivating varieties of chrysanthemums extends back 1600 years, and the scale of cultivation reached its height during the Song dynasty until its loss to the Jürchens in 1126.

The city has held the Kaifeng Chrysanthemum Cultural Festival annually in fall since 1983 (having been renamed in 1994). During the festival, hundreds of chrysanthemums breeds are on show at festival venues, and the flower becomes a common feature around the city. Kaifeng has been dubbed the "city of chrysanthemums".

=== Sporting events ===
The China Zheng-Kai International Marathon (中国郑开国际马拉松赛) is held annually in the spring by the Chinese Athletic Association and municipal and provincial governments. It is the premier international sports competition in Henan province and one of the biggest sports competitions in the central-west of China. The main part of the event occurs along Zhengkai Express Way (郑开大道). At its launch in 2007, 5600 athletes competed. By 2012, almost 25,000 athletes from 28 countries and regions have participated in the ZK International Marathon.

== Military ==
Kaifeng is the headquarters of the 20th Group Army of the People's Liberation Army, one of three group armies that compose the Jinan Military Region responsible for the defense of the Yellow River Plain.

Kaifeng Air Base is a military airfield in the southern suburb of Kaifeng City. It does not provide civilian aviation service.

== Gallery ==
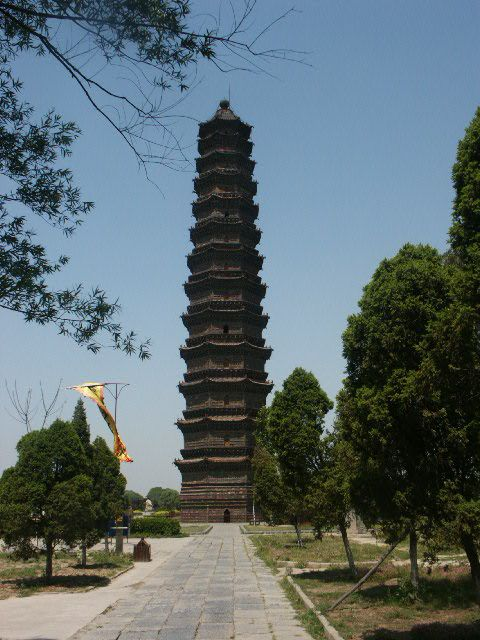
The Iron Pagoda

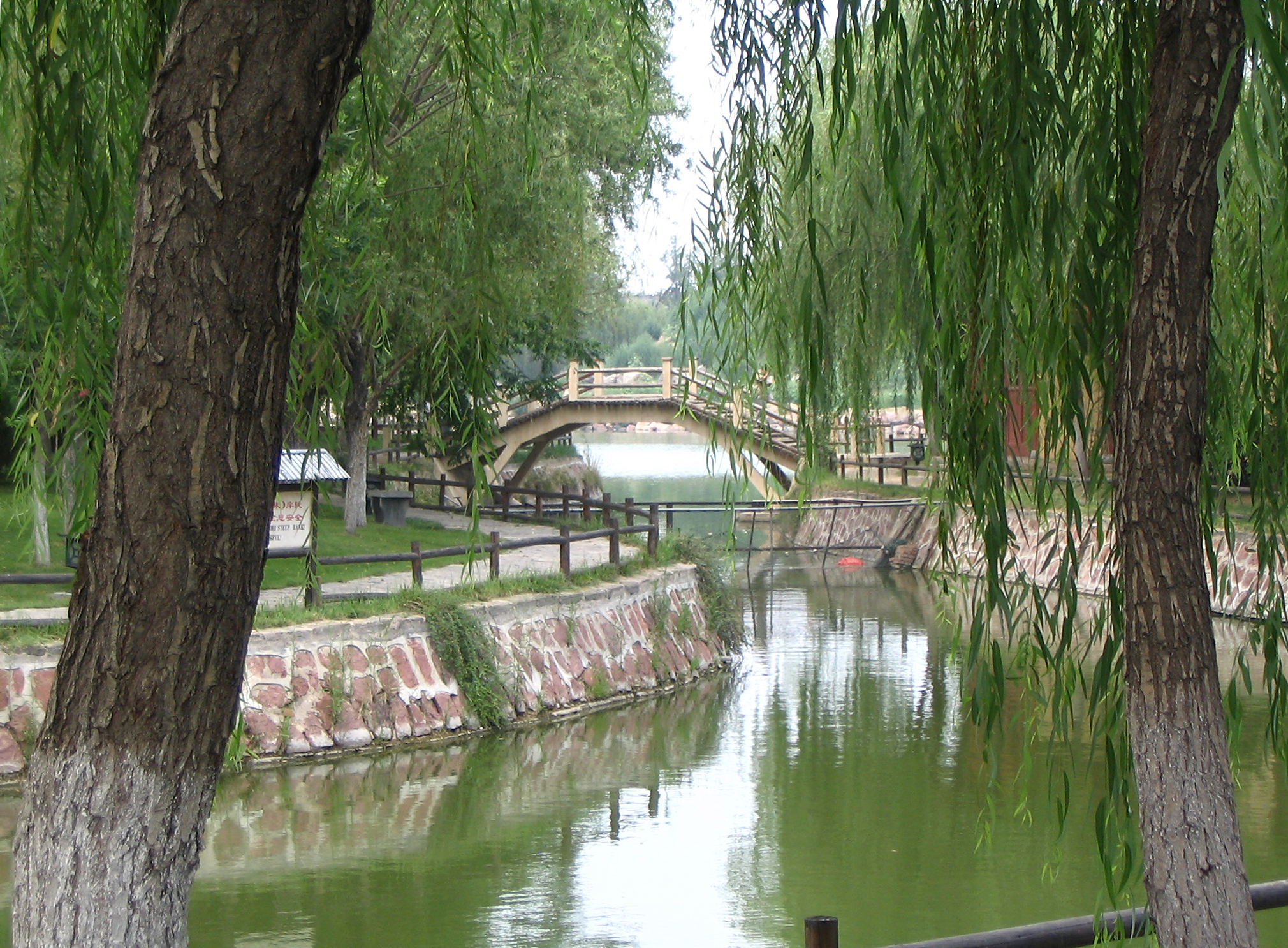
Qingming Riverside Landscape Garden

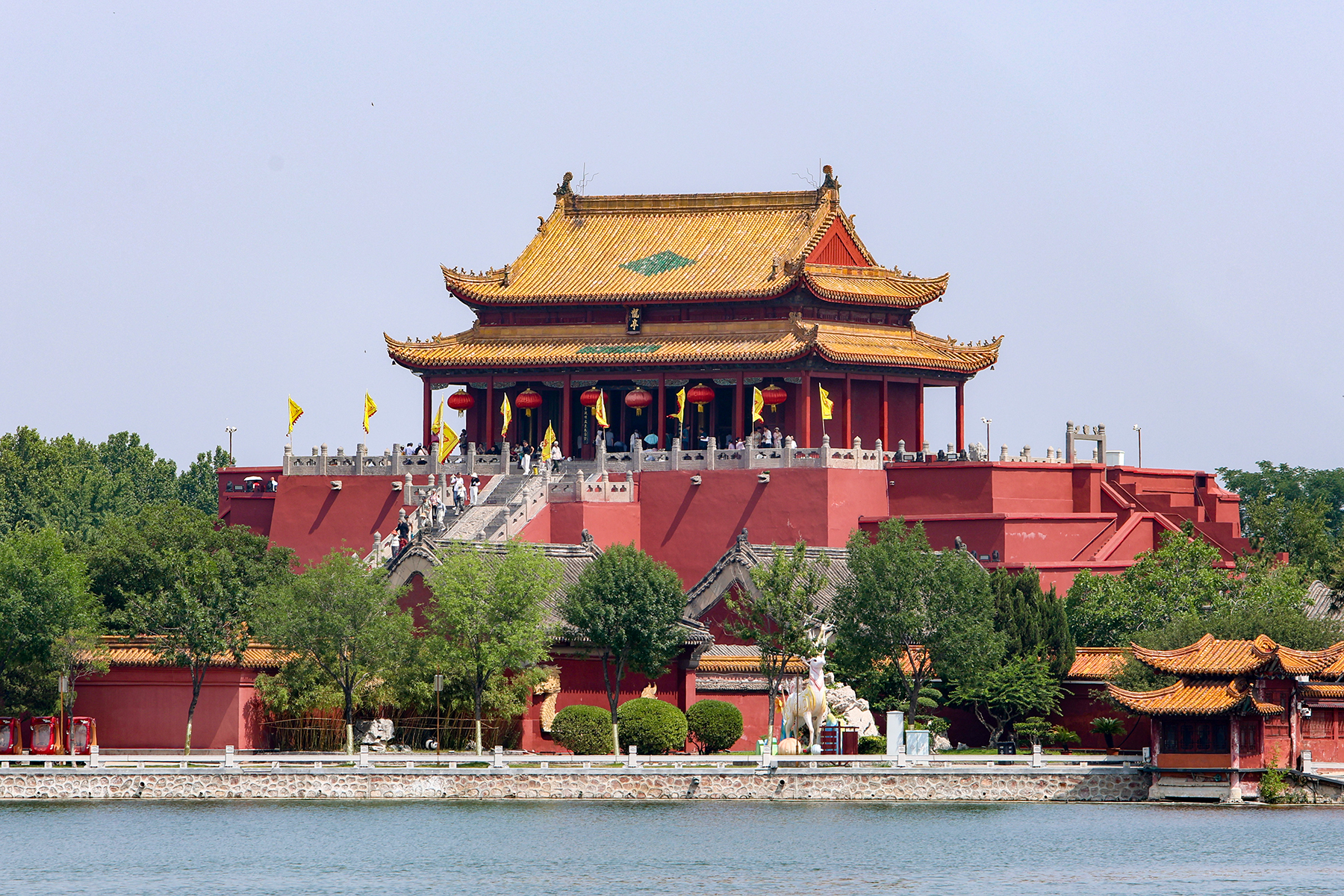
Dragon Pavilion

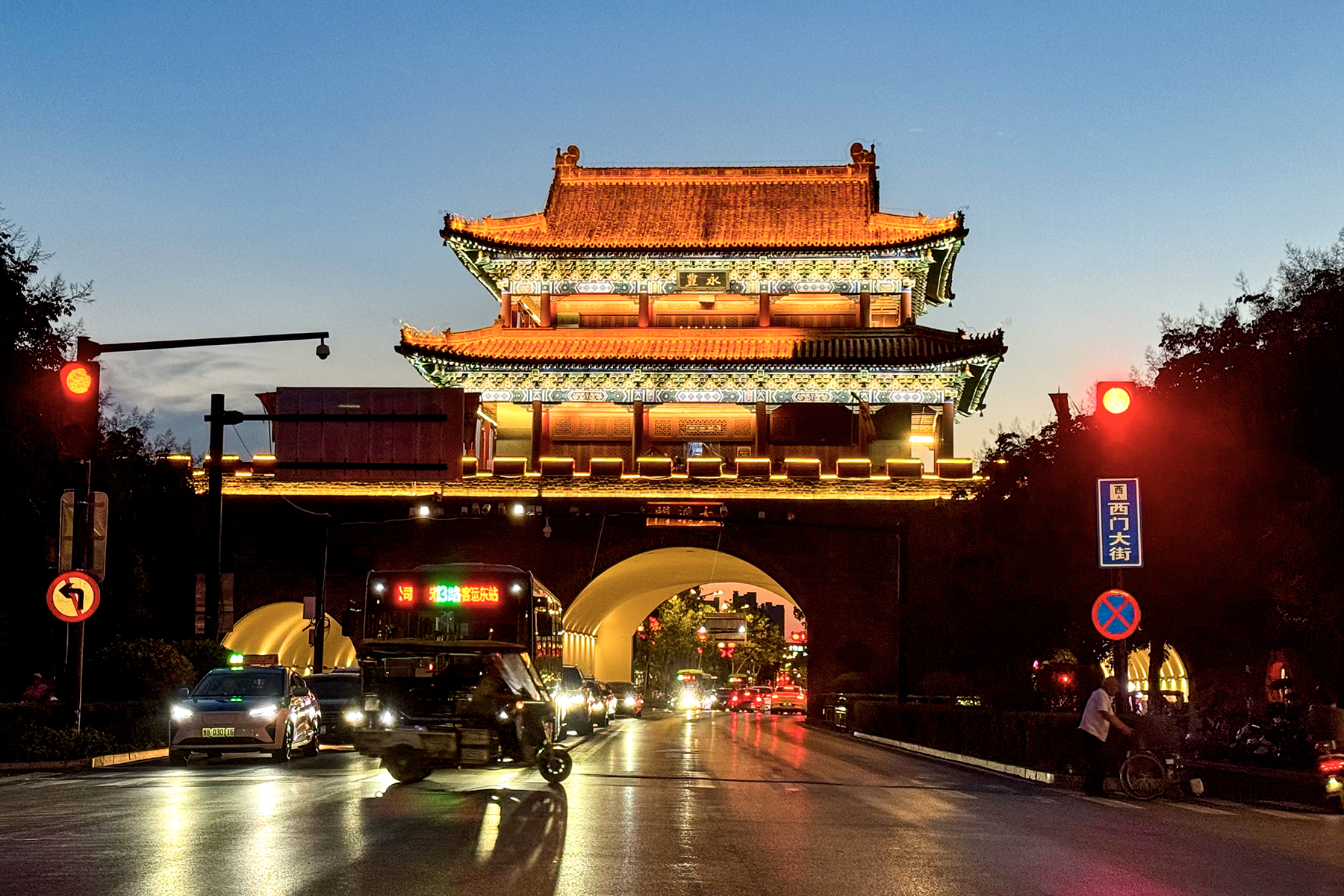
Reconstructed city gate (inner) of Bianjing

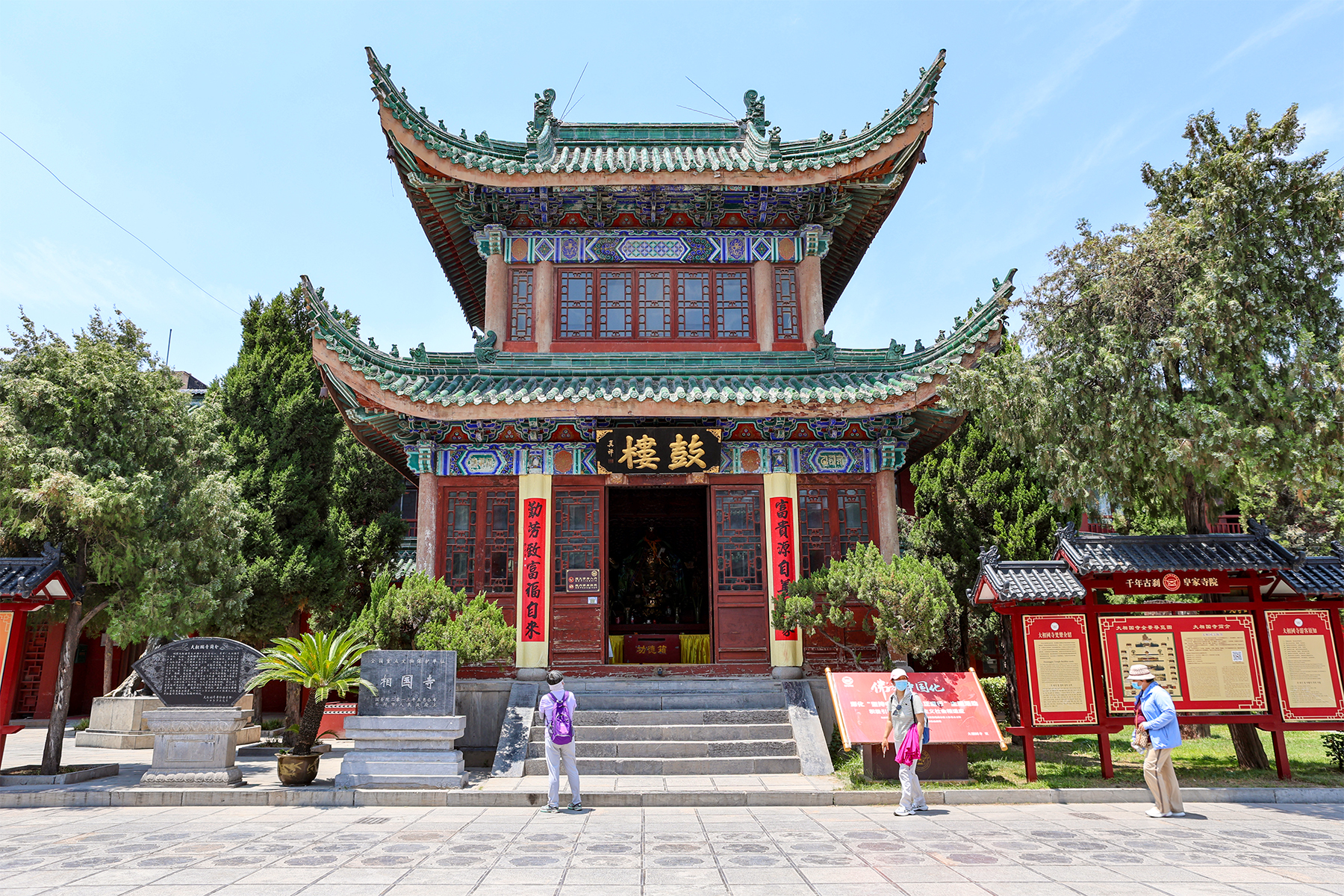
Daxiangguo Temple's drum tower

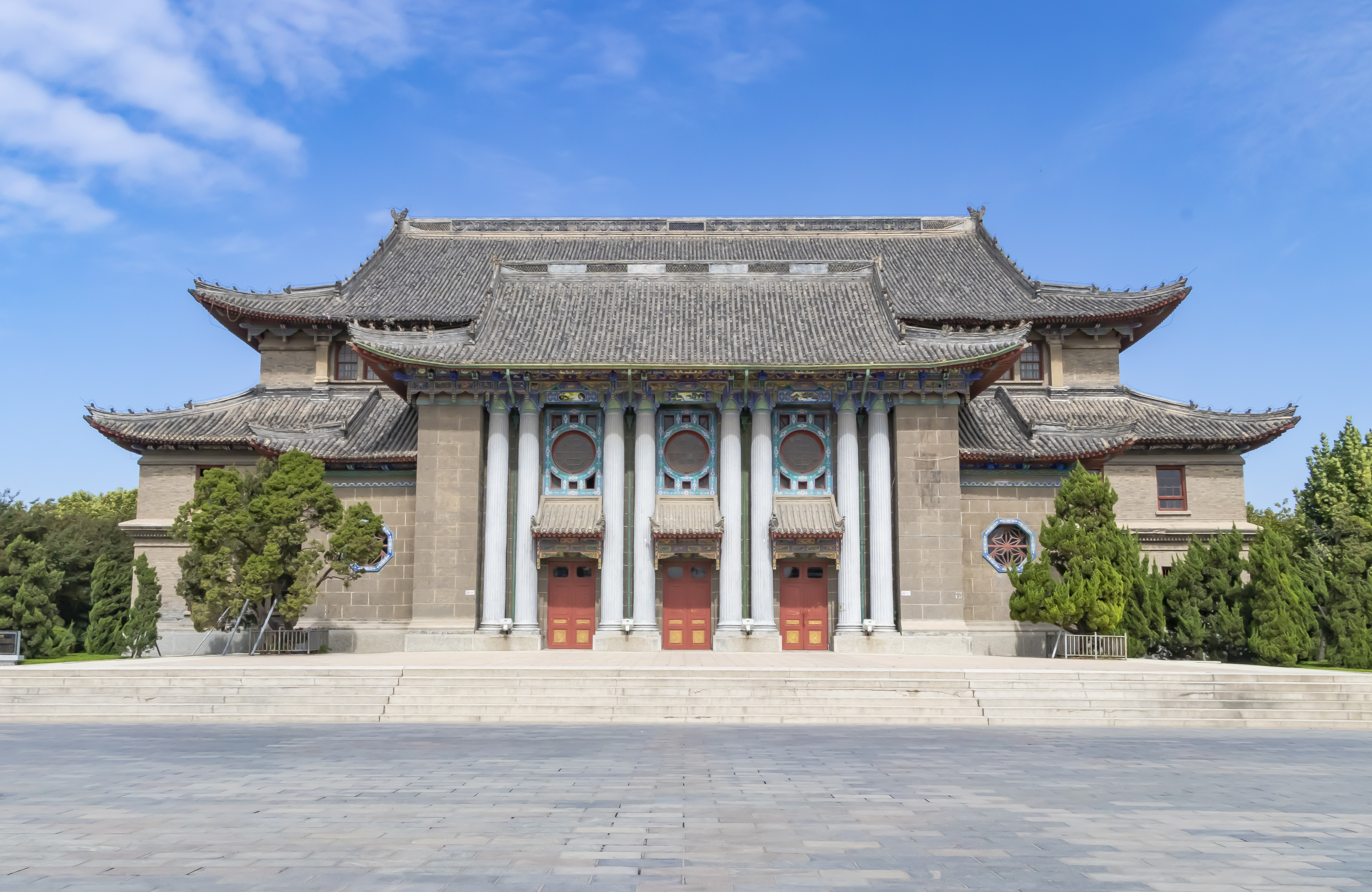
Henan University

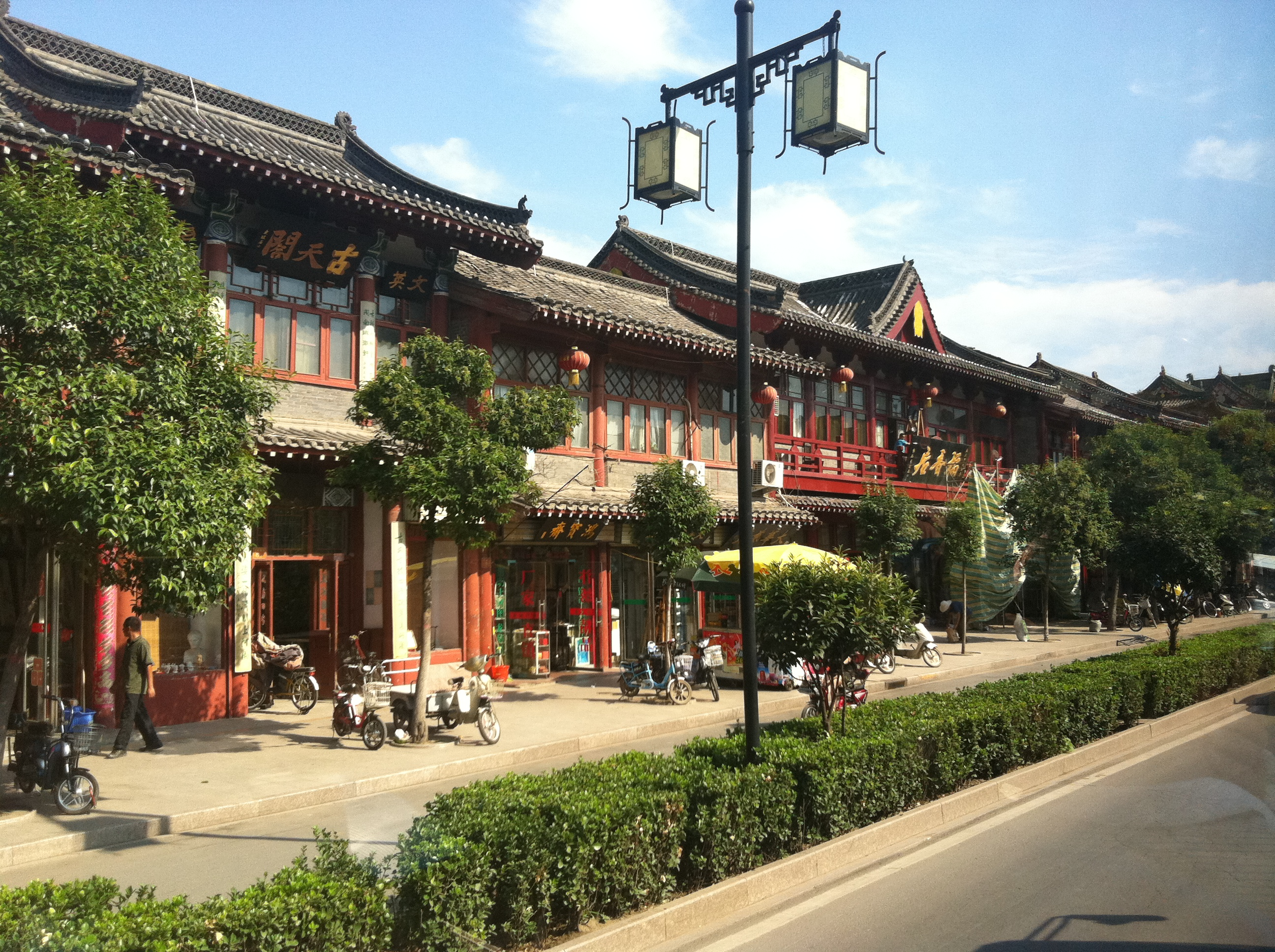
Imperial Street of the Song dynasty

== Twin towns – sister cities ==
Kaifeng is twinned with:

- Kiryat Motzkin, Israel
- Toda, Japan
- Yeongcheon, South Korea
- Wichita, United States
- Omsk, Russia
- Wingecarribee, Australia

== Colleges and universities ==
Kaifeng is also a major city for scientific research, appearing among the world's top 150 cities as tracked by the Nature Index. The city is home to a campus of Henan University, one of the national key universities in the Double First-Class Construction.

=== Public ===
- Henan University (河南大学) (founded 1912)
- Kaifeng University (开封大学) (founded 1980)
- Kaifeng Institute of Education (开封教育学院)
- Yellow River Conservancy Technical Institute (黄河水利职业技术学院) (founded 1929)

== Demographics ==
According to the Seventh National Census in 2020, the city's Permanent Population (hukou) was 4,824,016. Compared with the 4,676,159 people in the Sixth National Census in 2010, the total number of people increased by 147,857 over the decade, an increase of 3.16 percent, with an average annual growth rate of 0.31 percent.

== See also ==
- Historical capitals of China
- 1642 Yellow River flood
- Chinese ship Kaifeng
- Night ride to Kaifeng

Preceded by Chang'an	Capital of China (as Kaifeng); 960−1127	Succeeded by Lin'an
