= List of administrative divisions of Henan =

Administrative divisions of Henan, a province of the People's Republic of China

Henan Province
- Province
- Capital: Zhengzhou

Prefecture-level divisions
- Prefectural cities: 17

County level divisions
- Sub-prefectural cities: 1
- County cities: 21
- Counties: 82
- Districts / ethnic districts: 54

Township level divisions
- Towns: 1180
- Townships: 586
- Ethnic townships / towns^{*}: 21
- Subdistricts: 692

Villages level divisions
- Communities: 4,885
- Administrative villages: 46,741

The administrative divisions of Henan, a province of the People's Republic of China, consists of prefecture-level divisions subdivided into county-level divisions then subdivided into township-level divisions.

== Administrative divisions ==
All of these administrative divisions are explained in greater detail at administrative divisions of China. This chart lists only prefecture-level and county-level divisions of Henan.

Prefecture level	County Level				
Prefecture level	Name	Chinese	Hanyu Pinyin	Division code	
Zhengzhou city 郑州市; Zhèngzhōu Shì (Capital) (4101 / CGO)	Zhongyuan District	中原区	Zhōngyuán Qū	410102	ZYQ
Zhengzhou city 郑州市; Zhèngzhōu Shì (Capital) (4101 / CGO)	Erqi District	二七区	Èrqī Qū	410103	EQQ
Zhengzhou city 郑州市; Zhèngzhōu Shì (Capital) (4101 / CGO)	Guancheng Hui District	管城回族区	Guǎnchéng Huízú Qū	410104	GCH
Zhengzhou city 郑州市; Zhèngzhōu Shì (Capital) (4101 / CGO)	Jinshui District	金水区	Jīnshuǐ Qū	410105	JSU
Zhengzhou city 郑州市; Zhèngzhōu Shì (Capital) (4101 / CGO)	Shangjie District	上街区	Shàngjiē Qū	410106	SJE
Zhengzhou city 郑州市; Zhèngzhōu Shì (Capital) (4101 / CGO)	Huiji District	惠济区	Huìjì Qū	410108	HJU
Zhengzhou city 郑州市; Zhèngzhōu Shì (Capital) (4101 / CGO)	Zhongmu County	中牟县	Zhōngmù Xiàn	410122	ZMU
Zhengzhou city 郑州市; Zhèngzhōu Shì (Capital) (4101 / CGO)	Gongyi city	巩义市	Gǒngyì Shì	410181	GYI
Zhengzhou city 郑州市; Zhèngzhōu Shì (Capital) (4101 / CGO)	Xingyang city	荥阳市	Xíngyáng Shì	410182	XYK
Zhengzhou city 郑州市; Zhèngzhōu Shì (Capital) (4101 / CGO)	Xinmi city	新密市	Xīnmì Shì	410183	XMI
Zhengzhou city 郑州市; Zhèngzhōu Shì (Capital) (4101 / CGO)	Xinzheng city	新郑市	Xīnzhèng Shì	410184	XZG
Zhengzhou city 郑州市; Zhèngzhōu Shì (Capital) (4101 / CGO)	Dengfeng city	登封市	Dēngfēng Shì	410185	DFY
Kaifeng city 开封市; Kāifēng Shì (4102 / KFS)	Longting District	龙亭区	Lóngtíng Qū	410202	LTK
Kaifeng city 开封市; Kāifēng Shì (4102 / KFS)	Shunhe Hui District	顺河回族区	Shùnhé Huízú Qū	410203	SHR
Kaifeng city 开封市; Kāifēng Shì (4102 / KFS)	Gulou District	鼓楼区	Gǔlóu Qū	410204	GLK
Kaifeng city 开封市; Kāifēng Shì (4102 / KFS)	Yuwangtai District	禹王台区	Yǔwángtái Qū	410205	YWT
Kaifeng city 开封市; Kāifēng Shì (4102 / KFS)	Xiangfu District	祥符区	Xiángfú Qū	410212	XFH
Kaifeng city 开封市; Kāifēng Shì (4102 / KFS)	Qixian County (Note: Official name registered by the Ministry of Civil Affairs.)	杞县	Qǐxiàn	410221	QIX
Kaifeng city 开封市; Kāifēng Shì (4102 / KFS)	Tongxu County	通许县	Tōngxǔ Xiàn	410222	TXY
Kaifeng city 开封市; Kāifēng Shì (4102 / KFS)	Weishi County	尉氏县	Wèishì Xiàn	410223	WSI
Kaifeng city 开封市; Kāifēng Shì (4102 / KFS)	Lankao County	兰考县	Lánkǎo Xiàn	410225	LKA
Luoyang city 洛阳市; Luòyáng Shì (4103 / LYA)	Laocheng District	老城区	Lǎochéng Qū	410302	LLY
Luoyang city 洛阳市; Luòyáng Shì (4103 / LYA)	Xigong District	西工区	Xīgōng Qū	410303	XGL
Luoyang city 洛阳市; Luòyáng Shì (4103 / LYA)	Chanhe Hui District	瀍河回族区	Chánhé Huízú Qū	410304	CHH
Luoyang city 洛阳市; Luòyáng Shì (4103 / LYA)	Jianxi District	涧西区	Jiànxī Qū	410305	JXL
Luoyang city 洛阳市; Luòyáng Shì (4103 / LYA)	Yanshi District	偃师区	Yǎnshī Qū	410307	YST
Luoyang city 洛阳市; Luòyáng Shì (4103 / LYA)	Mengjin District	孟津区	Mèngjīn Qū	410308	MGQ
Luoyang city 洛阳市; Luòyáng Shì (4103 / LYA)	Luolong District	洛龙区	Luòlóng Qū	410311	LLQ
Luoyang city 洛阳市; Luòyáng Shì (4103 / LYA)	Xin'an County	新安县	Xīn'ān Xiàn	410323	XAX
Luoyang city 洛阳市; Luòyáng Shì (4103 / LYA)	Luanchuan County	栾川县	Luánchuān Xiàn	410324	LCK
Luoyang city 洛阳市; Luòyáng Shì (4103 / LYA)	Songxian County	嵩县	SōngXiàn	410325	SON
Luoyang city 洛阳市; Luòyáng Shì (4103 / LYA)	Ruyang County	汝阳县	Rǔyáng Xiàn	410326	RUY
Luoyang city 洛阳市; Luòyáng Shì (4103 / LYA)	Yiyang County	宜阳县	Yíyáng Xiàn	410327	YYY
Luoyang city 洛阳市; Luòyáng Shì (4103 / LYA)	Luoning County	洛宁县	Luòníng Xiàn	410328	LNI
Luoyang city 洛阳市; Luòyáng Shì (4103 / LYA)	Yichuan County	伊川县	Yīchuān Xiàn	410329	YCZ
Pingdingshan city 平顶山市; Píngdǐngshān Shì (4104 / PDS)	Xinhua District	新华区	Xīnhuá Qū	410402	XHP
Pingdingshan city 平顶山市; Píngdǐngshān Shì (4104 / PDS)	Weidong District	卫东区	Wèidōng Qū	410403	WDG
Pingdingshan city 平顶山市; Píngdǐngshān Shì (4104 / PDS)	Shilong District	石龙区	Shílóng Qū	410404	SIL
Pingdingshan city 平顶山市; Píngdǐngshān Shì (4104 / PDS)	Zhanhe District	湛河区	Zhànhé Qū	410411	ZHQ
Pingdingshan city 平顶山市; Píngdǐngshān Shì (4104 / PDS)	Baofeng County	宝丰县	Bǎofēng Xiàn	410421	BFG
Pingdingshan city 平顶山市; Píngdǐngshān Shì (4104 / PDS)	Yexian County	叶县	Yèxiàn	410422	YEX
Pingdingshan city 平顶山市; Píngdǐngshān Shì (4104 / PDS)	Lushan County	鲁山县	Lǔshān Xiàn	410423	LUS
Pingdingshan city 平顶山市; Píngdǐngshān Shì (4104 / PDS)	Jiaxian County	郏县	Jiáxiàn	410425	JXY
Pingdingshan city 平顶山市; Píngdǐngshān Shì (4104 / PDS)	Wugang city	舞钢市	Wǔgāng Shì	410481	WGY
Pingdingshan city 平顶山市; Píngdǐngshān Shì (4104 / PDS)	Ruzhou city	汝州市	Rǔzhōu Shì	410482	RZO
Anyang city 安阳市; Ānyáng Shì (4105 / AYS)	Wenfeng District	文峰区	Wénfēng Qū	410502	WFQ
Anyang city 安阳市; Ānyáng Shì (4105 / AYS)	Beiguan District	北关区	Běiguān Qū	410503	BGQ
Anyang city 安阳市; Ānyáng Shì (4105 / AYS)	Yindu District	殷都区	Yīndū Qū	410505	YND
Anyang city 安阳市; Ānyáng Shì (4105 / AYS)	Long'an District	龙安区	Lóng'ān Qū	410506	LAQ
Anyang city 安阳市; Ānyáng Shì (4105 / AYS)	Anyang County	安阳县	Ānyáng Xiàn	410522	AYX
Anyang city 安阳市; Ānyáng Shì (4105 / AYS)	Tangyin County	汤阴县	Tāngyīn Xiàn	410523	TYI
Anyang city 安阳市; Ānyáng Shì (4105 / AYS)	Huaxian County	滑县	Huáxiàn	410526	HUA
Anyang city 安阳市; Ānyáng Shì (4105 / AYS)	Neihuang County	内黄县	Nèihuáng Xiàn	410527	NHG
Anyang city 安阳市; Ānyáng Shì (4105 / AYS)	Linzhou city	林州市	Línzhōu Shì	410581	LZY
Hebi city 鹤壁市; Hèbì Shì (4106 / HBS)	Heshan District	鹤山区	Hèshān Qū	410602	HSF
Hebi city 鹤壁市; Hèbì Shì (4106 / HBS)	Shancheng District	山城区	Shānchéng Qū	410603	SCB
Hebi city 鹤壁市; Hèbì Shì (4106 / HBS)	Qibin District	淇滨区	Qíbīn Qū	410611	QBN
Hebi city 鹤壁市; Hèbì Shì (4106 / HBS)	Xunxian County	浚县	Xùnxiàn	410621	XUX
Hebi city 鹤壁市; Hèbì Shì (4106 / HBS)	Qixian County	淇县	Qíxiàn	410622	QXY
Xinxiang city 新乡市; Xīnxiāng Shì (4107 / XXS)	Hongqi District	红旗区	Hóngqí Qū	410702	HQQ
Xinxiang city 新乡市; Xīnxiāng Shì (4107 / XXS)	Weibin District	卫滨区	Wèibīn Qū	410703	WEQ
Xinxiang city 新乡市; Xīnxiāng Shì (4107 / XXS)	Fengquan District	凤泉区	Fèngquán Qū	410704	FQQ
Xinxiang city 新乡市; Xīnxiāng Shì (4107 / XXS)	Muye District	牧野区	Mùyě Qū	410711	MYQ
Xinxiang city 新乡市; Xīnxiāng Shì (4107 / XXS)	Xinxiang County	新乡县	Xīnxiāng Xiàn	410721	XXX
Xinxiang city 新乡市; Xīnxiāng Shì (4107 / XXS)	Huojia County	获嘉县	Huòjiā Xiàn	410724	HOJ
Xinxiang city 新乡市; Xīnxiāng Shì (4107 / XXS)	Yuanyang County	原阳县	Yuányáng Xiàn	410725	YYA
Xinxiang city 新乡市; Xīnxiāng Shì (4107 / XXS)	Yanjin County	延津县	Yánjīn Xiàn	410726	YJN
Xinxiang city 新乡市; Xīnxiāng Shì (4107 / XXS)	Fengqiu County	封丘县	Fēngqiū Xiàn	410727	FQU
Xinxiang city 新乡市; Xīnxiāng Shì (4107 / XXS)	Weihui city	卫辉市	Wèihuī Shì	410781	CYU
Xinxiang city 新乡市; Xīnxiāng Shì (4107 / XXS)	Huixian city	辉县市	Huīxiàn Shì	410782	WHS
Xinxiang city 新乡市; Xīnxiāng Shì (4107 / XXS)	Changyuan	长垣市	Chángyuán shì	410783	HXS
Jiaozuo city 焦作市; Jiāozuò Shì (4108 / JZY)	Jiefang District	解放区	Jiěfàng Qū	410802	JFQ
Jiaozuo city 焦作市; Jiāozuò Shì (4108 / JZY)	Zhongzhan District	中站区	Zhōngzhàn Qū	410803	ZZQ
Jiaozuo city 焦作市; Jiāozuò Shì (4108 / JZY)	Macun District	马村区	Mǎcūn Qū	410804	MCQ
Jiaozuo city 焦作市; Jiāozuò Shì (4108 / JZY)	Shanyang District	山阳区	Shānyáng Qū	410811	SYC
Jiaozuo city 焦作市; Jiāozuò Shì (4108 / JZY)	Xiuwu County	修武县	Xiūwǔ Xiàn	410821	XUW
Jiaozuo city 焦作市; Jiāozuò Shì (4108 / JZY)	Bo'ai County	博爱县	Bó'ài Xiàn	410822	BOA
Jiaozuo city 焦作市; Jiāozuò Shì (4108 / JZY)	Wuzhi County	武陟县	Wǔzhì Xiàn	410823	WZI
Jiaozuo city 焦作市; Jiāozuò Shì (4108 / JZY)	Wenxian County	温县	Wēnxiàn	410825	WEN
Jiaozuo city 焦作市; Jiāozuò Shì (4108 / JZY)	Qinyang city	沁阳市	Qìnyáng Shì	410882	QYS
Jiaozuo city 焦作市; Jiāozuò Shì (4108 / JZY)	Mengzhou city	孟州市	Mèngzhōu Shì	410883	MZO
Puyang city 濮阳市; Púyáng Shì (4109 / PYS)	Hualong District	华龙区	Huálóng Qū	410902	HAL
Puyang city 濮阳市; Púyáng Shì (4109 / PYS)	Qingfeng County	清丰县	Qīngfēng Xiàn	410922	QFG
Puyang city 濮阳市; Púyáng Shì (4109 / PYS)	Nanle County	南乐县	Nánlè Xiàn	410923	NLE
Puyang city 濮阳市; Púyáng Shì (4109 / PYS)	Fanxian County	范县	Fànxiàn	410926	FAX
Puyang city 濮阳市; Púyáng Shì (4109 / PYS)	Taiqian County	台前县	Táiqián Xiàn	410927	TQN
Puyang city 濮阳市; Púyáng Shì (4109 / PYS)	Puyang County	濮阳县	Púyáng Xiàn	410928	PUY
Xuchang city 许昌市; Xǔchāng Shì (4110 / XCS)	Weidu District	魏都区	Wèidū Qū	411002	WED
Xuchang city 许昌市; Xǔchāng Shì (4110 / XCS)	Jian'an District	建安区	Jiàn'ān Qū	411003	JAN
Xuchang city 许昌市; Xǔchāng Shì (4110 / XCS)	Yanling County	鄢陵县	Yānlíng Xiàn	411024	YLY
Xuchang city 许昌市; Xǔchāng Shì (4110 / XCS)	Xiangcheng County	襄城县	Xiāngchéng Xiàn	411025	XAC
Xuchang city 许昌市; Xǔchāng Shì (4110 / XCS)	Yuzhou city	禹州市	Yǔzhōu Shì	411081	YUZ
Xuchang city 许昌市; Xǔchāng Shì (4110 / XCS)	Changge city	长葛市	Chánggě Shì	411082	CGE
Luohe city 漯河市; Luòhé Shì (4111 / LHS)	Yuanhui District	源汇区	Yuánhuì Qū	411102	YHI
Luohe city 漯河市; Luòhé Shì (4111 / LHS)	Yancheng District	郾城区	Yǎnchéng Qū	411103	YNC
Luohe city 漯河市; Luòhé Shì (4111 / LHS)	Shaoling District	召陵区	Shàolíng Qū	411104	SOL
Luohe city 漯河市; Luòhé Shì (4111 / LHS)	Wuyang County	舞阳县	Wǔyáng Xiàn	411121	WYG
Luohe city 漯河市; Luòhé Shì (4111 / LHS)	Linying County	临颍县	Línyǐng Xiàn	411122	LNY
Sanmenxia city 三门峡市; Sānménxiá Shì (4112 / SMX)	Hubin District	湖滨区	Húbīn Qū	411202	HBI
Sanmenxia city 三门峡市; Sānménxiá Shì (4112 / SMX)	Shanzhou District	陕州区	Shǎnzhōu Qū	411203	SZC
Sanmenxia city 三门峡市; Sānménxiá Shì (4112 / SMX)	Mianchi County	渑池县	Miǎnchí Xiàn	411221	MCI
Sanmenxia city 三门峡市; Sānménxiá Shì (4112 / SMX)	Lushi County	卢氏县	Lúshì Xiàn	411224	LUU
Sanmenxia city 三门峡市; Sānménxiá Shì (4112 / SMX)	Yima city	义马市	Yìmǎ Shì	411281	YMA
Sanmenxia city 三门峡市; Sānménxiá Shì (4112 / SMX)	Lingbao city	灵宝市	Língbǎo Shì	411282	LBS
Nanyang city 南阳市; Nányáng Shì (4113 / NYS)	Wancheng District	宛城区	Wǎnchéng Qū	411302	WCN
Nanyang city 南阳市; Nányáng Shì (4113 / NYS)	Wolong District	卧龙区	Wòlóng Qū	411303	WOL
Nanyang city 南阳市; Nányáng Shì (4113 / NYS)	Nanzhao County	南召县	Nánzhào Xiàn	411321	NZO
Nanyang city 南阳市; Nányáng Shì (4113 / NYS)	Fangcheng County	方城县	Fāngchéng Xiàn	411322	FCX
Nanyang city 南阳市; Nányáng Shì (4113 / NYS)	Xixia County	西峡县	Xīxiá Xiàn	411323	XXY
Nanyang city 南阳市; Nányáng Shì (4113 / NYS)	Zhenping County	镇平县	Zhènpíng Xiàn	411324	ZPX
Nanyang city 南阳市; Nányáng Shì (4113 / NYS)	Neixiang County	内乡县	Nèixiāng Xiàn	411325	NXG
Nanyang city 南阳市; Nányáng Shì (4113 / NYS)	Xichuan County	淅川县	Xīchuān Xiàn	411326	XCY
Nanyang city 南阳市; Nányáng Shì (4113 / NYS)	Sheqi County	社旗县	Shèqí Xiàn	411327	SEQ
Nanyang city 南阳市; Nányáng Shì (4113 / NYS)	Tanghe County	唐河县	Tánghé Xiàn	411328	TGH
Nanyang city 南阳市; Nányáng Shì (4113 / NYS)	Xinye County	新野县	Xīnyě Xiàn	411329	XYE
Nanyang city 南阳市; Nányáng Shì (4113 / NYS)	Tongbai County	桐柏县	Tóngbǎi Xiàn	411330	TBX
Nanyang city 南阳市; Nányáng Shì (4113 / NYS)	Dengzhou city	邓州市	Dèngzhōu Shì	411381	DGZ
Shangqiu city 商丘市; Shāngqiū Shì (4114 / SQS)	Liangyuan District	梁园区	Liángyuán Qū	411402	LYY
Shangqiu city 商丘市; Shāngqiū Shì (4114 / SQS)	Suiyang District	睢阳区	Suīyáng Qū	411403	SYA
Shangqiu city 商丘市; Shāngqiū Shì (4114 / SQS)	Minquan County	民权县	Mínquán Xiàn	411421	MQY
Shangqiu city 商丘市; Shāngqiū Shì (4114 / SQS)	Suixian County	睢县	Suīxiàn	411422	SUI
Shangqiu city 商丘市; Shāngqiū Shì (4114 / SQS)	Ningling County	宁陵县	Nínglíng Xiàn	411423	NGL
Shangqiu city 商丘市; Shāngqiū Shì (4114 / SQS)	Zhecheng County	柘城县	Zhèchéng Xiàn (Note: not Tuòchéng)	411424	ZHC
Shangqiu city 商丘市; Shāngqiū Shì (4114 / SQS)	Yucheng County	虞城县	Yúchéng Xiàn	411425	YUC
Shangqiu city 商丘市; Shāngqiū Shì (4114 / SQS)	Xiayi County	夏邑县	Xiàyì Xiàn	411426	XAY
Shangqiu city 商丘市; Shāngqiū Shì (4114 / SQS)	Yongcheng city	永城市	Yǒngchéng Shì	411481	YOC
Xinyang city 信阳市; Xìnyáng Shì (4115 / XYG)	Shihe District	浉河区	Shīhé Qū	411502	SHU
Xinyang city 信阳市; Xìnyáng Shì (4115 / XYG)	Pingqiao District	平桥区	Píngqiáo Qū	411503	PQQ
Xinyang city 信阳市; Xìnyáng Shì (4115 / XYG)	Luoshan County	罗山县	Luóshān Xiàn	411521	LSE
Xinyang city 信阳市; Xìnyáng Shì (4115 / XYG)	Guangshan County	光山县	Guāngshān Xiàn	411522	GSX
Xinyang city 信阳市; Xìnyáng Shì (4115 / XYG)	Xinxian County	新县	Xīnxiàn	411523	XXI
Xinyang city 信阳市; Xìnyáng Shì (4115 / XYG)	Shangcheng County	商城县	Shāngchéng Xiàn	411524	SCX
Xinyang city 信阳市; Xìnyáng Shì (4115 / XYG)	Gushi County	固始县	Gùshǐ Xiàn	411525	GSI
Xinyang city 信阳市; Xìnyáng Shì (4115 / XYG)	Huangchuan County	潢川县	Huángchuān Xiàn	411526	HCU
Xinyang city 信阳市; Xìnyáng Shì (4115 / XYG)	Huaibin County	淮滨县	Huáibīn Xiàn	411527	HBN
Xinyang city 信阳市; Xìnyáng Shì (4115 / XYG)	Xixian County	息县	Xīxiàn	411528	XIX
Zhoukou city 周口市; Zhōukǒu Shì (4116 / ZKS)	Chuanhui District	川汇区	Chuānhuì Qū	411602	CIQ
Zhoukou city 周口市; Zhōukǒu Shì (4116 / ZKS)	Huaiyang District	淮阳区	Huáiyáng Qū	411603	FUG
Zhoukou city 周口市; Zhōukǒu Shì (4116 / ZKS)	Fugou County	扶沟县	Fúgōu Xiàn	411621	XIH
Zhoukou city 周口市; Zhōukǒu Shì (4116 / ZKS)	Xihua County	西华县	Xīhuá Xiàn	411622	SSU
Zhoukou city 周口市; Zhōukǒu Shì (4116 / ZKS)	Shangshui County	商水县	Shāngshuǐ Xiàn	411623	SQU
Zhoukou city 周口市; Zhōukǒu Shì (4116 / ZKS)	Shenqiu County	沈丘县	Shěnqiū Xiàn	411624	DNC
Zhoukou city 周口市; Zhōukǒu Shì (4116 / ZKS)	Dancheng County	郸城县	Dānchéng Xiàn	411625	HYG
Zhoukou city 周口市; Zhōukǒu Shì (4116 / ZKS)	Taikang County	太康县	Tàikāng Xiàn	411627	TKG
Zhoukou city 周口市; Zhōukǒu Shì (4116 / ZKS)	Luyi County	鹿邑县	Lùyì Xiàn	411628	LUY
Zhoukou city 周口市; Zhōukǒu Shì (4116 / ZKS)	Xiangcheng city	项城市	Xiàngchéng Shì	411681	XGC
Zhumadian city 驻马店市; Zhùmǎdiàn Shì (4117 / ZMD)	Yicheng District	驿城区	Yìchéng Qū	411702	YEQ
Zhumadian city 驻马店市; Zhùmǎdiàn Shì (4117 / ZMD)	Xiping County	西平县	Xīpíng Xiàn	411721	XIP
Zhumadian city 驻马店市; Zhùmǎdiàn Shì (4117 / ZMD)	Shangcai County	上蔡县	Shàngcài Xiàn	411722	SGC
Zhumadian city 驻马店市; Zhùmǎdiàn Shì (4117 / ZMD)	Pingyu County	平舆县	Píngyú Xiàn	411723	PYX
Zhumadian city 驻马店市; Zhùmǎdiàn Shì (4117 / ZMD)	Zhengyang County	正阳县	Zhèngyáng Xiàn	411724	ZGY
Zhumadian city 驻马店市; Zhùmǎdiàn Shì (4117 / ZMD)	Queshan County	确山县	Quèshān Xiàn	411725	QSA
Zhumadian city 驻马店市; Zhùmǎdiàn Shì (4117 / ZMD)	Biyang County	泌阳县	Bìyáng Xiàn	411726	BYY
Zhumadian city 驻马店市; Zhùmǎdiàn Shì (4117 / ZMD)	Runan County	汝南县	Rǔnán Xiàn	411727	RNN
Zhumadian city 驻马店市; Zhùmǎdiàn Shì (4117 / ZMD)	Suiping County	遂平县	Suípíng Xiàn	411728	SUP
Zhumadian city 驻马店市; Zhùmǎdiàn Shì (4117 / ZMD)	Xincai County	新蔡县	Xīncài Xiàn	411729	XNC
Directly administered (4190)	Jiyuan city	济源市	Jìyuán Shì	419001	JYY

== Recent changes in administrative divisions ==
Date	Before	After	Note	Reference
1980-08-18	parts of Shangqiu Prefecture	Kaifeng Prefecture	transferred	
1980-08-18	↳ Lankao County	↳ Lankao County	transferred	
1980-09-26	Zhoukou County	Zhoukou (PC-City)	reorganized	
1980-09-26	Zhumadian (CC-Town)	Zhumadian (PC-City)	reorganized	
1981-04-04	Yima Kuang District	Yima (PC-City)	reorganized	
1981-12-25	parts of Jiao District, Zhengzhou	Jinhai District	reorganized	
1982-01-30	Luobei District	Laocheng District	renamed	
1982-03-10	parts of Xinxiang Prefecture	Xinxiang (P-City)	established	
1982-03-10	↳ Xinxiang (PC-City)	Xinxiang (P-City)	transferred	
1982-04-08	parts of Jiao District, Xinxiang	Beizhan District	established	
1982-08-13	parts of Luoyang Prefecture	Luoyang (P-City)	transferred	
1982-08-13	↳ parts of Meng County	↳ Jili District	transferred & established	
1982-08-13	↳ parts of Jiyuan County	↳ Jili District	transferred & established	
1982-08-13	parts of Kaifeng Prefecture	Zhengzhou (P-City)	transferred	
1982-08-13	↳ parts of Mi County	↳ Xinmi District	transferred & established	
1983-01-18	all Province-controlled city (P-City) → Prefecture-level city (PL-City)			Civil Affairs Announcement
1983-01-18	all Prefecture-controlled city (PC-City) → County-level city (CL-City)			Civil Affairs Announcement
1983-04-28	Xiangyang Hui District	Guancheng Hui District	renamed	
1983-09-01	Kaifeng Prefecture	Kaifeng (PL-City)	merged into	
1983-09-01	Kaifeng Prefecture	Zhengzhou (P-City)	transferred	
1983-09-01	↳ Gong County	↳ Gong County	transferred	
1983-09-01	↳ Xinzheng County	↳ Xinzheng County	transferred	
1983-09-01	↳ Mi County	↳ Mi County	transferred	
1983-09-01	↳ Dengfeng County	↳ Dengfeng County	transferred	
1983-09-01	↳ Zhongmu County	↳ Zhongmu County	transferred	
1983-09-01	Anyang Prefecture	Anyang (PL-City)	merged into	
1983-09-01	Anyang Prefecture	Puyang (PL-City) city district	established	
1983-09-01	↳ Puyang County	Puyang (PL-City) city district	transferred	
1983-09-01	↳ Neihuang County	↳ Neihuang County	transferred	
1983-09-01	↳ Hua County	↳ Hua County	transferred	
1983-09-01	↳ Qingfeng County	↳ Qingfeng County	transferred	
1983-09-01	↳ Nanle County	↳ Nanle County	transferred	
1983-09-01	↳ Changyuan County	↳ Changyuan County	transferred	
1983-09-01	↳ Fan County	↳ Fan County	transferred	
1983-09-01	↳ Taiqian County	↳ Taiqian County	transferred	
1983-09-01	parts of Xuchang Prefecture	Pingdingshan (PL-City)	transferred	
1983-09-01	↳ Baofeng County	↳ Baofeng County	transferred	
1983-09-01	↳ Lushan County	↳ Lushan County	transferred	
1983-09-01	↳ Ye County	↳ Ye County	transferred	
1983-09-01	parts of Luoyang Prefecture	Luoyang (PL-City)	transferred	
1983-09-01	↳ Xin'an County	↳ Xin'an County	transferred	
1983-09-01	↳ Yanshi County	↳ Yanshi County	transferred	
1983-09-01	↳ Mengjin County	↳ Mengjin County	transferred	
1983-09-01	parts of Xinxiang Prefecture	Xinxiang (PL-City)	transferred	
1983-09-01	↳ Ji County	↳ Ji County	transferred	
1983-09-01	↳ Xinxiang County	↳ Xinxiang County	transferred	
1983-09-01	parts of Xinxiang Prefecture	Jiaozuo (PL-City)	transferred	
1983-09-01	↳ Xiuwu County	↳ Xiuwu County	transferred	
1983-09-01	↳ Bo'ai County	↳ Bo'ai County	transferred	
1985-12-30	Puyang (PL-City) city district	Shi District, Puyang	established	
1985-12-30	Puyang (PL-City) city district	Jiao District, Puyang	established	
1986-01-18	Xinxiang Prefecture	Xinxiang (PL-City)	merged into	
1986-01-18	Xinxiang Prefecture	Jiaozuo (PL-City)	transferred	
1986-01-18	↳ Wushe County	↳ Wushe County	transferred	
1986-01-18	↳ Wen County	↳ Wen County	transferred	
1986-01-18	↳ Biyang County	↳ Biyang County	transferred	
1986-01-18	↳ Meng County	↳ Meng County	transferred	
1986-01-18	↳ Jiyuan County	↳ Jiyuan County	transferred	
1986-01-18	Xuchang Prefecture	Xuchang (PL-City) city district	reorganized	
1986-01-18	↳ Xuchang (CL-City)	Xuchang (PL-City) city district	disestablished	
1986-01-18	parts of Xuchang Prefecture	Luohe (PL-City) city district	established & transferred	
1986-01-18	↳ Luohe (CL-City)	Luohe (PL-City) city district	disestablished	
1986-01-18	↳ Wuyang County	↳ Wuyang County	transferred	
1986-01-18	↳ Linying County	↳ Linying County	transferred	
1986-01-18	↳ Yanshi County	↳ Yanshi County	transferred	
1986-01-18	parts of Xuchang Prefecture	Pingdingshan (PL-City) city district	transferred	
1986-01-18	↳ Jia County	↳ Jia County	transferred	
1986-01-18	↳ Xiangcheng County	↳ Xiangcheng County	transferred	
1986-01-18	Luoyang Prefecture	Luoyang (PL-City)	merged into	
1986-01-18	Luoyang Prefecture	Sanmenxia (PL-City) city district	established	
1986-01-18	↳ Sanmenxia (CL-City)	Sanmenxia (PL-City) city district	disestablished	
1986-01-18	↳ Mianchi County	↳ Mianchi County	transferred	
1986-01-18	↳ Shan County	↳ Shan County	transferred	
1986-01-18	↳ Lingbao County	↳ Lingbao County	transferred	
1986-01-18	↳ Lushi County	↳ Lushi County	transferred	
1986-01-18	parts of Luoyang Prefecture	Pingdingshan (PL-City) city district	transferred	
1986-01-18	↳ Linru County	↳ Linru County	transferred	
1986-01-18	parts of Anyang (PL-City)	Hebi (PL-City)	transferred	
1986-01-18	↳ Xun County	↳ Xun County	transferred	
1986-01-18	↳ Qi County	↳ Qi County	transferred	
1986-01-18	parts of Puyang (PL-City)	Anyang (PL-City)	transferred	
1986-01-18	↳ Hua County	↳ Hua County	transferred	
1986-01-18	↳ Neihuan County	↳ Neihuan County	transferred	
1986-01-18	parts of Puyang (PL-City)	Xinxiang (PL-City)	transferred	
1986-01-18	↳ Changyuan County	↳ Changyuan County	transferred	
1986-05-09	Xuchang (PL-City) city district	Weidu District	established	
1986-05-09	Luohe (PL-City) city district	Yuanhui District	established	
1986-05-09	Sanmenxia (PL-City) city district	Hubin District	established	
1987-04-20	Jiao District, Puyang	Puyang County	reorganized	
1987-07-01	Xinmi District	Mi County	merged into	
1987-07-01	Jinhai District	Mi County	merged into	
1987-07-01	Jiao District, Zhengzhou	Mi County	merged into	
1988-06-25	Linru County	Ruzhou (CL-City)	reorganized	
1988-06-25	Jiyuan County	Jiyuan (CL-City)	reorganized	
1988-06-25	Yu County	Yuzhou (CL-City)	reorganized	
1988-10-08	Ji County	Weihui (CL-City)	reorganized	
1988-10-11	Huixian County	Huixian (CL-City)	reorganized	
1988-11-17	Deng County	Dengzhou (CL-City)	reorganized	
1989-09-27	Qinyang County	Qinyang (CL-City)	reorganized	
1990-09-04	Wugang County	Wugang (CL-City)	reorganized	
1990-12-27	Jiao District, Jiaozuo	Shanyang District	renamed	
1991-06-12	Gong County	Gongyi (CL-City)	reorganized	Civil Affairs [1991]13
1993-05-12	Lingbao County	Lingbao (CL-City)	reorganized	Civil Affairs [1993]92
1993-12-14	Changge County	Changge (CL-City)	reorganized	Civil Affairs [1993]245
1993-12-15	Yanshi County	Yanshi (CL-City)	reorganized	Civil Affairs [1993]246
1993-12-16	Xiangcheng County	Xiangcheng (CL-City)	reorganized	Civil Affairs [1993]247
1994-01-24	Lin County	Linzhou (CL-City)	reorganized	Civil Affairs [1994]25
1994-04-05	Mi County	Xinmi (CL-City)	reorganized	Civil Affairs [1994]51
1994-04-05	Xingyang County	Xingyang (CL-City)	reorganized	Civil Affairs [1994]52
1994-05-16	Xinzheng County	Xinzheng (CL-City)	reorganized	Civil Affairs [1994]79
1994-05-30	Dengfeng County	Dengfeng (CL-City)	reorganized	Civil Affairs [1994]85
1994-07-01	Nanyang Prefecture	Nanyang (PL-City)	reorganized	State Council [1994]67
1994-07-01	Nanyang (CL-City)	Wancheng District	reorganized	State Council [1994]67
1994-07-01	Nanyang (CL-City)	Wolong District	reorganized	State Council [1994]67
1994-07-01	Nanyang County	Wancheng District	disestablished & merged into	State Council [1994]67
1994-07-01	Nanyang County	Wolong District	disestablished & merged into	State Council [1994]67
1994-08-10	Jiao District, Pingdingshan	Zhanhe District	renamed	Civil Affairs [1994]118
1996-04-29	Meng County	Mengzhou (CL-City)	reorganized	Civil Affairs [1996]30
1996-10-11	Yongcheng County	Yongcheng (CL-City)	reorganized	Civil Affairs [1996]76
1997-06-01	Shangqiu Prefecture	Shangqiu (PL-City)	reorganized	State Council [1997]46
1997-06-01	Shangqiu (CL-City)	Liangyuan District	reorganized	State Council [1997]46
1997-06-01	Shangqiu (CL-City)	Suiyang District	reorganized	State Council [1997]46
1997-06-01	Shangqiu County	Liangyuan District	disestablished & merged into	State Council [1997]46
1997-06-01	Shangqiu County	Suiyang District	disestablished & merged into	State Council [1997]46
1996-04-29	parts of Pingdingshan (PL-City)	Xuchang (PL-City)	transferred	State Council [1997]70
1996-04-29	↳ Xiangcheng County	↳ Xiangcheng County	transferred	State Council [1997]70
1996-12-20	parts of Jiaozuo (PL-City)	provincial controlled	transferred	Henan Doc. [1996]89
1996-12-20	↳ Jiyuan (CL-City)	↳ Jiyuan (CL-City)	transferred	Henan Doc. [1996]89
1997-12-18	parts of Baofeng County	Shilong District	established	State Council [1997]111
1998-06-09	Xinyang Prefecture	Xinyang (PL-City)	reorganized	State Council [1998]44
1998-06-09	Xinyang (CL-City)	Shihe District	reorganized	State Council [1998]44
1998-06-09	Xinyang (CL-City)	Pingqiao District	reorganized	State Council [1998]44
1998-06-09	Xinyang County	Shihe District	disestablished & merged into	State Council [1998]44
1998-06-09	Xinyang County	Pingqiao District	disestablished & merged into	State Council [1998]44
2000-05-20	Jiao District, Luoyang	Luolong District	renamed	State Council [2000]45
2000-06-08	Zhoukou Prefecture	Zhoukou (PL-City)	reorganized	State Council [2000]61
2000-06-08	Zhoukou (CL-City)	Chuanhui District	reorganized	State Council [2000]61
2000-06-08	Zhumadian Prefecture	Zhumadian (PL-City)	reorganized	State Council [2000]62
2000-06-08	Zhumadian (CL-City)	Yicheng District	reorganized	State Council [2000]62
2001-12-26	Jiao District, Hebi	Qibin District	renamed	State Council [2001]173
2002-12-25	Shi District	Hualong District	renamed	Civil Affairs [2002]222
2002-12-28	Tiexi District	Yindu District	renamed	State Council [2002]123
2002-12-28	Jiao District, Anyang	Long'an District	renamed	State Council [2002]123
2003-12-25	Xinhua District	Weibin District	renamed	State Council [2003]134
2003-12-25	Beizhan District	Fengquan District	renamed	State Council [2003]134
2003-12-25	Jiao District, Xinxiang	Muye District	renamed	State Council [2003]134
2003-12-25	Mangshan District	Huiji District	renamed	State Council [2003]270
2004-09-07	Yancheng County	Yancheng District	disestablished & established	State Council [2004]69
2004-09-07	Yancheng County	Shaoling District	disestablished & established	State Council [2004]69
2005-05-30	Jiao District, Kaifeng	Shunhe Hui District	disestablished & merged into	State Council [2005]44
2005-05-30	Jiao District, Kaifeng	Jinming District	disestablished & merged into	State Council [2005]44
2005-05-30	Nanguan District	Gulou District	disestablished & merged into	State Council [2005]44
2005-05-30	Nanguan District	Yuwangtai District	disestablished & established	State Council [2005]44
2005-05-30	Nanguan District	Jinming District	disestablished & established	State Council [2005]44
2014-09-09	Jinming District	Longting District	merged into	State Council [2014]121
2014-09-09	Kaifeng County	Xiangfu District	reorganized	State Council [2014]121
2015-02-16	Shan County	Shanzhou District	reorganized	State Council [2015]39
2016-11-24	Xuchang County	Jian'an District	reorganized	State Council [2016]189
2019-06-27	Huaiyang County	Huaiyang District	reorganized	State Council [2019]61
2019-07-12	Changyuan County	Changyuan (CL-City)	reorganized	Civil Affairs [2019]74

== Population composition ==
=== Prefectures ===
Prefecture	2010	2000
Zhengzhou	8,626,505	6,659,000
Anyang	5,172,834	5,161,106
Hebi	1,569,100	1,401,900
Jiaozuo	3,539,860	3,288,816
Kaifeng	4,676,159	4,580,000
Luohe	2,544,103	2,260,000
Luoyang	6,549,486	6,227,665
Nanyang	2,233,872	2,176,123
Pingdingshan	4,904,367	4,798,000
Puyang	3,598,494	3,458,700
Sanmenxia	2,234,018	?
Shangqiu	7,362,472	6,971,944
Xinxiang	5,707,801	5,408,000
Xinyang	6,108,683	6,526,000
Xuchang	4,307,199	4,118,000
Zhoukou	8,953,172	
Zhumadian	7,230,744	7,007,488

=== Counties ===
Name	Prefecture	2010
Zhongyuan	Zhengzhou	905,430
Erqi	Zhengzhou	712,597
Guancheng	Zhengzhou	645,888
Jinshui	Zhengzhou	1,588,611
Shangjie	Zhengzhou	131,540
Huiji	Zhengzhou	269,561
Zhongmu	Zhengzhou	727,389
Gongyi	Zhengzhou	807,857
Xingyang	Zhengzhou	613,761
Xinmi	Zhengzhou	797,200
Xinzheng	Zhengzhou	758,079
Dengfeng	Zhengzhou	668,592
Longting	Kaifeng	390,017
Shunhe	Kaifeng	232,280
Gulou	Kaifeng	143,165
Yuwangtai	Kaifeng	130,595
Xiangfu	Kaifeng	698,751
Qi(xian)	Kaifeng	956,465
Tongxu	Kaifeng	567,457
Weishi	Kaifeng	879,651
Lankao	Kaifeng	677,778
Laocheng	Luoyang	163,165
Xigong	Luoyang	372,917
Chanhe	Luoyang	177,927
Jianxi	Luoyang	619,178
Jili	Luoyang	69,071
Luolong	Luoyang	523,690
Mengjin	Luoyang	414,609
Xin'an	Luoyang	470,166
Luanchuan	Luoyang	342,823
Song(xian)	Luoyang	507,013
Ruyang	Luoyang	407,981
Yiyang	Luoyang	636,447
Luoning	Luoyang	421,233
Yichuan	Luoyang	756,616
Yanshi	Luoyang	666,650
Xinhua	Pingdingshan	389842
Weidong	Pingdingshan	302,582
Shilong	Pingdingshan	54,909
Zhanhe	Pingdingshan	286,642
Baofeng	Pingdingshan	490,236
Ye(xian)	Pingdingshan	777,150
Lushan	Pingdingshan	789,845
Jia(xian)	Pingdingshan	571,484
Wugang	Pingdingshan	313,807
Ruzhou	Pingdingshan	927,870
Wenfeng	Anyang	442,854
Beiguan	Anyang	245,608
Yindu	Anyang	243,858
Long'an	Anyang	214,441
Anyang	Anyang	848,999
Tangyin	Anyang	430,773
Hua(xian)	Anyang	1,263,203
Neihuang	Anyang	693,451
Linzhou	Anyang	789,647
Heshan	Hebi	131,413
Shancheng	Hebi	230,952
Qibin	Hebi	272,313
Xun(xian)	Hebi	665,292
Qi(xian)	Hebi	269,130
Hongqi	Xinxiang	391,265
Weibin	Xinxiang	193,493
Fengquan	Xinxiang	144,289
Muye	Xinxiang	317,973
Xinxiang	Xinxiang	339918
Huojia	Xinxiang	402,922
Yuanyang	Xinxiang	659,335
Yanjin	Xinxiang	469,248
Fengqiu	Xinxiang	743,786
Changyuan	Xinxiang	809,479
Weihui	Xinxiang	495,710
Huixian	Xinxiang	740,383
Jiefang	Jiaozuo	295,675
Zhongzhan	Jiaozuo	106,057
Macun	Jiaozuo	139,524
Shanyang	Jiaozuo	324,100
Xiuwu	Jiaozuo	287,794
Bo'ai	Jiaozuo	436,289
Wuzhi	Jiaozuo	713,896
Wen(xian)	Jiaozuo	421,767
Qinyang	Jiaozuo	447,670
Mengzhou	Jiaozuo	367,088
Hualong	Puyang	655,630
Qingfeng	Puyang	635,880
Nanle	Puyang	458,450
Fan(xian)	Puyang	469,840
Taiqian	Puyang	332,100
Puyang	Puyang	104,650
Weidu	Xuchang	498,058
Jian'an	Xuchang	767,396
Yanling	Xuchang	551,575
Xiangcheng	Xuchang	671,270
Yuzhou	Xuchang	1,131,819
Changge	Xuchang	687,081
Yuanhui	Luohe	323,935
Yancheng	Luohe	493,648
Shaoling	Luohe	477,308
Wuyang	Luohe	538,412
Linying	Luohe	710,800
Hubin	Sanmenxia	325,608
Mianchi	Sanmenxia	346,411
Shan(xian)	Sanmenxia	343,657
Lushi	Sanmenxia	352,425
Yima	Sanmenxia	721,001
Wancheng	Nanyang	887,215
Wolong	Nanyang	924,517
Nanzhao	Nanyang	557,117
Fangcheng	Nanyang	922,404
Xixia	Nanyang	444,383
Zhenping	Nanyang	859,506
Neixiang	Nanyang	575,169
Xichuan	Nanyang	685,637
Sheqi	Nanyang	633,742
Tanghe	Nanyang	1,282,174
Xinye	Nanyang	629,166
Tongbai	Nanyang	393,915
Dengzhou	Nanyang	1,468,061
Liangyuan	Shangqiu	787,931
Suiyang	Shangqiu	748,356
Minquan	Shangqiu	703,379
Sui(xian)	Shangqiu	711,088
Ningling	Shangqiu	523,367
Zhecheng	Shangqiu	778,107
Yucheng	Shangqiu	954,720
Xiayi	Shangqiu	915,228
Yongcheng	Shangqiu	1,240,296
Shihe	Xinyang	594,351
Pingqiao	Xinyang	635,608
Luoshan	Xinyang	504,542
Guangshan	Xinyang	585,314
Xi(xian)	Xinyang	275,285
Shangcheng	Xinyang	495,491
Gushi	Xinyang	1,023,857
Huangchuan	Xinyang	630,333
Huaibin	Xinyang	570,156
Xin(xian)	Xinyang	793,746
Chuanhui	Zhoukou	505,139
Huaiyang	Zhoukou	1,089,621
Fugou	Zhoukou	625,776
Xihua	Zhoukou	787,862
Shangshui	Zhoukou	940,727
Shenqiu	Zhoukou	983,516
Dancheng	Zhoukou	1,003,841
Taikang	Zhoukou	1,102,875
Luyi	Zhoukou	910,189
Xiangcheng	Zhoukou	1,003,626
Yicheng	Zhumadian	721,678
Xiping	Zhumadian	700,103
Shangcai	Zhumadian	1,084,133
Pingyu	Zhumadian	748,348
Zhengyang	Zhumadian	644,991
Queshan	Zhumadian	405,992
Biyang	Zhumadian	810,353
Runan	Zhumadian	769,945
Suiping	Zhumadian	493,897
Xincai	Zhumadian	851,304
Jiyuan	Directly administered	675,710
