= Beiguan, Anyang =

Coordinates: 36.1033°N 114.376°E

Beiguan 北关区
- District
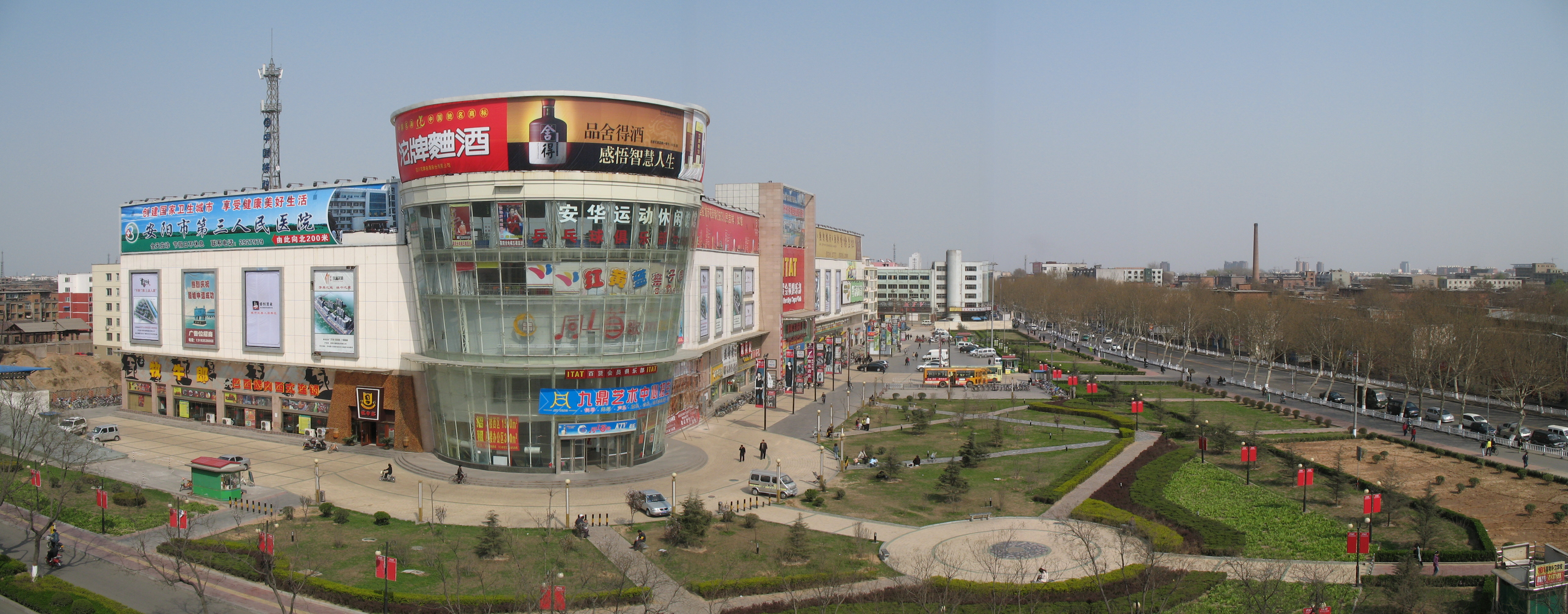
- Interactive map of Beiguan
- Country: People's Republic of China
- Province: Henan
- Prefecture-level city: Anyang

Area
  - Total: 59 km^{2} (23 sq mi)

Population (2019)
  - Total: 326,100
  - Density: 5,500/km^{2} (14,000/sq mi)
- Time zone: UTC+8 (China Standard)
- Postal code: 455000

Beiguan District (simplified Chinese: 北关区; traditional Chinese: 北關區; pinyin: Běiguān Qū) is a district of the city of Anyang, Henan province, China.

== Administrative divisions ==
As of 2012, this district is divided to 9 subdistricts.

Subdistricts

- Dengtalu Subdistrict (灯塔路街道)
- Doufuying Subdistrict (豆腐营街道)
- Hongqilu Subdistrict (红旗路街道)
- Huanbei Subdistrict (洹北街道)
- Jiefanglu Subdistrict (解放路街道)
- Minhanglu Subdistrict (民航路街道)
- Shuguanglu Subdistrict (曙光路街道)
- Zhangdong Subdistrict (彰东街道)
- Zhangbei Subdistrict (彰北街道)
