= Long'an, Anyang =

Coordinates: 36°5′N 114°18′E

Long'an 龙安区
- District
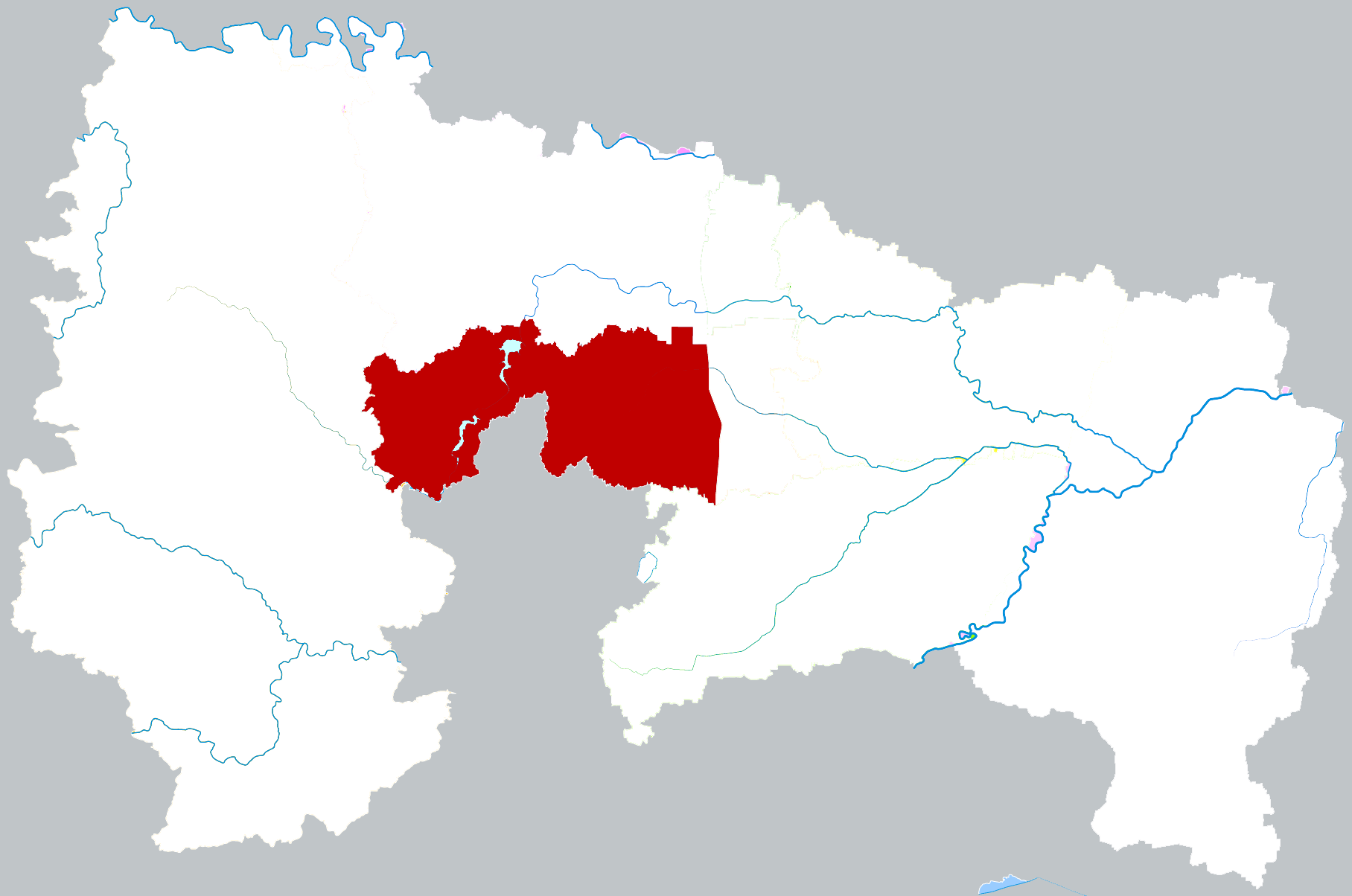
- Location of Long'an
- Interactive map of Long'an
- Country: People's Republic of China
- Province: Henan
- Prefecture-level city: Anyang

Area
  - Total: 236 km^{2} (91 sq mi)

Population (2019)
  - Total: 287,200
  - Density: 1,220/km^{2} (3,150/sq mi)
- Time zone: UTC+8 (China Standard)
- Postal code: 455000

Long'an District (simplified Chinese: 龙安区; traditional Chinese: 龍安區; pinyin: Lóng'ān Qū) is a district of the city of Anyang, Henan province, China.

== Administrative divisions ==
As of 2012, this district is divided to 6 subdistricts, 1 town, and 2 townships.

Subdistricts

- Taihangxiaoqu Subdistrict (太行小区街道)
- Tiancun Subdistrict (田村街道)
- Wenchangdadao Subdistrict (文昌大道街道)
- Wenmingdadao Subdistrict (文明大道街道)
- Zhangwu Subdistrict (彰武街道)
- Zhongzhoulu Subdistrict (中州路街道)

Towns

- Longquan (龙泉镇)

Townships

- Dongfeng Township (东风乡)
- Matoujian Township (马投涧乡)
