= Shaoling, Luohe =

Coordinates: 33°35′28″N 114°09′48″E

Shaoling 召陵区
- District
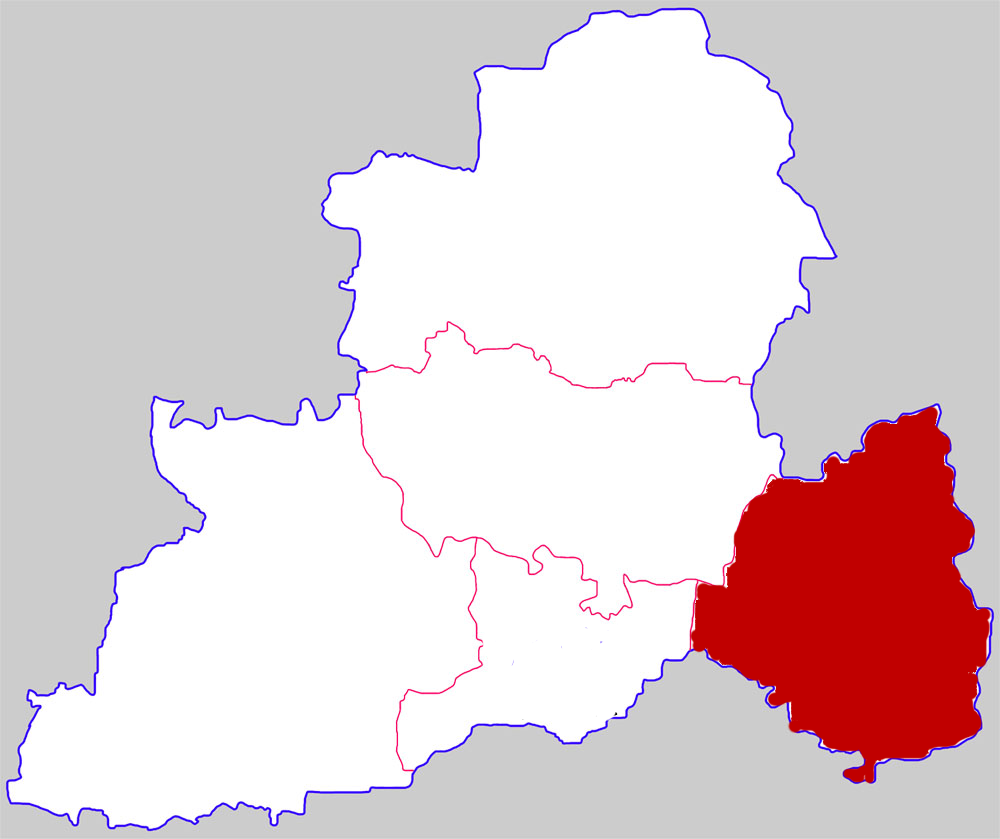
- Shaoling in Luohe

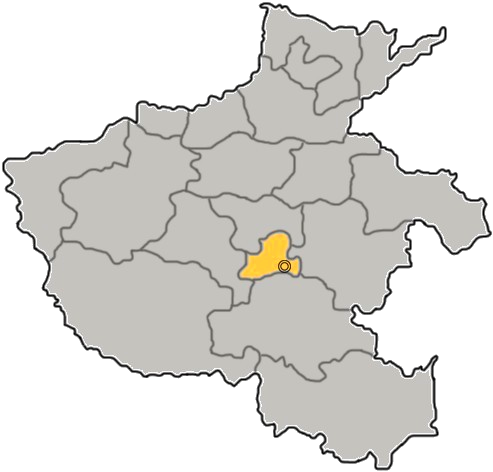
- Luohe in Henan
- Country: People's Republic of China
- Province: Henan
- Prefecture-level city: Luohe

Area
  - Total: 405 km^{2} (156 sq mi)

Population (2019)
  - Total: 503,800
  - Density: 1,240/km^{2} (3,220/sq mi)
- Time zone: UTC+8 (China Standard)
- Postal code: 462300
- Website: http://www.lhsl.gov.cn/

Shaoling District (Chinese: 召陵区; pinyin: Shàolíng Qū) is a district of the city of Luohe, Henan province, China.

== Administrative divisions ==
As of 2012, this district is divided to 2 subdistricts, 5 towns and 2 townships.

Subdistricts

- Zhaizhuang Subdistrict (翟庄街道)
- Tianqiaojie Subdistrict (天桥街街道)

Towns

- Dengxiang (邓襄镇)
- Jishi (姬石镇)
- Laowo (老窝镇)
- Shaoling (召陵镇)
- Wanjin (万金镇)

Townships

- Houxie Township (后谢乡)
- Qingniancun Township (青年村乡)
