= Anyang =

Anyang 安阳市
- Prefecture-level city
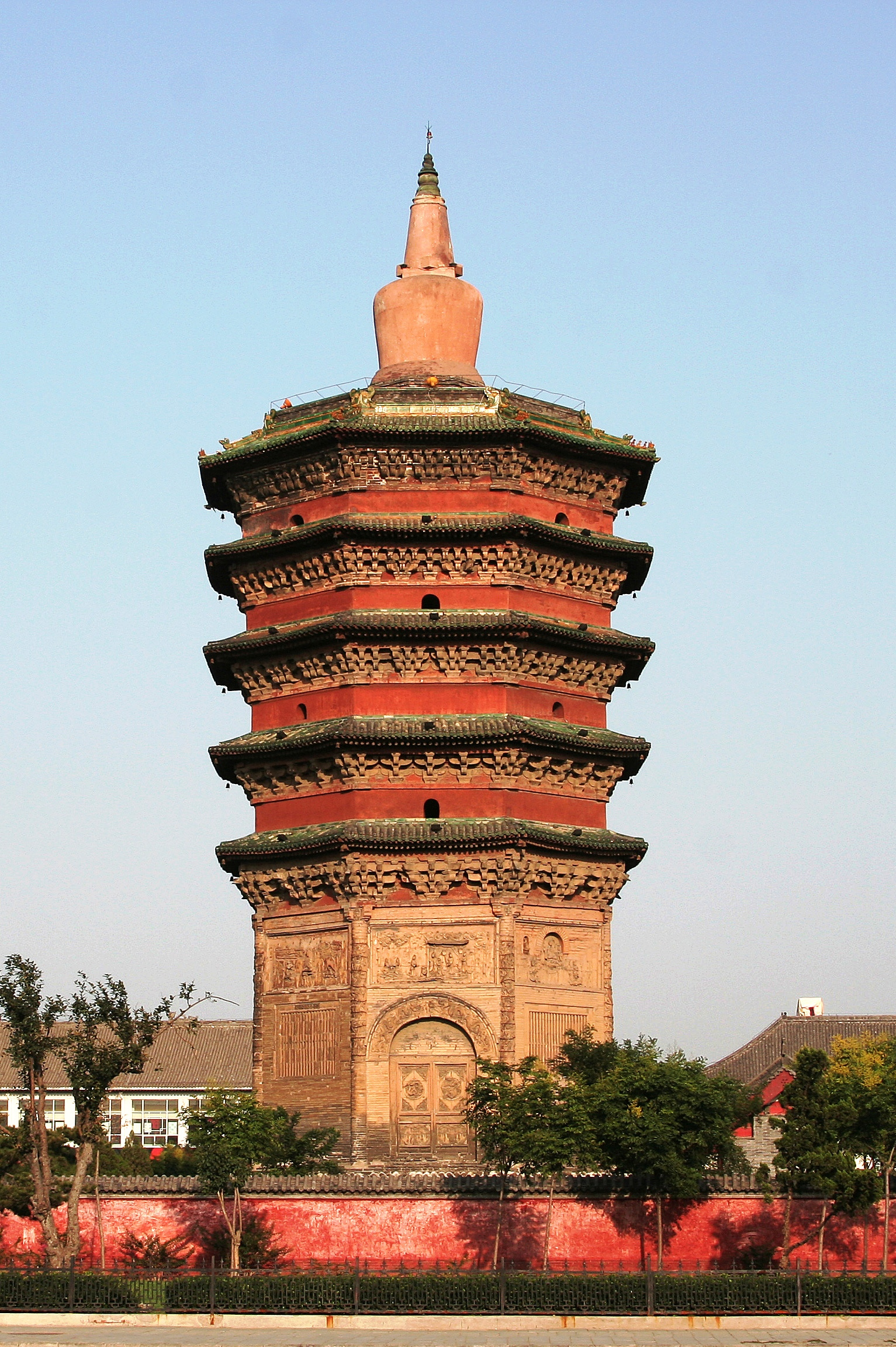
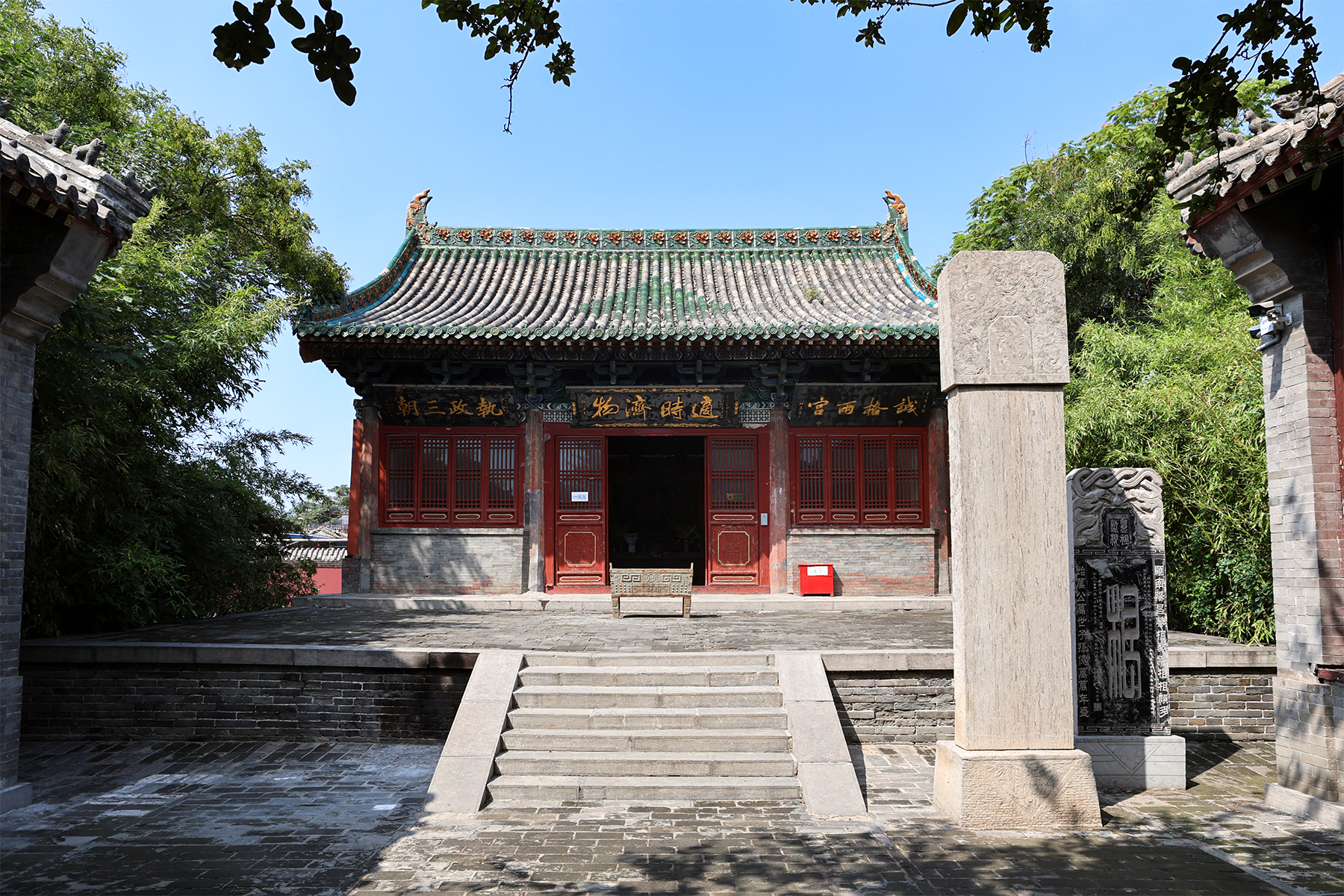
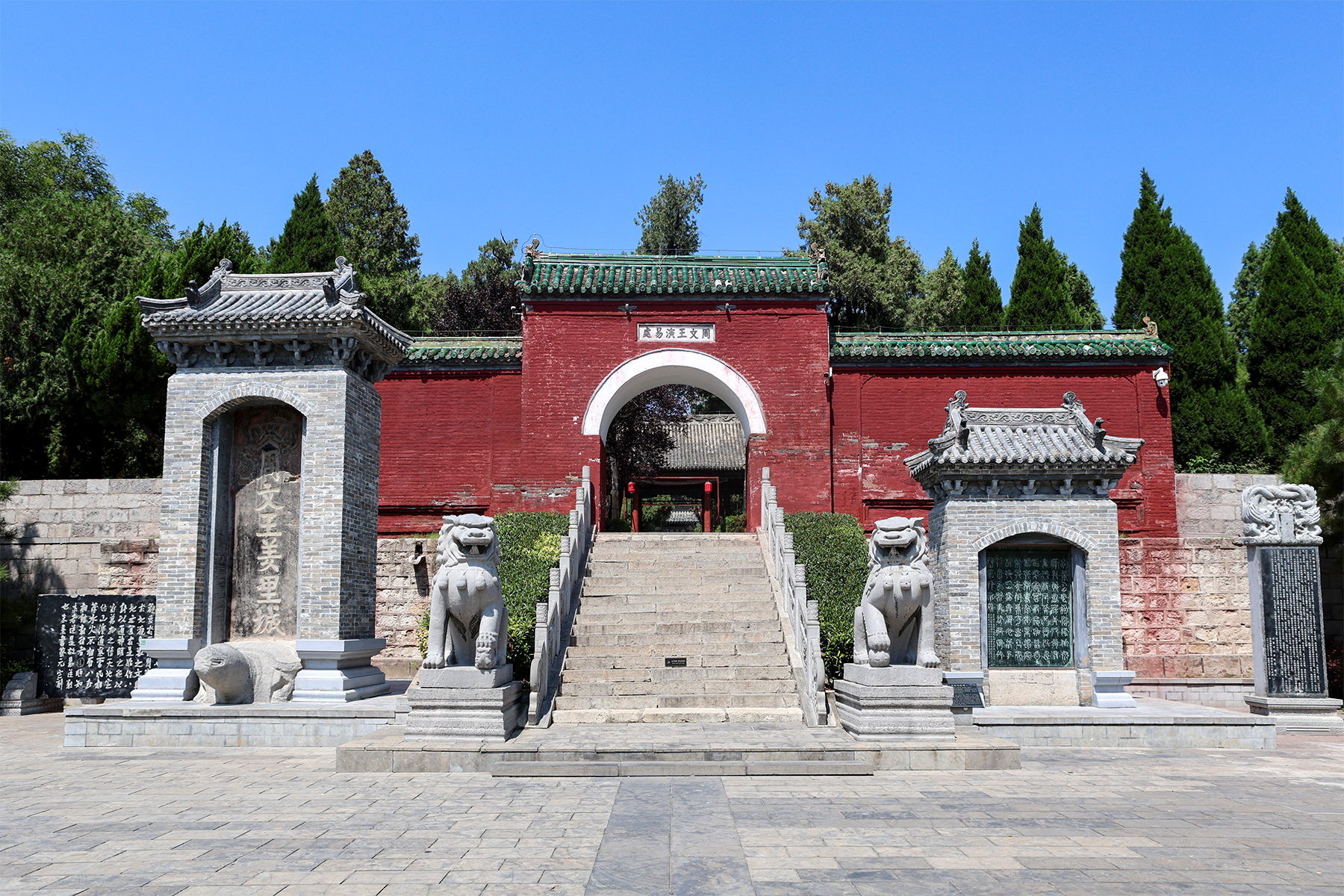
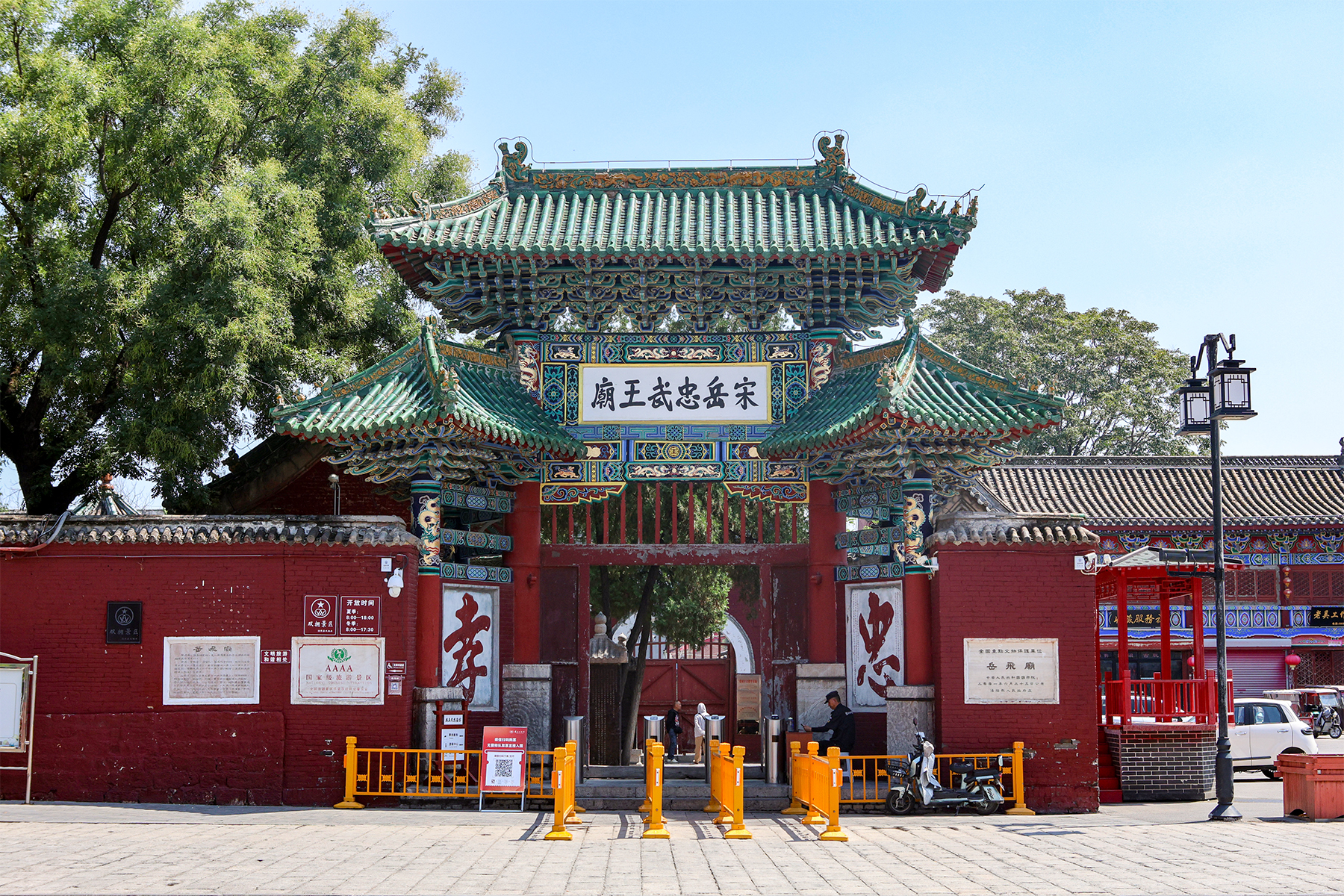
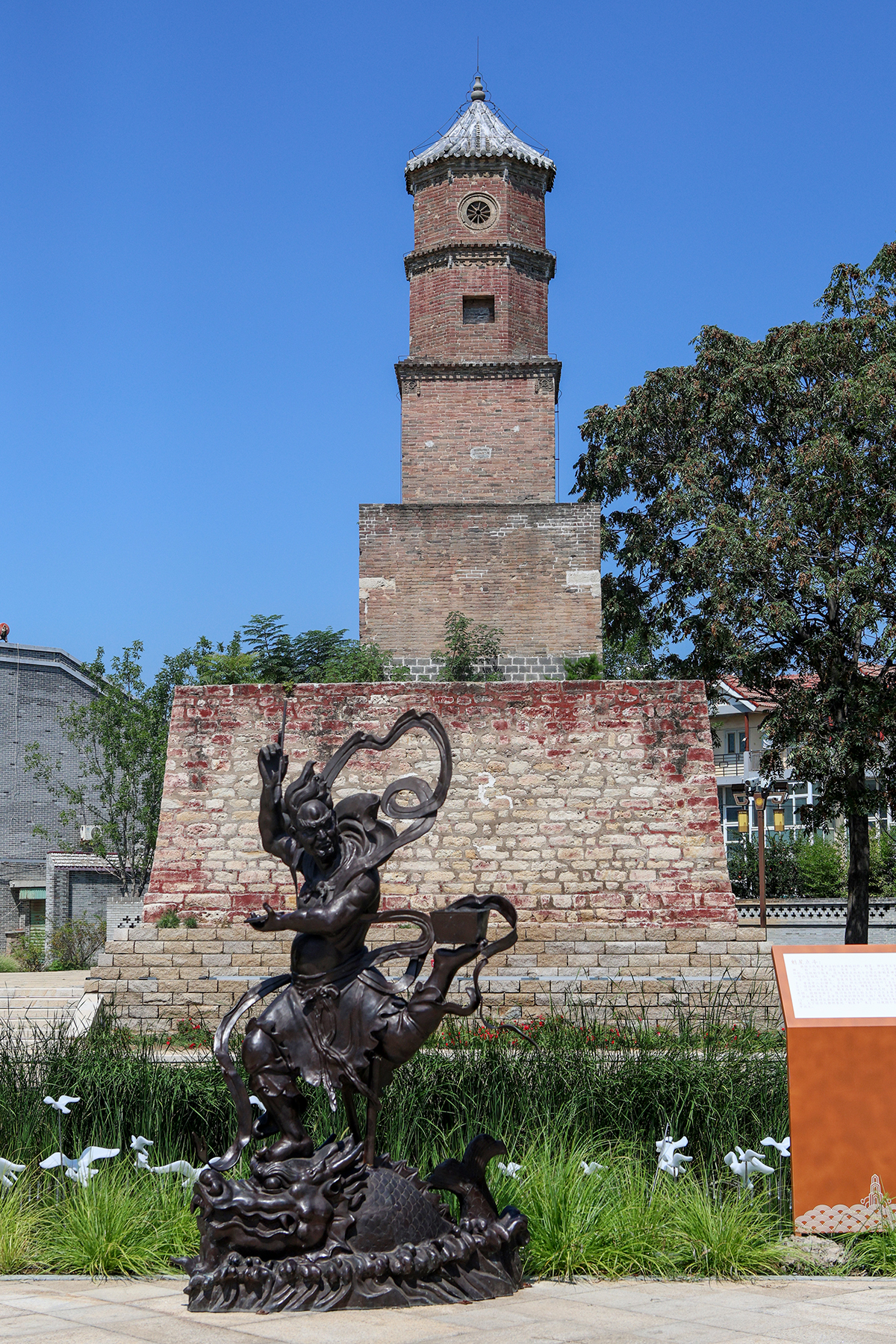
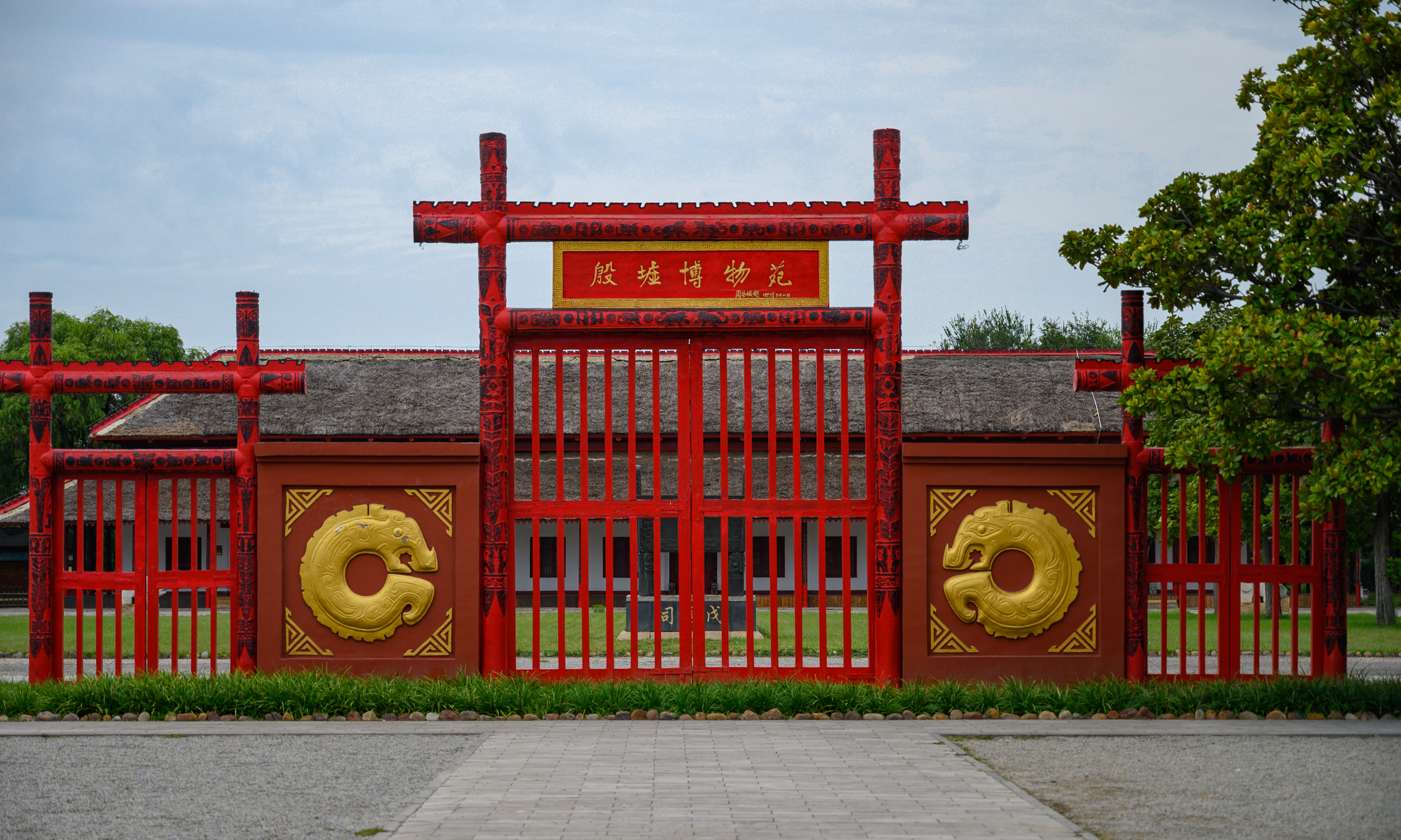
- Wenfeng Pagoda and the Tianning Temple Temple of Han Qi Site of Youlicheng Yue Fei Temple in Tangyin Kuiguang Mansion Yinxu

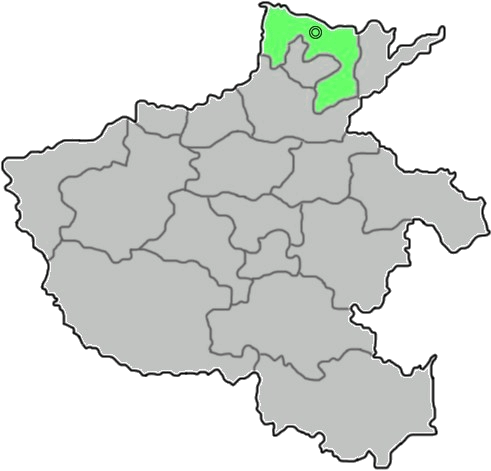
- Location of Anyang City jurisdiction in Henan

- Location in the North China Plain Anyang (China)
- Coordinates (Anyang municipal government): 36°05′56″N 114°23′31″E
- Country: People's Republic of China
- Province: Henan
- Municipal seat: Wenfeng District

Area
  - Prefecture-level city: 7,355 km^{2} (2,840 sq mi)
  - Urban: 543.5 km^{2} (209.8 sq mi)
  - Metro: 2,392 km^{2} (924 sq mi)
- Elevation: 69 m (226 ft)

Population (2020 census)
  - Prefecture-level city: 5,477,614
  - Density: 744.7/km^{2} (1,929/sq mi)
  - Urban: 1,398,887
  - Urban density: 2,574/km^{2} (6,666/sq mi)
  - Metro: 2,675,523
  - Metro density: 1,119/km^{2} (2,897/sq mi)

GDP
  - Prefecture-level city: CN¥ 203.0 billion US$ 30.6 billion
  - Per capita: CN¥ 39,603; US$ 5,962
- Time zone: UTC+8 (China Standard)
- Postal Code: 455000, 456100, 456300, 456400, 456500
- Area code: 0372
- ISO 3166 code: CN-HA-05
- Major Nationalities: Han
- County-level divisions: 9
- License plate prefixes: 豫E
- Website: www.anyang.gov.cn

Anyang (simplified Chinese: 安阳; traditional Chinese: 安陽; pinyin: Ānyáng; [án.jǎŋ]) is a prefecture-level city in Henan, China. The northernmost city in Henan, it borders Puyang to the east, Hebi and Xinxiang to the south, and the provinces of Shanxi and Hebei to its west and north respectively. Anyang had a total population of 5,477,614 as of the 2020 census, 2,675,523 of whom lived in the built-up (or metro) area made of four urban districts and Anyang and Tangyin counties, now largely agglomerated with the city proper.

Anyang is the location of the ancient city of Yin, which was the capital of the Shang dynasty and the first stable capital of China. As the ancient capital of the Seven Dynasties and one of the birthplaces of Chinese civilization, Anyang is rich in historical and cultural resources and has a number of world-class and national historical sites. At the end of 1986, it was recognized as a national historical and cultural city.

== History ==
=== Early history ===
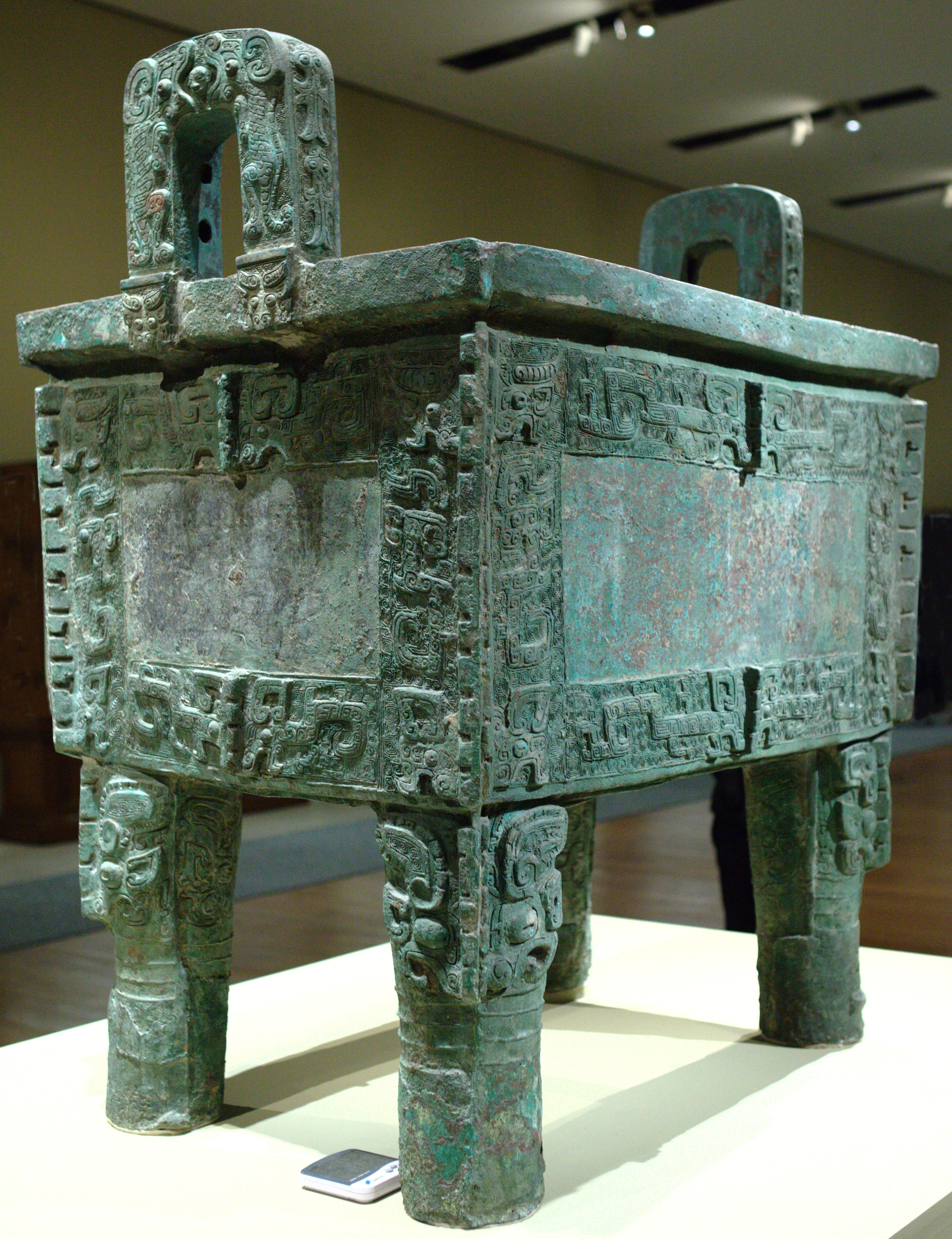
Ancient Shang era Houmuwu ding bronze artifact unearthed at Anyang.

Xiaonanhai, on the far western edge of the city, was home to prehistoric cavemen during the Stone Age. Over 7,000 artifacts (including stone tools and animal bone fossils) have been unearthed here, representing what has been dubbed the Xiaonanhai culture.

Around 2000 BC, the legendary sage-kings Zhuanxu and Emperor Ku are said to have established their capitals in the area around modern Anyang from where they ruled their kingdoms. Today their mausoleums are situated in Sanyang village south of Neihuang County.

At the beginning of the 14th century BC, King Pangeng of the Shang dynasty established his capital 2 km (1.2 mi) north of the modern city on the banks of the Huan River. The city, known as Yin, was the first stable capital in Chinese history and from that point on the dynasty that founded it would also become known as the Yin dynasty.

The capital served 12 kings in 8 generations including Wu Ding, under whom the dynasty reached the zenith of its power, until it was wiped out along with the dynasty that was founded by King Wu of the Zhou in 1046 BC.

Anyang was made the county seat of Anyang County c. 607 CE and it has held that position ever since.

Anyang's Tangyin County was the ancient seat of Yue Village, the birthplace of the famous Song dynasty general, Yue Fei. This was also the historic home of Zhou Tong, Yue's military arts tutor (though fictional sources place him in Shaanxi).

=== Modern era ===
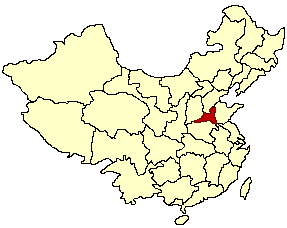
The former Pingyuan Province (1949–52) of which Anyang was a part

The town was known as Zhangde (彰德) until 1912, when it was given its present name of Anyang, following the establishment of the Republic of China.

In August 1949, Anyang prefecture was detached from Henan and – along with Puyang and Xinxiang – consigned to the short lived experimental province of Pingyuan by the ruling Communist government. All three were eventually returned to Henan's territory in November 1953, with the dissolution of Pingyuan.

== Geography and climate ==
Anyang spans a total area of 7,355 square kilometres (2,840 sq mi). The city's elevation is generally higher in the west, with the foothills of the Taihang Mountains running through the area, and lower in the east, which comprises part of the North China Plain.

Anyang has a four-season, monsoon-influenced humid continental climate/semi-arid climate (Köppen Dwa/BSk). Winters are cold and very dry, with a January 24-hour average of −0.8 °C (30.6 °F). Summers are hot and humid, with July averaging 27.2 °C (81.0 °F). A majority of the annual precipitation of 552 mm (21.7 in) falls in July and August alone, and the annual mean temperature is 14.28 °C (57.7 °F). With monthly percent possible sunshine ranging from 43% in July to 58% in May, the city receives 2,225 hours of bright sunshine annually, with April to June the sunniest period. Extreme temperatures have ranged from −23.6 °C (−10 °F) to 43.2 °C (110 °F). There are more northerly winds in winter, while southerly winds dominate in summer.

Climate data for Anyang, elevation 63 m (207 ft), (1991–2020 normals, extremes 1951–present)
Month	Jan	Feb	Mar	Apr	May	Jun	Jul	Aug	Sep	Oct	Nov	Dec	Year
Record high °C (°F)	21.7 (71.1)	27.2 (81.0)	32.2 (90.0)	37.0 (98.6)	42.0 (107.6)	43.2 (109.8)	41.8 (107.2)	39.5 (103.1)	39.3 (102.7)	34.6 (94.3)	27.7 (81.9)	26.3 (79.3)	43.2 (109.8)
Mean daily maximum °C (°F)	4.2 (39.6)	8.8 (47.8)	14.4 (57.9)	21.4 (70.5)	26.9 (80.4)	32.3 (90.1)	32.0 (89.6)	30.4 (86.7)	26.9 (80.4)	21.5 (70.7)	12.9 (55.2)	6.0 (42.8)	19.8 (67.6)
Daily mean °C (°F)	−1.2 (29.8)	3.0 (37.4)	8.5 (47.3)	15.4 (59.7)	21.1 (70.0)	26.2 (79.2)	27.3 (81.1)	25.7 (78.3)	21.2 (70.2)	15.2 (59.4)	7.0 (44.6)	0.7 (33.3)	14.2 (57.5)
Mean daily minimum °C (°F)	−5.3 (22.5)	−1.7 (28.9)	3.3 (37.9)	9.7 (49.5)	15.4 (59.7)	20.4 (68.7)	23.1 (73.6)	21.9 (71.4)	16.6 (61.9)	10.2 (50.4)	2.4 (36.3)	−3.3 (26.1)	9.4 (48.9)
Record low °C (°F)	−23.6 (−10.5)	−16.7 (1.9)	−10.1 (13.8)	−2.7 (27.1)	5.5 (41.9)	10.2 (50.4)	15.8 (60.4)	11.6 (52.9)	5.5 (41.9)	−1.4 (29.5)	−11.4 (11.5)	−18.1 (−0.6)	−23.6 (−10.5)
Average precipitation mm (inches)	5.2 (0.20)	8.8 (0.35)	15.4 (0.61)	26.0 (1.02)	40.2 (1.58)	59.9 (2.36)	162.2 (6.39)	118.5 (4.67)	59.9 (2.36)	27.2 (1.07)	18.9 (0.74)	5.6 (0.22)	547.8 (21.57)
Average precipitation days (≥ 0.1 mm)	3.0	3.3	3.7	4.9	6.7	7.7	11.2	8.9	7.6	5.3	4.1	2.7	69.1
Average snowy days	3.4	3.2	1.5	0.3	0	0	0	0	0	0	1.5	2.9	12.8
Average relative humidity (%)	61	58	57	60	64	61	77	80	74	67	67	65	66
Mean monthly sunshine hours	111.0	130.4	174.9	207.7	227.8	204.7	168.9	174.8	157.8	156.0	133.9	113.1	1,961
Percentage possible sunshine	36	42	47	53	52	47	38	42	43	45	44	38	44
Source: China Meteorological Administration extremes all-time January high

== Administration ==
The prefecture-level city of Anyang administers 9 county-level administrative divisions, including 4 districts, 1 county-level city, and 4 counties. These, in turn, administer 46 subdistricts, 66 towns, and 23 townships, which then administer 302 residential communities and 2,979 administrative villages.

Map
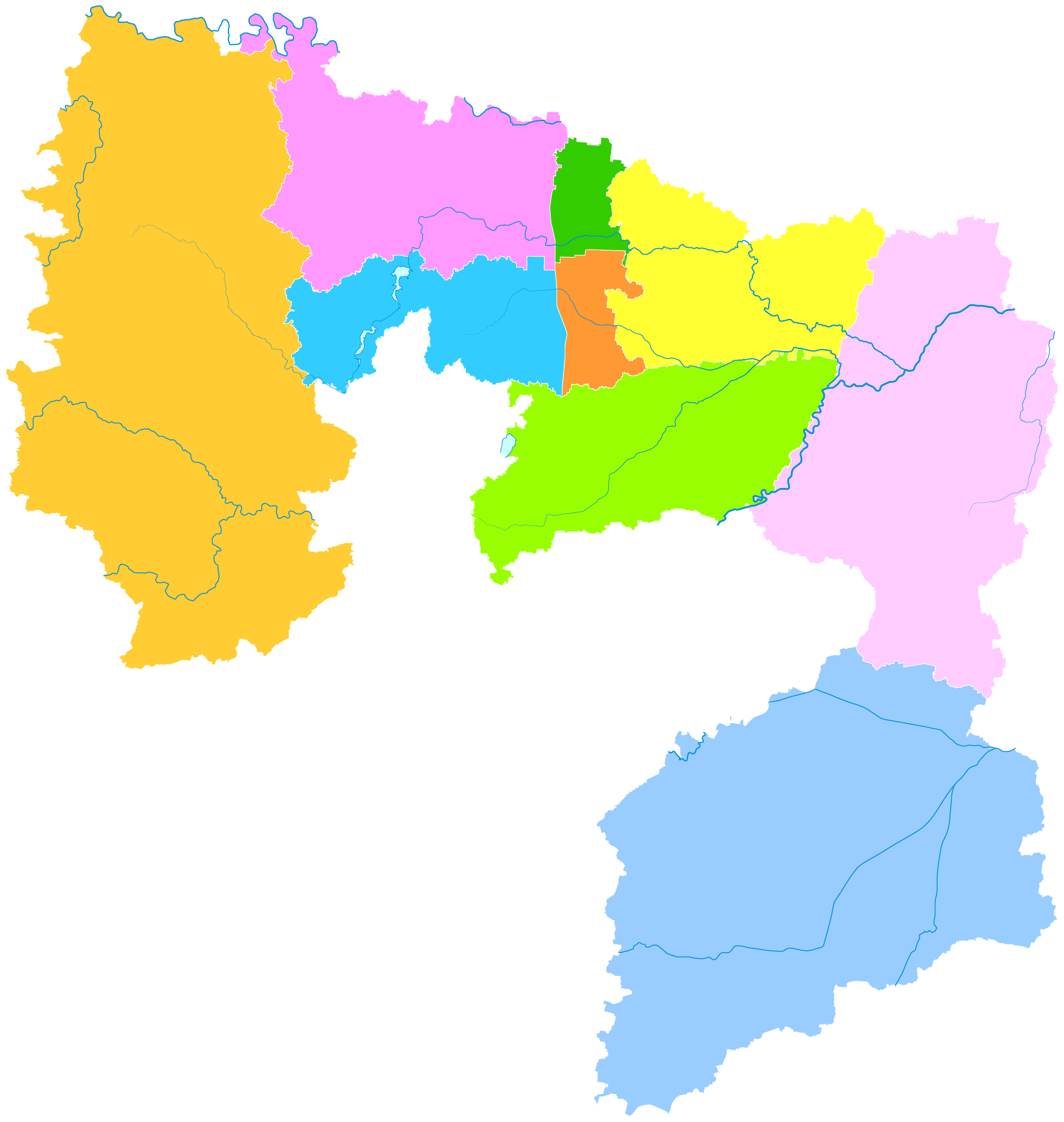

Name	Hanzi	Hanyu Pinyin
Wenfeng District	文峰区	Wénfēng Qū
Beiguan District	北关区	Běiguān Qū
Yindu District	殷都区	Yīndū Qū
Long'an District	龙安区	Lóng'ān Qū
Linzhou City	林州市	Línzhōu Shì
Anyang County	安阳县	Ānyáng Xiàn
Tangyin County	汤阴县	Tāngyīn Xiàn
Hua County	滑县	Huá Xiàn
Neihuang County	内黄县	Nèihuáng Xiàn

== Demographics ==
Per the 2020 Chinese Census, Anyang has a population of 5.48 million people. The overwhelming majority of the city's population is ethnically Han Chinese, with ethnic minorities constituting a population of around 10,000 people. 43 different ethnic minorities live in the city, with prominent ethnic minority communities including the Hui, Mongols, Manchus, Zhuang, Miao, Tibetans, and the Yi.

== Economy ==
Anyang is a largely industrial city, with major industries including the production of metals such as iron and steel, coal coking, and clothing production. Major Chinese steel producer Shagang Group has operations in Anyang. Major mineral reserves in Anyang include dolomite, potassium-bearing shale, nepheline syenite, quartzite, limestone, and clay.

The city's total gross domestic product (GDP) totaled 243.55 billion renminbi (RMB) as of 2021, a 5% increase from the prior year. Anyang's primary sector comprised 9.7% of the city's GDP, the secondary sector comprised 43.7%, and the tertiary sector comprised 46.6%.

The per capita disposable income in Anyang totaled 27,365 RMB as of 2021, an increase of 7.2% from 2020. The per capita disposable income of Anyang's urban residents was 37,464 RMB, a 6% annual increase, and the per capita disposable income of rural residents was 18,424 RMB, an 8.4% annual increase.

Sixteen foreign-funded enterprises (joint ventures, cooperative enterprises, and wholly foreign-owned enterprises) have been established in Anyang. Recently, Anyang has established an economic and technological development zone covering a total area of 22.8 km^{2} (8.8 sq mi), and issued a series of preferential policies to attract many domestic Chinese and foreign businesses.

The Anyang Hongqiqu Airport opened on November 29, 2023. Anyang Hongqiqu Airport is located in the junction area of Anyang, Puyang and Hebi cities, covering an area of approximately 2,339 acres. The total project investment is 1.366 billion yuan. It is positioned as a domestic civil regional airport with a flight area level of 4C. The opening of the airport will directly serve the air travel of 11.6 million people in the three cities in northern Henan, and radiate about 60 million people within 150 kilometers of eastern Shanxi, southern Hebei and southwestern Shandong.

== Tourism ==
Anyang city is an ancient city with a history of over 3,000 years and is one of the Eight Ancient Capitals of China, and also one of the best preserved. It is one of the key birthplaces of Chinese ancient culture. At the same time, it is a national historical and cultural city, the hometown of Oracle, the birthplace of the Book of Changes, the birthplace of the spirit of the Red Flag Canal, and the location of the world cultural heritage Yin Ruins, Cao Cao's Gaoling, and the Museum of Chinese Characters. Here are the primitive caves of 25,000 years ago, the overlapping strata of the Yangshao Culture, Longshan Culture and Xiaotun Culture, the memorial mausoleums of ancient Emperor Zhuanxu and Emperor Ku over 4,000 years ago, the first library of inscriptions on bones and tortoise shells, the Soul Spring Temple, known as the "First Ancient Buddhist Temple in Henan", and 10,000-Buddha Ravine, as well as unique Wenfeng Pagoda, Xiuding Temple Pagoda and Mingfu Temple Pagoda. The city has three large museums: the Anyang Museum, the National Museum of Chinese Writing, and the Yinxu Museum on the ruins and royal tombs of the Shang dynasty. Anyang also has beautiful natural scenery—the Taihang Linlu Hill Scenic Area on the 400-km Taihang Mountains and the grand 1,500-km Red Flag Canal.

=== Changchun Temple ===
Changchun Temple, a Taoist shrine, was built on the hillside of the mountains surrounding it during the Tang dynasty. It was officially opened to the public on 1 May 2014, after a period of cautious restoration.

=== Tianning Temple ===
Tianning Si (Mansion Temple) was established during the Tang dynasty, and has recently been restored by the Protection and Research Institute of Ancient Architecture of Anyang City, and opened to the public. The main structures within the temple compound include: the gate house, the three-room (8.4 m x 14 m) Hall of the Heavenly King with hanging-eaves over the gables rebuilt in 2002, the slightly larger Precious Hall of the Great Hero (17.8 m x 11.65 m) with single-eave gabled roof originally from the Qing dynasty and rebuilt in 2001, and the Wenfeng Pagoda.

=== Wenfeng Pagoda ===
Wenfeng Ta (Literature Peak Pagoda) on the grounds of the Tianning Temple is believed to have been constructed in 925 and is known, from inscriptions concerning the reconstruction of the temple, to have been in place by 952. The current pagoda was constructed during the Ming dynasty and received its current name during the Qing dynasty due to its proximity to the Confucian temple. The five-story dark red brick octagonal tower is 38.65m high and is, unusually, larger at the top than the bottom and is topped with a 10-metre Lamaist stupa-style dagoba steeple. The pagoda stands on a two-metre-high stone pedestal and is decorated with multi-eave pent roofs and carvings of Buddhas and bodhisattvas. The unique pagoda is the symbol of Anyang.

=== Yinxu ruins and museum ===
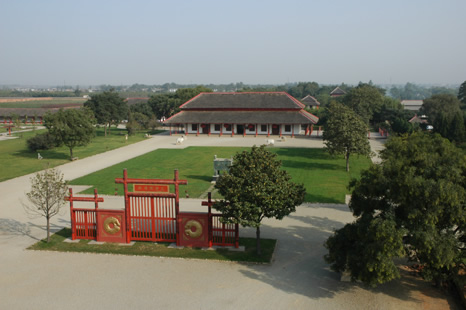
Yinxu Ruin area

Located about 2 km (1.2 mi) northwest of Anyang are the ruins of the Shang dynasty capital known as Yin. This massive archaeological site was discovered in 1899, excavated in the decades that followed, and first opened to the public in the 1980s as the Garden Museum of Yinxu. The current Yinxu museum was opened on 16 March 2005, and includes the famous Tomb of Fu Hao.

The site was later designated a UNESCO World Heritage Sites in 2006.

== See also ==
- List of twin towns and sister cities in China
- Historical capitals of China
- History of the political divisions of China
