= Tangyin County =

Tangyin County 汤阴县
- County
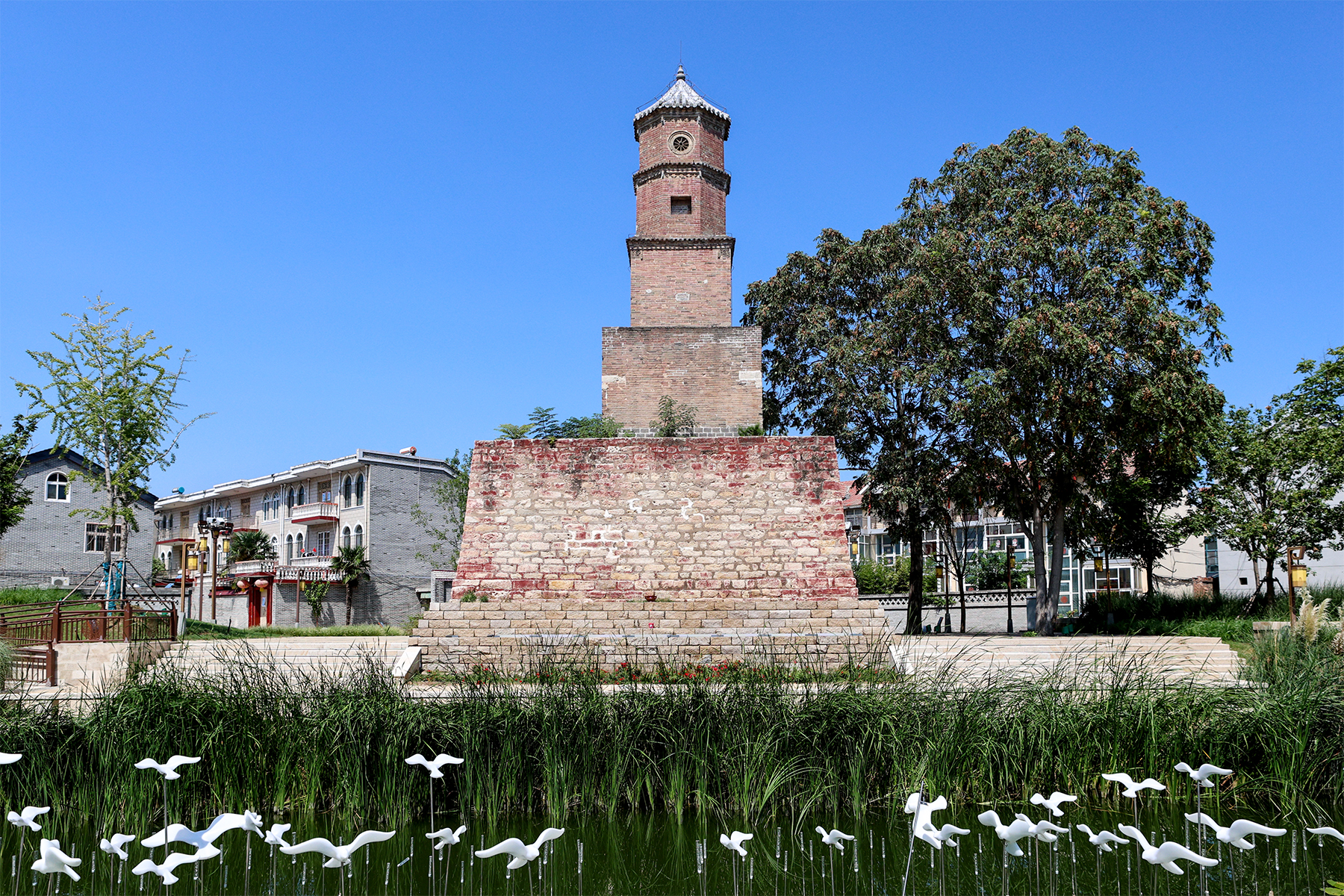
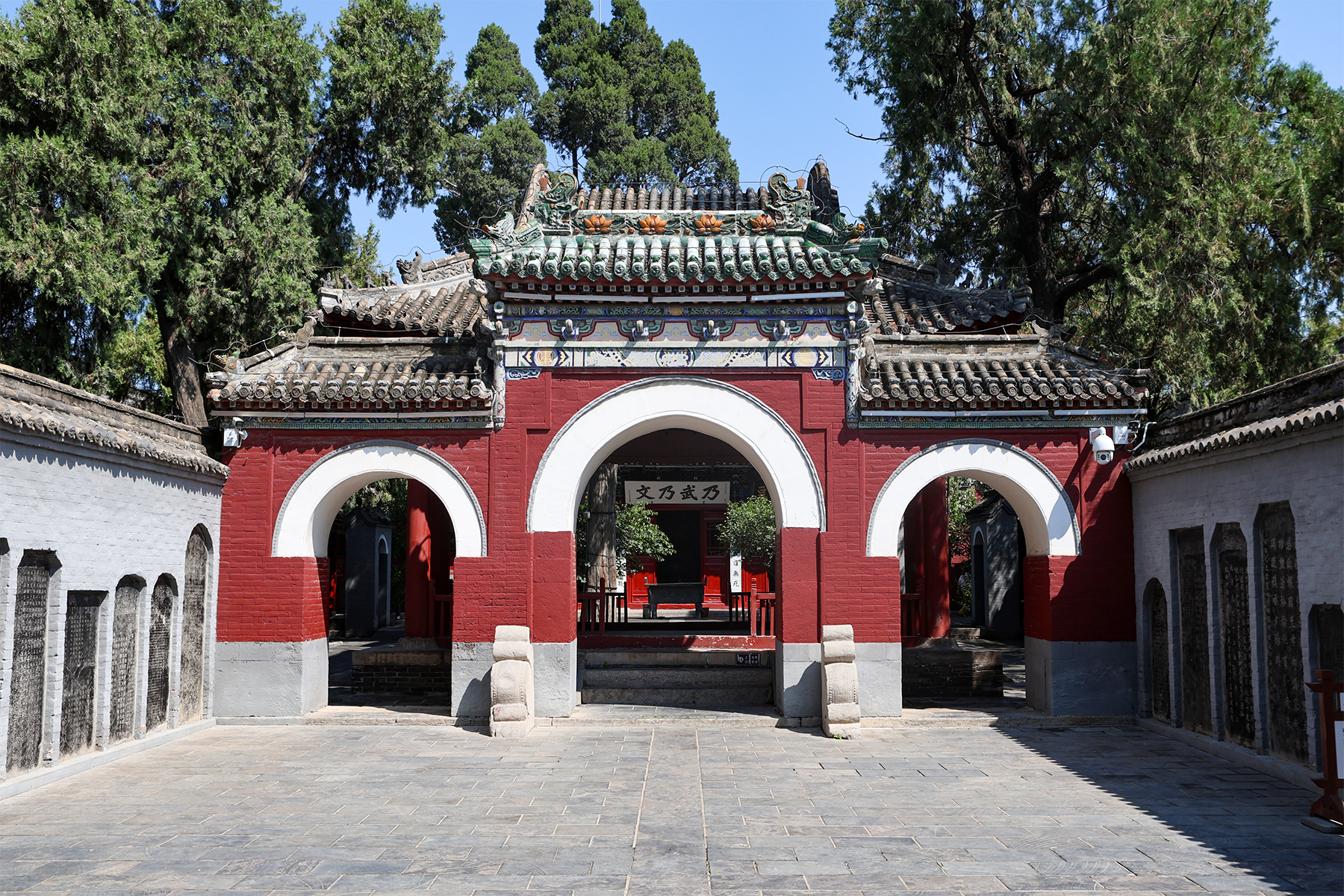
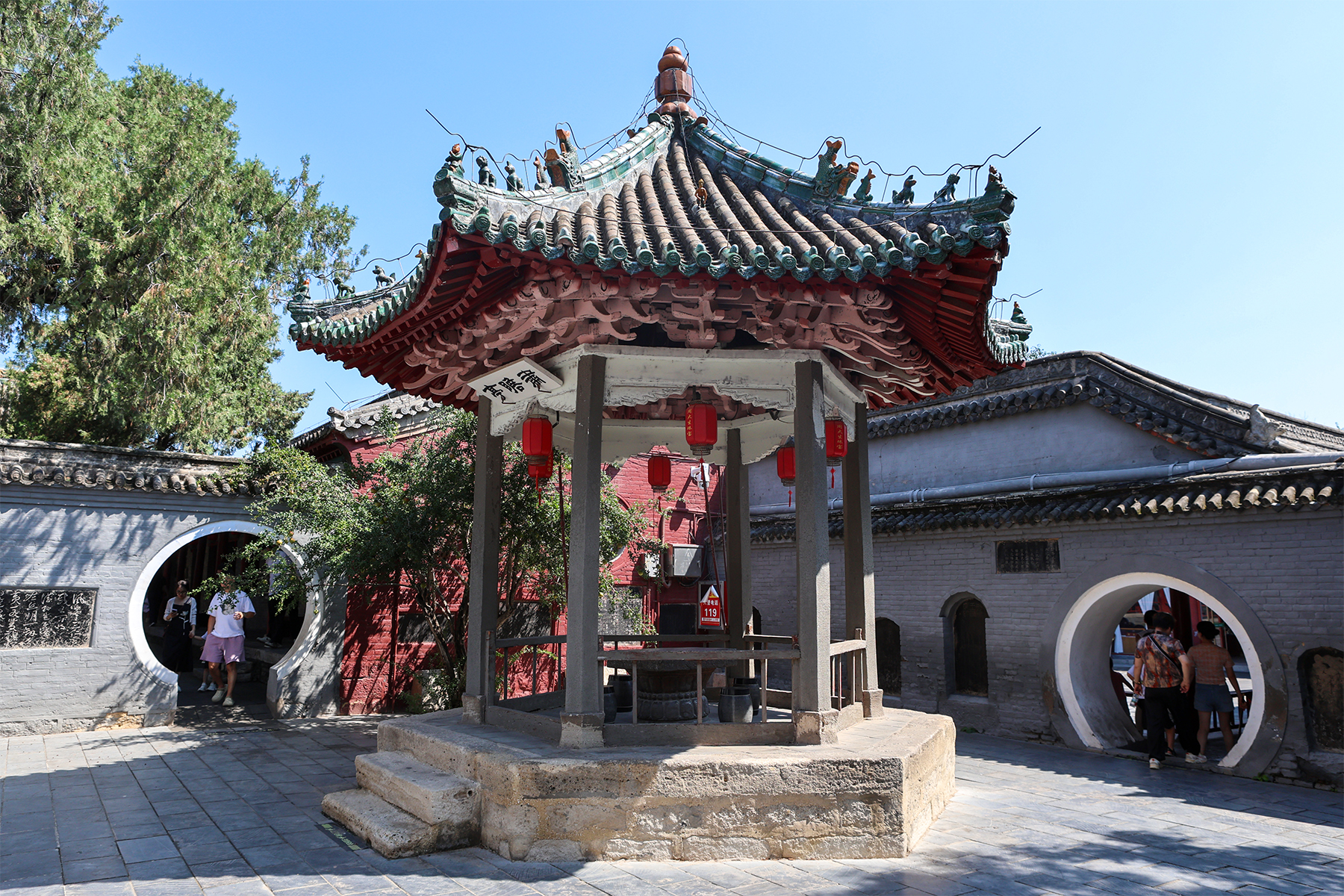
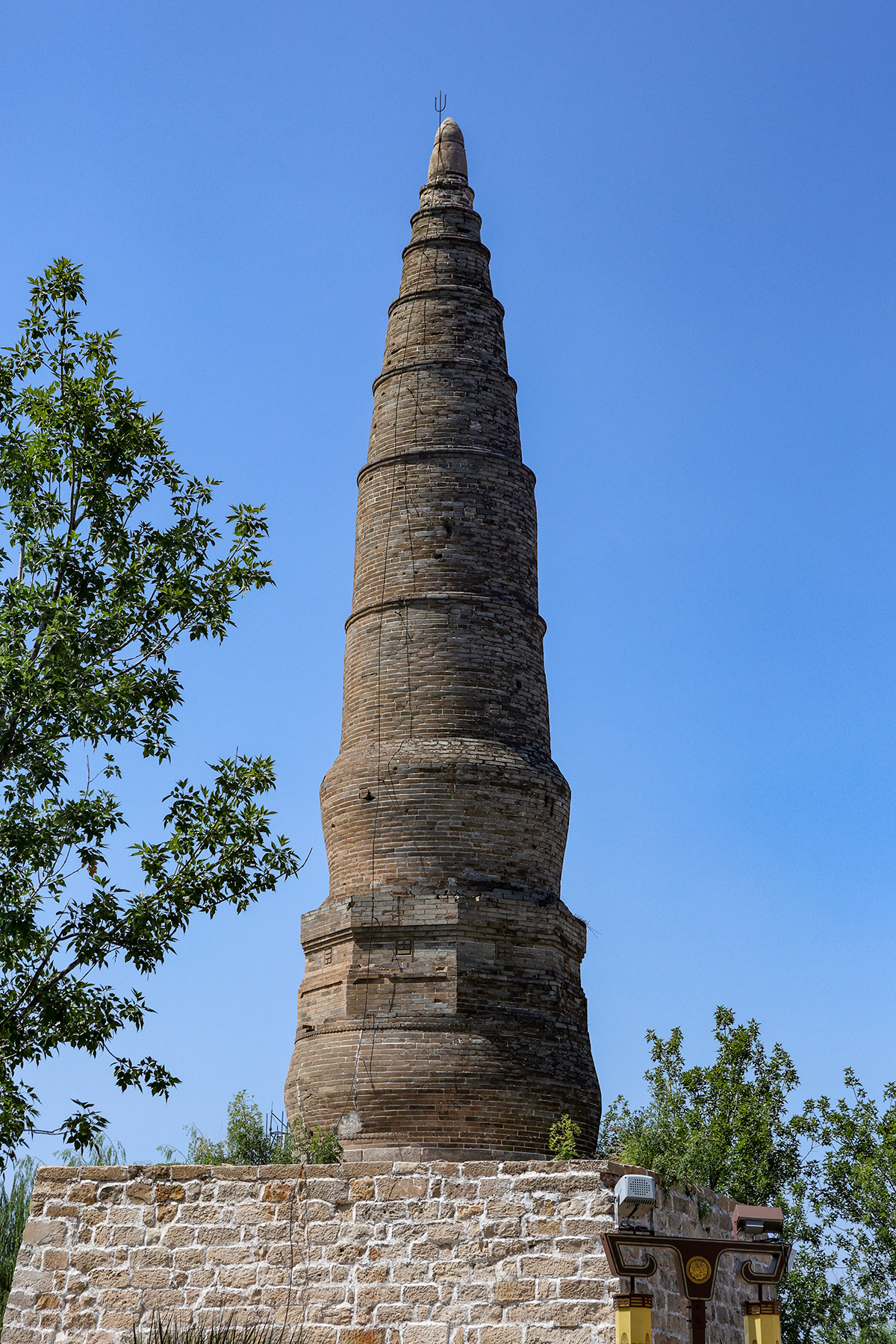
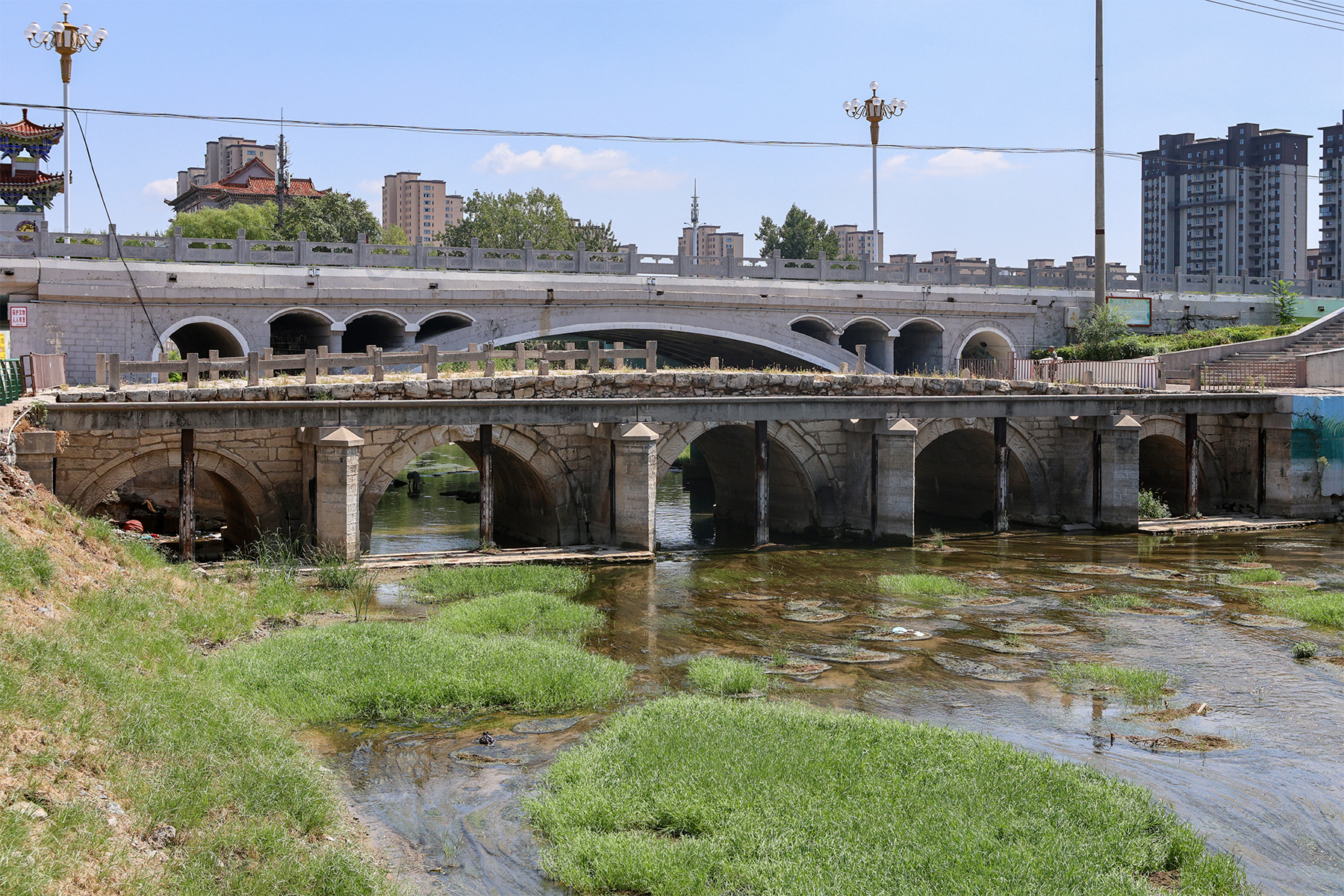
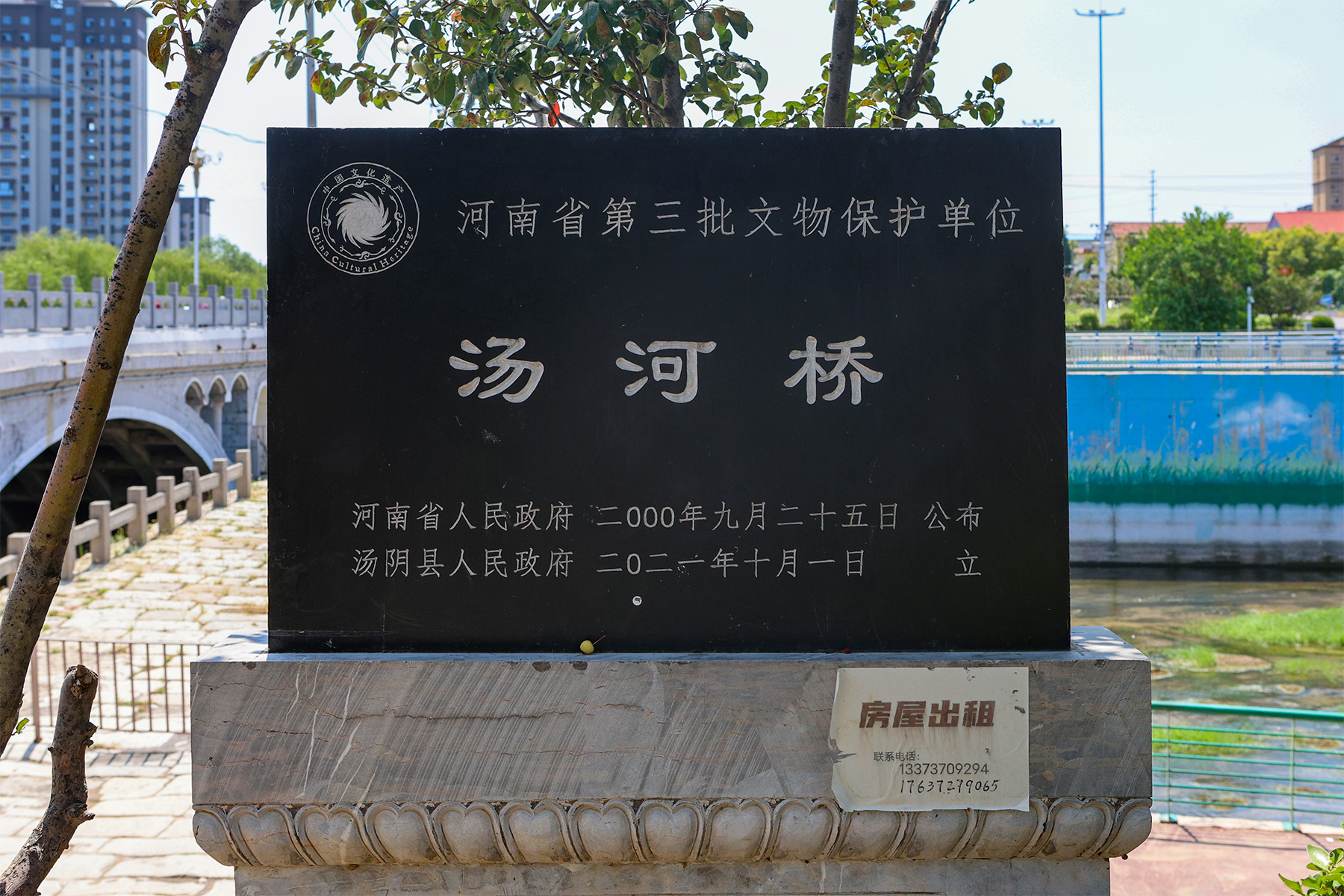

- Location of the seat in Henan
- Coordinates: 35°55′26″N 114°21′29″E
- Country: People's Republic of China
- Province: Henan
- Prefecture-level city: Anyang

Area
  - Total: 639 km^{2} (247 sq mi)

Population (2019)
  - Total: 442,700
  - Density: 693/km^{2} (1,790/sq mi)
- Time zone: UTC+8 (China Standard)
- Postal code: 456150

Tangyin County (simplified Chinese: 汤阴县; traditional Chinese: 湯陰縣; pinyin: Tāngyīn Xiàn) is a county in the north of Henan province, China. It is under the administration of Anyang City.

== Administrative divisions ==
As of 2012, this county is divided to 5 towns and 5 townships.

Towns

- Caiyuan (菜园镇)
- Chengguan (城关镇)
- Rengu (任固镇)
- Wuling (五陵镇)
- Yigou (宜沟镇)

Townships

- Baiying Township (白营乡)
- Fudao Township (伏道乡)
- Guxian Township (古贤乡)
- Hanzhuang Township (韩庄乡)
- Wagang Township (瓦岗乡)

== Climate ==
Climate data for Tangyin, elevation 93 m (305 ft), (1991–2020 normals, extremes 1981–present)
Month	Jan	Feb	Mar	Apr	May	Jun	Jul	Aug	Sep	Oct	Nov	Dec	Year
Record high °C (°F)	18.9 (66.0)	25.0 (77.0)	27.6 (81.7)	35.8 (96.4)	36.6 (97.9)	42.9 (109.2)	41.9 (107.4)	37.1 (98.8)	39.7 (103.5)	34.7 (94.5)	28.0 (82.4)	22.6 (72.7)	42.9 (109.2)
Mean daily maximum °C (°F)	4.4 (39.9)	8.7 (47.7)	14.8 (58.6)	21.0 (69.8)	26.7 (80.1)	32.5 (90.5)	32.1 (89.8)	30.4 (86.7)	27.1 (80.8)	21.5 (70.7)	12.9 (55.2)	6.3 (43.3)	19.9 (67.8)
Daily mean °C (°F)	−0.9 (30.4)	2.8 (37.0)	8.7 (47.7)	15.0 (59.0)	20.8 (69.4)	26.1 (79.0)	27.1 (80.8)	25.6 (78.1)	21.2 (70.2)	15.4 (59.7)	7.3 (45.1)	0.9 (33.6)	14.2 (57.5)
Mean daily minimum °C (°F)	−5.1 (22.8)	−1.9 (28.6)	3.3 (37.9)	9.2 (48.6)	14.8 (58.6)	20.1 (68.2)	23.0 (73.4)	21.8 (71.2)	16.4 (61.5)	10.3 (50.5)	2.6 (36.7)	−3.2 (26.2)	9.3 (48.7)
Record low °C (°F)	−20.1 (−4.2)	−18.6 (−1.5)	−9.5 (14.9)	−2.1 (28.2)	2.7 (36.9)	9.5 (49.1)	15.2 (59.4)	12.8 (55.0)	4.0 (39.2)	−1.6 (29.1)	−16.7 (1.9)	−20.0 (−4.0)	−20.1 (−4.2)
Average precipitation mm (inches)	5.0 (0.20)	9.2 (0.36)	12.7 (0.50)	35.7 (1.41)	48.9 (1.93)	67.6 (2.66)	167.5 (6.59)	117.0 (4.61)	71.5 (2.81)	26.9 (1.06)	19.9 (0.78)	5.1 (0.20)	587 (23.11)
Average precipitation days (≥ 0.1 mm)	2.8	3.4	3.4	5.2	6.6	8.3	11.2	9.7	7.6	5.8	4.6	2.4	71
Average snowy days	3.3	2.9	1.2	0.3	0	0	0	0	0	0	1.2	2.3	11.2
Average relative humidity (%)	62	59	58	64	66	60	77	80	74	66	67	65	67
Mean monthly sunshine hours	106.4	121.6	170.0	191.0	216.0	186.8	153.5	160.9	148.2	146.0	123.4	118.3	1,842.1
Percentage possible sunshine	34	39	46	48	50	43	35	39	40	42	40	39	41
Source: China Meteorological Administration
