= Chanhe, Luoyang =

Chanhe Hui District 瀍河回族区 · چًاحْ خُوِذُو ٿُو
- Ethnic district
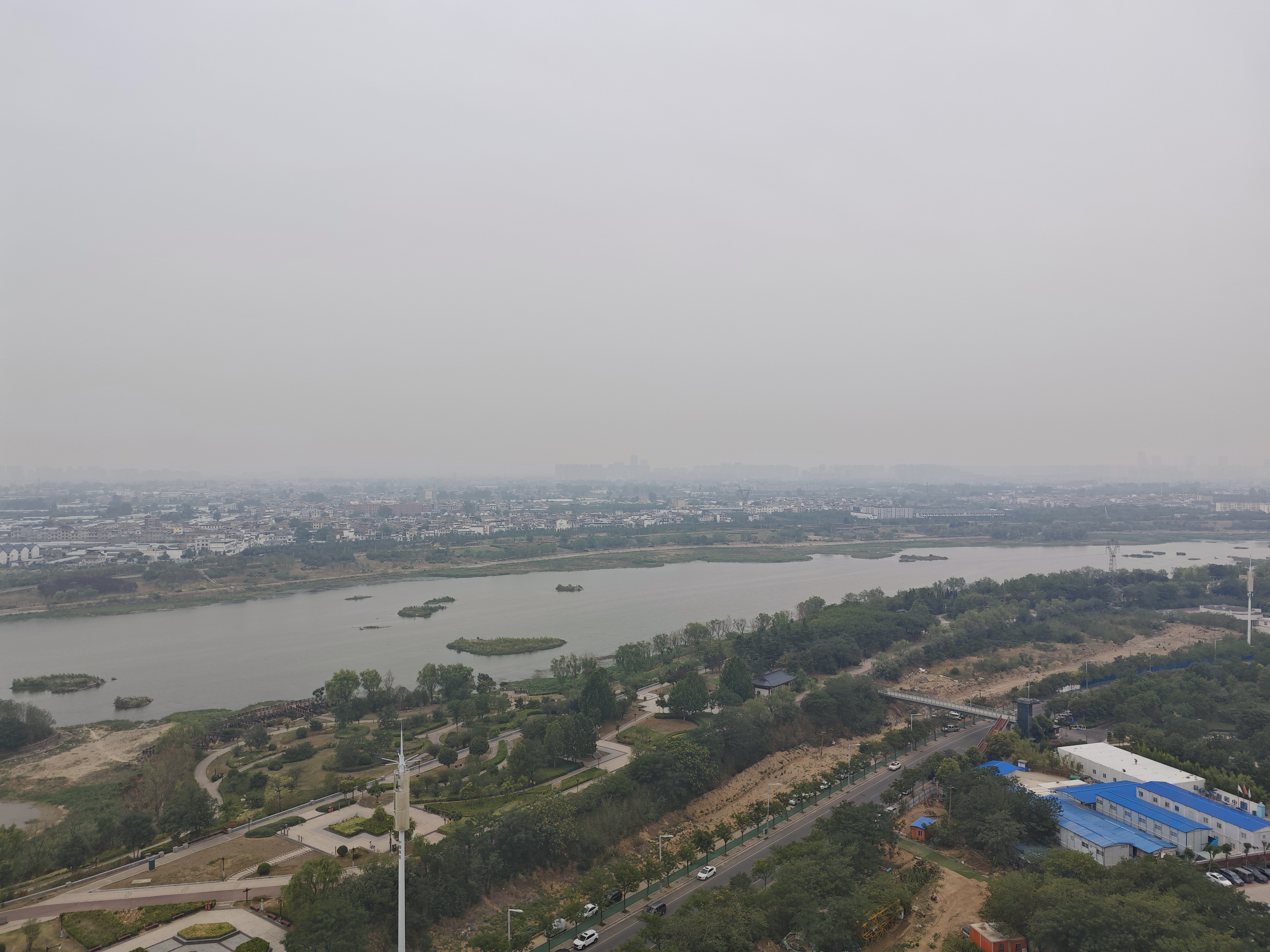
- View of Luo River and Silk Road Park, Chanhe Hui District

- Location in Henan
- Coordinates: 34°42′18″N 112°31′31″E
- Country: People's Republic of China
- Province: Henan
- Prefecture-level city: Luoyang

Area
  - Total: 29 km^{2} (11 sq mi)

Population (2019)
  - Total: 200,100
  - Density: 6,900/km^{2} (18,000/sq mi)
- Time zone: UTC+8 (China Standard)
- Postal code: 471000

Chanhe Hui District (simplified Chinese: 瀍河回族区; traditional Chinese: 瀍河回族區; pinyin: Chánhé Huízú Qū) is a district of the city of Luoyang, Henan province, China.

== Administrative divisions ==
As of 2012, this district is divided to 5 subdistricts and 1 township.

Subdistricts

- Dongguan Subdistrict (东关街道)
- Yangwen Subdistrict (杨文街道)
- Chanxi Subdistrict (瀍西街道)
- Beiyao Subdistrict (北窑街道)
- Wugulu Subdistrict (五股路街道)

Townships

- Chanhe Hui Township (瀍河回族乡)
