= Shunhe, Kaifeng =

Shunhe Hui 顺河回族区 · شٌحْ خُوِذُو ٿُو
- Ethnic district
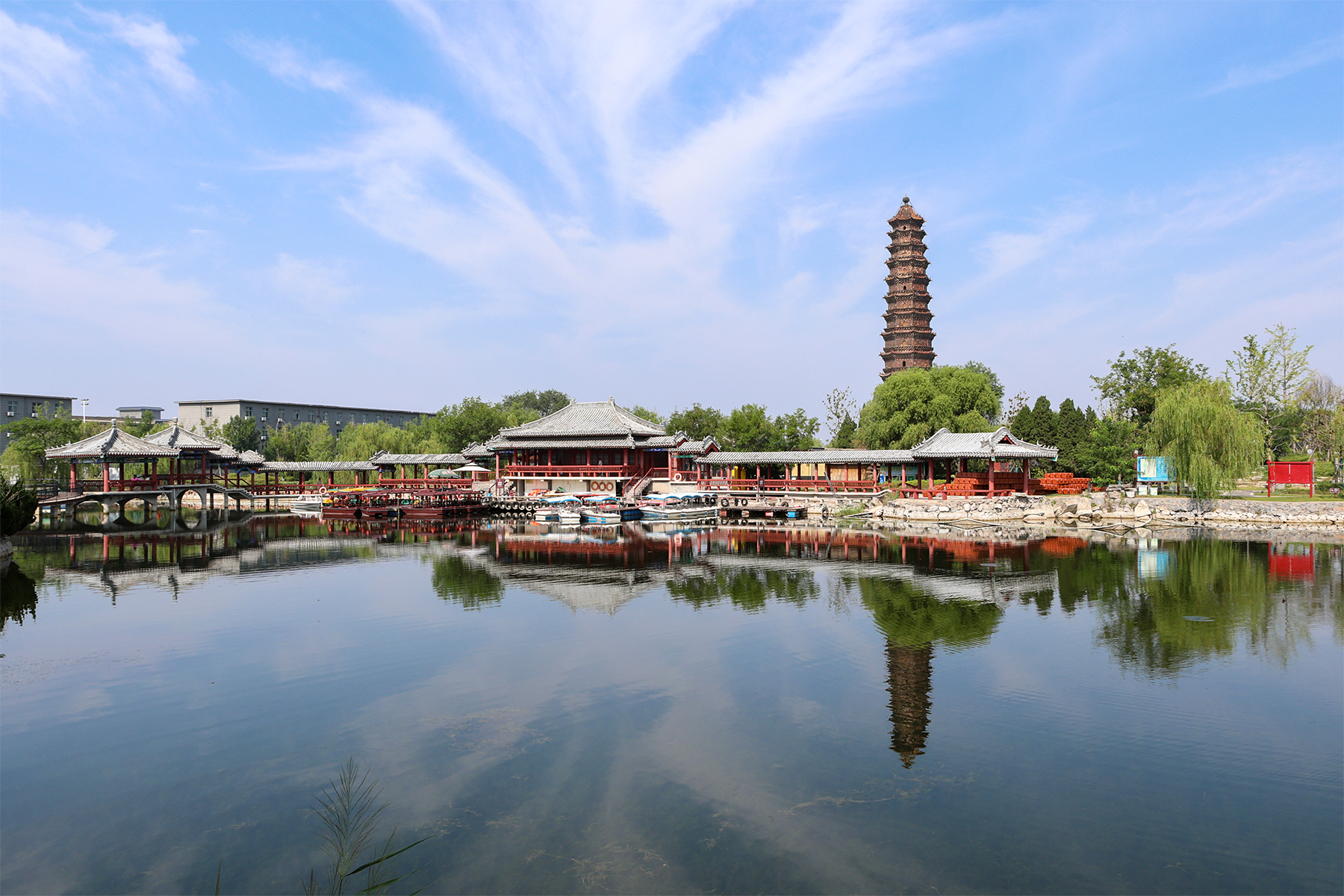
- Iron Pagoda

- Location in Henan
- Coordinates: 34°48′01″N 114°21′54″E
- Country: People's Republic of China
- Province: Henan
- Prefecture-level city: Kaifeng

Government
  - Type: Ethnic district
  - Party Secretary: Bai Haifu
  - Mayor: Sai Rui
  - Congress Chair: Rong Zhongqing
  - CPPCC Secretary: Sun Tao

Area
  - Total: 88 km^{2} (34 sq mi)

Population (2019)
  - Total: 249,900
  - Density: 2,800/km^{2} (7,400/sq mi)
- Time zone: UTC+8 (China Standard)
- Postal code: 475000

Shunhe Hui District (simplified Chinese: 顺河回族区; traditional Chinese: 順河回族區; pinyin: Shùnhé Huízú Qū) is a district of the city of Kaifeng, Henan province, China.

== Administrative divisions ==
As of 2012, this district is subdivided to 6 subdistricts and 2 towns.

Subdistricts

- Caomen Subdistrict (曹门街道)
- Gongye Subdistrict (工业街道)
- Pingguoyuan Subdistrict (苹果园街道)
- Qingping Subdistrict (清平街道)
- Songmen Subdistrict (宋门街道)
- Tieta Subdistrict (铁塔街道)

Towns

- Dongjiao Township (东郊乡)
- Tubaigang Township (土柏岗乡)
