= Municipal district (China) =

Administrative division in China

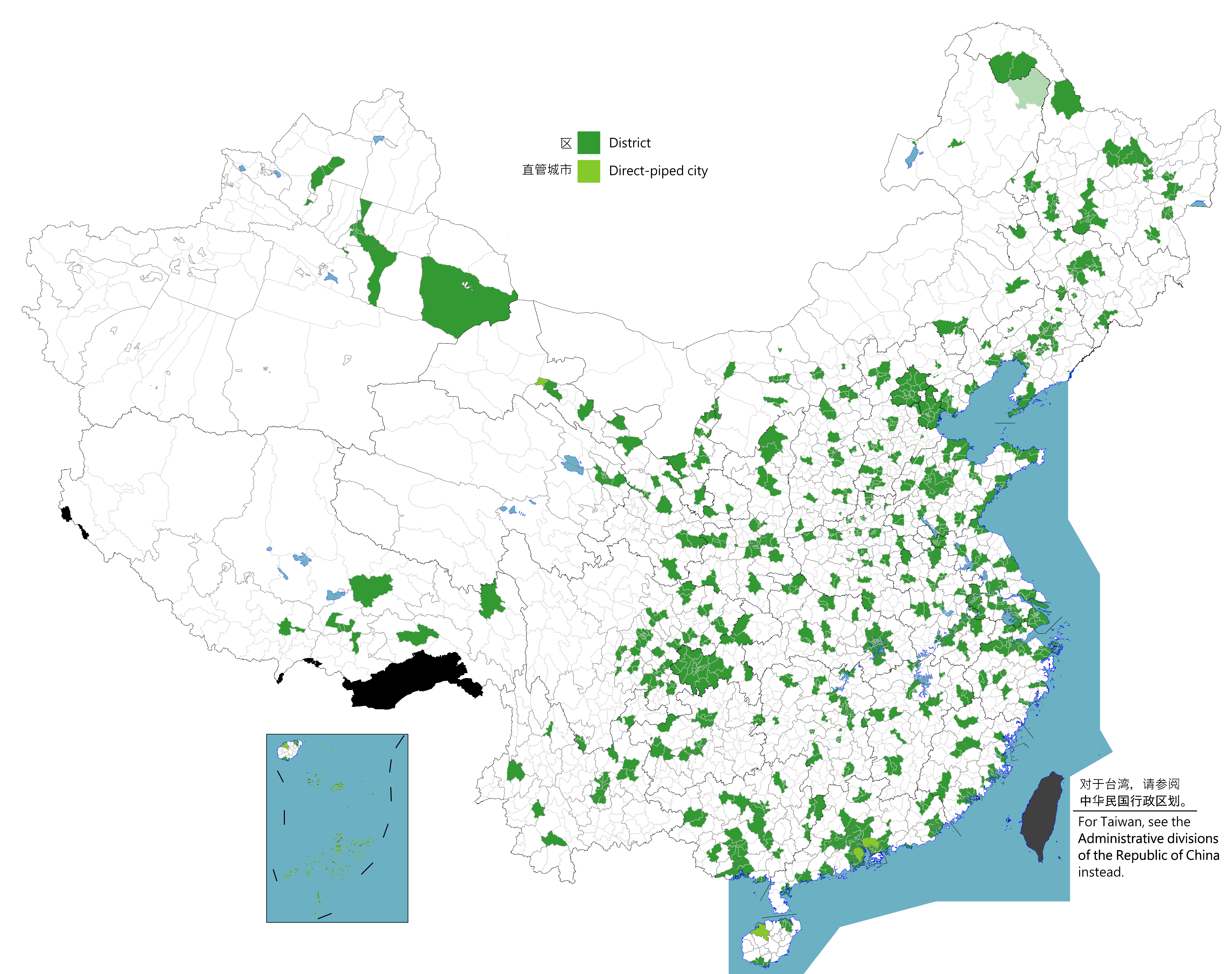

Chinese name
- Simplified Chinese: 市辖区
- Traditional Chinese: 市轄區
Transcriptions
Standard Mandarin
- Hanyu Pinyin: Shìxiáqū

Alternative Chinese name
- Simplified Chinese: 区
- Traditional Chinese: 區
Transcriptions
Standard Mandarin
- Hanyu Pinyin: Qū

Tibetan name
- Tibetan: ཆུས།
Transcriptions
- Wylie: chus
- Tibetan Pinyin: Qü

Zhuang name
- Zhuang: Gih

Korean name
- Hangul: 구
Transcriptions
- Revised Romanization: gu
- McCune–Reischauer: gu

Mongolian name
- Mongolian Cyrillic: ᠲᠣᠭᠣᠷᠢᠭ
Transcriptions
- SASM/GNC: torig

Uyghur name
- Uyghur: رايون
Transcriptions
- Latin Yëziqi: Rayon
- Siril Yëziqi: район

Manchu name
- Manchu script: ᠴᡳᠣᡳ
- Möllendorff: cioi

Kazakh name
- Kazakh: رايون район raion

Kyrghyz name
- Kyrghyz: رايون район rajon

Daur name
- Daur: orn

Oroqen name
- Oroqen: gusxa

A municipal district (市辖区), also referred to as district (区), is a subdivision of a municipality or prefecture-level city in China.

The rank of a district derives from the rank of its city. Districts of a municipality are prefecture-level; districts of a sub-provincial city are sub-prefecture-level; and districts of a prefecture-level city are county-level.

== History ==
Before the 1980s, cities in China were administrative divisions containing mostly urban, built-up areas, with very little farmland, except for the immediate suburbs in order to ensure a large supply of food or raw materials. As a result, districts were also mostly urban or suburban in nature.

After the 1980s, prefectures began to be replaced with prefecture-level cities. From then on, "cities" in mainland China became just like any other administrative division, containing urban areas, towns, villages, and farmland. These cities are subdivided into districts, counties, autonomous counties, and county-level cities. At the same time, counties and county-level cities began to be replaced with districts, especially after 1990. From then onwards, districts were no longer strictly urban entities—some districts today are just like counties, with large towns and townships under them governing rural areas.

== Types of municipal districts ==
A municipal district is a subdivision under a municipality or prefecture-level city. (Note: Including six claimed prefecture-level cities in Taiwan Province. Those are controlled by the Republic of China under its special municipalities.)

For a municipal district with ethnic minority autonomy, the name of the ethnic minority may be included in the district's name. To carry out this function, the law requires that the head of government of the ethnic district be a member of the titular ethnic minority located in the district. Currently there are five such ethnic districts: three in Henan, one in Heilongjiang, and one in Inner Mongolia.

- Chanhe Hui District
- Guancheng Hui District
- Shunhe Hui District
- Meilisi Daur District
- Huimin District (the term Huimin refers to the Hui people)

== Statistics ==
=== Ten most populous municipal districts ===
District	Population (2010 census)
Pudong, Shanghai	5,044,430
Bao'an, Shenzhen	4,017,807
Chaoyang, Beijing	3,545,137
Haidian, Beijing	3,280,670
Nanhai, Foshan	2,588,844
Binhai, Tianjin	2,482,065
Shunde, Foshan	2,461,701
Minhang, Shanghai	2,429,372
Baiyun, Guangzhou	2,223,150
Fengtai, Beijing	2,112,162

=== Number of municipal districts per city ===
Number of districts	Cities	Number of cities
25	Chongqing	1
16	Beijing, Shanghai, Tianjin	3
13	Wuhan	1
12	Chengdu	1
11	Guangzhou, Nanjing, Xi'an	3
10	Hangzhou, Jinan, Shenyang	3
9	Harbin, Shenzhen	2
8	Shijiazhuang	1
7	Tangshan, Qiqihar, Changchun, Dalian, Nanning, Ürümqi, Kunming, Qingdao	8
6	Zhangjiakou, Xiamen, Shantou, Guiyang, Jixi, Hegang, Zhengzhou, Luoyang, Changsha, Nanchang, Taiyuan, Ningbo, Guilin, Baotou, Handan, Fuzhou (FJ)	16
5	Huainan, Lanzhou, Foshan, Baoding, Daqing, Kaifeng, Yichang, Hengyang, Wuxi, Xuzhou, Changzhou, Suzhou (JS), Fuxin, Zibo, Zaozhuang, Liuzhou	16
4	Hefei, Wuhu, Bengbu, Putian, Quanzhou, Zhanjiang, Haikou, Sanya, Qinhuangdao, Shuangyashan, Yichun (HLJ), Jiamusi, Mudanjiang, Pingdingshan, Anyang, Xinxiang, Jiaozuo, Huangshi, Zhuzhou, Huai'an, Jilin, Anshan, Fushun, Benxi, Yingkou, Liaoyang, Xining, Yantai, Weifang, Datong, Zigong, Leshan, Wenzhou, Hohhot, Karamay, Baoji	36
3	Tongling, Ma'anshan, Huaibei, Anqing, Huangshan, Fuyang, Lu'an, Shaoguan, Zhuhai, Jiangmen, Zhaoqing, Chengde, Qitaihe, Hebi, Luohe, Shiyan, Xiangyang, Ezhou, Shaoyang, Yueyang, Nantong, Lianyungang, Yancheng, Yangzhou, Zhenjiang, Taizhou (JS), Jingdezhen, Dongying, Dandong, Jinzhou, Panjin, Tieling, Huludao, Tongchuan, Xianyang, Linyi, Yangquan, Panzhihua, Luzhou, Guangyuan, Nanchong, Mianyang, Shaoxing, Taizhou (ZJ), Zunyi, Wuzhou, Beihai, Guigang, Wuhai, Chifeng, Yinchuan, Ganzhou	52
2	Chuzhou, Hengshui, Sanming, Zhangzhou, Nanping, Longyan, Baiyin, Tianshui, Longnan, Maoming, Huizhou, Meizhou, Yangjiang, Qingyuan, Chaozhou, Jieyang, Yunfu, Anshun, Tongren, Xingtai, Cangzhou, Langfang, Sanmenxia, Nanyang, Shangqiu, Xinyang, Xuchang, Jingmen, Jingzhou, Xiangtan, Changde, Zhangjiajie, Yiyang, Chenzhou, Yongzhou, Suqian, Pingxiang, Jiujiang, Ji'an, Shangrao, Siping, Liaoyuan, Tonghua, Baishan, Chaoyang, Haidong, Weinan, Jining, Tai'an, Weihai, Rizhao, Dezhou, Binzhou, Heze, Yulin (SN), Changzhi, Shuozhou, Suining, Neijiang, Meishan, Yibin, Guang'an, Dazhou, Ya'an, Bazhong, Ziyang, Yuxi, Jiaxing, Huzhou, Jinhua, Quzhou, Zhoushan, Fuzhou (JX), Fangchenggang, Qinzhou, Yulin (GX), Hezhou, Hechi, Yan'an, Ordos, Hulunbuir, Shizuishan, Wuzhong, Lhasa, Qujing, Sansha	86
1	Suzhou (AH), Bozhou, Chizhou, Xuancheng, Ningde, Jinchang, Wuwei, Zhangye, Pingliang, Jiuquan, Qingyang, Dingxi, Shanwei, Heyuan, Bijie, Liupanshui, Heihe, Suihua, Puyang, Zhoukou, Zhumadian, Xiaogan, Huanggang, Xianning, Suizhou, Huaihua, Loudi, Xinyu, Yingtan, Yichun (JX), Songyuan, Baicheng, Hanzhong, Ankang, Shangluo, Liaocheng, Jincheng, Jinzhong, Yuncheng, Xinzhou, Linfen, Lüliang, Deyang, Baoshan, Zhaotong, Lijiang, Pu'er, Lincang, Lishui, Baise, Laibin, Chongzuo, Tongliao, Bayannur, Ulanqab, Guyuan, Zhongwei, Xigazê, Qamdo, Nyingchi, Shannan, Turpan, Hami	63
0	Jiayuguan, Dongguan, Zhongshan, Danzhou	4

== See also ==
- List of districts in China
- District
- Gu (administrative division) in South Korea
- Ku in Japan
