= List of township-level divisions of Henan =

Location of Henan province in China

This is a list of township-level divisions of the province of Henan, People's Republic of China (PRC). After province, prefecture, and county-level divisions, township-level divisions constitute the formal fourth-level administrative divisions of the PRC. However, this is not the case with Jiyuan City, which, as a sub-prefecture-level city, is also a county-level city under the direct administration of the provincial government; there township-level divisions form the third-level administrative division. There are a total of 2,341 such divisions in Henan, divided into 452 subdistricts, 855 towns, 6 ethnic towns, 1,016 townships, and 12 ethnic townships.

== Zhengzhou ==
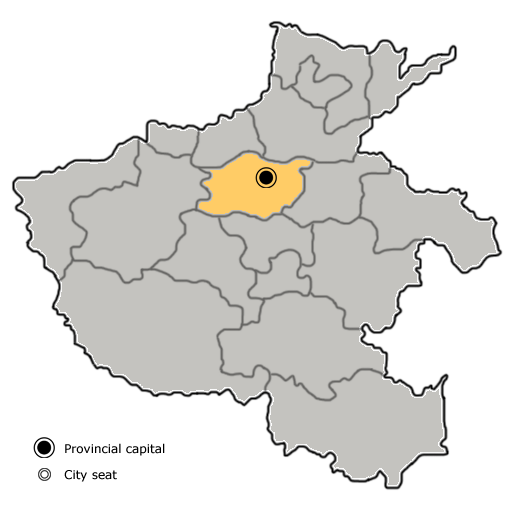
Location of Zhengzhou in the province

=== Erqi District ===
Subdistricts:

- Huaihe Road Subdistrict (淮河路街道), Jiefang Road Subdistrict (解放路街道), Minggong Road Subdistrict (铭功路街道), Yima Road Subdistrict (一马路街道), Mifengzhang Subdistrict (蜜蜂张街道), Wulibao Subdistrict (五里堡街道), Daxue Road Subdistrict (大学路街道), Jianzhong Avenue Subdistrict (建中街街道), Fuhua Avenue Subdistrict (福华街街道), Dehua Avenue Subdistrict (德化街街道), Songshan Road Subdistrict (嵩山路街道), Changjiang Road Subdistrict (长江路街道), Jingguang Road Subdistrict (京广路街道)

The only town is Mazhai (马寨镇), and the only township is Houzhai Township (侯寨乡)

=== Guancheng Hui District ===
Subdistricts:

- Beixia Avenue Subdistrict (北下街街道), Xidajie Subdistrict (西大街街道), Nanguan Subdistrict (南关街道), Chengdong Road Subdistrict (城东路街道), Dongdajie Subdistrict (东大街街道), Erligang Subdistrict (二里岗街道), Longhaima Road Subdistrict (陇海马路街道), South Zijingshan Road Subdistrict (紫荆山南路街道), East Hanghai Road Subdistrict (航海东路街道)

Towns:

- Shibalihe (十八里河镇)

Townships:

- Nancao Township (南曹乡), Putian Township (圃田乡)

=== Huiji District ===
Subdistricts:

- Xincheng Subdistrict (新城街道), Liuzhai Subdistrict (刘寨街道), Laoyachen Subdistrict (老鸦陈街道), Changxing Road Subdistrict (长兴路街道), Yingbin Road Subdistrict (迎宾路街道), Dahe Road Subdistrict (大河路街道)

Towns:

- Guying (古荥镇), Huayuankou (花园口镇)

=== Jinshui District ===
Subdistricts:

- Jingba Road Subdistrict (经八路街道), Huayuan Road Subdistrict (花园路街道), Renmin Road Subdistrict (人民路街道), Duling Avenue Subdistrict (杜岭街街道), Dashiqiao Subdistrict (大石桥街道), Nanyang Road Subdistrict (南阳路街道), Nanyang New Village Subdistrict (南阳新村街道), Wenhua Road Subdistrict (文化路街道), Fengchan Road Subdistrict (丰产路街道), Dongfeng Road Subdistrict (东风路街道), Beilin Road Subdistrict (北林路街道), Weilai Road Road Subdistrict (未来路街道), Longzihu Subdistrict (龙子湖街道), Jicheng Road Subdistrict (祭城路街道), Fenghuangtai Road Subdistrict (凤凰台街道), Xingda Road Subdistrict (兴达路街道), Yangjin Road Subdistrict (杨金路街道), Fengqing Road Subdistrict (丰庆路街道)

=== Shangjie District ===
Subdistricts:

- Jiyuan Road Subdistrict (济源路街道), Zhongxin Road Subdistrict (中心路街道), Xin'an Road Subdistrict (新安路街道), Gongye Road Subdistrict (工业路街道), Kuangshan Subdistrict (矿山街道)

The only town is Xiawo (峡窝镇)

=== Zhongyuan District ===
Subdistricts:

- Linshanzhai Subdistrict (林山寨街道), Jianshe Road Subdistrict (建设路街道), Ruhe Road Subdistrict (汝河路街道), Mianfang Road Subdistrict (棉纺路街道), Lüdongcun Subdistrict (绿东村街道), Qinling Road Subdistrict (秦岭路街道), Sanguanmiao Subdistrict (三官庙街道), Tongbai Road Subdistrict (桐柏路街道), West Hanghai Road Subdistrict (航海西路街道), West Zhongyuan Road Subdistrict (中原西路街道), Xiliuhu Subdistrict (西流湖街道), Xushui Subdistrict (须水街道)

The only town is Shifo (石佛镇), and the only township is Gouzhao Township (沟赵乡)

=== Dengfeng ===
Subdistricts:

- Songyang Subdistrict (嵩阳街道), Shaolin Subdistrict (少林街道), Zhongyue Subdistrict (中岳街道)

Towns:

- Dajindian (大金店镇), Yingyang (颖阳镇), Ludian (卢店镇), Gaocheng (告成镇), Yangchengqu (阳城区镇), Daye (大冶镇), Xuanhua (宣化镇), Xuzhuang (徐庄镇)

Townships:

- Dongjindian Township (东金店乡), Baiping Township (白坪乡), Junzhao Township (君召乡), Shidao Township (石道乡), Tangzhuang Township (唐庄乡)

=== Gongyi ===
Subdistricts:

- Xinhua Road Subdistrict (新华路街道), Dufu Road Subdistrict (杜甫路街道), Yong'an Road Subdistrict (永安路街道), Xiaoyi Subdistrict (孝义街道), Zijing Road Subdistrict (紫荆路街道)

Towns:

- Mihe (米河镇), Xinzhong (新中镇), Xiaoguan (小关镇), Zhulin (竹林镇), Dayugou (大峪沟镇), Heluo (河洛镇), Zhanjie (站街镇), Tangdian (康店镇), Beishankou (北山口镇), Xicun (西村镇), Zhitian (芝田镇), Huiguo (回郭镇), Luzhuang (鲁庄镇), Jiajinkou (夹津口镇), Shecun (涉村镇)

=== Xingyang ===
Subdistricts:

- Suohe Subdistrict (索河街道), Jingcheng Subdistrict (京城街道)

Towns:

- Qiaolou (乔楼镇), Yulong (豫龙镇), Guangwu (广武镇), Wangcun (王村镇), Sishui (汜水镇), Gaoshan (高山镇), Liuhe (刘河镇), Cuimiao (崔庙镇), Jiayu (贾峪镇)

Townships:

- Chengguan Township (城关乡), Gaocun Township (高村乡), Jinzhai Hui Ethnic Township (金寨回族乡)

=== Xinmi ===
Subdistricts:

- Qingpin Avenue Subdistrict (青屏街街道), Xinhua Road Subdistrict (新华路街道), Xidajie Subdistrict (西大街街道), Kuangqu Subdistrict (矿区街道)

Towns:

- Chengguan (城关镇), Niudian (牛店镇), Pingmo (平陌镇), Chaohua (超化镇), Goutang (苟堂镇), Dawei (大隗镇), Liuzhai (刘寨镇), Baizhai (白寨镇), Yuecun (岳村镇), Laiji (来集镇), Micun (米村镇)

Townships:

- Yuanzhuang Township (袁庄乡), Quliang Township (曲梁乡)

Other: Jianshan Scenic Area (尖山风景区)

=== Xinzheng ===
Subdistricts:

- Xinjian Road Subdistrict (新建路街道), Xinhua Road Subdistrict (新华路街道), Xinyan Subdistrict (新烟街道)

Towns:

- Xincun (新村镇), Xindian (辛店镇), Guanyinsi (观音寺镇), Lihe (梨河镇), Hezhuang (和庄镇), Xuedian (薛店镇), Mengzhuang (孟庄镇), Guodian (郭店镇), Longhu (龙湖镇)

Townships:

- Chengguan Township (城关乡), Baqian Township (八千乡), Longwang Township (龙王乡)

=== Zhongmu County ===
Subdistricts:

- Qingnian Road Subdistrict (青年路街道), Dongfeng Road Subdistrict (东风路街道)

Towns:

- Hansi (韩寺镇), Guandu (官渡镇), Langchenggang (狼城岗镇), Wantan (万滩镇), Baisha (白沙镇), Zheng'an (郑庵镇), Zhangzhuang (张庄镇), Huangdian (黄店镇), Dameng (大孟镇), Jiulong (九龙镇), Liuji (刘集镇), Bagang (八岗镇), Yanminghu (雁鸣湖镇), Yaojia (姚家镇), Sanguanmiao (三官庙镇)

The only township is Diaojia Township (刁家乡)

== Anyang ==
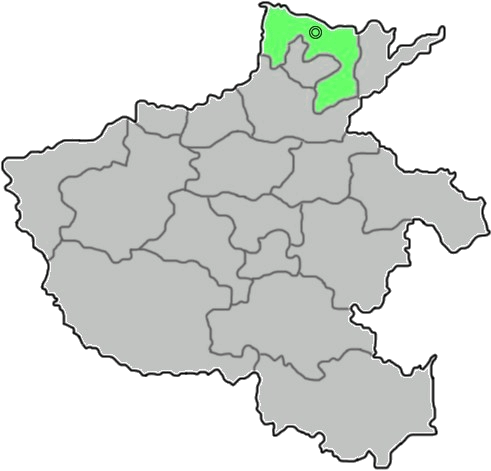
Location of Anyang in the province

=== Beiguan District ===
Subdistricts:

- Dengta Road Subdistrict (灯塔路街道), Doufuying Subdistrict (豆腐营街道), Hongqi Road Subdistrict (红旗路街道), Huanbei Subdistrict (洹北街道), Jiefang Road Subdistrict (解放路街道), Minhang Road Subdistrict (民航路街道), Shuguang Road Subdistrict (曙光路街道), Zhangdong Subdistrict (彰东街道), Zhangbei Subdistrict (彰北街道)

=== Long'an District ===
Subdistricts:

- Taihangxiaoqu Subdistrict (太行小区街道), Tiancun Subdistrict (田村街道), Wenchang Avenue Subdistrict (文昌大道街道), Wenming Avenue Subdistrict (文明大道街道), Zhangwu Subdistrict (彰武街道), Zhongzhou Road Subdistrict (中州路街道)

The only town is Longquan (龙泉镇)

Townships:

- Dongfeng Township (东风乡), Matoujian Township (马投涧乡)

=== Wenfeng District ===
Subdistricts:

- Baoliansi Subdistrict (宝莲寺镇), Beidajie Subdistrict (北大街街道), Dongdajie Subdistricts (东大街街道), Guanghua Road Subdistrict (光华路街道), Nanguan Subdistrict (南关街道), Tianshuijing Subdistrict (甜水井街道), Tou'ersan Subdistrict (头二三街道), Xidajie Subdistrict (西大街街道), Xiguan Subdistrict (西关街道), Yongming Road Subdistrict (永明路街道), Zhonghua Road Subdistrict (中华路街道), Ziwei Avenue Subdistrict (紫薇大道街道)

The only township is Gaozhuang Township (高庄乡)

=== Yindu District ===
Subdistricts:

- Beimeng Subdistrict (北蒙街道), Dianchang Road Subdistrict (电厂路街道), Lizhen Subdistrict (李珍街道), Meiyuanzhuang Subdistrict (梅园庄街道), Qingfeng Avenue Subdistrict (清风街街道), Shachang Subdistrict (纱厂街道), Shuiye Subdistrict (水冶街道), Tiexi Road Subdistrict (铁西路街道), Xiangtai Subdistrict (相台街道)

The only township is Xijiao Township (西郊乡)

=== Linzhou ===
Subdistricts:

- Guiyuan Subdistrict (桂园街道), Longshan Subdistrict (龙山街道), Kaiyuan Subdistrict (开元街道), Zhenlin Subdistrict (振林街道)

Towns:

- Caisang (采桑镇), Donggang (东岗镇), Dongyao (东姚镇), Guilin (桂林镇), Hejian (合涧镇), Hengshui (横水镇), Heshun (河顺镇), Lingyang (陵阳镇), Linqi (临淇镇), Rencun (任村镇), Wulong (五龙镇), Yaocun (姚村镇), Yuankang (原康镇)

Townships:

- Chadian Township (茶店乡), Chengjiao Township (城郊乡), Shiban Township (石板岩乡)

=== Anyang County ===
Towns:

- Baibi (白壁镇), Baizhuang (柏庄镇), Cuijiaqiao (崔家桥镇), Lücun (吕村镇), Qugou (曲沟镇), Shanying (善应镇), Shuiye (水冶镇), Tongye (铜冶镇)

Townships:

- Anfeng Township (安丰乡), Beiguo Township (北郭乡), Duli Township (都里乡), Hanling Township (韩陵乡), Honghetun Township (洪河屯乡), Jiangcun Township (蒋村乡), Leikou Township (磊口乡), Lunzhang Township (伦掌乡), Majia Township (马家乡), Wadian Township (瓦店乡), Xincun Township (辛村乡), Xujiagou Township (许家沟乡), Yonghe Township (永和乡)

=== Hua County ===
Towns:

- Baidaokou (白道口镇), Chengguan (城关镇), Daokou (道口镇), Gaoping (高平镇), Laodian (老店镇), Liugu (留固镇), Niutun (牛屯镇), Shangguan (上官镇), Wangu (万古镇), Wangzhuang (王庄镇)

Townships:

- Baliying Township (八里营乡), Banpodian Township (半坡店乡), Cizhouzhai Township (慈周寨乡), Dazhai Township (大寨乡), Jiaohu Township (焦虎乡), Laoyemiao Township (老爷庙乡), Sangcun Township (桑村乡), Sijianfang Township (四间房乡), Wagangzhai Township (瓦岗寨乡), Xiaopu Township (小铺乡), Zaocun Township (枣村乡), Zhaoying Township (赵营乡)

=== Neihuang County ===
Towns:

- Chengguan (城关镇), Chuwang (楚旺镇), Dongzhuang (东庄镇), Houhe (后河镇), Jingdian (井店镇), Liangzhuang (梁庄镇), Tianshi (田氏镇)

Townships:

- Bocheng Township (亳城乡), Dougong Township (豆公乡), Er'an Township (二安乡), Gaodi Township (高堤乡), Liucun Township (六村乡), Mashang Township (马上乡), Shipantun Township (石盘屯乡), Songcun Township (宋村乡), Zhanglong Township (张龙乡), Zhongzhao Township (中召乡)

=== Tangyin County ===
Towns:

- Caiyuan (菜园镇), Chengguan (城关镇), Rengu (任固镇), Wuling (五陵镇), Yigou (宜沟镇)

Townships:

- Baiying Township (白营乡), Fudao Township (伏道乡), Guxian Township (古贤乡), Hanzhuang Township (韩庄乡), Wagang Township (瓦岗乡)

== Hebi ==
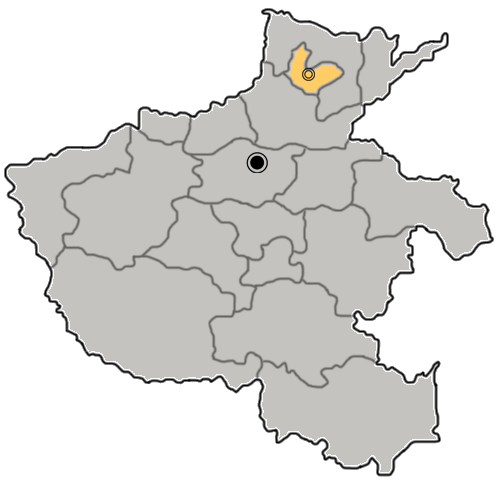
Location of Hebi in the province

=== Heshan District ===
Subdistricts:

- Heshan Road Subdistrict (鹤山街街道), Jiukuang Square Subdistrict (九矿广场街道), Xinhua Avenue Subdistrict (新华街街道), Zhongshan Road Subdistrict (中山路街道), North Zhongshan Road Subdistrict (中山北路街道)

The only town is Hebiji (鹤壁集镇), and the only township is Jijiashan Township (姬家山乡)

=== Qibin District ===
The only subdistrict is Jinshan Subdistrict (金山街道)

Towns:

- Dalaidian (大赉店镇), Jiuqiao (钜桥镇)

Townships:

- Dahejian Township (大河涧乡), Shangyu Township (上峪乡)

Other:

- Qibin Economic and Technological Development Zone (淇滨经济技术开发区)

=== Shancheng District ===
Subdistricts:

- Central Changfeng Road Subdistrict (长风中路街道), Hongqi Subdistrict (红旗街道), Lulou Subdistrict (鹿楼街道), Shancheng Road Subdistrict (山城路街道), Tanghe Avenue Subdistrict (汤河街街道)

The only town is Shilin (石林镇), and the only township is Lulou Township (鹿楼乡)

=== Qi County, Hebi ===
Subdistricts:

- Lingshan Subdistrict (灵山街道), Qiaomeng Subdistrict (桥盟街道), Weidu Subdistrict (卫都街道), Zhaoge Subdistrict (朝歌街道)

Towns:

- Beiyang (北阳镇), Gaocun (高村镇), Miaokou (庙口镇), Xigang (西岗镇)

The only township is Huangdong Township (黄洞乡)

=== Xun County ===
Towns:

- Chengguan (城关镇), Liyang (黎阳镇), Shantang (善堂镇), Tunzi (屯子镇), Weixian (卫贤镇), Xiaohe (小河镇), Xinzhen (新镇镇)

Townships:

- Baisi Township (白寺乡), Wangzhuang Township (王庄乡)

== Jiaozuo ==
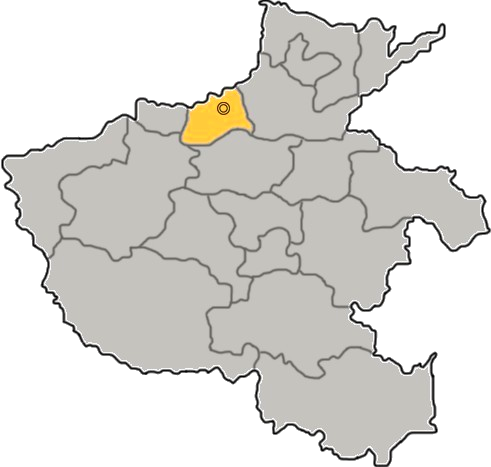
Location of Jiaozuo in the province

=== Jiefang District ===
Subdistricts:

- Jiaobei Subdistrict (焦北街道), Jiaonan Subdistrict (焦南街道), Jiaoxi Subdistrict (焦西街道), Minsheng Subdistrict (民生街道), Minzhu Subdistrict (民主街道), Qibaijian Subdistrict (七百间街道), Shangbaizuo Subdistrict (上白作街道), Wangzhe Subdistrict (王褚街道), Xinhua Subdistrict (新华街道)

=== Macun District ===
Subdistricts:

- Anyangcheng Subdistrict (安阳城街道), Beishan Subdistrict (北山街道), Daiwang Subdistrict (待王街道), Fengying Subdistrict (冯营街道), Jiulishan Subdistrict (九里山街道), Macun Subdistrict (马村街道), Yanma Subdistrict (演马街道)

=== Shanyang District ===
Subdistricts:

- Baijianfang Subdistrict (百间房街道), Dinghe Subdistrict (定和街道), Dongfanghong Subdistrict (东方红街道), Guangya Subdistrict (光亚街道), Jiaodong Subdistrict (焦东街道), Liwan Subdistrict (李万街道), Taihang Subdistrict (太行街道), Xincheng Subdistrict (新城街道), Yixing Subdistrict (艺新街道), Zhongxing Subdistrict (中星街道)

=== Zhongzhan District ===
Subdistricts:

- Danhe Subdistrict (丹河街道), Fengfeng Subdistrict (冯封街道), Fucheng Subdistrict (府城街道), Lifeng Subdistrict (李封街道), Longdong Subdistrict (龙洞街道), Longxiang Subdistrict (龙翔街道), Wangfeng Subdistrict (王封街道), Xuheng Subdistrict (许衡街道), Yueshan Subdistrict (月山街道), Zhucun Subdustrict (朱村街道)

=== Mengzhou ===
Subdistricts:

- Dading Subdistrict (大定街道), Heyang Subdistrict (河阳街道), Heyong Subdistrict (河雍街道), Huichang Subdistrict (会昌街道)

Towns:

- Chengbo (城伯镇), Gudan (谷旦镇), Huagong (化工镇), Huaishu (槐树乡), Nanzhuang (南庄镇), Xiguo (西虢镇), Zhaohe (赵和镇)

=== Qinyang ===
Subdistricts:

- Qinyuan Subdistrict (沁园街道), Taihang Subdistrict (太行街道), Tanhuai Subdistrict (覃怀街道), Huaiqing Subdistrict (怀庆街道)

Towns:

- Baixiang (柏香镇), Chongyi (崇义镇), Shanwangzhuang (山王庄镇), Xifang (西万镇), Xixiang (西向镇), Ziling (紫陵镇)

Townships:

- Changping Township (常平乡), Wangqu Township (王曲乡), Wangzhao Township (王召乡)

=== Bo'ai County ===
Towns:

- Baishan (柏山镇), Motou (磨头镇), Qinghua (清化镇), Xiaojing (孝敬镇), Xuliang (许良镇), Yangmiao (阳庙镇), Yueshan (月山镇)

Townships:

- Jincheng Township (金城乡), Sujiazuo Township (苏家作乡), Zhaihuo Township (寨豁乡)

=== Wen County ===
Towns:

- Fantian (番田镇), Huangzhuang (黄庄镇), Nanzhangqiang (南张羌镇), Wenquan (温泉镇), Wude (武德镇), Xiangyun (祥云镇), Zhaobao (赵堡镇)

Townships:

- Beileng Township (北冷乡), Yuecun Township (岳村乡), Zhaoxian Township (招贤乡)

=== Wuzhi County ===
Towns:

- Dafeng (大封镇), Longyuan (龙源镇), Mucheng (木城镇), Ningguo (宁郭镇), Xieqiying (谢旗营镇), Xitao (西陶镇), Zhandian (詹店镇)

Townships:

- Beiguo Township (北郭乡), Dahongqiao Township (大虹桥乡), Gedangdian Township (圪垱店乡), Guanmiao Township (乔庙乡), Jiaying Township (嘉应观乡), Sanyang Township (三阳乡), Xiaodong Township (小董乡)

=== Xiuwu County ===
Towns:

- Chengguan (城关镇), Xunfeng (郇封镇)

Townships:

- Anshang Township (岸上乡), Gaocun Township (高村乡), Qixian Township (七贤镇), Wuliyuan Township (五里源乡), Xicun Township (西村乡), Zhouzhuang Township (周庄乡)

== Jiyuan ==
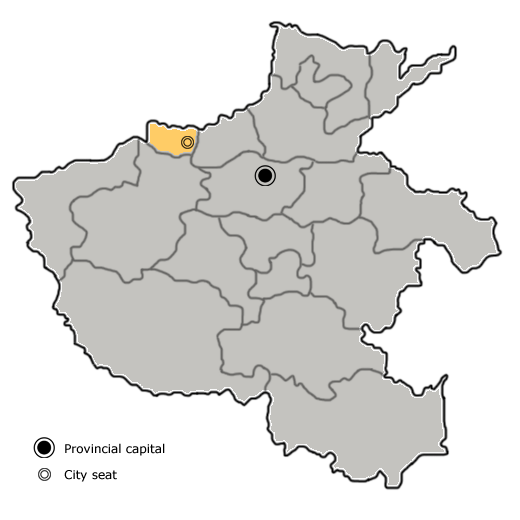
Location of Jiyuan in the province

Subdistricts:

- Beihai Subdistrict (北海街道), Jishui Subdistrict (济水街道), Qinyuan Subdistrict (沁园街道), Tiantan Subdistrict (天坛街道), Yuquan Subdistrict (玉泉街道)

Towns:

- Chengliu (承留镇), Dayu (大峪镇), Kejing (克井镇), Lilin (梨林镇), Potou (坡头镇), Shaoyuan (邵原镇), Sili (思礼镇), Wangwu (王屋镇), Wulongkou (五龙口镇), Xiaye (下冶镇), Zhicheng (轵城镇)

== Kaifeng ==
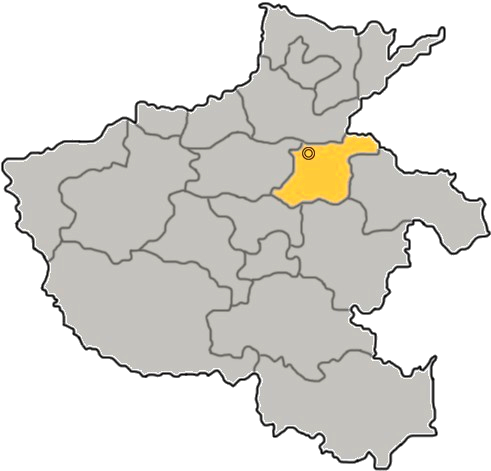
Location of Kaifeng in the province

=== Gulou District ===
Subdistricts:

- Jiucun Subdistrict (九村街道), Wolong Subdistrict (卧龙街道), Wuyi Subdistrict (五一街道), Xiangguosi Subdistrict (相国寺街道), Xianrenzhuang Subdistrict (仙人庄街道), Xinhua Subdistrict (新华街道), Xisimen Subdistrict (西司门街道), Zhouqiao Subdistrict (州桥街道)

=== Jinming District ===
Subdistricts:

- Chengxi Subdistrict (城西街道), Liangyuan Subdistrict (梁苑街道)

The only town is Xinghuaying (杏花营镇)

Townships:

- Shuidao Township (水稻乡), Xijiao Township (西郊乡)

=== Longting District ===
Subdistricts:

- Beidaomen Subdistrict (北道门街道), Beishudian Subdistrict (北书店街道), Daxing Subdistrict (大兴街道), Xuchaomen Subdistrict (午朝门街道)

Townships:

- Beijiao Township (北郊乡), Liuyuankou Township (柳园口乡)

=== Shunhe Hui District ===
Subdistricts:

- Caomen Subdistrict (曹门街道), Gongye Subdistrict (工业街道), Pingguoyuan Subdistrict (苹果园街道), Qingping Subdistrict (清平街道), Songmen Subdistrict (宋门街道), Tieta Subdistrict (铁塔街道)

Townships

- Dongjiao Township (东郊乡), Tubaigang Township (土柏岗乡)

=== Yuwangtai District ===
Subdistricts:

- Caishi Subdistrict (菜市街道), Fanta Subdistrict (繁塔街道), Guanfang Subdistrict (官坊街道), Sanlibao Subdistrict (三里堡街道), Xinmenguan Subdistrict (新门关街道)

Townships:

- Nanjiao Township (南郊乡), Wangtun Township (汪屯乡)

=== Kaifeng County ===
Towns:

- Baliwan (八里湾镇), Chengguan (城关镇), Chenliu (陈留镇), Qiulou (仇楼镇), Quxing (曲兴镇), Zhuxian (朱仙镇)

Townships:

- Banpodian Township (半坡店乡), Duliang Township (杜良乡), Fancun Township (范村乡), Liudian Township (刘店乡), Luowang Township (罗王乡), Wanlong Township (万隆乡), Xijiangzhai Township (西姜寨乡), Xinglong Township (兴隆乡), Yuanfang Township (袁坊乡)

=== Lankao County ===
Towns:

- Chengguan (城关镇), Guyang (固阳镇), Hongmiao (红庙镇), Nanzhang (南彰镇), Zhangjunmu (张君墓镇)

Townships:

- Batou Township (坝头乡), Chengguan Township (城关乡), Guying Township (谷营乡), Mengzhai Township (孟寨乡), Putaojia Township (葡萄架乡), Sanyizhai Township (三义寨乡), Xiaosong Township (小宋乡), Xuhe Township (许河乡), Yanlou Township (阎楼乡), Yifeng Township (仪封乡), Zhuaying Township (爪营乡)

=== Qi County, Kaifeng ===
Towns:

- Chengguan (城关镇), Fuji (傅集镇), Gaoyang (高阳镇), Gegang (葛岗镇), Wulihe (五里河镇), Xingkou (邢口镇, Yanggu (阳固镇), Yuzhen (圉镇镇)

Townships:

- Banmu Township (板木乡), Chengjiao Township (城郊乡), Guanzhuang Township (官庄乡), Hugang Township (湖岗乡), Nigou Township (泥沟乡), Peicundian Township (裴村店乡), Pingcheng Township (平城乡), Shawo Township (沙沃乡), Shiyuan Township (柿元乡), Sumu Township (苏木乡), Xizhai Township (西寨乡), Zhulin Township (竹林乡), Zongdian Township (宗店乡)

=== Tongxu County ===
Towns:

- Changzhi (长智镇), Chengguan (城关镇), Shugang (竖岗镇), Sisuolou (四所楼镇), Yuhuangmiao (玉皇庙镇), Zhusha (朱砂镇)

Townships:

- Dagangli Township (大岗李乡), Dige Township (邸阁乡), Fengzhuang Township (冯庄乡), Liancheng Township (练城乡), Lizhuang Township (厉庄乡), Sunying Township (孙营乡)

=== Weishi County ===
Towns:

- Chengguan (城关镇), Caizhuang (蔡庄镇), Shibali (十八里镇), Shuipo (水坡镇), Weichuan (洧川镇), Yongxing (永兴镇), Zhangshi (张市镇), Zhuqu (朱曲镇), Daying (大营镇)

Townships:

- Dama Township (大马乡), Daqiao Township (大桥乡), Gangli Township (岗李乡), Menlouren Township (门楼任乡), Nancao Township (南曹乡), Xiaochen Township (小陈乡), Xingzhuang Township (邢庄乡), Zhuangtou Township (庄头乡)

== Luohe ==
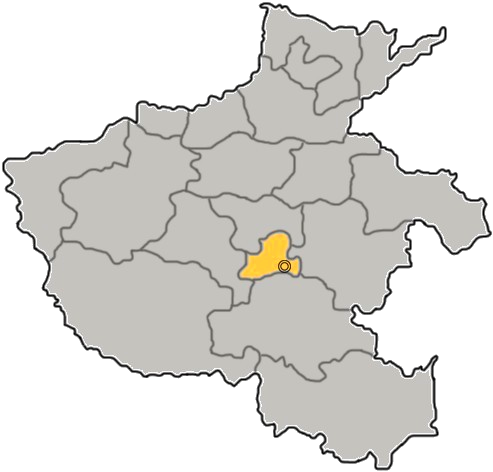
Location of Luohe in the province

=== Shaoling District ===
Subdistricts:

- Dizhuang Subdistrict (翟庄街道), Tianqiao Avenue Subdistrict (天桥街街道)

Towns:

- Dengxiang (邓襄镇), Jishi (姬石镇), Laowo (老窝镇), Shaoling (召陵镇), Wanjin (万金镇)

Townships:

- Houxie Township (后谢乡), Qingniancun Township (青年村乡)

=== Yancheng District ===
The only subdistrict is Shabei Subdistrict (沙北街道)

Towns:

- Chengguan (城关镇), Longcheng (龙城镇), Mengmiao (孟庙镇), Peicheng (裴城镇), Shangqiao (商桥镇), Xindian (新店镇)

Townships:

- Heilongtan Township (黑龙潭乡), Liji Township (李集乡)

=== Yuanhui District ===
Subdistricts:

- Ganhechen Subdistrict (干河陈街道), Laojie Subdistrict (老街街道), Malu Avenue Subdistrict (马路街街道), Shunhe Avenue Subdistrict (顺河街街道)

The only town is Daliu (大刘镇)

Townships:

- Kongzhongguo Township (空冢郭乡), Wenshi Township (问十乡), Yinyangzhao Township (阴阳赵乡)

=== Linying County ===
Towns:

- Chengguan (城关镇), Duqu (杜曲镇), Fancheng (繁城镇), Juling (巨陵镇), Sanjiadian (三家店镇), Taichen (台陈镇), Wadian (瓦店镇), Fanggang (王岗镇), Wocheng (窝城镇)

Townships:

- Chenzhuang Township (陈庄乡), Daguo Township (大郭乡), Guxiang Township (固厢乡), Huangdimiao Township (皇帝庙乡), Shiqiao Township (石桥乡), Wangmeng Township (王孟乡)

=== Wuyang County ===
Towns:

- Beiwudu (北舞渡镇), Lianhua (莲花镇), Mengzhai (孟寨镇), Taiwei (太尉镇), Wucheng (吴城镇), Wuquan (舞泉镇), Xin'an (辛安镇)

Townships:

- Baohe Township (保和乡), Houji Township (侯集乡), Jiangdian Township (姜店乡), Jiujie Township (九街乡), Macun Township (马村乡), Wenfeng Township (文峰乡), Zhanghua Township (章化乡)

== Luoyang ==
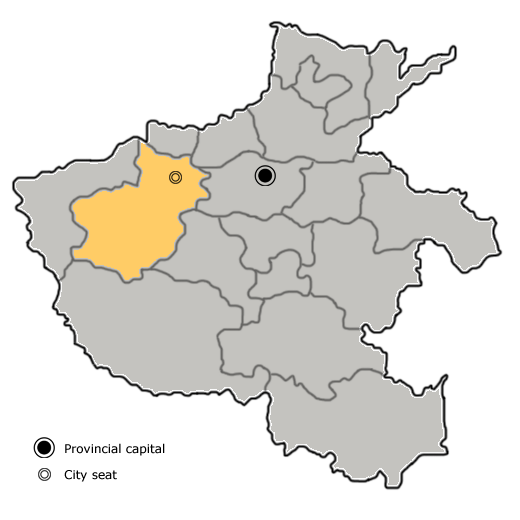
Location of Luoyang in the province

=== Chanhe Hui District ===
Subdistricts:

- Dongguan Subdistrict (东关街道), Yangwen Subdistrict (杨文街道), Chanxi Subdistrict (瀍西街道), Beiyao Subdistrict (北窑街道), Wugu Road Subdistrict (五股路街道)

The only township is Chanhe Hui Ethnic Township (瀍河回族乡)

=== Jianxi District ===
Subdistricts:

- Hubei Road Subdistrict (湖北路街道), Changchun Road Subdistrict (长春路街道), Tianjin Road Subdistrict (天津路街道), Chongqing Road Subdistrict (重庆路街道), Chang'an Road Subdistrict (长安路街道), Wuhan Road Subdistrict (武汉路街道), Zhengzhou Road Subdistrict (郑州路街道), Zhujiang Road Subdistrict (珠江路街道), Nanchang Road Subdistrict (南昌路街道), Zhoushan Road Subdistrict (周山路街道), Xujiaying Subdistrict (徐家营街道)

=== Jili District ===
The only two subdivisions are Daqing Road Subdistrict (大庆路街道) and Jili Township (吉利乡)

=== Laocheng District ===
Subdistricts:

- Xibeiyu Subdistrict (西北隅街道), Xinanyu Subdistrict (西南隅街道), Dongbeiyu Subdistrict (东北隅街道), Dongnanyu Subdistrict (东南隅街道), Xiguan Subdistrict (西关街道), Nanguan Road Subdistrict (南关路街道)

=== Luolong District ===
Subdistricts:

- Anle Subdistrict (安乐街道), Kaiyuan Road Subdistrict (开元路街道), Longmen Grottoes Subdistrict (龙门石窟街道)

Towns:

- Longmen (龙门镇), Baimasi (白马寺镇), Guanlin (关林镇), Anle Town (安乐镇), Xindian (辛店镇), Licun (李村镇), Zhuge (诸葛镇), Lilou (李楼镇)

The only township is Gucheng Township (古城乡)

=== Xigong District ===
Subdistricts:

- Wangcheng Road Subdistrict (王城路街道), Xigong Subdistrict (西工街道), East Kaixuan Road Subdistrict (凯旋东路街道), Jinguyuan Subdistrict (金谷园街道), Daobei Road Subdistrict (道北路街道), Mangling Road Subdistrict (邙岭路街道), Hantun Road Subdistrict (汉屯路街道), Tanggong Road Subdistrict (唐宫路街道)

Townships:

- Luobei Township (洛北乡), Hongshan Township (红山乡)

=== Yanshi ===
Towns:

- Chengguan (城关镇), Shouyangshan (首阳山镇), Dianzhuang (佃庄镇), Zhaizhen (翟镇镇), Yuetan (岳滩镇), Guxian (顾县镇), Goushi (缑氏镇), Fudian (府店镇), Gaolong (高龙镇), Koudian (寇店镇), Pangcun (庞村镇)

Townships:

- Shanhua Township (山化乡), Mangling Township (邙岭乡), Dakou Township (大口乡)

=== Luanchuan County ===
Towns:

- Chengguan (城关镇), Chitudian (赤土店镇), Heyu (合峪镇), Tantou (潭头镇), Sanchuan (三川镇), Lengshui (冷水镇), Taowan (陶湾镇)

Townships:

- Luanchuan Township (栾川乡), Miaozi Township (庙子乡), Qiuba Township (秋扒乡), Shizimiao Township (狮子庙乡), Baitu Township (白土乡), Jiaohe Township (叫河乡), Shimiao Township (石庙乡)

=== Luoning County ===
Twelve towns:

- Chengguan (城关镇), Wangfan Hui Town (王范回族镇), Shangge (上戈镇), Xiayu (下峪镇), Hedi (河底镇), Dongsong (东宋镇), Xinghua (兴华镇), Madian (马店镇), Guxian (故县镇), Zhaocun (赵村镇), Changshui (长水镇), Jingyang (景阳镇)

Six townships:

- Chengjiao Township (城郊乡), Xiaojie Township (小界乡), Luoling Township (罗岭乡), Dizhang Township (底张乡), Chenwu Township (陈吴乡), Jiankou Township (涧口乡)

==== Dongsong ====
Villages:

- Dongsong (东宋村), Xi (西村), Zhangzhuang (丈庄村), Qijiagou (祁家沟村), Niuzhuang (牛庄村), Yaogou (么沟村), Zhou (周村), Jiayao (贾窑村), Dasong (大宋村), Xiaosong (小宋村), Fangli (方里村), Xiwu (西午村), Liuyu (流峪村), Ma (马村), Guo (郭村), Niefen (聂坟村), Baiyuan (柏原村), Yangshuwa (杨树洼村), Wangzhuang (王庄村), Guandong (官东村), Guanxi (官西村), Guannan (官南村), Dingzhai (丁寨村), Luowa (罗洼村), Shanzhuang (陕庄村), Xiahedi (下河堤村), Zhaiyan (宅延村), Zhonghedi (中河堤村), Beijiuxian (北旧县村), Shangsongyao (上宋窑村), Wangling (王岭村), Xiasongyao (下宋窑村), Shanghedi (上河堤村), Zhaoce (照册村), Hegou (河沟村), Miaoxia (庙下村), Nanjiuxian (南旧县村)

=== Mengjin County ===
Towns:

- Chengguan (城关镇), Huimeng (会盟镇), Pingle (平乐镇), Songzhuang (送庄镇), Baihe (白鹤镇), Chaoyang (朝阳镇), Xiaolangdi (小浪底镇), Matun (麻屯镇), Hengshui (横水镇), Changdai (常袋镇)

=== Ruyang County ===
Towns:

- Chengguan (城关镇), Shangdian (上店镇), Fudian (付店镇), Xiaodian (小店镇)

Townships:

- Baishu Township (柏树乡), Shibapan Township (十八盘乡), Jincun Township (靳村乡), Wangping Township (王坪乡), Santun Township (三屯乡), Liudian Township (刘店乡), Taoying Township (陶营乡), Neibu Township (内埠乡), Caidian Township (蔡店乡)

=== Song County ===
Towns:

- Chengguan (城关镇), Tianhu (田湖镇), Jiuxian (旧县镇), Checun (车村镇), Yanzhuang (闫庄镇), Deting (德亭镇), Dazhang (大章镇), Baihe (白河镇), Zhifang (纸房镇)

Townships:

- Daping Township (大坪乡), Kuqu Township (库区乡), Hecun Township (何村乡), Fanpo Township (饭坡乡), Jiudian Township (九店乡), Huangzhuang Township (黄庄乡), Muzhijie Township (木植街乡)

=== Xin'an County ===
Towns:

- Chengguan (城关镇), Shisi (石寺镇), Wutou (五头镇), Cijian (磁涧镇), Tiemen (铁门镇), Shijing (石井镇), Cangtou (仓头镇), Beiye (北冶镇), Zhengcun (正村镇), Nanlicun (南李村镇)

Townships:

- Caocun Township (曹村乡)

=== Yichuan County ===
Towns:

- Chengguan (城关镇), Minggao (鸣皋镇), Shuizhai (水寨镇), Pengpo (彭婆镇), Gaoshan (高山镇)

Townships:

- Yaling Township (鸦岭乡), Pingdeng Township (平等乡), Jiuhou Township (酒后乡), Gezhai Township (葛寨乡), Baiyuan Township (白元乡), Baisha Township (白沙乡), Banpo Township (半坡乡), Jiangzuo Township (江左乡), Lüdian Township (吕店乡)

=== Yiyang County ===
Towns:

- Chengguan (城关镇), Fengli (丰李镇), Liuquan (柳泉镇), Hancheng (韩城镇), Baiyang (白杨镇), Xuncun (寻村镇), Jinping (锦屏镇)

Townships:

- Yanzhen Township (盐镇乡), Gaocun Township (高村乡), Sanxiang Township (三乡乡), Zhangwu Township (张坞乡), Muce Township (穆册乡), Shangguan Township (上观乡), Lianzhuang Township (莲庄乡), Zhaobao Township (赵堡乡), Dongwangzhuang Township (董王庄乡), Xiangcun Township (樊村乡)

== Nanyang ==
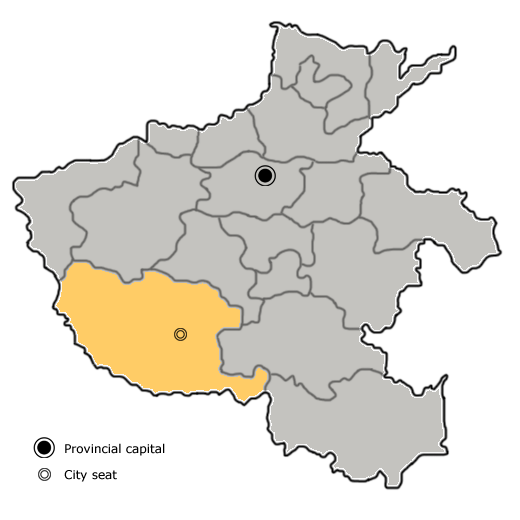
Location of Nanyang in the province

=== Wancheng District ===
Subdistricts:

- Dongguan Subdistrict (东关街道), Xinhua Subdistrict (新华街道), Hanye Subdistrict (汉冶街道), Zhongjing Subdistrict (仲景街道), Baihe Subdistrict (白河街道), Zaolin Subdistrict (枣林街道)

Towns:

- Guanzhuang (官庄镇), Wadian (瓦店镇), Hongniwan (红泥湾镇), Huangtaigang (黄台岗镇)

Townships:

- Lihe Township (溧河乡), Hanzhong Township (汉冢乡), Jinhua Township (金华乡), Cha'an Township (茶庵乡), Gaomiao Township (高庙乡), Xindian Township (新店乡)

=== Wolong District ===
Subdistricts:

- Qiyi Subdistrict (七一街道), Wolonggang Subdistrict (卧龙岗街道), Wuhou Subdistrict (武侯街道), Meixi Subdistrict (梅溪街道), Chezhan Subdistrict (车站街道), Guangwu Subdistrict (光武街道), Jingang Subdistrict (靳岗街道), Zhangheng Subdistrict (张衡街道), Bailixi Subdistrict (百里奚街道)

Towns:

- Shiqiao (石桥镇), Liaohe (潦河镇), Angao (安皋镇), Pushan (蒲山镇), Luying (陆营镇), Qinghua (青华镇), Yingzhuang (英庄镇)

Townships:

- Qiliyuan Township (七里园乡), Xiezhuang Township (谢庄乡), Wangcun Township (王村乡), Longxing Township (龙兴乡)

=== Dengzhou ===
Subdistricts:

- Huazhou Subdistrict (花洲街道), Gucheng Subdistrict (古城街道), Tuanhe Subdistrict (湍河街道)

Towns:

- Luozhuang (罗庄镇), Jitan (汲滩镇), Rangdong (穰东镇), Menglou (孟楼镇), Linba (林扒镇), Goulin (构林镇), Shilin (十林镇), Zhangcun (张村镇), Dusi (都司镇), Zhaoji (赵集镇), Liuji (刘集镇), Sangzhuang (桑庄镇), Pengqiao (彭桥镇)

Townships:

- Zhanglou Township (张楼乡), Bainiu Township (白牛乡), Xiaji Township (夏集乡), Peiying Township (裴营乡), Wenqu Township (文渠乡), Gaoji Township (高集乡), Taoying Township (陶营乡), Xiaoyangying Township (小杨营乡), Jiaodian Township (腰店乡), Longyan Township (龙堰乡), Jiulong Township (九龙乡)

=== Fangcheng County ===
Towns:

- Chengguan (城关镇), Dushu (独树镇), Bowang (博望镇), Guaihe (拐河镇), Xiaoshidian (小史店镇), Zhaohe (赵河镇), Guangyang (广阳镇)

Townships:

- Quanqiao Township (券桥乡), Yangji Township (杨集乡), Erlangmiao Township (二郎庙乡), Guzhuangdian Township (古庄店乡), Yanglou Township (杨楼乡), Qinghe Township (清河乡), Liuhe Township (柳河乡), Xilidian Township (四里店乡), Yuandian Hui Ethnic Township (袁店回族乡)

=== Nanzhao County ===
Towns:

- Chengguan (城关镇), Liushan (留山镇), Yunyang (云阳镇), Huangludian (皇路店镇), Nanhedian (南河店镇), Banshanping (板山坪镇), Qiaoduan (乔端镇), Baitugang (白土岗镇)

Townships:

- Chengjiao Township (城郊乡), Xiaodian Township (小店乡), Huanghou Township (皇后乡), Taishanmiao Township (太山庙乡), Shimen Township (石门乡), Sikeshu Township (四棵树乡), Mashiping Township (马市坪乡), Cuizhuang Township (崔庄乡)

=== Neixiang County ===
Towns:

- Chengguan (城关镇), Xiaguan (夏馆镇), Shigang (师岗镇), Mashankou (马山口镇), Tuandong (湍东镇), Chimei (赤眉镇), Wating (瓦亭镇), Wangdian (王店镇), Guanzhang (灌涨镇), Taoxi (桃溪镇)

Townships:

- Banchang Township (板场乡), Daqiao Township (大桥乡), Zhaodian Township (赵店乡), Qiliping Township (七里坪乡), Yuguan Township (余关乡), Zuopi Township (乍岖乡)

=== Sheqi County ===
Towns:

- Sheqi Town (社旗镇), Qiaotou (桥头镇), Raoliang (饶良镇), Xinglong (兴隆镇), Jinzhuang (晋庄镇), Lidian (李店镇), Miaodian (苗店镇), Haozhai (郝寨镇), Zhuji (朱集镇), Xiawa (下洼镇), Taihe (太和镇), Dafengying (大冯营镇)

Townships:

- Chengjiao Township (城郊乡), Mopi Township (陌陂乡), Tangzhuang Township (唐庄乡)

=== Tanghe County ===
Subdistricts:

- Binhe Subdistrict (滨河街道), Wenfeng Subdistrict | 文峰街道)

Towns:

- Yuantan (源潭镇), Zhangdian (张店镇), Guotan (郭滩镇), Huyang (湖阳镇), Heilong (黑龙镇), Dahetun (大河屯镇), Longtan (龙潭镇), Tongzhaipu (桐寨铺镇), Cangtai (苍台镇), Shangtun (上屯镇), Bidian (毕店镇), Shaobaisi (少拜寺镇)

Townships:

- Chengjiao Township (城郊乡), Tonghe Township (桐河乡), Zangang Township (昝岗乡), Qiyi Township (祁仪乡), Mazhenfu Township (马振抚乡), Gucheng Township (古城乡), Dongwangji Township (东王集乡)

=== Tongbai County ===
Towns:

- Chengguan (城关镇), Yuehe (月河镇), Wucheng (吴城镇), Guxian (固县镇), Maoji (毛集镇), Dahe (大河镇), Bujiang (埠江镇), Pingshi (平氏镇), Huaiyuan (淮源镇)

Townships:

- Chengjiao Township (城郊乡), Huilong Township (回龙乡), Huanggang Township (黄岗乡), Zhuzhuang Township (朱庄乡), Anpeng Township (安棚乡), Chengwan Township (程湾乡), Xinji Township (新集乡)

=== Xichuan County ===
Subdistricts:

- Longcheng Subdistrict (龙城街道), Shangsheng Subdistrict (商圣街道)

Towns:

- Jiuchong (九重镇), Xianghua (香花镇), Houpo (厚坡镇), Cangfang (仓房镇), Laocheng (老城镇), Madeng (马蹬镇), Shangji (上集镇), Jinhe (金河镇), Siwan (寺湾镇), Jingziguan (荆紫关镇), Shengwan (盛湾镇)

Townships:

- Maotang Township (毛堂乡), Xihuang Township (西簧乡), Taohe Township (滔河乡), Dashiqiao Township (大石桥乡)

=== Xinye County ===
Subdistricts:

- Hanhua Subdistrict (汉华街道), Hancheng Subdistrict (汉城街道)

Towns:

- Wangzhuang (王庄镇), Shayan (沙堰镇), Xindianpu (新甸铺镇), Wuxing (五星镇), Shi'an (施庵镇), Waizi (歪子镇), Lihepu (溧河铺镇), Wangji (王集镇)

Townships:

- Chengjiao Township (城郊乡), Qiangaomiao Township (前高庙乡), Fanji Township (樊集乡), Shangzhuang Township (上庄乡), Shanggang Township (上港乡)

=== Xixia County ===
Subdistricts:

- Baiyu Subdistrict (白羽街道), Zijin Subdistrict (紫金街道), Lianhua Subdistrict (莲花街道)

Towns:

- Danshui (丹水镇), Xiping (西坪镇), Shuanglong (双龙镇), Huiche (回车镇), Dinghe (丁河镇), Sangping (桑坪镇), Miping (米坪镇), Wuliqiao (五里桥镇), Taiping (太平镇), Chongyang (重阳镇)

Townships:

- Tianguan Township (田关乡), Yangcheng Township (阳城乡), Zhaigen Township (寨根乡), Shijiehe Township (石界河乡), Junmahe Township (军马河乡), Erlangping Township (二郎坪乡)

=== Zhenping County ===
Subdistricts:

- Nieyang Subdistrict (涅阳街道), Xuefeng Subdistrict (雪枫街道), Yudu Subdistrict (玉都街道)

Towns:

- Shifosi (石佛寺镇), Chaobei (晁陂镇), Jiasong (贾宋镇), Houji (侯集镇), Laozhuang (老庄镇), Luyi (卢医镇), Zheshan (遮山镇), Gaoqiu (高丘镇), Qutun (曲屯镇), Zaoyuan (枣园镇), Yangying (杨营镇)

Townships:

- Liuquanpu Township (柳泉铺乡), Erlong Township (二龙乡), Wanggang Township (王岗乡), Mazhuang Township (马庄乡), Zhanglin Township (张林乡), Anziying Township (安字营乡), Pengying Township (彭营乡), Guozhuang Hui Ethnic Township (郭庄回族乡)

== Pingdingshan ==
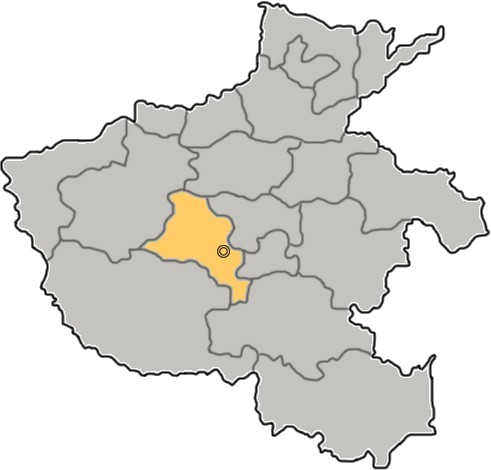
Location of Pingdingshan in the province

=== Shilong District ===
Subdistricts:

- Gaozhuang Subdistrict (高庄街道), Longxing Subdistrict (龙兴街道), Renmin Road Subdistrict (人民路街道), Longhe Subdistrict (龙河街道)

=== Weidong District ===
Subdistricts:

- Dong'an Road Subdistrict (东安路街道), Youyue Road Subdistrict (优越路街道), Wuyi Road Subdistrict (五一路街道), Jianshe Road Subdistrict (建设路街道), East Ring Road Subdistrict (东环路街道), Donggongrenzhen Subdistrict (东工人镇街道), Guanghua Road Subdistrict (光华路街道), Hongying Subdistrict (鸿鹰街道), Huangtai Subdistrict (皇台街道), North Ring Road Subdistrict (北环路街道), Donggaohuang Subdistrict (东高皇街道), Pucheng Subdistrict (蒲城街道)

=== Xinhua District ===
Subdistricts:

- Shuguang Avenue Subdistrict (曙光街街道), Guangming Road Subdistrict (光明路街道), Zhongxing Road Subdistrict (中兴路街道), Kuanggong Road Subdistrict (矿工路街道), Xishichang Subdistrict (西市场街道), Xinxinjie Subdistrict (新新街街道), Qingshishan Subdistrict (青石山街道), North Zhanhe Road Subdistrict (湛河北路街道), Hubin Road Subdistrict (湖滨路街道), Xigaohuang Subdistrict (西高皇街道)

Towns:

- Jiaodian (焦店镇), Zhiyang (滍阳镇)

=== Zhanhe District ===
Subdistricts:

- Mazhuang Subdistrict (马庄街道), South Ring Road Subdistrict (南环路街道), Yaomeng Subdistrict (姚孟街道), Jiulishan Subdistrict (九里山街道), Qinggong Road Subdistrict (轻工路街道), Gaoyang Road Subdistrict (高阳路街道)

The only town is Beidu (北渡镇) and the only township is Caozhen Township (曹镇乡)

=== Ruzhou ===
Subdistricts:

- Meishan Subdistrict (煤山街道), Fengxue Road Subdistrict (风穴路街道), Zhonglou Subdistrict (钟楼街道), Xi'erhe Subdistrict (洗耳河街道), Runan Subdistrict (汝南街道)

Towns:

- Jiliao (寄料镇), Wenquan (温泉镇), Linru (临汝镇), Xiaotun (小屯镇)

Townships:

- Yanglou Township (杨楼乡), Mangchuan Township (蟒川乡), Wangzhai Township (王寨乡), Lingtou Township (陵头乡), Miaoxia Township (庙下乡), Zhifang Township (纸坊乡), Shangzhuang Township (尚庄乡), Qiling Township (骑岭乡), Dayu Township (大峪乡), Xiadian Township (夏店乡), Jiaocun Township (焦村乡)

=== Wugang ===
Subdistricts:

- Yakou Subdistrict (垭口街道), Sipo Subdistrict (寺坡街道), Zhulan Subdistrict (朱兰街道), Yuanling Subdistrict (院岭街道), Kuangjian Subdistrict (矿建街道)

Towns:

- Shangdian (尚店镇), Batai (八台镇), Yinji (尹集镇)

Townships:

- Zaolin Township (枣林乡), Miaojie Township (庙街乡), Tieshan Township (铁山乡), Wugong Township (武功乡), Yangzhuang Township (杨庄乡)

=== Baofeng County ===
The only subdistrict is Tielu Subdistrict (铁路街道)

Towns:

- Chengguan (城关镇), Zhouzhuang (周庄镇), Naodian (闹店镇), Shiqiao (石桥镇), Shangjiuwu (商酒务镇), Daying (大营镇), Zhangbaqiao (张八桥镇), Yangzhuang (杨庄镇)

Townships:

- Xiaoqi Township (肖旗乡), Zhaozhuang Township (赵庄乡), Qianying Township (前营乡), Lizhuang Township (李庄乡)

=== Jia County ===
Towns:

- Chengguan (城关镇), Zhongjia (冢头镇), Anliang (安良镇), Tangjie (堂街镇), Xuedian (薛店镇), Changqiao (长桥镇)

Townships:

- Wangji Township (王集乡), Likou Township (李口乡), Ciba Township (茨芭乡), Guangkuotiandi Township (广阔天地乡), Huangdao Township (黄道乡), Baimiao Township (白庙乡), Zhayuan Township (渣园乡), Yaozhuang Hui Ethnic Township (姚庄回族乡)

=== Lushan County ===
Subdistricts:

- Lufeng Subdistrict (露峰街道), Qintai Subdistrict (琴台街道), Luyang Subdistrict (鲁阳街道), Huiyuan Subdistrict (汇源街道)

Towns:

- Xiatang (下汤镇), Liangwa (梁洼镇), Zhangguanying (张官营镇), Zhangliang (张良镇), Yaoshan (尧山镇)

Towns:

- Zhaocun Township (赵村乡), Sikeshu Township (四棵树乡), Tuancheng Township (团城乡), Xiongbei Township (熊背乡), Nanghe Township (瀼河乡), Wawu Township (瓦屋乡), Guanyinsi Township (观音寺乡), Zhaopingtaikuqu Township (昭平台库区乡), Beizi Township (背孜乡), Cangtou Township (仓头乡), Dongzhou Township (董周乡), Zhangdian Township (张店乡), Xinji Township (辛集乡), Gunziying Township (磙子营乡), Malou Township (马楼乡)

=== Ye County ===
Towns:

- Kunyang (昆阳镇), Rendian (任店镇), Bao'an (保安镇), Xiantai (仙台镇), Zunhuadian (遵化店镇)

Townships:

- Chengguan Township (城关乡), Xiali Township (夏李乡), Changcun Township (常村乡), Tianzhuang Township (田庄乡), Jiuxian Township (旧县乡), Xindian Township (辛店乡), Longquan Township (龙泉乡), Shuizhai Township (水寨乡), Liancun Township (廉村乡), Dengli Township (邓李乡), Gongdian Township (龚店乡), Hongzhuangyang Township (洪庄杨乡), Mazhuang Hui Ethnic Township (马庄回族乡)

== Puyang ==
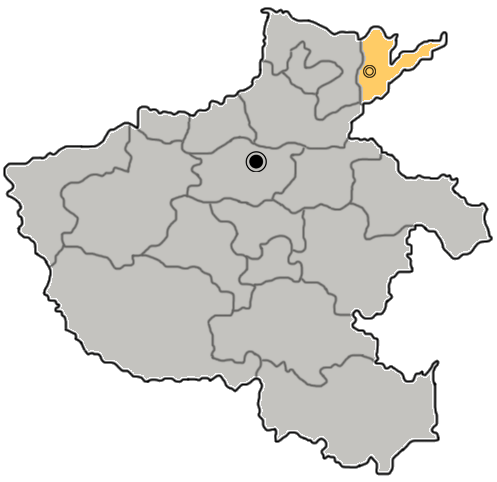
Location of Puyang in the province

=== Hualong District ===
Subdistricts:

- Zhongyuan Road Subdistrict (中原路街道), Shengli Road Subdistrict (利路街道), Jianshe Road Subdistrict (建设路街道), Renmin Road Subdistrict (人民路街道), Daqing Road Subdistrict (大庆路街道), Huanghe Road Subdistrict (黄河路街道), Renqiu Road Subdistrict (任丘路街道), Kunwu Road Subdistrict (昆吾路街道), Huangfu Road Subdistrict (皇甫路街道), Zhongyuan Oil Field Subdistrict (中原油田街道)

Townships:

- Yuecun Township (岳村乡), Mengke Township (孟轲乡), Hucun Township (胡村乡), Wangzhu Township (王助乡), Xindiao Township (新习乡)

Others:

- Puyang Development Zone (濮阳市开发区), Baitiaohe Farm (白条河农场)

=== Fan County ===
Towns:

- Chengguan (城关镇), Pucheng (濮城镇)

Townships:

- Xinzhuang Township (辛庄乡), Yangji Township (杨集乡), Chenzhuang Township (陈庄乡), Baiyege Township (白衣阁乡), Wanglou Township (王楼乡), Yancunpu Township (颜村铺乡), Longwangzhuang Township (龙王庄乡), Luji Township (陆集乡), Zhangzhuang Township (张庄乡), Gaomatou Township (高码头乡)

=== Nanle County ===
Towns:

- Chengguan (城关镇), Hanzhang (韩张镇), Yuancun (元村镇), Fukan (福堪镇)

Townships:

- Yangcun Township (杨村乡), Zhangguotun Township (张果屯乡), Qiankou Township (千口乡), Gujinlou Township (谷金楼乡), Xishao Township (西邵乡), Sizhuang Township (寺庄乡), Liangcun Township (梁村乡), Jindegu Township (近德固乡)

=== Puyang County ===
Towns:

- Chengguan (城关镇), Liutun (柳屯镇), Wenliu (文留镇), Qingzu (庆祖镇), Basongqiao (八公桥镇), Xuzhen (徐镇镇), Hubuzhai (户部寨镇), Luhe (鲁河镇)

Townships:

- Qinghetou Township (清河头乡), Liangzhuang Township (梁庄乡), Wangchenggu Township (王称固乡), Baigang Township (白堽乡), Liyuan Township (梨园乡), Wuxing Township (五星乡), Zi'an Township (子岸乡), Huzhuang Township (胡状乡), Langzhong Township (郎中乡), Haitong Township (海通乡), Qucun Township (渠村乡), Diaocheng Township (习城乡)

=== Qingfeng County ===
Towns:

- Chengguan (城关镇), Mazhuangqiao (马庄桥镇), Wawutou (瓦屋头镇), Xianzhuang (仙庄镇), Liuge (柳格镇)

Townships:

- Liuta Township (六塔乡), Gongying Township (巩营乡), Macun Township (马村乡), Gaobao Township (高堡乡), Gucheng Township (古城乡), Daliu Township (大流乡), Hancun Township (韩村乡), Datun Township (大屯乡), Gucheng Township (固城乡), Shuangmiao Township (双庙乡), Zhifang Township (纸房乡), Yangshao Township (阳邵乡)

=== Taiqian County ===
Towns:

- Chengguan (城关镇), Houmiao (侯庙镇)

Townships:

- Houfang Township (后方乡), Qingshuihe Township (清水河乡), Malou Township (马楼乡), Sunkou Township (孙口乡), Dayuchen Township (打渔陈乡), Jiahe Township (夹河乡), Wuba Township (吴坝乡)

== Sanmenxia ==
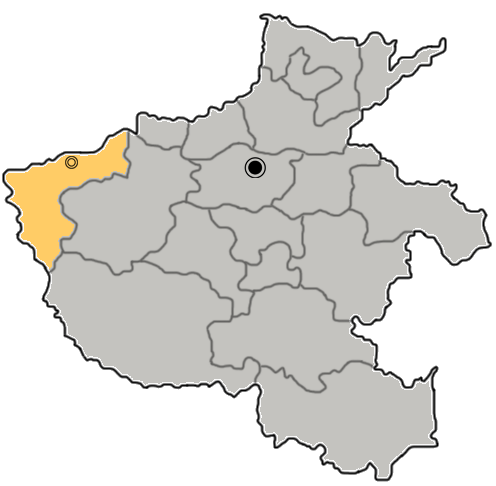
Location of Sanmenxia in the province

=== Hubin District ===
Subdistricts:

- Hubin Subdistrict (湖滨街道), Qianjin Subdistrict (前进街道), Chezhan Subdistrict (车站街道), Jianhe Subdistrict (涧河街道), Da'an Subdistrict (大安街道), Huixing Subdistrict (会兴街道), Yadi Subdistrict (崖底街道), Xiangyang Subdistrict (向阳街道)

Townships:

- Jiaokou Township (交口乡), Cizhong Township (磁钟乡), Gaomiao Township (高庙乡)

=== Yima ===
Subdistricts:

- Qianqiu Road Subdistrict (千秋路街道), Chaoyang Road Subdistrict (朝阳路街道), Xinyi Avenue Subdistrict (新义街街道), Changcun Road Subdistrict (常村路街道), Taishan Road Subdistrict (泰山路街道), Xinqu Subdistrict (新区街道), Dongqu Subdistrict (东区街道)

=== Lingbao ===
Towns:

- Chengguan (城关镇), Yinzhuang (尹庄镇), Zhuyang (朱阳镇), Yangping (阳平镇), Guxian (故县镇), Yuling (豫灵镇), Lingbao (大王镇), Yangdian (阳店镇), Hanguguan (函谷关镇), Jiaocun (焦村镇)

Townships:

- Chuankou Township (川口乡), Sihe Township (寺河乡), Sucun Township (苏村乡), Wumiao Township (五亩乡), Xiyan Township (西阎乡)

=== Lushi County ===
Towns:

- Chengguan (城关镇), Duguan (杜关镇), Wulichuan (五里川镇), Guandaokou (官道口镇), Zhuyangguan (朱阳关镇), Guanpo (官坡镇), Fanli (范里镇), Dongming (东明镇)

Townships:

- Wenyu Township (文峪乡), Hengjian Township (横涧乡), Mogoukou Township (磨沟口乡), Shuanghuaishu Township (双槐树乡), Tanghe Township (汤河乡), Wayaogou Township (瓦窑沟乡), Shiziping Township (狮子坪乡), Shahe Township (沙河乡), Xujiawan Township (徐家湾乡), Panhe Township (潘河乡), Mutong Township (木桐乡)

=== Mianchi County ===
Towns:

- Chengguan (城关镇), Yinghao (英豪镇), Zhangcun (张村镇), Hongyang (洪阳镇), Tianchi (天池镇)

Townships:

- Yangshao Township (仰韶乡), Rencun Township (仁村乡), Guoyuan Township (果园乡), Chencun Township (陈村乡), Potou Township (坡头乡), Duancun Township (段村乡), Nancun Township (南村乡)

=== Shan County ===
Towns:

- Daying (大营镇), Yuandian (原店镇), Xizhangcun (西张村镇), Guanyintang (观音堂镇)

Townships:

- Zhangbian Township (张汴乡), Zhangwan Township (张湾乡), Caiyuan Township (菜园乡), Zhangmao Township (张茅乡), Wangjiahou Township (王家后乡), Xiashi Township (硖石乡), Xilicun Township (西李村乡), Gongqian Township (宫前乡), Dianzi Township (店子乡)

== Shangqiu ==
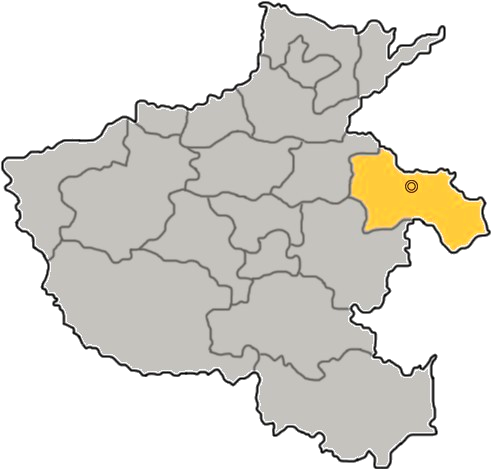
Location of Shangqiu in the province

=== Liangyuan District ===
Subdistricts:

- Qianjin Subdistrict (前进街道), Changzheng Subdistrict (长征街道), Baba Subdistrict (八八街道), Dongfeng Subdistrict (东风街道), Zhongzhou Subdistrict (中州街道), Baiyun Subdistrict (白云街道), Pingyuan Subdistrict (平原街道), Jianshe Subdistrict (建设街道), Pingtai Subdistrict (平台街道), Ping'an Subdistrict (平安街道)

Towns:

- Xieji (谢集镇), Shuangba (双八镇), Zhangge (张阁镇)

Townships:

- Zhouji Township (周集乡), Shuichipu Township (水池铺乡), Guantang Township (观堂乡), Wanglou Township (王楼乡), Lizhuang Township (李庄乡), Sunfuji Township (孙福集乡), Liukou Township (刘口乡)

=== Suiyang District ===
Subdistricts:

- Gucheng Subdistrict (古城街道), Wenhua Subdistrict (文化街道), Dongfang Subdistrict (东方街道), Xincheng Subdistrict (新城街道)

Towns:

- Songji (宋集镇), Guocun (郭村镇), Likou (李口镇), Gaoxin (高辛镇)

Townships:

- Gusong Township (古宋乡), Yanji Township (阎集乡), Fengqiao Township (冯桥乡), Wuqiang Township (坞墙乡), Baogongmiao Township (包公庙乡), Loudian Township (娄店乡), Maogudui Township (毛堌堆乡), Luhe Township (路河乡), Lema Township (勒马乡), Linhedian Township (临河店乡)

=== Yongcheng ===
Towns:

- Yanji (演集镇), Chengguan (城关镇), Mangshan (芒山镇), Gaozhuang (高庄镇), Zancheng (酂城镇), Peiqiao (裴桥镇), Maqiao (马桥镇), Xuehu (薛湖镇), Jiangkou (蒋口镇), Chenji (陈集镇), Shibali (十八里镇)

Township:

- Chengxiang Township (城厢乡), Houling Township (候岭乡), Huangkou Township (黄口乡), Xinqiao Township (新桥乡), Shuangqiao Township (双桥乡), Wangji Township (王集乡), Lizhai Township (李寨乡), Wolong Township (卧龙乡), Longgang Township (龙岗乡), Mamu Township (马牧乡), Zanyang Township (酂阳乡), Taiqiu Township (太丘乡), Shunhe Township (顺和乡), Tiaohe Township (条河乡), Liuhe Township (刘河乡), Chenguanzhuang Township (陈官庄乡), Miaoqiao Township (苗桥乡), Huicun Township (茴村乡)

=== Minquan County ===
Towns:

- Chengguan (城关镇), Renhe (人和镇), Longtang (龙塘镇), Beiguan (北关镇), Chengzhuang (程庄镇), Wangzhuangzhai (王庄寨镇)

Townships:

- Huayuan Township (花园乡), Yindian Township (尹店乡), Sunliu Township (孙六乡), Yegang Township (野岗乡), Shuangta Township (双塔乡), Linqi Township (林七乡), Chumiao Township (褚庙乡), Laoyanji Township (老颜集乡), Shunhe Township (顺河乡), Wangqiao Township (王桥乡), Bodang Hui Ethnic Township (伯党回族乡), Huji Hui Ethnic Township (胡集回族乡)

=== Ningling County ===
Towns:

- Chengguan (城关镇), Zhanggong (张弓镇), Liuhe (柳河镇), Luogang (逻岗镇), Shiqiao (石桥镇)

Townships:

- Huanggang Township (黄岗乡), Huabao Township (华堡乡), Liulou Township (刘楼乡), Chenglou Township (程楼乡), Qiaolou Township (乔楼乡), Chengjiao Township (城郊乡), Yangyi Township (阳驿乡), Kongji Township (孔集乡), Zhaocun Township (赵村乡)

=== Sui County ===
Towns:

- Zhoutang (周堂镇), Pinggang (平岗镇), Chaozhuang (潮庄镇), Changgang (长岗镇), Liaodi (蓼堤镇), Xilingsi (西陵寺镇), Shangtun (尚屯镇), Chengguan (城关镇)

Townships:

- Chengjiao Township (城郊乡), Youjitun Township (尤吉屯乡), Heji Township (河集乡), Hutang Township (胡堂乡), Baimiao Township (白庙乡), Houtai Township (后台乡), Dongdian Township (董店乡), Jiangang Township (涧岗乡), Kuangcheng Township (匡城乡), Bailou Township (白楼乡), Sunjuji Township (孙聚寨乡), Hedi Township (河堤乡)

=== Xiayi County ===
Towns:

- Chengguan (城关镇), Huiting (会亭镇), Matou (马头镇), Jiyang (济阳镇), Liji (李集镇), Chezhan (车站镇), Yangji (杨集镇), Handaokou (韩道口镇)

Townships:

- Caoji Township (曹集乡), Huqiao Township (胡桥乡), Qihe Township (歧河乡), Guodian Township (郭店乡), Yemiao Township (业庙乡), Zhongfeng Township (中峰乡), Luozhuang Township (罗庄乡), Sanggu Township (桑固乡), Heying Township (何营乡), Wangji Township (王集乡), Liudianji Township (刘店集乡), Luoji Township (骆集乡), Taiping Township (太平乡), Kongzhuang Township (孔庄乡), Huodian Township (火店乡), Beizhen Township (北镇乡)

=== Yucheng County ===
Towns:

- Chengguan (城关镇), Jiegou (界沟镇), Yingguo (营郭镇), Duji (杜集镇), Gushu (谷熟镇), Dayangji (大杨集镇), Jiazhai (贾寨镇), Limin (利民镇), Zhangji (张集镇), Shaogang (稍岗镇)

Townships:

- Huangzhong Township (黄冢乡), Shaji Township (沙集乡), Dianji Township (店集乡), Zhanji Township (站集乡), Wenji Township (闻集乡), Mangzhongqiao Township (芒种桥乡), Liudian Township (刘店乡), Dahou Township (大候乡), Chengjiao Township (城郊乡), Zhengji Township (郑集乡), Lilaojia Township (李老家乡), Zhenligu Township (镇里固乡), Guwangji Township (古王集乡), Liuji Township (刘集乡), Qiaoji Township (乔集乡), Tianmiao Township (田庙乡)

=== Zhecheng County ===
Towns:

- Chengguan (城关镇), Chenqingji (陈青集镇), Qitai (起台镇), Huxiang (胡襄镇), Cisheng (慈圣镇), Anping (安平镇), Yuanxiang (远襄镇)

Townships:

- Shaoyuan Township (邵元乡), Zhangqiao Township (张桥乡), Liangzhuang Township (梁庄乡), Hong'en Township (洪恩乡), Laowangji Township (老王集乡), Dawu Township (大仵乡), Maji Township (马集乡), Niucheng Township (牛城乡), Huiji Township (惠济乡), Bogang Township (伯岗乡), Gangwang Township (岗王乡), Shenqiao Township (申桥乡), Liyuan Township (李原乡), Huangji Township (皇集乡)

== Xinxiang ==
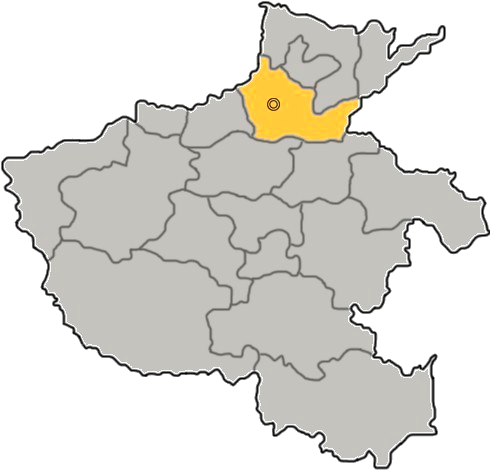
Location of Xinxiang in the province

=== Fengquan District ===
Subdistricts:

- Baoxi Subdistrict (宝西街道), Baodong Subdistrict (宝东街道)

The only town is Dakuai (大块镇)

Townships:

- Luwangfen Township (潞王坟乡), Genghuang Township (耿黄乡)

=== Hongqi District ===
Subdistricts:

- Xijie Subdistrict (西街街道), Dongjie Subdistrict (东街街道), Qudong Subdistrict (渠东街道), Nangandao Subdistrict (南干道街道), Xiangyangxiaoqu Subdistrict (向阳小区街道)

Towns:

- Hongmen (洪门镇), Xiaodian (小店镇)

The only township is Guandi Township (关堤乡)

=== Muye District ===
Subdistricts:

- Donggandao Subdistrict (东干道街道), Rongxiao Road Subdistrict (荣校路街道), Beigandao Subdistrict (北干道街道), Huayuan Subdistrict (花园街道), Weibei Subdistrict (卫北街道), Xinhui Road Subdistrict (新辉路街道), Heping Road Subdistrict (和平路街道)

The only town is Wangcun (王村镇) and the only township is Muye Township (牧野乡)

=== Weibin District ===
Subdistricts:

- Shengli Road Subdistrict (胜利路街道), Jiefang Road Subdistrict (解放路街道), Zhongtong Avenue Subdistrict (中同街街道), Jiankang Road Subdistrict (健康路街道), Ziyou Road Subdistrict (自由路街道), Nanqiao Subdistrict (南桥街道), Tiexi Subdistrict (铁西街道)

The only township is Pingyuan Township (平原乡)

=== Huixian ===
Subdistricts:

- Chengguan Subdistrict (城关街道), Huqiao Subdistrict (胡桥街道)

Towns:

- Baobi (薄壁镇), Yuhe (峪河镇), Baiquan (百泉镇), Mengzhuang (孟庄镇), Changcun (常村镇), Wucun (吴村镇), Nancun (南村镇), Nanzhai (南寨镇), Shangbali (上八里镇), Beiyunmen (北云门镇), Zhancheng (占城镇)

Townships:

- Huangshui Township (黄水乡), Gaozhuang Township (高庄乡), Zhangcun Township (张村乡), Hongzhou Township (洪洲乡), Xipingluo Township (西平罗乡), Paishitou Township (拍石头乡), Zhaogu Township (赵固乡), Shayao Township (沙窑乡), Jitun Township (冀屯乡)

=== Weihui ===
Towns:

- Jishui (汲水镇), Taigong (太公镇), Sunxingcun (孙杏村镇), Houhe (后河镇), Liyuantun (李源屯镇), Tangzhuang (唐庄镇), Shanglecun (上乐村镇)

Townships:

- Shibaotou Township (狮豹头乡), Andu Township (安都乡), Dunfangdian Township (顿坊店乡), Liuzhuang Township (柳庄乡), Pangzhai Township (庞寨乡), Chengjiao Township (城郊乡)

=== Changyuan County ===
Subdistricts:

- Puxi Subdistrict (蒲西街道), Pudong Subdistrict (蒲东街道), Nanpu Subdistrict (南蒲街道), Pubei Subdistrict (蒲北街道)

Towns:

- Dingluan (丁栾镇), Xiangxiang (樊相镇), Weizhuang (魏庄镇), Naoli (恼里镇), Changcun (常村镇), Zhaodi (赵堤镇), Menggang (孟岗镇), Mancun (满村镇)

Townships:

- Lugang Township (芦岗乡), Miaozhai Township (苗寨乡), Fangli Township (方里乡), Wuqiu Township (武邱乡), Shejia Township (佘家乡), Zhangsanzhai Township (张三寨乡)

=== Fengqiu County ===
Towns:

- Chengguan (城关镇), Huangling (黄陵镇), Huangde (黄德镇), Yingju (应举镇), Chenqiao (陈桥镇), Zhaogang (赵岗镇), Liuguang (留光镇), Pandian Township (潘店镇)

Townships:

- Chengguan Township (城关乡), Hui Township (回族乡), Wangcun Township (王村乡), Chengu Township (陈固乡), Juxiang Township (居厢乡), Lugang Township (鲁岗乡), Jinggong Township (荆宫乡), Caogang Township (曹岗乡), Lizhuang Township (李庄乡), Yingang Township (尹岗乡), Fengcun Township (冯村乡)

=== Huojia County ===
Towns:

- Chengguan (城关镇), Zhaojing (照镜镇), Huangdi (黄堤镇), Zhonghe (中和镇), Xuying (徐营镇), Fengzhuang (冯庄镇), Kangcun (亢村镇), Shizhuang (史庄镇), Taishan (太山镇)

Townships:

- Weizhuang Township (位庄乡), Daxinzhuang Township (大新庄乡)

Other:

- Xigong District Administrative Committee (西工区管理委员会)

=== Xinxiang County ===
Towns:

- Zhaipo (翟坡镇), Xiaoji (小冀镇), Qiliying (七里营镇), Langgongmiao (郎公庙镇), Guguzhai (古固寨镇), Dazhaoying (大召营镇)

The only township is Hehe Township (合河乡)

Others:

- Xinxiang Economic Development Zone (新乡经济开发区)

=== Yanjin County ===
Towns:

- Chengguan (城关镇), Dongtun (东屯镇), Fengzhuang (丰庄镇)

Townships:

- Senggu Township (僧固乡), Shipogu Township (石婆固乡), Weiqiu Township (魏邱乡), Sizhai Township (司寨乡), Wanglou Township (王楼乡), Mazhuang Township (马庄乡), Zuocheng Township (胙城乡), Yulin Township (榆林乡), Xiaotan Township (小潭乡)

=== Yuanyang County ===
Towns:

- Chengguan (城关镇), Yuanwu (原武镇), Shizhai (师寨镇)

Townships:

- Gebukou Township (葛埠口乡), Funingji Township (福宁集乡), Zhulou Township (祝楼乡), Qiaobei Township (桥北乡), Handongzhuang Township (韩董庄乡), Jiangzhuang Township (蒋庄乡), Guanchang Township (官厂乡), Dabin Township (大宾乡), Doumen Township (陡门乡), Qijie Township (齐街乡), Taipingzhen Township (太平镇乡), Luzhai Township (路寨乡), Yang'a Township (阳阿乡), Jintang Township (靳堂乡)

== Xinyang ==
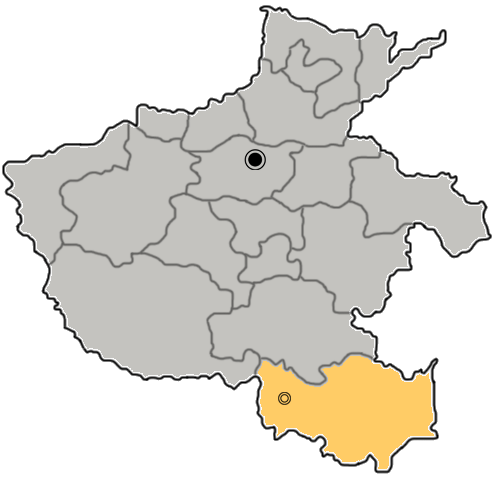
Location of Xinyang in the province

=== Pingqiao District ===
Subdistricts:

- Yangshan Subdistrict (羊山街道), Qianjin Subdistrict (前进街道), Nanjing Road Subdistrict (南京路街道), Pingqiao Subdistrict (平桥街道), Gan’an Subdistrict (甘岸街道), Wulidian Subdistrict (五里店街道)

Towns:

- Minggang (明港镇), Wuli (五里镇), Xingji (邢集镇), Pingchang (平昌镇), Yanghe (洋河镇)

Townships:

- Xiaowang Township (肖王乡), Longjing Township (龙井乡), Hudian Township (胡店乡), Pengjiawan Township (彭家湾乡), Changtai Township (长台乡), Xiaodian Township (肖店乡), Wanggang Township (王岗乡), Gaoliangdian Township (高粱店乡), Chashan Township (查山乡)

=== Shihe District ===
Subdistricts:

- Laocheng Subdistrict (老城街道), Minquan Subdistrict (民权街道), Chezhan Subdistrict (车站街道), Wulidun Subdistrict (五里墩街道), Wuxing Subdistrict (五星街道), Hudong Subdistrict (湖东街道), Nanwan Subdistrict (南湾街道), Jinniushan Subdistrict (金牛山街道), Shuangjing Subdistrict (双井街道)

Towns:

- Lijiazhai (李家寨镇), Wujiadian (吴家店镇), Dongshuanghe (东双河镇)

Townships:

- Youhe Township (游河乡), Dongjiahe Township (董家河乡), Shihegang Township (浉河港乡), Tanjiahe Township (谭家河乡), Liulin Township (柳林乡), Ersanliqiao Township (十三里桥乡)

=== Guangshan County ===
Subdistricts:

- Xianshan Subdistrict (弦山街道), Zishui Subdistrict (紫水街道)

Towns:

- Suntiepu (孙铁铺镇), Pobeihe (泼陂河镇), Baique (白雀镇), Shilimiao (十里庙镇), Mafan (马畈镇), Zhuanqiao (砖桥镇), Zhaihe (寨河镇)

Townships:

- Yanhe Township (晏河乡), Huaidian Township (槐店乡), Yinpeng Township (殷棚乡), Wenshu Township (文殊乡), Xianju Township (仙居乡), Beixiangdian Township (北向店乡), Nanxiangdian Township (南向店乡), Luochen Township (罗陈乡), Hushan Township (斛山乡), Liangting Township (凉亭乡)

=== Gushi County ===
Towns:

- Chengguan (城关镇), Sanhejian (三河尖镇), Chenlinzi (陈淋子镇), Liji (黎集镇), Wangliu (往流镇), Guolutan (郭陆滩镇), Jiangji (蒋集镇), Huzupu (胡族铺镇), Fangji (方集镇), Duanji (段集镇), Fenshuiting (分水亭镇)

Townships:

- Chengjiao Township (城郊乡), Wangpeng Township (汪棚乡), Shahepu Township (沙河铺乡), Nandaqiao Township (南大桥乡), Hongbu Township (洪埠乡), Chenji Township (陈集乡), Xuji Township (徐集乡), Fenggang Township (丰港乡), Magang Township (马堽乡), Caomiaoji Township (草庙集乡), Zhangguangmiao Township (张广庙乡), Shifodian Township (石佛店乡), Quanhepu Township (泉河铺乡), Liushudian Township (柳树店乡), Wumiaoji Township (武庙集乡), Zushimiao Township (祖师庙乡), Zhaogang Township (赵岗乡), Zhanglaobu Township (张老埠乡), Yangji Township (杨集乡), Lidian Township (李店乡)

=== Huaibin County ===
Towns:

- Chengguan (城关镇), Langan (栏杆镇), Fanghu (防胡镇), Xinli (新里镇), Maji (马集镇), Qisi (期思镇), Zhaoji (赵集镇)

Townships:

- Taitou Township (台头乡), Wangjiagang Township (王家岗乡), Gucheng Township (固城乡), Sankongqiao Township (三空桥乡), Zhangli Township (张里乡), Luji Township (芦集乡), Dengwan Township (邓湾乡), Zhangzhuang Township (张庄乡), Wangdian Township (王店乡), Gudui Township (谷堆乡)

=== Huangchuan County ===
Subdistricts:

- Chunshen Subdistrict (春申街道), Dingcheng Subdistrict (定城街道), Yiyang Subdistrict (弋阳街道), Laocheng Subdistrict (老城街道)

Towns:

- Shuangliushu (双柳树镇), Sanpisi (伞陂寺镇), Butaji (卜塔集镇), Renhe (仁和镇), Fudian (傅店镇), Xuezi (踅孜镇), Taolinpu (桃林铺镇), Huangsigang (黄寺岗镇), Jiangjiaji (江家集镇)

Townships:

- Chuanliudian Township (传流店乡), Weigang Township (魏岗乡), Zhangji Township (张集乡), Lailong Township (来龙乡), Longgu Township (隆古乡), Tandian Township (谈店乡), Shangyougang Township (上油岗乡), Baidian Township (白店乡)

=== Luoshan County ===
Towns:

- Chengguan (城关镇), Zhoudang (周党镇), Nangan (楠杆镇), Zhugan (竹竿镇), Qingshan (青山镇), Zilu (子路镇), Lingshan (灵山镇), Pengxin (彭新镇), Panxin (潘新镇)

Townships:

- Longshan Township (龙山乡), Gaodian Township (高店乡), Youdian Township (尤店乡), Dongpu Township (东铺乡), Mangzhang Township (莽张乡), Miaoxian Township (庙仙乡), Zhutang Township (朱堂乡), Tiepu Township (铁铺乡), Shandian Township (山店乡), Dingyuan Township (定远乡)

=== Shangcheng County ===
Towns:

- Chengguan (城关镇), Shangshiqiao (上石桥镇), Shuangchunpu (双椿铺镇), Wangqiao (汪桥镇), Yuji (余集镇), Yangang (鄢岗镇), Daquandian (达权店镇), Fengji (丰集镇)

Townships:

- Jingangtai Township (金刚台乡), Fengdian Township (冯店乡), Liji Township (李集乡), Nianyushan Township (鲇鱼山乡), Suxianshi Township (苏仙石乡), Wanggang Township (汪岗乡), Wuhe Township (吴河乡), Changzhuyuan Township (长竹园乡), Hefengqiao Township (河凤桥乡), Guanmiao Township (观庙乡), Fushan Township (伏山乡)

=== Xi County ===
Towns:

- Chengguan (城关镇), Baoxin (包信镇), Xiazhuang (夏庄镇), Dongyue (东岳镇), Xiaohuidian (小茴店镇), Xiangdian (项店镇)

Townships:

- Chengjiao Township (城郊乡), Sunmiao Township (孙庙乡), Lukou Township (路口乡), Zhangtao Township (张陶乡), Pengdian Township (彭店乡), Yangdian Township (杨店乡), Baitudian Township (白土店乡), Gangjidian Township (岗李店乡), Changling Township (长陵乡), Chenpeng Township (陈棚乡), Linhe Township (临河乡), Guandian Township (关店乡), Caohuanglin Township (曹黄林乡), Balicha Township (八里岔乡)

=== Xin County ===
Towns:

- Xinji (新集镇), Shawo (沙窝镇), Balifan (八里畈镇), Wuchenhe (吴陈河镇), Suhe (苏河镇)

Townships:

- Zhouhe Township (周河乡), Huwan Township (浒湾乡), Qianjin Township (千斤乡), Chendian Township (陈店乡), Kafang Township (卡房乡), Guojiahe Township (郭家河乡), Jianchanghe Township (箭厂河乡), Sidian Township (泗店乡), Doushanhe Township (陡山河乡), Tianpu Township (田铺乡)

== Xuchang ==
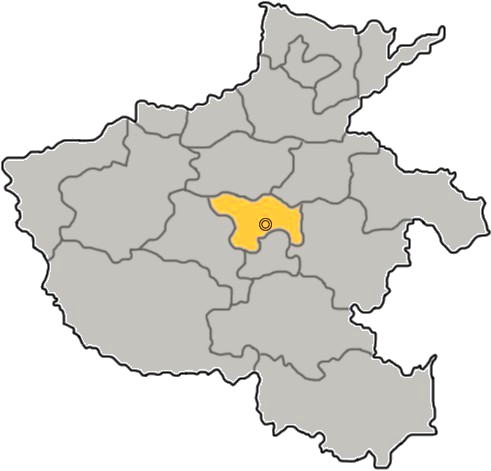
Location of Xuchang in the province

=== Weidu District ===
Subdistricts:

- Xidajie Subdistrict (西大街街道), Dongdajie Subdistrict (东大街街道), Xiguan Subdistrict (西关街道), Nanguan Subdistrict (南关街道), Beidajie Subdistrict (北大街街道), Wuyi Road Subdistrict (五一路街道), Gaoqiaoying Subdistrict (高桥营街道), Dingzhuang Subdistrict (丁庄街道), Bandaihe Subdistrict (半截河街道), Qilidian Subdistrict (七里店街道), Wenfeng Subdistrict (文峰街道), Xinxing Subdistrict (新兴街道)

=== Changge ===
Subdistricts:

- Jianshe Road Subdistrict (建设路街道), Changxing Road Subdistrict (长兴路街道), Changshe Road Subdistrict (长社路街道), Jinqiao Road Subdistrict (金桥路街道)

Towns:

- Heshangqiao (和尚桥镇), Pohu (坡胡镇), Houhe (后河镇), Shigu (石固镇), Laocheng (老城镇), Nanxi (南席镇), Dazhou (大周镇), Dongcun (董村镇)

Townships:

- Zengfumiao Township (增福庙乡), Guanting Township (官亭乡), Shixiang Township (石象乡), Guqiao Township (古桥乡)

=== Yuzhou ===
Subdistricts:

- Yingchuan Subdistrict (颍川街道), Xiadu Subdistrict (夏都街道), Hancheng Subdistrict (韩城街道), Juntai Subdistrict (钧台街道)

Towns:

- Huolong (火龙镇), Shundian (顺店镇), Fangshan (方山镇), Shenhou (神垕镇), Hongchang (鸿畅镇), Liangbei (梁北镇), Gucheng (古城镇), Wuliang (无梁镇), Wenshu (文殊镇)

Townships:

- Zhuge Township (朱阁乡), Changzhuang Township (苌庄乡), Huashi Township (花石乡), Jiushan Township (鸠山乡), Mojie Township (磨街乡), Zhangde Township (张得乡), Xiaolü Township (小吕乡), Fanpo Township (范坡乡), Chuhe Township (褚河乡), Guolian Township (郭连乡), Qianjing Township (浅井乡), Fanggang Township (方岗乡), Shanhuo Hui Ethnic Township (山货回族乡)

=== Xiangcheng County ===
Towns:

- Chengguan (城关镇), Yingqiao Hui Town (颍桥回族镇), Mailing (麦岭镇), Yingyang (颍阳镇), Wangluo (王洛镇), Ziyun (紫云镇, 原名孙祠堂乡), Kuzhuang (库庄镇)

Townships:

- Zhanbei Township (湛北乡), Shantoudian Township (山头店乡), Cigou Township (茨沟乡), Dingying Township (丁营乡), Jiangzhuang Township (姜庄乡), Fanhu Township (范湖乡), Shuangmiao Township (双庙乡), Fenchen Township (汾陈乡), Shilipu Township (十里铺乡)

=== Xuchang County ===
Towns:

- Jiangguanchi (将官池镇), Wunüdian (五女店镇), Shangji (尚集镇), Suqiao (苏桥镇), Jiangliji (蒋李集镇), Zhangpan (张潘镇), Lingjing (灵井镇)

Townships:

- Chencao Township (陈曹乡), Dengzhuang Township (邓庄乡), Xiaozhao Township (小召乡), Hejie Township (河街乡), Guicun Township (桂村乡), Zhenjian Township (椹涧乡), Yulin Township (榆林乡), Changcunzhang Township (长村张乡), Aizhuang Hui Ethnic Township (艾庄回族乡)

=== Yanling County ===
Towns:

- Anling (安陵镇), Malan (马栏镇), Bailiang (柏梁镇), Chenhuadian (陈化店镇), Wangtian (望田镇), Zhangqiao (张桥鎮), Nanwu (南坞鎮), Taocheng (陶城鎮), Zhile (只乐鎮), Dama (大马鎮), Pengdian (彭店鎮), Mafang (马坊鎮)

== Zhoukou ==
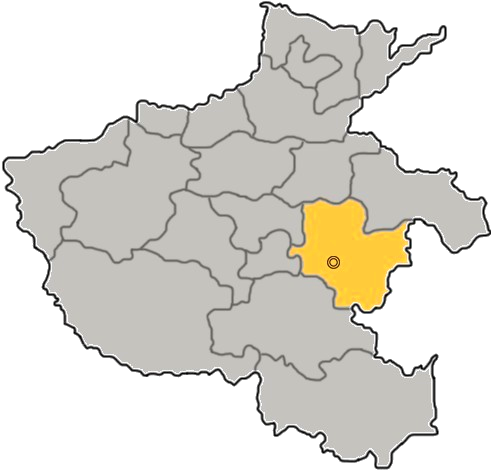
Location of Zhoukou in the province

=== Chuanhui District ===
Subdistricts:

- Chenzhou Subdistrict (陈州街道), Qiyi Subdistrict (七一路街道), Fangzhi Road Subdistrict (纺织路街道), Renhe Subdistrict (人和街道), Xiaoqiao Subdistrict (小桥街道), Chengnan Subdistrict (城南街道), Chengbei Subdistrict (城北街道), Chengdong Subdistrict (城东街道), Bankou Subdistrict (搬口街道)

The only township is Libukou Township (李埠口乡)

=== Xiangcheng City ===
Subdistricts:

- Huayuan Subdistrict (花园街道), Shuizhai Subdistrict (水寨街道), Dongfang Subdistrict (东方街道), Lianhua Subdistrict (莲花街道), Guangwu Subdistrict (光武街道), Qianfoge Subdistrict (千佛阁街道)

Towns:

- Nandun (南顿镇), Sundian (孙店镇), Lizhai (李寨镇), Jialing (贾岭镇), Gaosi (高寺镇), Xinqiao (新桥镇), Fuji (付集镇), Guanhui (官会镇), Dingji (丁集镇), Zhengguo (郑郭镇), Moling (秣陵镇), Wangmingkou (王明口镇)

Townships:

- Yongfeng Township (永丰乡), Fanji Township (范集乡), Sanzhang Township (三张店乡)

=== Dancheng County ===
Towns:

- Chengguan (城关镇), Wutai (吴台镇), Nanfeng (南丰镇), Baima (白马镇), Ningping (宁平镇), Yilu (宜路镇), Qiandian (钱店镇), Jizhong (汲冢镇), Shicao (石槽镇)

Townships:

- Chengjiao Township (城郊乡), Hutougang Township (虎头岗乡), Jishui Township (汲水乡), Zhangwanji Township (张完集乡), Dingcun Township (丁村乡), Shuanglou Township (双楼乡), Qiuqu Township (秋渠乡), Dongfeng Township (东风乡), Baji Township (巴集乡), Lilou Township (李楼乡), Huji Township (胡集乡)

=== Fugou County ===
Towns:

- Chengguan (城关镇), Cuiqiao (崔桥镇), Jiangcun (江村镇), Baitan (白潭镇), Jiuyuan (韭园镇), Liansi (练寺镇), Daxin (大新镇), Baotun (包屯镇), Biangang (汴岗镇)

Townships:

- Caoli Township (曹里乡), Chaigang Township (柴岗乡), Gucheng Township (固城乡), Lütan Township (吕潭乡), Dalizhuang Township (大李庄乡), Chengjiao Township (城郊乡)

=== Huaiyang County ===
Towns:

- Chengguan (城关镇), Xinzhan (新站镇), Lutai (鲁台镇), Sitong (四通镇), Lincai (临蔡镇), Anling (安岭镇)

Townships:

- Zhuji Township (朱集乡), Doumen Township (豆门乡), Fengtang Township (冯塘乡), Liuzhentun Township (刘振屯乡), Wangdian Township (王店乡), Dalian Township (大连乡), Gedian Township (葛店乡), Huangji Township (黄集乡), Bailou Township (白楼乡), Qilao Township (齐老乡), Zhengji Township (郑集乡), Caohe Township (曹河乡), Xuwan Township (许湾乡)

=== Luyi County ===
Towns:

- Chengguan (城关镇), Xuanwu (玄武镇), Zaoji (枣集镇), Taiqinggong (太清宫镇), Wangpiliu (王皮溜镇), Shiliang (试量镇), Xinji (辛集镇), Mapu (马铺镇), Wobei (涡北镇)

Townships:

- Luyi Township (城郊乡), Zhengjiaji Township (郑家集乡), Guantang Township (观堂乡), Shengtiezhong Township (生铁冢乡), Zhangdian Township (张店乡), Zhaocun Township (赵村乡), Renji Township (任集乡), Tangji Township (唐集乡), Gaoji Township (高集乡), Qiuji Township (邱集乡), Mudian Township (穆店乡), Yanghukou Township (杨湖口乡), Jiatan Township (贾滩乡)

Others:

- Taiqing Farm (太清农场), Huowang Farm (火王农场), Qianli Farm (前李农场), Zaoji Farm (枣集农场), Houdilou Farm (后狄楼农场)

=== Shangshui County ===
Subdistricts:

- Xinchengqu Subdistrict (新城区街道), Dongchengqu Subdistrict (东城区街道), Laocheng Subdistrict (老城街道)

Towns:

- Huangzhai (黄寨镇), Lianji (练集镇), Weiji (魏集镇), Guqiang (固墙镇), Baisi (白寺镇), Bacun (巴村镇), Tanzhuang (谭庄镇), Dengcheng (邓城镇), Huji (胡吉镇)

Townships:

- Chengguan Township (城关乡), Pingdian Township (平店乡), Yuanlao Township (袁老乡), Huahe Township (化河乡), Yaoji Township (姚集乡), Shuzhuang Township (舒庄乡), Dawu Township (大武乡), Zhangming Township (张明乡), Haogang Township (郝岗乡), Zhangzhuang Township (张庄乡), Tangzhuang Township (汤庄乡)

Other:

- Shangshui County Farm (商水县农场)

=== Shenqiu County ===
Subdistricts:

- Dongcheng Subdistrict (东城街道), Beicheng Subdistrict (北城街道)

Towns:

- Liuzhuangdian (刘庄店镇), Liufuji (留福集镇), Laocheng (老城镇), Zhaodeying (赵德营镇), Fujing (付井镇), Zhidian (纸店镇), Xin’anji (新安集镇), Baiji (白集镇), Liuwan (刘湾镇), Huaidian Hui Town (槐店回族镇)

Townships:

- Lianchi Township (连池乡), Shicaoji Township (石槽集乡), Fanying Township (范营乡), Lilaozhuang Township (李老庄乡), Daqiuzhuang Township (大邢庄乡), Fengying Township (冯营乡), Zhouying Township (周营乡), Hongshan Township (洪山乡), Beiyangji Township (北杨集乡), Bianlukou Township (卞路口乡)

=== Taikang County ===
Towns:

- Chengguan (城关镇), Changying (常营镇), Sunmukou (逊母口镇), Laozhong (老冢镇), Zhukou (朱口镇), Matou (马头镇), Longqu (龙曲镇), Banqiao (板桥镇), Fucaolou (符草楼镇), Machang (马厂镇), Maozhuang (毛庄镇)

Townships:

- Chengjiao Township (城郊乡), Yangmiao Township (杨庙乡), Wangji Township (王集乡), Gaoxian Township (高贤乡), Zhimawa Township (芝麻洼乡), Qingji Township (清集乡), Dutang Township (独塘乡), Daxuzhai Township (大许寨乡), Wulikou Township (五里口乡), Zhangji Township (张集乡), Gaolang Township (高朗乡), Zhuanlou Township (转楼乡)

=== Xihua County ===
Towns:

- Chengguan (城关镇), Xixiating (西夏亭镇), Xiaoyao (逍遥镇), Fengmu (奉母镇), Honghuaji (红花集镇), Niedui (聂堆镇), Dongxiating (东夏亭镇), Xihuaying (西华营镇), Zhifang (址坊镇)

Townships:

- Tiankou Township (田口乡), Qingheyi Township (清河驿乡), Piying Township (皮营乡), Dongwangying Township (东王营乡), Dawangzhuang Township (大王庄乡), Lidazhuang Township (李大庄乡), Yebukou Township (叶埠口乡), Chiying Township (迟营乡), Huangtuqiao Township (黄土桥乡), Aigang Township (艾岗乡)

== Zhumadian ==
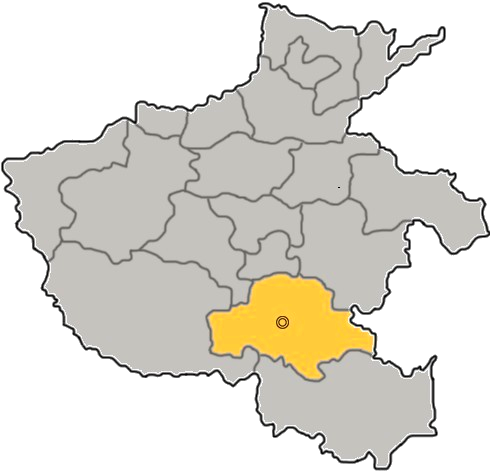
Location of Zhumadian in the province

=== Yicheng District ===
Subdistricts:

- Renmin Subdistrict (人民街道), Dongfeng Subdistrict (东风街道), Xiyuan Subdistrict (西园街道), Xinhua Subdistrict (新华街道), Nanhai Subdistrict (南海街道), Laojie Subdistrict (老街街道), Xianglin Subdistrict (橡林街道), Xuesong Subdistrict (雪松街道), Shunhe Subdistrict (顺河街道), Liuge Subdistrict (刘阁街道)

The only town is Shuitun (水屯镇)

Townships:

- Zhushi Township (诸市乡), Zhugudong Township (朱古洞乡), Humiao Township (胡庙乡), Gucheng Township (古城乡), Guanwangmiao Township (关王庙乡)

Others:

- Jinhe Office (金河办事处), Jinqiao Office (金桥办事处), Jinshan Office (金山办事处)

=== Biyang County ===
Towns:

- Bishui (泌水镇), Shahedian (沙河店镇), Yangpeng (羊册镇), Magutian (马谷田镇), Banqiao (板桥镇), Chunshui (春水镇)

Townships:

- Gaodian Township (高店乡), Chenzhuang Township (陈庄乡), Gaoyi Township (高邑乡), Wangdian Township (王店乡), Tongshan Township (铜山乡), Laohe Township (老河乡), Xiabeisi Township (下碑寺乡), Xianghe Township (象河乡), Fuzhuang Township (付庄乡), Jialou Township (贾楼乡), Huangshankou Township (黄山口乡), Guoji Township (郭集镇), Taishanmiao Township (泰山庙乡), Guanzhuang Township (官庄乡), Yangjiaji Township (杨家集乡), Shuangmiaojie Township (双庙街乡), Shewan Township (赊湾乡), Huayuan Township (花园乡)

=== Pingyu County ===
Towns:

- Guhuai (古槐镇), Yangbu (杨埠镇), Donghedian (东和店镇), Miaowan (庙湾镇), Sheqiao (射桥镇), Xiyangdian (西洋店镇)

Townships:

- Donghuangmiao Township (东皇庙乡), Gaoyangdian Township (高杨店乡), Shizilu Township (十字路乡), Houliu Township (后刘乡), Wanzhong Township (万冢乡), Yuhuangmiao Township (玉皇庙乡), Guolou Township (郭楼乡), Litun Township (李屯乡), Laowanggang Township (老王岗乡), Xindian Township (辛店乡), Wanjindian Township (万金店乡), Shuangmiao Township (双庙乡)

=== Queshan County ===
Towns:

- Panlong (盘龙镇), Zhugou (竹沟镇), Rendian (任店镇), Xin’andian (新安店镇), Liuzhuang (留庄镇), Liudian (刘店镇), Yifeng (蚁蜂镇)

Townships:

- Sanlihe Township (三里河乡), Shigunhe Township (石滚河乡), Wagang Township (瓦岗乡), Lixindian Township (李新店乡), Shuanghe Township (双河乡), Jinhuisi Township (普会寺乡)

=== Runan County ===
Towns:

- Runing (汝宁镇), Wanggang (王岗镇), Liangzhu (梁祝镇), Hexiao (和孝镇), Laojunmiao (老君庙镇), Liupen (留盆镇), Jinpu (金铺镇)

Townships:

- Sanmenzha Township (三门闸乡), Sanlidian Township (三里店乡), Sanqiao Township (三桥乡), Nanyudian Township (南余店乡), Changxing Township (常兴乡), Guanzhuan Township (官庄乡), Hanzhuang Township (韩庄乡), Luodian Township (罗店乡), Zhanglou Township (张楼乡), Bandian Township (板店乡)

=== Shangcai County ===
Towns:

- Caidu (蔡都镇), Huangbu (黄埠镇), Yangji (杨集镇), Zhuhu (洙湖镇), Dangdian (党店镇), Zhuli (朱里镇), Huapi (华陂镇)

Townships:

- Lugang Township (芦岗乡), Daluli Township (大路李乡), Wuliangsi Township (无量寺乡), Shaodian Township (邵店乡), Wulong Township (五龙乡), Yangtun Township (杨屯乡), Hedian Township (和店乡), Caigou Township (蔡沟乡), Taqiao Township (塔桥乡), Qihai Township (齐海乡), Chongli Township (崇礼乡), Hanzhai Township (韩寨乡), Dong’an Township (东岸乡), Donghong Township (东洪乡), Xiaoyuesi Township (小岳寺乡), Xihong Township (西洪乡), Baijin Township (百尺乡)

=== Suiping County ===
Towns:

- Quyang (瞿阳镇), Chezhan (车站镇), Yushan (玉山镇)

Townships:

- Changzhuang Township (常庄乡), Hexing Township (和兴乡), Shenzhai Township (沈寨乡), Huaishu Township (槐树乡), Chayashan Township (嵖岈山乡), Yangfeng Township (阳丰乡), Huazhuang Township (花庄乡), Wencheng Township (文城乡), Zhutang Township (褚堂乡), Shizhaipu Township (石寨铺乡)

Others:

- Chayashanxiang Scenic Area (嵖岈山乡风景区), Fengminggu Scenic Area (凤鸣谷风景区)

=== Xincai County ===
Towns:

- Gulü (古吕镇), Zhuandian (砖店镇), Chendian (陈店镇), Fogesi (佛阁寺镇), Liancun (练村镇), Changcun (棠村镇), Hanji (韩集镇), Longkou (龙口镇), Huanglou (黄楼镇), Sunzhao (孙召镇), Liqiao Hui Town (李桥回族镇)

Townships:

- Shilipu Township (十里铺乡), Yudian Township (余店乡), Hewu Township (河坞乡), Guanjin Township (关津乡), Songgang Township (宋岗乡), Dungang Township (顿岗乡), Jiantou Township (涧头乡), Yangzhuanghu Township (杨庄户乡), Huazhuang Township (化庄乡), Licheng Township (栎城乡), Mituosi Township (弥陀寺乡)

=== Xiping County ===
Subdistricts:

- Baicheng Subdistrict (柏城街道), Baiting Subdistrict (柏亭街道)

Towns:

- Wugouying (五沟营镇), Quanzhai (权寨镇), Shiling (师灵镇), Chushan (出山镇)

Townships:

- Huancheng Township (环城乡), Chongqu Township (重渠乡), Chayao Township (盆尧乡), Renhe Township (人和乡), Songji Township (宋集乡), Tandian Township (谭店乡), Lüdian Township (吕店乡), Lumiao Township (芦庙乡), Yangzhuang Township (杨庄乡), Zhuantan Township (专探乡), Erlang Township (二郎乡), Jiaozhuang Township (焦庄乡), Caizhai Hui Ethnic Township (蔡寨回族乡)

Other:

- Laowangpo Farm (老王坡农场)

=== Zhengyang County ===
Towns:

- Zhenyang (真阳镇), Handong (寒冻镇), Runanbu (汝南埠镇), Tongzhong (铜钟镇), Dougou (陡沟镇), Xiongzhai (熊寨镇)

Townships:

- Shenshui Township (慎水乡), Fuzhai Township (傅寨乡), Yuanzhai Township (袁寨乡), Xinruandian Township (新阮店乡), Youfangdian Township (油坊店乡), Leizhai Township (雷寨乡), Wangwuqiao Township (王勿桥乡), Yongxing Township (永兴乡), Lühe Township (吕河乡), Dalin Township (大林乡), Pidian Township (皮店乡), Pengqiao Township (彭桥乡), Lanqing Township (兰青乡)

Other:

- Wusan Farm (五三农场)
