= Yulin =

Yulin may refer to the following places in China:

== Cities and prefectures ==
- Yulin, Guangxi (玉林市), a prefecture-level city in Guangxi
- Yulin, Shaanxi (榆林市), a prefecture-level city in Shaanxi
- Yulin Prefecture (鬱林州), a prefecture between the 7th and 20th centuries in modern Guangxi

== Subdistricts ==
- Yulin Subdistrict, Fushun (榆林街道), in Xinfu District, Fushun, Liaoning
- Yulin Subdistrict, Chengdu (玉林街道), in Wuhou District, Chengdu, Sichuan
- Yulin Subdistrict, Xinchang County (羽林街道), in Xinchang County, Zhejiang

== Towns ==
- Yulin, Lanxi County (榆林镇), in Lanxi County, Heilongjiang
- Yulin, Inner Mongolia (榆林镇), in Saihan District, Hohhot, Inner Mongolia
- Yulin, Jilin (榆林镇), in Ji'an, Jilin
- Yulin, Sichuan (玉林镇), in Santai County, Sichuan

== Townships ==
- Yulin Township, Chongqing (鱼鳞乡), in Wuxi County, Chongqing
- Yulin Township, Gansu (榆林乡), in Linxia County, Gansu
- Yulin Township, Heilongjiang (育林乡), in Mingshui County, Heilongjiang
- Yulin Township, Xuchang (榆林乡), in Xuchang, Henan
- Yulin Township, Xinxiang (榆林乡), in Yanjin County, Henan

== Other ==
- Yulin Caves
- Yulin Naval Base (榆林海军基地)
- Harris Yulin (1937–2025), American actor
