= Shuangmiao =

Shuāngmiào (双庙) could refer to the following locations in China:

== Towns ==
- Shuangmiao, Anhui, in Taihe County
- Shuangmiao, Inner Mongolia, in Hanggin Rear Banner
- Shuangmiao, Shandong, in Xiajin County

== Townships ==
- Shuangmiao Township, Pingyu County, Henan
- Shuangmiao Township, Qingfeng County, Henan
- Shuangmiao Township, Xuchang, in Xiangcheng County, Henan
- Shuangmiao Township, Liaoning, in Zhangwu County
- Shuangmiao Township, Sichuan, in Da County
- Shuangmiao Township, Zhejiang, in Xianju County
