= Renmin Road Subdistrict =

Renmin Road Subdistrict or Renminlu Subdistrict may refer to these subdistricts in China:

- Renmin Road Subdistrict, Anqing, Anhui
- Renmin Road Subdistrict, Baiyin, Gansu
- Renmin Road Subdistrict, Haikou, Hainan
- Renmin Road Subdistrict, Handan, Hebei
- Renmin Road Subdistrict, Pingdingshan, Henan
- Renmin Road Subdistrict, Puyang, Henan
- Renmin Road Subdistrict, Zhengzhou, Henan
- Renmin Road Subdistrict, Chenzhou, Hunan
- Renmin Road Subdistrict, Hohhot, Inner Mongolia
- Renmin Road Subdistrict, Jiujiang, Jiangxi
- Renmin Road Subdistrict, Dalian, Liaoning
- Renmin Road Subdistrict, Shizuishan, Ningxia
- Renmin Road Subdistrict, Xianyang, Shaanxi
- Renmin Road Subdistrict, Wujiaqu, Xinjiang

== See also ==
- Renmin Street Subdistrict (disambiguation)
- Renmin Subdistrict (disambiguation)
