= Renmin =

Renmin (Chinese: 人民; lit. 'people'; unless otherwise noted) may refer to:

- Renmin University of China
- People's Daily, daily newspaper of the People's Republic of China
- Renmin, Heilongjiang (任民镇), town in Anda, Heilongjiang, China

== Subdistricts in China ==
- Renmin Subdistrict, Guangzhou, Guangdong
- Renmin Subdistrict, Hengyang, Hunan
- Renmin Subdistrict, Weinan, Shaanxi

== See also ==
- Renmin Road Subdistrict (disambiguation)
- Renmin Street Subdistrict (disambiguation)
- Renminbi, Chinese currency
- People (disambiguation)
