= Zhangcun =

Zhangcun may refer to the following locations in China:

== Towns ==
- Zhangcun, Yushan County (樟村镇), Jiangxi
- Zhangcun, Anji County (章村镇), Zhejiang

Written as "张村镇":

- Zhangcun, Anhui, in Lixin County
- Zhangcun, Dengzhou, Henan
- Zhangcun, Mianchi County, Henan
- Zhangcun, Shandong, in Huancui District, Weihai
- Zhangcun, Pinglu County, Shanxi

== Townships ==
- Zhangcun Township, Qingtian County (章村乡), Zhejiang

Written as "张村乡"

- Zhangcun Township, Hebei, in Xian County
- Zhangcun Township, Henan, in Huixian
- Zhangcun Township, Jiangxi, in Dexing
- Zhangcun Township, Shanxi, in Qinshui County
- Zhangcun Township, Jiangshan, Zhejiang
- Zhangcun Township, Qingyuan County, Zhejiang

== Subdistricts ==
- Zhangcun Subdistrict, Xingtai (章村街道), in Qiaoxi District, Xingtai, Hebei
- Zhangcun Subdistrict, Houma, Shanxi (张村街道)
