= Lai Kok Fung =

Singapore-based writer and tech entrepreneur

- 赖国芳
- Born: 1963 (age 62–63); Malaysia
- Citizenship: Singaporean
- Education: Ph.D. in Electrical and Computer Engineering, University of Wisconsin
- Occupations: Tech entrepreneur, university lecturer, writer, composer, cultural and creative platform founder
- Employer: National University of Singapore (Adjunct Professor)
- Known for: Fukan (人间烟火), "Confession of a Letter" (信的告白), The Teacher Appreciation Banquet (谢师会)
- Website: fukan.my jayoninc.com

Lai Kok Fung (Chinese: 赖国芳; born 1963) is a tech entrepreneur, university lecturer, writer, composer, and founder of a cultural and creative platform.

== Biography and early life ==
Born in Alor Setar, Malaysia in 1963, Lai Kok Fung is a Singapore-based writer and tech entrepreneur recognized for his "dual-track" career bridging technology and culture. He completed his Chinese-medium primary and Malay-medium secondary education across Kedah and Perlis before moving to Singapore in 1982 under an ASEAN Scholarship to attend National Junior College. Lai graduated with first-class honors in Electrical Engineering from the National University of Singapore (NUS) in 1988. He later earned his Ph.D. in Electrical and Computer Engineering from the University of Wisconsin–Madison in 1994, supported by a National Computer Board scholarship.

== Technology career and cultural pivot ==
While at the University of Wisconsin–Madison, Lai studied under Roland Chin, specialising in pattern recognition and machine learning. Upon graduating in 1994, he joined the National Computer Board as an applied researcher to develop and implement these technologies. In 1999, Lai commercialised his team's research by spinning out BuzzCity, an internet startup built on the core technologies they had developed. As Chief Executive Officer, he secured multiple rounds of venture capital, including early funding during the dot-com boom and a later investment from Naspers, scaling the company into a global mobile advertising platform focused on emerging markets across Asia and Africa from 2008.

Following BuzzCity’s acquisition by Mobads in 2016, Lai pivoted his career to focus on the cultural and creative sectors while concurrently entering academia. Since 2017, he has served as an Adjunct Professor at the School of Computing in the National University of Singapore, where he teaches digital marketing, mentors high-tech startups, and consults for small and medium-sized enterprises (SMEs). In 2026, he published Digital Marketing with AI Companions, a textbook synthesising his years of entrepreneurial experience, digital marketing consultancy, and pedagogical insights.

== Cultural and creative platform ==
In 2016, Lai founded the digital cultural platform Fukan (fukan.my / 人间烟火) to cultivate a sustainable ecosystem for the Southeast Asian Chinese creative industries. The platform unites writers, musicians, and visual artists from both Malaysia and Singapore. In 2024, he expanded the ecosystem by launching Fukan Community (people.fukan.my / 人间社区), an interactive space that allows creators to establish their own public accounts, publish content freely, and foster direct engagement with their peers and audience.

== Literary career and theatre ==
As a writer spanning prose, fiction, and cultural commentary, Lai has contributed significantly to the Southeast Asian Chinese literary landscape. His essay "Grandmother's Words 4.03" (祖母4.03言) was selected for inclusion in Malaysian Independent Chinese Secondary School textbooks, and his work "A Lone Marathon" (一个人的马拉松) was featured in the Mahua (Malaysian Chinese) Contemporary Prose Selection 2013–2016.

His short story The Teacher Appreciation Banquet (谢师会) was adapted into a critically acclaimed stage play in 2023. Exploring the themes of generational shifts, idealism, and the fractures between teachers and students against the backdrop of the 2018 Malaysian general election, the theatrical adaptation won two major awards at the 19th Ada Drama Awards (戏炬奖). Following its initial success, the play underwent multiple restaged runs across Malaysia, including a prominent showcase at the Permaisuri Zarith Sofiah Opera House in Johor Bahru in 2026, held in conjunction with the Malaysian Social Entrepreneurship Foundation (MSEF).

== Music and Xinyao ==
Lai was an early participant in Singapore's Xinyao (campus folk music) movement during the 1980s. While studying at National Junior College, he composed "Confession of a Letter" (信的告白) in 1983, which became a widely circulated and definitive song of the era. Decades later, he released a reinterpreted version, "Confession of a Letter 2.0," in 2025, followed by the release of an English track, "Home Away from Home," in 2026, which he had originally composed in 1983 alongside fellow ASEAN scholars Lian Siew Chin and Kenny Sin.

== Major works ==
Below is a chronological summary of his major published and creative works:

Year	Title	Genre/Type
1983	Confession of a Letter (信的告白)	Lyrics and Music
2018	Renjian Geyu (人间歌语)	Prose / Cultural Commentary
2018	We Are All on a Journey (我们都在旅途上)	Prose Collection
2020	Digital Marketing (数码营销)	Textbook
2023	The Teacher Appreciation Banquet (谢师会)	Original Novel / Stage Play
2024	Growing Up as the 60s Generation 2.0 (成长中的六字辈2.0)	Essay Collection
2025	Confession of a Letter 2.0 (信的告白2.0)	Lyrics and Music
2026	Home Away from Home	Music
2026	Digital Marketing with AI Companions	Textbook
