= Renmin Street Subdistrict =

Renmin Street Subdistrict or Renminjie Subdistrict may refer to these subdistricts in China:

- Renmin Street Subdistrict, Zhumadian, Henan
- Renmin Street Subdistrict, Xining, Qinghai

== See also ==
- Renmin Road Subdistrict (disambiguation)
- Renmin Subdistrict (disambiguation)
