= Wangtun Township =

Coordinates: 34.75137°N 114.40748°E

Wangtun Township 汪屯乡
- Township

Chinese transcription(s)
- Interactive map of Wangtun Township
- Country: China
- Province: Henan
- Prefecture: Kaifeng
- District: Yuwangtai
- Time zone: UTC+8 (China Standard Time)

Wangtun Township (Chinese: 汪屯乡; pinyin: Wāngtún Xiāng) is a township of Yuwangtai District, Kaifeng, Henan, China.

== See also ==
- List of township-level divisions of Henan
