= Shilong, Pingdingshan =

Coordinates: 33°54′N 112°53′E

Shilong 石龙区
- District
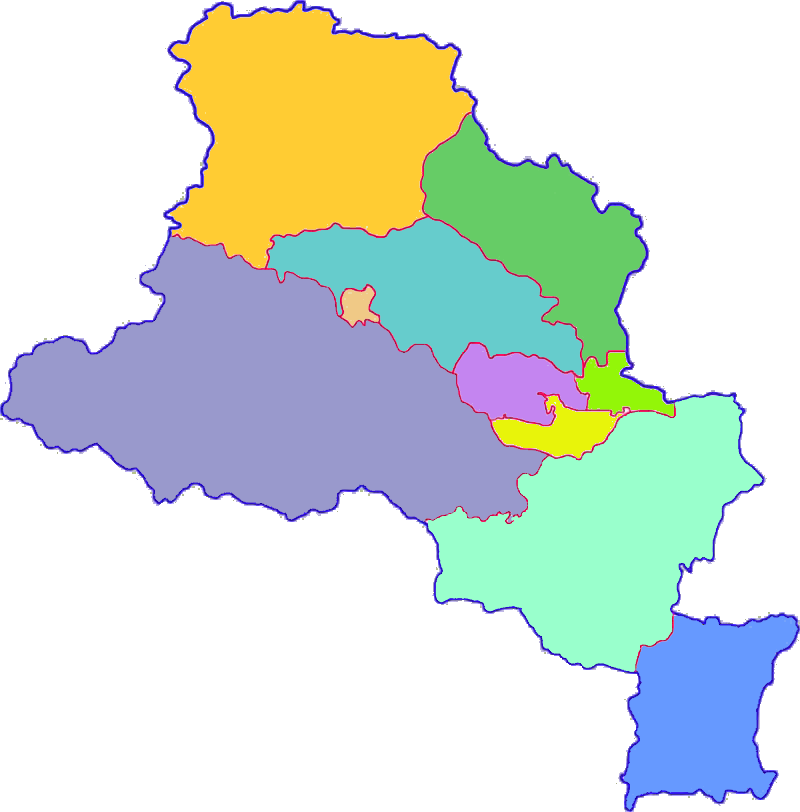
- Shilong in Pingdingshan

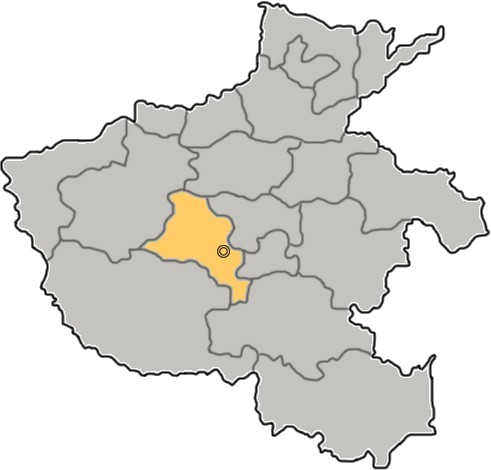
- Pingdingshan in Henan
- Country: People's Republic of China
- Province: Henan
- Prefecture-level city: Pingdingshan

Area
  - Total: 35 km^{2} (14 sq mi)

Population (2019)
  - Total: 51,500
  - Density: 1,500/km^{2} (3,800/sq mi)
- Time zone: UTC+8 (China Standard)
- Postal code: 467045

Shilong District (simplified Chinese: 石龙区; traditional Chinese: 石龍區; pinyin: Shílóng Qū; lit. 'stone dragon') is a district of the city of Pingdingshan, Henan, China.

== Administrative divisions ==
As of 2012, this district is divided to 4 subdistricts.

Subdistricts

- Gaozhuang Subdistrict (高庄街道)
- Longxing Subdistrict (龙兴街道)
- Renminlu Subdistrict (人民路街道)
- Longhe Subdistrict (龙河街道)
