= Yicheng, Zhumadian =

Yicheng 驿城区
- District
- Location in Henan
- Coordinates: 32°58′37″N 114°02′24″E
- Country: People's Republic of China
- Province: Henan
- Prefecture-level city: Zhumadian

Area
  - Total: 886 km^{2} (342 sq mi)

Population (2019)
  - Total: 1,027,700
  - Density: 1,160/km^{2} (3,000/sq mi)
- Time zone: UTC+8 (China Standard)
- Postal code: 463000
- Website: http://www.zmdycq.gov.cn

Yicheng District (simplified Chinese: 驿城区; traditional Chinese: 驛城區; pinyin: Yìchéng Qū) is the only district of the city of Zhumadian, Henan province, China.

== Administrative divisions ==
As of 2017, this district is divided to 13 subdistricts, 5 towns and 3 townships.

Subdistricts

- Renmin Subdistrict (人民街道)
- Dongfeng Subdistrict (东风街道)
- Xiyuan Subdistrict (西园街道)
- Xinhua Subdistrict (新华街道)
- Nanhai Subdistrict (南海街道)
- Laojie Subdistrict (老街街道)
- Xianglin Subdistrict (橡林街道)
- Xuesong Subdistrict (雪松街道)
- Shunhe Subdistrict (顺河街道)
- Liuge Subdistrict (刘阁街道)
- Xiangshan Subdistrict (香山街道)
- Gucheng Subdistrict (古城街道)
- Jinqiao Subdistrict (金桥街道)

Towns

- Shuitun (水屯镇)
- Shahedian (沙河店镇)
- Banqiao (板桥镇)
- Zhushi (诸市镇)
- Yifeng (蚁蜂镇)

Townships

- Laohe Township (老河乡)
- Zhugudong Township (朱古洞乡)
- Humiao Township (胡庙乡)
