= Yindu, Anyang =

Yindu 殷都区
- District
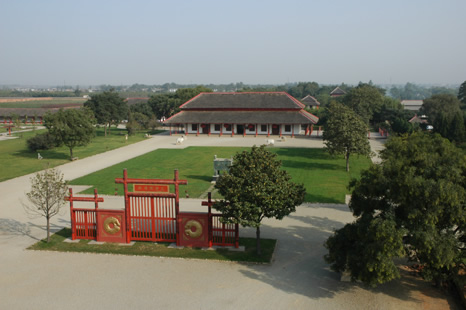

- Location in Henan
- Coordinates: 36°06′36″N 114°18′11″E
- Country: People's Republic of China
- Province: Henan
- Prefecture-level city: Anyang

Area
  - Total: 70 km^{2} (27 sq mi)

Population (2019)
  - Total: 276,500
  - Density: 3,900/km^{2} (10,000/sq mi)
- Time zone: UTC+8 (China Standard)
- Postal code: 455000

Yindu District (Chinese: 殷都区; pinyin: Yīndū Qū) is a district of the city of Anyang, Henan province, China. The archeological site of Yinxu is located in Yindu District's Xijiao Township.

== Administrative divisions ==
As of 2012, this district is divided to 9 subdistricts and 1 township.

Subdistricts

- Beimeng Subdistrict (北蒙街道)
- Dianchanglu Subdistrict (电厂路街道)
- Lizhen Subdistrict (李珍街道)
- Meiyuanzhuang Subdistrict (梅园庄街道)
- Qingfengjie Subdistrict (清风街街道)
- Shachang Subdistrict (纱厂街道)
- Shuiye Subdistrict (水冶街道)
- Tiexilu Subdistrict (铁西路街道)
- Xiangtai Subdistrict (相台街道)

Townships

- Xijiao Township (西郊乡)
