= Shawo Township, Henan =

Shawo Township 沙沃乡
- Township
- Location in Henan
- Coordinates: 34°26′14″N 114°38′38″E
- Country: People's Republic of China
- Province: Henan
- Prefecture-level city: Kaifeng
- County: Qi
- Elevation: 63 m (207 ft)
- Time zone: UTC+8 (China Standard)
- Area code: 0378

Shawo (Chinese: 沙沃; pinyin: Shāwò) is a township of Qi County, Kaifeng in eastern Henan province, China, located 19 kilometres (12 mi) southwest of the county seat and more than 45 km (28 mi) southeast of downtown Kaifeng. As of 2011, it has 26 villages under its administration.

== See also ==
- List of township-level divisions of Henan
