= Xianrenzhuang Subdistrict =

Xianrenzhuang Subdistrict 仙人庄街道
- Subdistrict

Chinese transcription(s)
  - Chinese: 仙人庄街道
  - Pinyin: Xiānrénzhuāng jiēdào
- Location in Henan
- Coordinates: 34°42′1″N 114°18′14″E
- Country: China
- Province: Henan
- Prefecture: Kaifeng
- District: Gulou District
- Time zone: UTC+8 (China Standard Time)

Xianrenzhuang Subdistrict (Chinese: 仙人庄街道, literally, "Immortal's Village Subdistrict"), formerly Xianrenzhuang Township (Chinese: 仙人庄乡) is a township-level division of Gulou District of the prefecture-level city of Kaifeng, in the province of Henan, China.

As of 1997, Xianrenzhuang Township occupied 35.3 square km in the southwestern part of Kaifeng's main urban area, and had around 10,000 residents.

Although located only a few kilometers southwest of downtown Kaifeng, the Xianrenzhuang area, according to Google Maps, is still mostly rural.

== History ==
The predecessor of today's Xianrenzhuang subdistrict was incorporated as Xincheng Township (新城乡) in 1949, and reorganized as Zhongxin Township (中心乡, literally, "Central Township") in 1955. In 1958, with the Great Leap Forward, the township became incorporated into Shandian ("Lightning") People's commune (闪电公社, Shǎndiàn Gōngshè). In 1980 the separate Xianrenzhuang People's Commune was created, which became a township, within the then-existing Kaifeng County, in 1984. With the reorganization of Kaifeng County in 2005, the township became part of Kaifengh City's Gulou District.

== See also ==
- List of township-level divisions of Henan
