= West Zhongyuan Road Subdistrict =

Coordinates: 34.75502°N 113.6051°E

Zhongyuanxilu 中原西路街道
- Subdistrict

Chinese transcription(s)
- Interactive map of Zhongyuanxilu
- Country: China
- Province: Henan
- Prefecture: Zhengzhou
- District: Zhongyuan District
- Time zone: UTC+8 (China Standard Time)

Zhongyuanxilu (Chinese: 中原西路; pinyin: Zhōngyuánxīlù) is a subdistrict in Zhongyuan District, Zhengzhou in the province of Henan, China.

== See also ==
- List of township-level divisions of Henan
