= Gulou, Kaifeng =

Coordinates: 34°48′04″N 114°20′28″E

Gulou 鼓楼区
- District
- Interactive map of Gulou
- Country: People's Republic of China
- Province: Henan
- Prefecture-level city: Kaifeng

Area
  - Total: 58 km^{2} (22 sq mi)

Population (2019)
  - Total: 157,000
  - Density: 2,700/km^{2} (7,000/sq mi)
- Time zone: UTC+8 (China Standard)
- Postal code: 475000

Gulou District (simplified Chinese: 鼓楼区; traditional Chinese: 鼓樓區; pinyin: Gǔlóu Qū; lit. 'drumtower district') is a district of the city of Kaifeng, Henan province, China.

== Administrative divisions ==
As of 2012, this district is divided to 8 subdistricts.

Subdistricts

- Jiucun Subdistrict (九村街道)
- Wolong Subdistrict (卧龙街道)
- Wuyi Subdistrict (五一街道)
- Xiangguosi Subdistrict (相国寺街道)
- Xianrenzhuang Subdistrict (仙人庄街道)
- Xinhua Subdistrict (新华街道)
- Xisimen Subdistrict (西司门街道)
- Zhouqiao Subdistrict (州桥街道)
