= Songshan Road Subdistrict, Zhengzhou =

Songshan Road Subdistrict 嵩山路街道
- Subdistrict
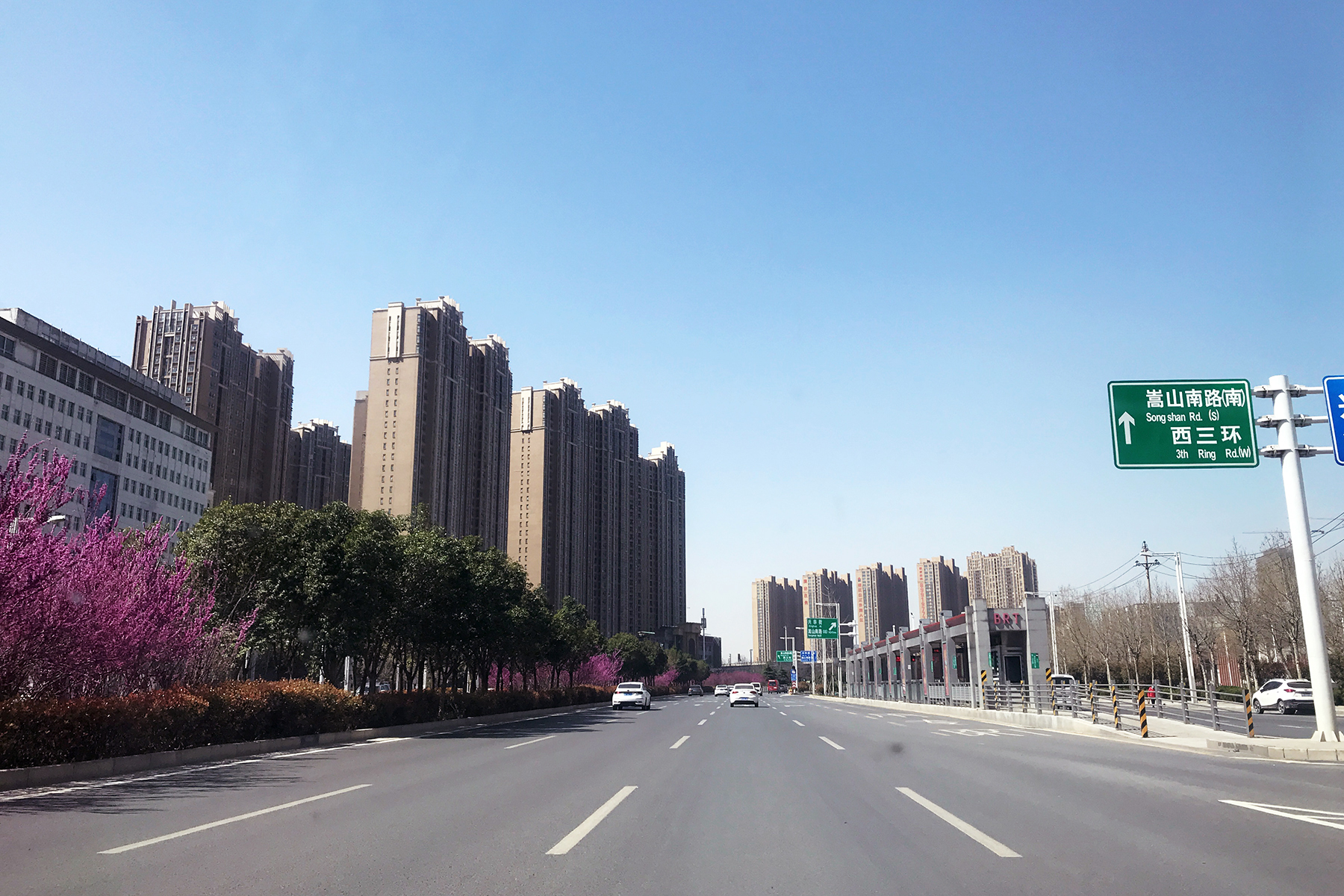
- Ring road, Zhengzhou

- Location in Henan
- Coordinates: 34°43′28″N 113°37′10″E
- Country: People's Republic of China
- Province: Henan
- Prefecture-level city: Zhengzhou
- District: Erqi
- Village-level divisions: 13 residential communities
- Elevation: 119 m (390 ft)
- Time zone: UTC+8 (China Standard)
- Postal code: 450006
- Area code: 0371

Songshan Road Subdistrict (Chinese: 嵩山路街道; pinyin: Sōngshān Lù Jiēdào) is a subdistrict of Erqi District, in the heart of Zhengzhou, Henan, People's Republic of China. As of 2011, it has 13 residential communities (社区) under its administration.

== See also ==
- List of township-level divisions of Henan
