= Yuwangtai, Kaifeng =

Coordinates: 34°46′37″N 114°20′53″E

Yuwangtai 禹王台区
- District
- Interactive map of Yuwangtai
- Country: People's Republic of China
- Province: Henan
- Prefecture-level city: Kaifeng

Area
  - Total: 56 km^{2} (22 sq mi)

Population (2019)
  - Total: 141,300
  - Density: 2,500/km^{2} (6,500/sq mi)
- Time zone: UTC+8 (China Standard)
- Postal code: 475003

Yuwangtai District (Chinese: 禹王台区; pinyin: Yǔwángtái Qū; lit. 'Platform of King Yu') is a district of the city of Kaifeng, Henan province, China.

It is named after a shrine dedicated to Yu the Great, a legendary ruler in ancient China famed for his introduction of flood control. The temple was built in 1523 during the Ming Dynasty amid frequent flooding by the Yellow River. The paifang at the base of the temple, built in 1762 during the Qing Dynasty, reads "Platform of the Ancient Performance" (古吹台; gǔ chuī tái), named for a musician, Shikuang (師曠), who used to play there during the Spring and Autumn period.

== Administrative divisions ==
As of 2012, this district is divided to 5 subdistricts and 2 townships.

Subdistricts

- Caishi Subdistrict (菜市街道)
- Fanta Subdistrict (繁塔街道)
- Guanfang Subdistrict (官坊街道)
- Sanlibao Subdistrict (三里堡街道)
- Xinmenguan Subdistrict (新门关街道)

Townships

- Nanjiao Township (南郊乡)
- Wangtun Township (汪屯乡)
