= Shuangmiao, Inner Mongolia =

Shuangmiao 双庙镇
- Town
- Location in Inner Mongolia
- Coordinates: 40°46′15″N 106°52′21″E
- Country: People's Republic of China
- Region: Inner Mongolia
- Prefecture-level city: Bayannur
- Banner: Hanggin Rear
- Elevation: 1,041 m (3,415 ft)
- Time zone: UTC+8 (China Standard)

Shuangmiao (simplified Chinese: 双庙; traditional Chinese: 雙廟; pinyin: Shuāngmiào; lit. 'double temple') is a town under the administration of Hanggin Rear Banner in southwestern Inner Mongolia, China, located about 26 kilometres (16 mi) southwest of the banner seat and 44 km (27 mi) north-northwest of downtown Bayannur. As of 2011, it has 14 villages under its administration.

== See also ==
- List of township-level divisions of Inner Mongolia
