= Yulin, Sichuan =

Yulin 玉林镇
- Town
- Location in Sichuan
- Coordinates: 31°0′17″N 105°3′17″E
- Country: People's Republic of China
- Province: Sichuan
- Prefecture-level city: Mianyang
- County: Santai County
- Time zone: UTC+8 (China Standard)

Yulin (Chinese: 玉林; pinyin: Yùlín) is a town under the administration of Santai County, Sichuan, China. As of 2018, it has one residential community and nine villages under its administration.
