= Longhe Subdistrict =

Subdistrict in Pingdingshan, Henan, China

Longhe Subdistrict (Chinese: 龙河街道) is a subdistrict located in Shilong District, Pingdingshan, Henan, China.
