= Xifang =

Xifang can refer to:

- Xifang language, member of the Hlai languages, spoken in Hainan, China
- Zhang Xifang, another name for Anna Segedi (born 2000), American ice hockey player
