= Renmin Street Subdistrict, Zhumadian =

Renmin Street Subdistrict 人民街街道
- Subdistrict
- Location in Henan
- Coordinates: 32°58′29″N 114°1′25″E
- Country: China
- Province: Henan
- Prefecture-level city: Zhumadian
- District: Yicheng District
- Time zone: UTC+8 (China Standard Time)

Renmin Street Subdistrict (Chinese: 人民街街道; pinyin: Rénmínjiē Jiēdào) is a subdistrict situated in Yicheng District, Zhumadian, Henan, China. As of 2020, it administers the following six residential neighborhoods:

- Zhongshan Street Community (中山街社区)
- Fengguang Road South Community (风光路南段社区)
- Fengguang Road Central Community (风光路中段社区)
- Jiankang Road Community (健康路社区)
- Jianxin Street Community (建新街社区)
- Xiangyang Street Community (向阳街社区)

== See also ==
- List of township-level divisions of Henan
