= Changzhuang Township =

Changzhuang Township 常庄乡
- Rural Township
- Chángzhuāng Xiāng
- Location in Hebei Location in China
- Coordinates: 37°52′18″N 117°15′23″E
- Country: People's Republic of China
- Province: Hebei
- Prefecture-level city: Cangzhou
- County: Yanshan

Area
  - Total: 32.83 km^{2} (12.68 sq mi)

Population (2010)
  - Total: 19,375
  - Density: 590.1/km^{2} (1,528/sq mi)
- Time zone: UTC+8 (China Standard)

Changzhuang Township (Chinese: 常庄乡; pinyin: Chángzhuāng Xiāng) is a rural township located in Yanshan County, Cangzhou, Hebei, China. According to the 2010 census, Changzhuang Township had a population of 19,375, including 9,998 males and 9,377 females. The population was distributed as follows: 3,547 people aged under 14, 14,179 people aged between 15 and 64, and 1,649 people aged over 65.

== See also ==
- List of township-level divisions of Hebei
