= Meiyuanzhuang Subdistrict =

Township level division of Henan, China

Coordinates: 36°6′28″N 114°17′51″E

Meiyuanzhuang Subdstrict is a subdistrict of Yindu District, Anyang, Henan, China. It is divided into Meiyuan Community, Gangsiqu Community, Gangwuqu Community, Gangliuqu Community, Fulilu Community, Ganghualu Community, Gangsilu Community, Gangerlu Community, Guoyuan Community, Beixinzhuang Community and Dongfeng Community.
