= Xijiao Township =

Township in Anyang, Henan, China

Coordinates: 36.10931°N 114.28389°E

Xijiao Township is a township in Yindu District, Anyang, Henan, China. It is divided into Wangyukou Community, Xiliang Village, Dongliang Village, Wangshao Village, Nanliusi Village, Beiliusi Village, Guoliusi Village, Shiche Village, Pianjiazhuang Village, Xiaotun Village, Huayuanzhuang Village, Xiaozhuang Village, Sipanmo Villages, Fanjiazhuang Village, Feng'an Village, Beishiwang Village, Lushiwang Village, Zhaochangzhuang Village and Nanshiwang Village. The Late Shang capital of Yinxu is located in Xiaotun Village, Xijiao.

Xijiao covers an area of 23.3 sq km. There are 30,980 people and 9012 households.
