= Gaozhuang Subdistrict =

Subdistrict in Pingdingshan, Henan, China

Gaozhuang Subdistrict (Chinese: 高庄街道) is a subdistrict located in Shilong District, Pingdingshan, Henan, China.
