= Longxing Subdistrict =

Subdistrict in Pingdingshan, Henan, China

Longxing Subdistrict (Chinese: 龙兴街道) is a subdistrict located in Shilong District, Pingdingshan, Henan, China.
