= Shuangmiao Township, Xuchang =

Shuangmiao Township 双庙乡
- Township
- Location in Henan
- Coordinates: 33°54′27″N 113°38′08″E
- Country: People's Republic of China
- Province: Henan
- Prefecture-level city: Xuchang
- County: Xiangcheng
- Elevation: 83 m (272 ft)
- Time zone: UTC+8 (China Standard)

Shuangmiao Township (simplified Chinese: 双庙乡; traditional Chinese: 雙廟鄉; pinyin: Shuāngmiào Xiāng; lit. 'double temple') is a township of Xiangcheng County in central Henan province, China, located about 15 kilometres (9.3 mi) northeast of the county seat and 21 kilometres (13 mi) southwest of downtown Xuchang. As of 2011, it has 34 villages under its administration.

== See also ==
- List of township-level divisions of Henan
