= Yulin Subdistrict, Chengdu =

Yulin Subdistrict 玉林街道
- Subdistrict
- Location in Sichuan
- Coordinates: 30°37′35″N 104°3′29″E
- Country: People's Republic of China
- Province: Sichuan
- Prefecture-level city: Chengdu
- District: Wuhou District
- Time zone: UTC+8 (China Standard)

Yulin Subdistrict (Chinese: 玉林街道; pinyin: Yùlín Jiēdào) is a subdistrict in Wuhou District, Chengdu, Sichuan, China. As of 2018, it has eight residential communities under its administration.

== See also ==
- List of township-level divisions of Sichuan
