= Jinpu =

Jinpu 金铺镇
- Town
- Location in Henan
- Coordinates: 33°06′13″N 114°18′39″E
- Country: People's Republic of China
- Province: Henan
- Prefecture-level city: Zhumadian
- County: Runan
- Time zone: UTC+8 (China Standard)

Jinpu (simplified Chinese: 金铺; traditional Chinese: 金舖; pinyin: Jīnpù) is a town in southeastern Henan province, China. It is under the administration of Runan County.
