= Wangu =

Wangu is a given name. Notable people with the name include:

- Wangu Gome (born 1993), Namibian footballer
- Wangu wa Makeri (c. 1856–1915 or 1936), Kikuyu tribal chief
