= Yulin, Jilin =

Yulin 榆林镇
- Town
- Location in Jilin
- Coordinates: 40°59′30″N 125°56′19″E
- Country: People's Republic of China
- Province: Jilin
- Prefecture-level city: Tonghua
- County-level city: Ji'an
- Time zone: UTC+8 (China Standard)

Yulin (Chinese: 榆林; pinyin: Yúlín) is a town under the administration of Ji'an, Jilin, China. As of 2018, it has one residential community and nine villages under its administration.
