= Renmin Road Subdistrict, Puyang =

Renmin Road Subdistrict 人民路街道
- Subdistrict
- Location in Henan
- Coordinates: 35°45′44″N 115°0′46″E
- Country: China
- Province: Henan
- Prefecture-level city: Puyang
- District: Hualong District
- Time zone: UTC+8 (China Standard Time)

Renmin Road Subdistrict (Chinese: 人民路街道; pinyin: Rénmínlù Jiēdào) is a subdistrict situated in Hualong District, Puyang, Henan, China. As of 2020, it administers the following ten residential neighborhoods:

- Xinghua (兴化)
- Zhenxing (振兴)
- Yongle (永乐)
- Yixing (易兴)
- Guangming (光明)
- Chonghua (重华)
- Botouji (波头集)
- Jinrong (金融)
- Jindi (金堤)
- Zhenhua (振化)

== See also ==
- List of township-level divisions of Henan
