= Renminlu Subdistrict, Pingdingshan =

Renmin Road Subdistrict 人民路街道
- Subdistrict
- Location in Henan
- Coordinates: 33°54′15″N 112°53′41″E
- Country: China
- Province: Henan
- Prefecture-level city: Pingdingshan
- District: Shilong District
- Time zone: UTC+8 (China Standard Time)

Renminlu Subdistrict (Chinese: 人民路街道; pinyin: Rénmínlù Jiēdào) is a subdistrict situated in Shilong District, Pingdingshan, Henan, China. As of 2020, it administers Longxiang Residential Community (龙祥社区) and the following six villages:

- Xiazhuang Village (夏庄村)
- Guanzhuang Village (关庄村)
- Nanguzhuang Village (南顾庄村)
- Hezhuang Village (何庄村)
- Kangwa Village (康洼村)
- Xiangchang Village (相厂村)

== See also ==
- List of township-level divisions of Henan
