= Shuangmiao Township, Sichuan =

Shuangmiao Township 双庙乡
- Township
- Location in Sichuan
- Coordinates: 30°59′15″N 107°21′49″E
- Country: People's Republic of China
- Province: Sichuan
- Prefecture-level city: Dazhou
- County: Da
- Elevation: 357 m (1,171 ft)
- Time zone: UTC+8 (China Standard)
- Area code: 0818

Shuangmiao Township (simplified Chinese: 双庙乡; traditional Chinese: 雙廟鄉; pinyin: Shuāngmiào Xiāng; lit. 'double temple') is a township of Da County in northeastern Sichuan province, China, located about 27 kilometres (17 mi) south-southwest of downtown Dazhou. As of 2011, it has 2 residential communities (社区) and 20 villages under its administration.
