= Xinli =

Xinli may refer to:

== People ==
- Peng Xinli, Chinese professional footballer
- Yang Xinli, retired Chinese politician

== Other uses ==
- Xinli Subdistrict, a subdistrict in Dongli District, Tianjin, China
- Xinli station, a station in Dongli District, Tianjin, China
