= Renmin Subdistrict, Weinan =

Renmin Subdistrict 人民街道
- Subdistrict
- Location in China
- Coordinates: 34°30′4″N 109°30′25″E
- Country: China
- Province: Shaanxi
- Prefecture-level city: Weinan
- District: Linwei District
- Time zone: UTC+8 (China Standard Time)

Renmin Subdistrict (Chinese: 人民街道; pinyin: Rénmín Jiēdào) is a subdistrict situated in Linwei District, Weinan, Shaanxi, China. As of 2020, it administers Shuguang Village (曙光村) and the following eleven residential neighborhoods:

- Yuanlipu Community (园里堡社区)
- Nantang Community (南塘社区)
- Shengli Community (胜利社区)
- Xiaoqiao Community (小桥社区)
- Dongfeng Community (东风社区)
- Beitang Community (北塘社区)
- Xinmin Community (新民社区)
- Minsheng Community (民生社区)
- Youxi Community (沋西社区)
- Xiaozhai Community (小寨社区)
- Xuanhua Community (宣化社区)

== See also ==
- List of township-level divisions of Shaanxi
