= Zhangcun, Mianchi County =

Zhangcun 张村镇
- Town
- Location within Henan
- Coordinates: 34.7891340°N 111.6438406°E
- Country: China
- Province: Henan
- Prefecture-level city: Sanmenxia
- County: Mianchi

Area
  - Town: 52 km^{2} (20 sq mi)

Population (2019)
  - Town: 26,000
  - Urban: 9,000
  - Rural: 17,000

Zhangcun is a town of Mianchi County, Sanmenxia, Henan, China. It was formally established in 1960 as Zhangcun commune, changed to Zhangcun township in 1984 and changed to town in 1995. In 2019, the town had a population of 26,000 people.

The local economy relies mainly on coal, bauxite and limestone mining, and wheat and tobacco cultivation. As mineral resources in the town neared exhaustion, the local economy has been in a downturn.

== Administrative divisions ==
Zhangcun town governs over:

Residential communities

- Yongxing (永兴社区)
- Xinyuan (鑫源社区)

Villages

- Zhangcun (张村村)
- Dujiacun (杜家村)
- Henanzhuang (河南庄村)
- Anbei (庵北村)
- Louquan (漏泉村)
- Suqincun (苏秦村村)
- Jingcun (荆村村)
- Sangshuping (桑树坪村)
- Sanhuagou (三化沟村)
- Caoyao (曹窑村)
- Gaoqiao (高桥村)
- Lijin (利津村)
- Yangjiaxincun (杨家新村村)
