= Yulin Township, Xinxiang =

Yulin Township 榆林乡
- Township
- Location in Henan
- Coordinates: 35°12′33″N 114°3′28″E
- Country: People's Republic of China
- Province: Henan
- Prefecture-level city: Xinxiang
- County: Yanjin County
- Time zone: UTC+8 (China Standard)

Yulin Township (simplified Chinese: 榆林乡; traditional Chinese: 榆林鄉; pinyin: Yúlín Xiāng) is a township under the administration of Yanjin County, Xinxiang, Henan, China. As of 2018, it has 14 villages under its administration.
