= Fukan =

Fukan 福堪镇
- Town
- Location in Henan
- Coordinates: 36°06′37″N 115°24′32″E
- Country: People's Republic of China
- Province: Henan
- Prefecture-level city: Puyang
- County: Nanle
- Time zone: UTC+8 (China Standard)

Fukan (Chinese: 福堪; pinyin: Fúkān) is a town in northeastern Henan province, China, near the border with Hebei and Shandong provinces. It is under the administration of Nanle County.
