= Zhoukou Port =

Inland river port in Henan, China

- Native name: 周口港 (Chinese)

Location
- Country: China
- Location: Zhoukou, Henan

Details
- Opened: 2005 (modern navigation restored)
- Type of Harbor: Inland river port

Statistics
- Annual cargo tonnage: 55.43 million tonnes (2025)
- Annual container volume: 175,400 TEU (2025)

Zhoukou Port (Chinese: 周口港; pinyin: Zhōukǒu Gǎng) is an inland river port complex in Zhoukou, southeastern Henan, China. Its terminals are principally situated along the Shaying River, a major tributary of the Huai River.

Vessels from Zhoukou can travel downstream through the Shaying and Huai river systems. Connections through the Grand Canal, the Yangtze River and waterways in Jiangsu and Anhui provide access to river and coastal ports including Nanjing, Shanghai, Lianyungang and Dafeng. In 2025, ports administered within Zhoukou handled 55.4348 million tonnes of cargo and 175,400 TEU of containers.

== History ==
Zhoukou developed near the meeting of the Sha, Ying and Jialu rivers. The settlement formerly known as Zhoujiakou became a regional centre for waterborne and overland trade during the Ming and Qing dynasties.

Navigation on the Henan section of the Shaying River was progressively interrupted during the second half of the 20th century. In the 1970s, dams and sluices without adequate navigation facilities cut off the waterway through the urban area of Zhoukou, although limited shipping continued farther downstream in Shenqiu County.

A navigation-restoration project began in 2004. On 28 December 2005, six cargo vessels with capacities of 400 tonnes reached Zhoukou. The section of the Shaying River downstream from Zhoukou became capable of year-round navigation in June 2009.

The first phase of Zhoukou Central Port began operating on 6 April 2017. On 24 December 2025, the first phase of the Central Operation Area in the port's Central Port Area opened. The project was the first dedicated inland container terminal in Henan with a designed annual capacity exceeding one million TEU.

== Areas and facilities ==
Zhoukou's municipal port-planning framework has been described as a "1+9" system. It consists of Zhoukou Central Port as the principal hub and nine port areas associated with Xihua, Shangshui, Huaiyang, Xiangcheng, Shenqiu, Taikang, Luyi, Fugou and Dancheng. The component areas include public terminals, industrial terminals and facilities intended for particular commodities or county-level cargo markets.

The Central Port Area is the core part of the port complex. A master plan approved by the Henan provincial government in January 2024 divided it into the Central and Fanying operation areas and the smaller Panlou and Yanglou port sites. The Central Operation Area was planned primarily for containers, while the Fanying Operation Area was assigned principally to bulk and general cargo. Panlou was planned for vessel services and passenger transport, and Yanglou for passenger transport.

The plan, with a planning horizon of 2035, provides for 6,260 metres of port shoreline and 72 cargo-handling berths. Planned annual capacity consists of 29.41 million tonnes of bulk and general cargo and 1.76 million TEU of containers. It also provides for road access to National Highway 329 and a railway branch connecting the Central Operation Area with Huangzhai railway station.

The first phase of the Central Operation Area contains 13 berths designed for vessels of up to the 2,000-tonne class. The berths have a combined length of 1,089 metres and a designed annual capacity of 1.075 million TEU. Its equipment includes automated quay cranes, driverless container vehicles and automated rail-mounted gantry cranes, allowing parts of the loading, transport and storage process to be operated remotely.

== Cargo ==
The port handles containers as well as bulk and general cargo. Principal cargo categories include coal, grain, metal ores, steel products and construction materials. Some terminals are connected directly with nearby industrial facilities, including grain-processing and steel-manufacturing plants.

By April 2026, Zhoukou Port had 24 chinese domestic container services and 19 connecting services for foreign-trade cargo. International shipments are generally transferred between inland vessels and seagoing services at coastal or lower-river ports rather than being carried directly from Zhoukou by ocean-going ships.

== See also ==
- Transport in Henan
- List of ports in China
