= Chuanhui, Zhoukou =

Chuanhui 川汇区
- District
- Location in Henan
- Coordinates: 33.6206°N 114.651°E
- Country: People's Republic of China
- Province: Henan
- Prefecture-level city: Zhoukou

Area
  - Total: 141 km^{2} (54 sq mi)

Population (2019)
  - Total: 721,300
  - Density: 5,120/km^{2} (13,200/sq mi)
- Time zone: UTC+8 (China Standard)
- Postal code: 466000, 466001, 466002

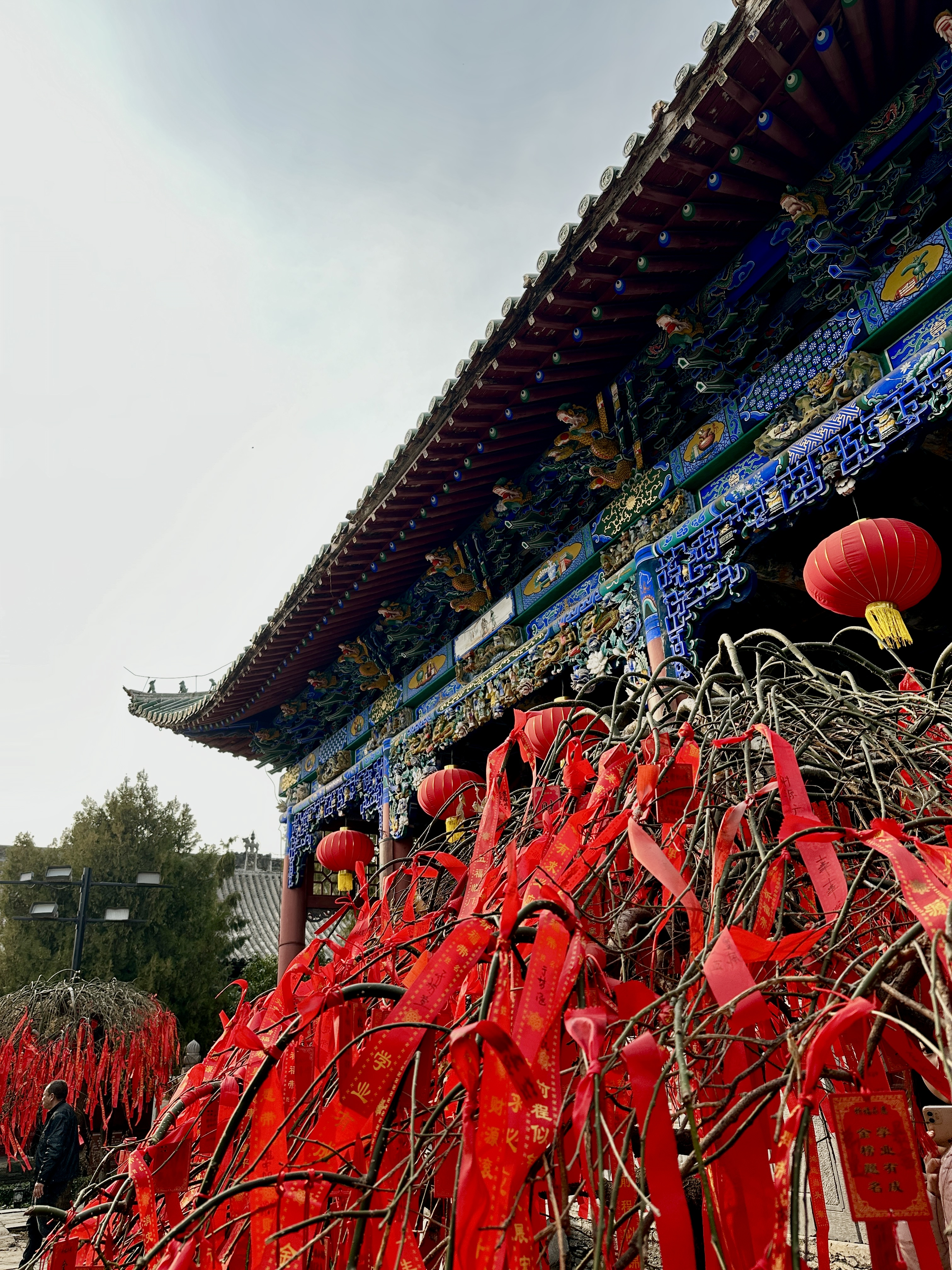
The red silk on the tree is an item used by people to pray, and their wishes will be written on it.

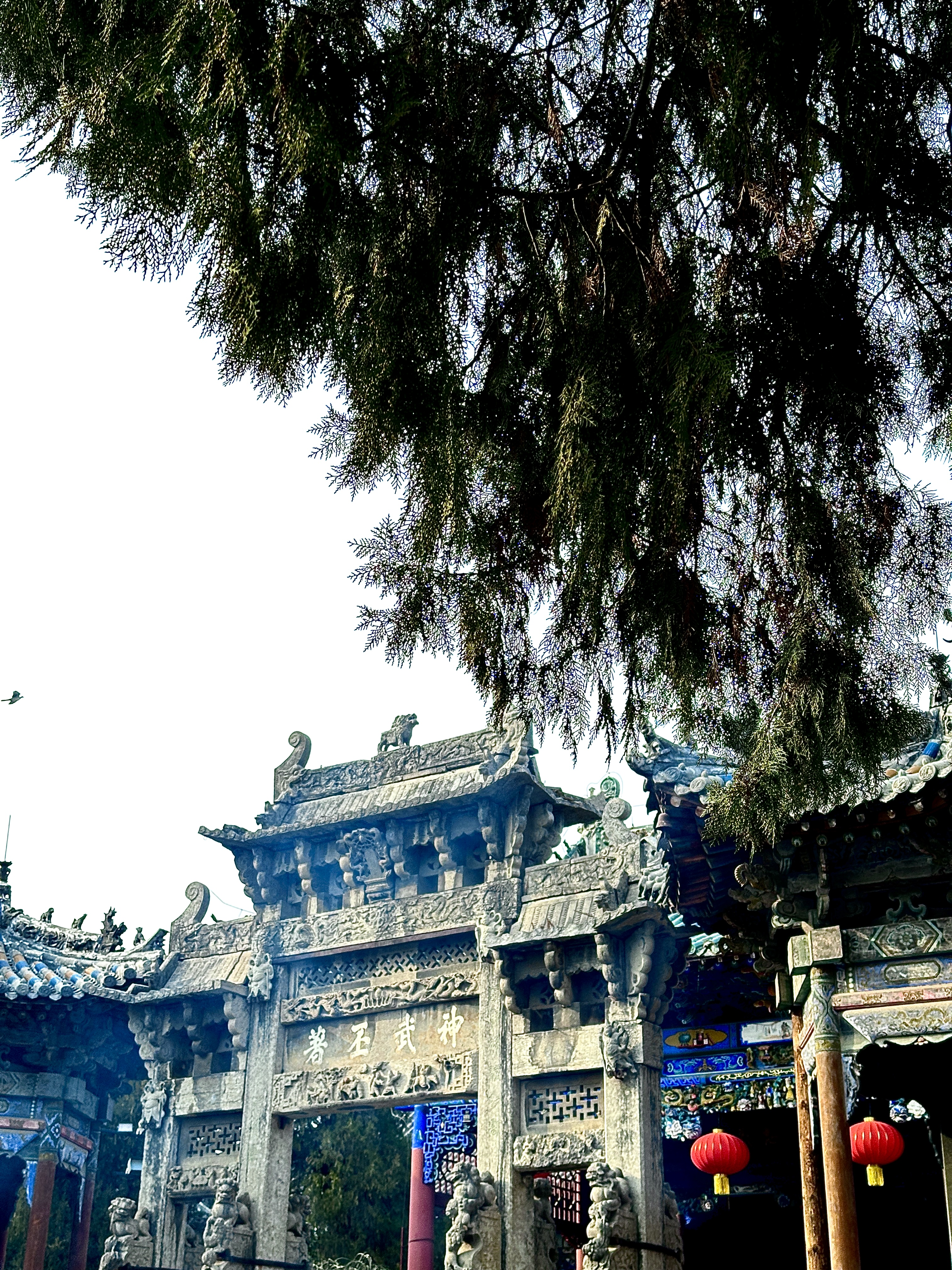
One of the Chinese traditions is to welcome the God of Wealth on the fifth day of the New Year.

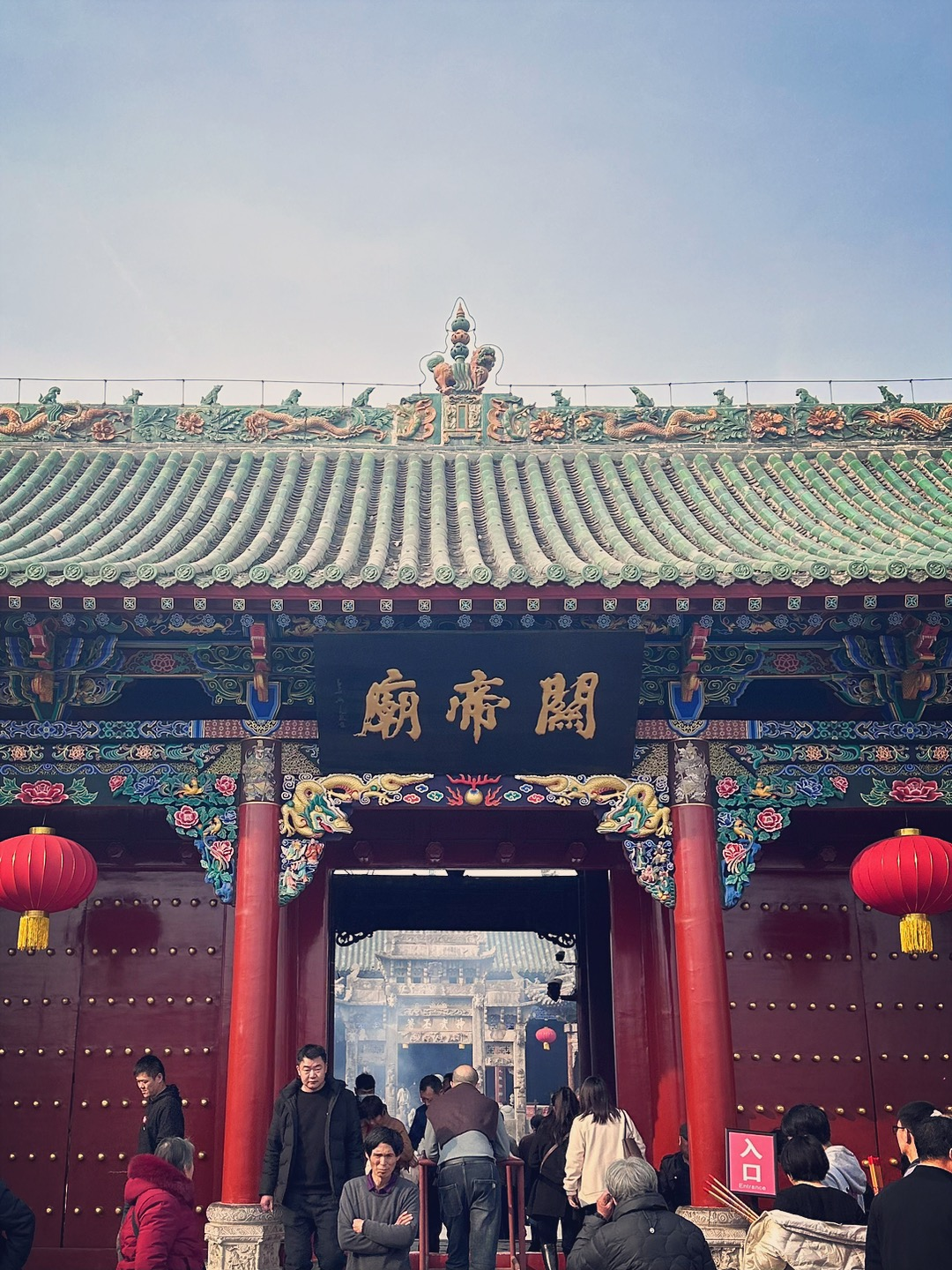
Main entrance of Guandi Temple

Chuanhui District (simplified Chinese: 川汇区; traditional Chinese: 川匯區; pinyin: Chuānhuì Qū; lit. 'river intersection') is a district of the city of Zhoukou in Henan province, China. It lies at the intersection of the Ying River, Sha River and Jialu River. The name "Chuanhui" means that three rivers come across. From the 17th to 19th centuries, it was an important port in China's Inland Waterway System, connecting the Huai River and the Yellow River. The Zhoukou City Government offices are located in Chuanhui District.

== Administrative divisions ==
As of 2012, this district is divided to 9 subdistricts and 1 township.

Subdistricts

- Chenzhou Subdistrict (陈州街道)
- Qiyi Subdistrict (七一路街道)
- Fangzhilu Subdistrict (纺织路街道)
- Renhe Subdistrict (人和街道)
- Xiaoqiao Subdistrict (小桥街道)
- Chengnan Subdistrict (城南街道)
- Chengbei Subdistrict (城北街道)
- Chengdong Subdistrict (城东街道)
- Bankou Subdistrict (搬口街道)

Townships

- Libukou Township (李埠口乡)

== Gallery ==
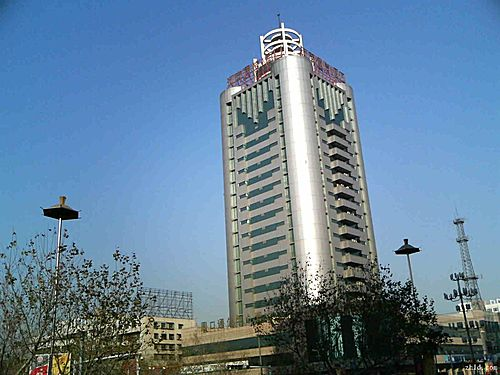

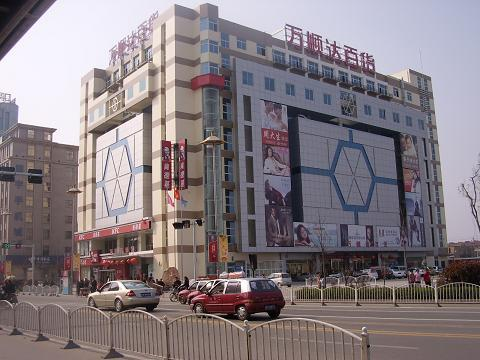

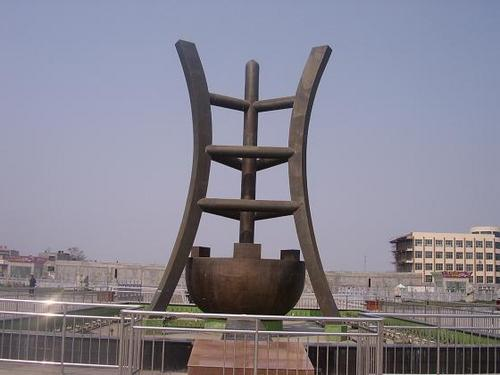
