= Wutai =

Wutai may refer to:

== China ==
- Wutai County (五台县), of Xinzhou, Shanxi
- Mount Wutai (五台山), mountain sacred to Buddhism in Shanxi
- Wutai, Dancheng County (吴台镇), town in Dancheng County, Henan
- Wutai, Pingyi County (武台镇), town in Pingyi County, Shandong
- Wutai, Zibo (梧台镇), town in Linzi District, Zibo, Shandong

== Taiwan ==
- Wutai, Pingtung (霧臺鄉), township in Pingtung County, Taiwan

== Other ==
- Wutai (Final Fantasy), fictional location in the game Final Fantasy VII
