= Baima, Henan =

Baima 白马镇
- Town
- Location in Henan
- Coordinates: 33°34′33″N 115°30′57″E
- Country: People's Republic of China
- Province: Henan
- Prefecture-level city: Zhoukou
- County: Dancheng
- Village-level divisions: 35 villages
- Elevation: 38 m (125 ft)
- Time zone: UTC+8 (China Standard)
- Area code: 0394

Baima (simplified Chinese: 白马; traditional Chinese: 白馬; pinyin: Báimǎ; lit. 'white horse') is a town of eastern Dancheng County in eastern Henan province, China, situated near the border with Anhui and 31 kilometres (19 mi) to the east-southeast of the county seat. As of 2020, it has 35 villages under its administration:

- Baima Village
- Zhangzhen Village (张珍村)
- Qianzhai Village (前寨村)
- Dasunzhuang Village (大孙庄村)
- Liulou Village (刘楼村)
- Qiaokou Village (桥口村)
- Zhangpangdian Village (张胖店村)
- Houzhai Village (后寨村)
- Zhouli Village (周李村)
- Naizhong Village (耐中村)
- Dazhou Village (大周村)
- Wudian Village (仵店村)
- Hanzhuang Village (韩庄村)
- Yanzhai Village (闫寨村)
- Chentang Village (陈堂村)
- Qilou Village (齐楼村)
- Dadiao Village (大刁村)
- Diaolou Village (刁楼村)
- Wali Village (洼李村)
- Haoli Village (郝李村)
- Haolao Village (郝老村)
- Wuzhuang Village (仵庄村)
- Lizhuang Village (李庄村)
- Xiaowanglou Village (小王楼村)
- Dawanglou Village (大王楼村)
- Huzhai Village (胡寨村)
- Gaozhuang Village (高庄村)
- Zuozhuang Village (左庄村)
- Lianzhuang Village (连庄村)
- Yangzhuang Village (杨庄村)
- Chengzhuang Village (程庄村)
- Yuge Village (于各村)
- Zhangzhuang Village (张庄村)
- Lihua Village (犁铧村)
- Laoyadian Village (老牙店村)

== See also ==
- List of township-level divisions of Henan
