= Xiangcheng City =

Xiangcheng 项城市 Siangcheng
- County-level city
- Location in Henan
- Coordinates: 33°27′57″N 114°52′31″E
- Country: People's Republic of China
- Province: Henan
- Prefecture-level city: Zhoukou

Area
  - Total: 1,083 km^{2} (418 sq mi)

Population (2019)
  - Total: 973,200
- Time zone: UTC+8 (China Standard)
- Postal code: 466200

Xiangcheng (simplified Chinese: 项城; traditional Chinese: 項城; pinyin: Xiàngchéng) is a county-level city in Zhoukou, Henan, People's Republic of China. It borders Shenqiu to the east, Shangcai to the west, Huaiyang to the north, Pingyu to the southeast, and the province of Anhui in the southeast. It has a population of 1,169,000.

Xiangcheng is known to be the birthplace of the first president of the Republic of China, Yuan Shikai.

== Administrative divisions ==
As of 2012, this city is divided to 6 subdistricts, 12 towns and 3 townships.

Subdistricts

- Huayuan Subdistrict (花园街道)
- Shuizhai Subdistrict (水寨街道)
- Dongfang Subdistrict (东方街道)
- Lianhua Subdistrict (莲花街道)
- Guangwu Subdistrict (光武街道)
- Qianfoge Subdistrict (千佛阁街道)

Towns

- Nandun (南顿镇)
- Sundian (孙店镇)
- Lizhai (李寨镇)
- Jialing (贾岭镇)
- Gaosi (高寺镇)
- Xinqiao (新桥镇)
- Fuji (付集镇)
- Guanhui (官会镇)
- Dingji (丁集镇)
- Zhengguo (郑郭镇)
- Moling (秣陵镇)
- Wangmingkou (王明口镇)

Townships

- Yongfeng Township (永丰乡)
- Fanji Township (范集乡)
- Sanzhang Township (三张店乡)

== Climate ==
Climate data for Xiangcheng, elevation 44 m (144 ft), (1991–2020 normals, extremes 1981–present)
Month	Jan	Feb	Mar	Apr	May	Jun	Jul	Aug	Sep	Oct	Nov	Dec	Year
Record high °C (°F)	19.1 (66.4)	24.8 (76.6)	33.0 (91.4)	33.8 (92.8)	38.2 (100.8)	40.8 (105.4)	40.5 (104.9)	40.6 (105.1)	37.6 (99.7)	34.8 (94.6)	28.2 (82.8)	20.9 (69.6)	40.8 (105.4)
Mean daily maximum °C (°F)	6.2 (43.2)	9.5 (49.1)	16.0 (60.8)	21.7 (71.1)	27.3 (81.1)	31.7 (89.1)	32.2 (90.0)	31.3 (88.3)	27.2 (81.0)	22.5 (72.5)	14.7 (58.5)	8.9 (48.0)	20.8 (69.4)
Daily mean °C (°F)	1.2 (34.2)	4.1 (39.4)	10.2 (50.4)	15.6 (60.1)	21.3 (70.3)	25.7 (78.3)	27.5 (81.5)	26.5 (79.7)	21.7 (71.1)	16.5 (61.7)	9.2 (48.6)	3.2 (37.8)	15.2 (59.4)
Mean daily minimum °C (°F)	−3.1 (26.4)	−0.2 (31.6)	5.1 (41.2)	9.8 (49.6)	15.8 (60.4)	20.6 (69.1)	23.7 (74.7)	22.8 (73.0)	17.7 (63.9)	11.9 (53.4)	4.9 (40.8)	−1.2 (29.8)	10.7 (51.2)
Record low °C (°F)	−14.0 (6.8)	−14.0 (6.8)	−9.7 (14.5)	−1.2 (29.8)	3.3 (37.9)	12.4 (54.3)	17.4 (63.3)	14.2 (57.6)	7.6 (45.7)	−0.1 (31.8)	−8.0 (17.6)	−14.3 (6.3)	−14.3 (6.3)
Average precipitation mm (inches)	19.3 (0.76)	21.6 (0.85)	36.1 (1.42)	41.3 (1.63)	78.4 (3.09)	115.4 (4.54)	170.9 (6.73)	141.4 (5.57)	70.2 (2.76)	50.8 (2.00)	37.4 (1.47)	17.1 (0.67)	799.9 (31.49)
Average precipitation days (≥ 0.1 mm)	4.8	5.8	6.4	6.3	8.3	7.8	11.8	11.1	8.6	6.7	6.3	4.5	88.4
Average snowy days	4.1	2.8	1.4	0	0	0	0	0	0	0	1.0	2.0	11.3
Average relative humidity (%)	68	67	67	69	70	69	80	83	78	71	71	69	72
Mean monthly sunshine hours	112.1	120.3	155.2	186.2	193.9	177.0	178.0	164.9	145.5	142.9	132.9	122.8	1,831.7
Percentage possible sunshine	35	38	42	48	45	41	41	40	40	41	43	40	41
Source: China Meteorological Administration
