= Daxin, Henan =

Daxin 大新镇
- Town
- Location in Henan
- Coordinates: 34°2′29″N 114°34′50″E
- Country: People's Republic of China
- Province: Henan
- Prefecture-level city: Zhoukou
- County: Fugou County
- Time zone: UTC+8 (China Standard)

Daxin (Chinese: 大新; pinyin: Dàxīn) is a town under the administration of Fugou County, Henan, China. As of 2020, it has 22 villages under its administration:

- Xinnan Village (新南村)
- Xinbei Village (新北村)
- Xulou Village (许楼村)
- Zhujia Village (祝家村)
- Nanwaliu Village (南洼刘村)
- Liufangyu Village (刘方宇村)
- Sihouliu Village (寺后刘村)
- Wawu Village (瓦屋村)
- Jianglao Village (姜老村)
- Jiangshaoye Village (姜绍业村)
- Chentang Village (陈堂村)
- Jiangguozhuang Village (姜郭庄村)
- Heyanliu Village (河沿刘村)
- Baidanggang Village (百党岗村)
- Sigang Village (寺岗村)
- Pojia Village (坡贾村)
- Zhengying Village (郑营村)
- Chenlou Village (陈楼村)
- Jiaxiaozhuang Village (贾小庄村)
- Yangzhuang Village (杨庄村)
- Huotang Village (霍堂村)
- Xuanxiling Village (轩西岭村)
