= Chen County =

Chen County (Chen Xian) may refer to:

- Huaiyang County, Henan, China, formerly Chen County (陈县)
- Chenzhou, Hunan, China, formerly Chen County (郴县)
