= Bailou, Zhoukou =

Bailou 白楼镇
- Town
- Location in Henan
- Coordinates: 33°46′48″N 114°52′36″E
- Country: People's Republic of China
- Province: Henan
- Prefecture-level city: Zhoukou
- District: Huaiyang District
- Time zone: UTC+8 (China Standard)

Bailou (simplified Chinese: 白楼; traditional Chinese: 白樓; pinyin: Báilóu) is a town in Huaiyang District, Zhoukou, Henan, China. As of 2020, it had 19 villages under its administration:

- Yuzhuang Village (于庄村)
- Gaolou Village (高楼村)
- Xulou Village (许楼村)
- Daxu Village (大徐村)
- Pangzhuang Village (庞庄村)
- Wugutai Village (五谷台村)
- Luanlou Village (栾楼村)
- Guolou Village (郭楼村)
- Lizhuang Village (黎庄村)
- Daliulou Village (大刘楼村)
- Xiaoxu Village (小徐村)
- Shawo Village (沙沃村)
- Laolou Village (劳楼村)
- Dasong Village (大宋村)
- Shamaoliu Village (沙卯刘村)
- Taohe Village (陶河村)
- Dahao Village (大郝村)
- Shenmiao Village (沈庙村)
- Dazheng Village (大郑村)

== See also ==
- List of township-level divisions of Henan
