= 1938 Yellow River flood =

Flood during Sino-Japanese War

A map of the flooded area in 1938

The 1938 Yellow River flood (simplified Chinese: 花园口决堤事件; traditional Chinese: 花園口決堤事件; pinyin: Huāyuánkǒu Juédī Shìjiàn; lit. 'Huayuankou Dam Burst Incident') was a man-made flood in China from June 1938 to January 1947 created by the intentional destruction of levees on the Yellow River in Huayuankou, Henan, by the National Revolutionary Army (NRA) during the Second Sino-Japanese War. The first wave of floods hit Zhongmu County on 13 June 1938.

NRA commanders intended the flood to act as a scorched earth defensive line against the Imperial Japanese Armed Forces. There were three long-term strategic intentions behind the decision to cause the flooding: firstly, the flood in Henan safeguarded the Guanzhong section of the Longhai railway, a major northwestern route used by the Soviet Union to send supplies to the NRA from August 1937 to March 1941. Secondly, the flooding of significant portions of land and railway sections made it difficult for the Japanese military to enter Shaanxi, thereby preventing them from invading the Sichuan basin, where the Chinese wartime capital of Chongqing and China's southwestern home front were located. Thirdly, the floods in Henan and Anhui destroyed much of the tracks and bridges of the Beijing–Wuhan railway, the Tianjin–Pukou railway and the Longhai railway, thereby preventing the Japanese from effectively moving their forces across Northern and Central China. In the short term, the NRA aimed to use the flood to halt the rapid transit of Japanese units from Northern China to areas near Wuhan.

The flood achieved the strategic intentions set by NRA commanders; in particular, the Japanese Operation 5 never captured Shaanxi, Sichuan or Chongqing. However, the flood came at enormous human cost, economic damages and environmental impact; in the immediate aftermath, 30,000 to 89,000 civilians drowned in the provinces of Henan, Anhui and Jiangsu, while a total of 400,000 to 500,000 civilians died from drowning, famine and plague. The Yellow River was diverted to a new course over swathes of farmland until the repair of the dikes in January 1947. Five million civilians lived on such inundated land until 1947. Inspired by the strategic outcome, dikes elsewhere in China, especially along the Yangtze, were subsequently destroyed by Chinese and Japanese forces alike.

== Destruction of dikes ==
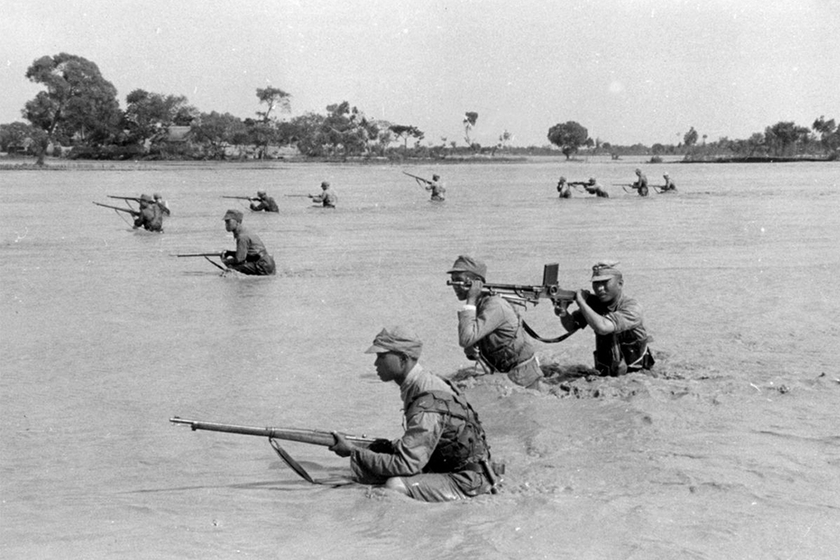
Soldiers of the National Revolutionary Army fighting in the flooded area of the Yellow River

The military history of China has seen several instances of deliberate human destruction of dikes. It was attested in 225 BC, AD 219, 918, 923, 1128, 1232, 1234, 1642 and 1926. In 1935, Alexander von Falkenhausen was commissioned by the Chinese to write a report on the strategic planning of the upcoming Sino-Japanese War. Falkenhausen's report recommended the use of a Yellow River flood and was adopted into the annual National Defense Strategy of 1937.

Many of the officers in the Chinese National Army were familiar to the use of flood as the warlord Wu Peifu used it against them in the 1926 Northern Expedition. The suggestion of the use of flood was floated among various officers throughout May 1938. On 1 June 1938 in a military meeting, the Commander-in-chief Chiang Kai-shek sanctioned to open up the dikes (levees) on the Yellow River near Zhengzhou. After the Chinese were defeated in the Battle of Xuzhou, the Zhengzhou junction of the Beijing–Wuhan Railway was within reach by the Japanese. The goal of the operation was to stop the advancing Japanese troops by following a strategy of "using water as a substitute for soldiers" (以水代兵, pinyin: Yǐshuǐ dàibīng). The Chinese National Army implemented the flood plan. The original plan was to use explosives to destroy the dike (levee) of Zhaokou, but due to difficulties at that location, the dike of Huayuankou, on the Yellow River's south bank, was destroyed on June 5 and June 7 via tunneling, with waters flooding into Henan, Anhui, and Jiangsu. The floods covered and destroyed thousands of square kilometers of farmland, and shifted the course of the Yellow River hundreds of kilometers to the south.

Attempts to seal the breach and return the river to its former course were made in 1946 by the KMT with assistance from UNRRA. Work began in March and was completed in June, but the dams were again destroyed by large summer flows. Subsequent repairs succeeded and were eventually completed in March 1947.

== Effect on the war ==
=== Long term ===
The flood had three long-term strategic intents.

Firstly, the flood in Henan safeguarded the Shaanxi section of the Longhai railway, the major northwest traffic where the Soviet Union sent their military supplies to the Chinese National Army from August 1937 to March 1941. Once the German arms export to the Chinese National Army stopped in April 1938, the Soviet Union became the biggest arms exporter to China until the United States joined.

Secondly, the inundated land across Henan and the flooded tracks of the Beijing–Wuhan Railway made it difficult for the Japanese Army to mobilize into Shaanxi. Throughout Chinese military history, Shaanxi is always the major path to Sichuan (known as Shudao in historiography) and the Japanese plan to enter the Sichuan basin was no different. Securing Sichuan was important since it was where the wartime capital of Chongqing and the southwestern home front were located.

Thirdly, the floods in Henan and Anhui crushed the tracks and bridges of the Beijing–Wuhan Railway, Tianjin–Pukou Railway and Longhai Railway. This prevented the Japanese Army from quickly mobilizing their machines and troops across the theaters of North, Central and Northwest China.

The flood achieved the above strategic intent along with casualties and damages. Believing that the civilians would help them, the Chinese Communists turned the flooded area into a recruiting ground, directing survivors' anger towards a common enemy to bring them into their ranks. By the 1940s the area had evolved into a major guerrilla base known as the Yuwansu Base Area.

=== Short term ===
Most of the flooded towns and transport lines had already been captured by the Japanese; after the flood, the Japanese could not consolidate their control over the area. In fact, large parts of it became guerrilla areas.

The flood bought time for the Battle of Wuhan. The flood stopped the Japanese Army from capturing the Zhengzhou junction of the Beijing–Wuhan Railway. Unintentionally, the flood also destroyed the Bengbu railway bridge of the Tianjin–Pukou Railway. The Japanese thus could not use either railway to send its troops and supplies.

== Damages ==
After the flooding, the Yellow River was diverted from its earlier course at Huayuankou, and flowed into the Jialu River in Zhongmu County. The new course led the Yellow River into the Shaying River at the city of Zhoujiakou (now Zhoukou), eventually joining the Huai River. Water overflowed from these smaller rivers, causing widespread destruction in the basin. According to a postwar report, floods inundated 32 percent of land and 45 percent of villages in 20 affected counties.

Besides the massive death toll, the flooded areas were affected for years to come. The flooded countryside was more or less abandoned and all the crops destroyed. Upon the recession of the waters, much of the ground was uncultivable as much of the soil was covered in silt. Many of the public structures and housing were also destroyed, leaving any survivors destitute. The irrigation channels were also ruined, further adding to the toll on the farmlands. The destruction also had a long-term psychological effect on the Chinese population.

The Nationalist government were slow to provide disaster relief.

== Casualties ==
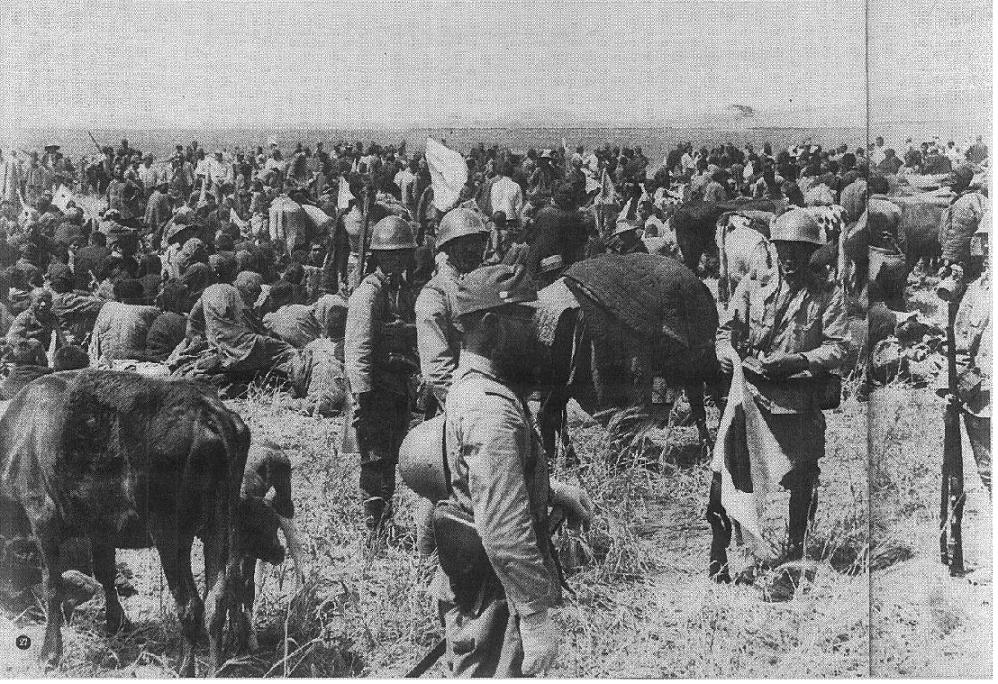
Japanese troops guarding Chinese refugees displaced by war and the Yellow River Flood, China Jun-Jul 1938

The immediate drowning deaths were estimated to range from 30,000 (Kuo Tai-chun, 2015) to 89,000 (China Academy of Sciences, 1995). Estimates of total deaths resulting from floods, famine and plague varied wildly. Two professional sources put it to between 400,000 and 500,000, according to Wang Zhibin (1986) and Bi Chunfu (1995), an editor at the Yellow River Conservancy Commission of the Ministry of Water Resources and a researcher at Second Historical Archives of China respectively. A much higher estimate of 893,303 total deaths given by the Nationalist government's relief statistics in 1948 was discredited for its unspecified methodology of body counting and its questionable approximation of the missing figure of Anhui province. The Nationalist government's relief statistics were even higher than two early communist estimates in the 1950s, which put the total deaths to 470,000 and 500,000 respectively. However, subsequent communist sources generally upheld the 893,303 figure to portray the Nationalist government as inhumane.

The figures of inundated land were exploited by Nationalist propaganda. Initially, the Nationalist government falsely claimed that the flood was caused by Japanese aerial bombing, hence the Nationalist initially claimed 12 million peasants living on inundated land to boost anti-Japanese public sentiment. Bi Chunfu (1995) estimated that five million peasants were living on the inundated land. Bi's figure was echoed by two early communist estimates in the 1950s, which estimated 6.1 million and 5 million respectively.

== See also ==
- 1938 Changsha Fire
- 1941 eastern Ukraine floods during WW2
- Destruction of the Kozarovychi Dam
- Destruction of the Kakhovka Dam
- List of disasters in China by death toll
- Military history of China
- Military history of Japan
- Military of the Republic of China
