= Xinqiao, Xiangcheng City =

Xinqiao 新桥镇
- Town
- Location in Henan
- Coordinates: 33°10′58″N 114°56′45″E
- Country: People's Republic of China
- Province: Henan
- Prefecture-level city: Zhoukou
- County-level city: Xiangcheng
- Elevation: 41 m (135 ft)
- Time zone: UTC+8 (China Standard)

Xinqiao (simplified Chinese: 新桥; traditional Chinese: 新橋; pinyin: Xīnqiáo; lit. 'new bridge') is a town under the administration of Xiangcheng City in southeastern Henan province, China, located less than 4 kilometres (2.5 mi) north with the border with Anhui and 28 km (17 mi) south of downtown Xiangcheng. As of 2011, it has 29 villages under its administration.

== See also ==
- List of township-level divisions of Henan
