= Xihua County =

Xihua 西华县 Sihwa
- County
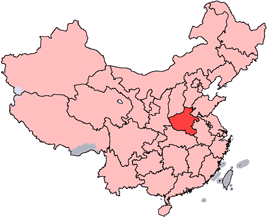
- Location of Henan Province
- Interactive map of Xihua
- Coordinates: 33°46′01″N 114°31′48″E
- Country: People's Republic of China
- Province: Henan
- Prefecture-level city: Zhoukou

Area
  - Total: 1,208 km^{2} (466 sq mi)

Population (2019)
  - Total: 737,000
  - Density: 610/km^{2} (1,580/sq mi)
- Time zone: UTC+8 (China Standard)
- Postal code: 466600

Xihua County (simplified Chinese: 西华县; traditional Chinese: 西華縣; pinyin: Xīhuá Xiàn) is a county in the east-central part of Henan province, China. It is under the administration of the prefecture-level city of Zhoukou.

== History ==
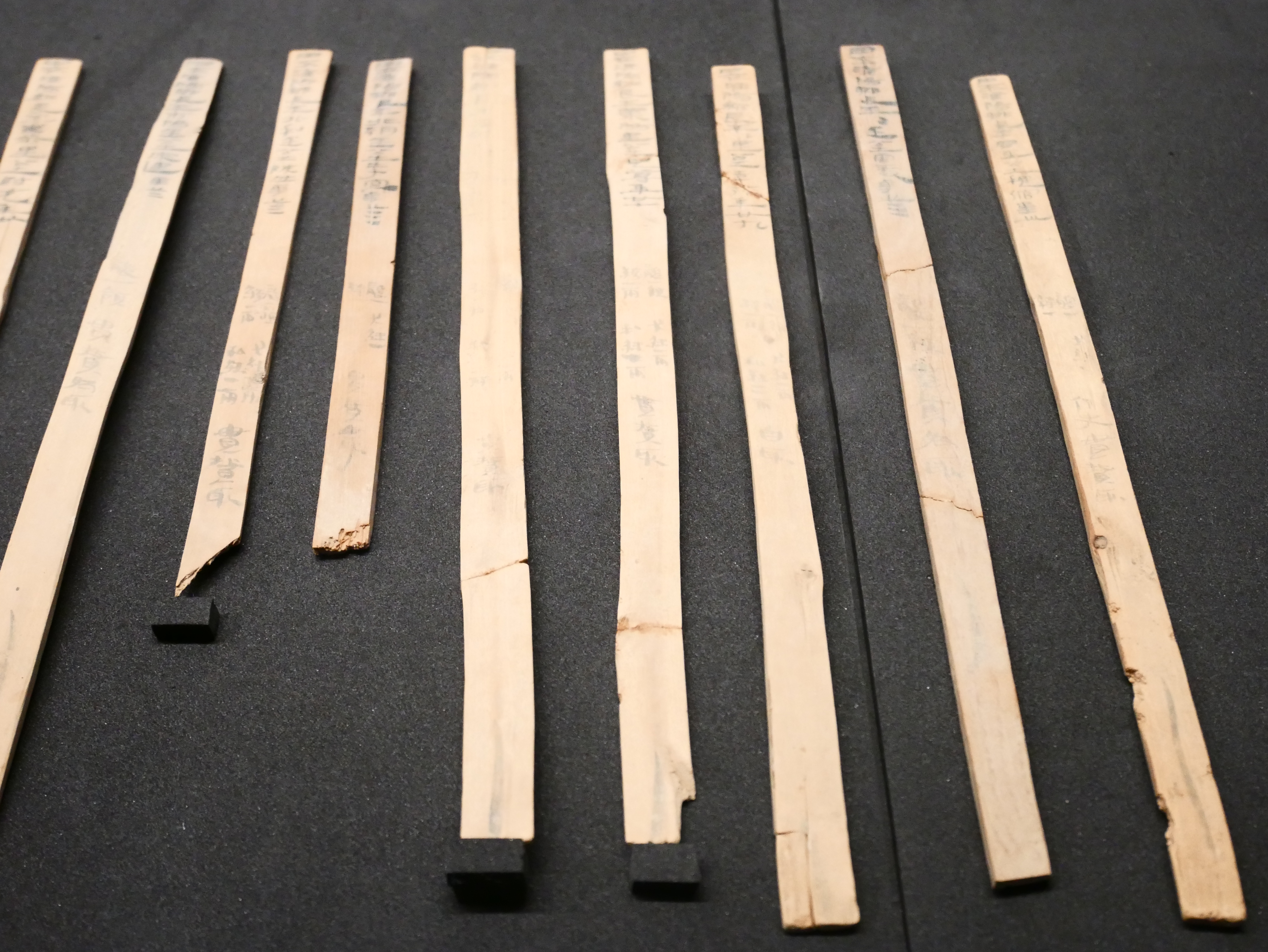
A register of field soldiers from Changping County, Huaiyang Commandery (modern-day Xihua County), excavated from the Dawancheng ruins

During the Spring and Autumn period, the northwest of present-day Changping (now part of Niehui Town) was home to the Hua clan of the State of Song. Those living in the east were known as Donghua ("East Hua"), while those in the west were called Xihua ("West Hua"), which is the origin of the name Xihua.

During the Qin dynasty, a settlement called Changping was established in the region, under the jurisdiction of Chen Commandery. In the Western Han dynasty, the area was divided into two counties—Xihua and Changping—under Runan Commandery of Yuzhou Inspectorate. In the Eastern Han dynasty, Xihua remained under Runan, while Changping became part of the Principality of Chen.

During the Three Kingdoms period, both counties were held by the state of Cao Wei, still under the administration of Runan and Chen commanderies, respectively. In the early Western Jin dynasty, the counties were abolished, but were restored in the first year of the Yongkang era of the reign of Emperor Hui of Jin (300 CE), both under Yingchuan Commandery.

In the Sixteen Kingdoms period, the region changed hands between Later Zhao, Former Yan, Former Qin, Eastern Jin, and Later Qin. During the Northern and Southern dynasties, the area was first controlled by Northern Wei and administered under Chen Commandery of Northern Yangzhou, then by Eastern Wei and Northern Qi. The county of Changping was abolished during the Northern Qi.

Under the Sui dynasty, Xihua County was part of Huaiyang Kingdom. In the 18th year of the Kaihuang era (598 CE), it was renamed Honggou County but reverted to Xihua early in the Daye era.

During the Tang dynasty, it was briefly renamed Jicheng at the beginning of the dynasty. In the first year of the Zhenguan era (627), it was merged into Wanqiu County. In the first year of the Changshou era (692), it was reestablished and renamed Wucheng. In the first year of Shenlong (705), the name was changed back to Jicheng, and in the first year of Jingyun (710), the historical name Xihua was restored. The county was administered under Chen Prefecture.

During the Northern Song dynasty, it remained under Chen Prefecture of Jingxibei Circuit. Under the Jin dynasty (1115–1234), it belonged to Chen Prefecture of the Nanjing Circuit. During the Yuan dynasty, it was part of Bianliang Circuit, Chen Prefecture. Under the Ming dynasty, it was placed under Kaifeng Prefecture, Chen Prefecture. This administrative structure remained in the early Qing dynasty. In the 12th year of the Yongzheng reign (1734), Chen Prefecture was elevated to a fu-level administrative division, and Xihua County fell under its jurisdiction.

During the Republic of China period, Xihua County was placed under the jurisdiction of Kaifeng Circuit in 1914, and later reassigned to the Seventh Administrative Inspectorate District of Henan Province in 1932.

After the establishment of the People's Republic of China in 1949, the county initially came under the administration of Huaiyang Prefecture. In January 1953, it was reassigned to Xuchang Prefecture, and in May 1965, it was transferred to Zhoukou Prefecture. In 1969, it became part of Zhoukou Region.

On June 8, 2000, Zhoukou Region was abolished and reorganized as the prefecture-level Zhoukou, with Xihua County under its jurisdiction to this day.

== Geography ==
Xihua County is located in the central part of the North China Plain, characterized by flat and low-lying terrain, with the southeast slightly lower than the northwest. The elevation ranges between 48 and 56 meters above sea level. After the 1938 Yellow River flood, the county became part of the heavily affected Yellow River flood zone.

The county has a dense network of rivers. There are 14 rivers with a drainage area exceeding 100 square kilometers. Major rivers include the Sha River, Ying River, and Jialu River, with respective lengths of 69 km, 65 km, and 33 km within county borders. All of these rivers are part of the Huai River system.

== Administrative divisions ==
As of 2012, this county is divided to 9 towns and 10 townships.

Towns

- Chengguan (城关镇)
- Xixiating (西夏亭镇)
- Xiaoyao (逍遥镇)
- Fengmu (奉母镇)
- Honghuaji (红花集镇)
- Niedui (聂堆镇)
- Dongxiating (东夏亭镇)
- Xihuaying (西华营镇)
- Zhifang (址坊镇)

Townships

- Tiankou Township (田口乡)
- Qingheyi Township (清河驿乡)
- Piying Township (皮营乡)
- Dongwangying Township (东王营乡)
- Dawangzhuang Township (大王庄乡)
- Lidazhuang Township (李大庄乡)
- Yebukou Township (叶埠口乡)
- Chiying Township (迟营乡)
- Huangtuqiao Township (黄土桥乡)
- Aigang Township (艾岗乡)

== Population ==
According to China's seventh national census, conducted on November 1, 2020, Xihua County had a permanent population of 692,846 residents.

== Transportation ==
Three expressways pass through Xihua County: G45 Daguang Expressway, G0424 Lankao–Nanyang Expressway, and S81 Zhengyang–Zhoukou Expressway. Each has interchanges located to the east, west, and south of the county seat, respectively.

In addition, several national and provincial highways also run through the area, including National Highways 230 and 344, as well as Provincial Roads 102, 213, 218, 321, 322, 323, and 324.

Rail transport is served by the Zhengzhou–Fuyang high-speed railway, which began operations in 2019. Xihua railway station is located just east of the county seat.

Xihua County is traversed by rivers such as the Ying River and the Sha River. During the Ming and Qing dynasties, these waterways facilitated convenient navigation. Xiaoyao Town was an important commercial port at the time, known as one of the four major ports along the Sha River, alongside Luohe, Zhoukou, and Jieshou.

With the development of land transportation, water transport gradually declined, especially after the late 1950s when numerous control gates were built along the lower reaches of the Sha and Ying rivers, causing navigation to cease. Starting from 2005, navigation was gradually restored section by section.

In April 2019, construction began on Xiaoyao Port on the northern bank of the Sha River in Xiaoyao Town. The port began trial operations in June 2022.

== Culture ==
=== Cuisine ===
Xiaoyao Town in Xihua County is famous for its Hulatang. On June 10, 2021, the technique of making Xiaoyao Hulatang was officially recognized as part of the fifth batch of China's National Intangible Cultural Heritage.

== Climate ==
Climate data for Xihua, elevation 52 m (171 ft), (1991–2020 normals, extremes 1981–present)
Month	Jan	Feb	Mar	Apr	May	Jun	Jul	Aug	Sep	Oct	Nov	Dec	Year
Record high °C (°F)	20.6 (69.1)	24.9 (76.8)	31.8 (89.2)	33.5 (92.3)	38.6 (101.5)	41.1 (106.0)	39.2 (102.6)	39.7 (103.5)	36.9 (98.4)	34.1 (93.4)	28.0 (82.4)	20.9 (69.6)	41.1 (106.0)
Mean daily maximum °C (°F)	6.1 (43.0)	9.9 (49.8)	15.4 (59.7)	21.8 (71.2)	27.2 (81.0)	31.8 (89.2)	32.2 (90.0)	30.8 (87.4)	27.2 (81.0)	22.2 (72.0)	14.7 (58.5)	8.2 (46.8)	20.6 (69.1)
Daily mean °C (°F)	1.2 (34.2)	4.5 (40.1)	9.8 (49.6)	15.8 (60.4)	21.3 (70.3)	25.9 (78.6)	27.5 (81.5)	26.3 (79.3)	21.8 (71.2)	16.1 (61.0)	9.1 (48.4)	3.2 (37.8)	15.2 (59.4)
Mean daily minimum °C (°F)	−2.3 (27.9)	0.5 (32.9)	5.3 (41.5)	10.7 (51.3)	16.1 (61.0)	20.9 (69.6)	23.8 (74.8)	22.9 (73.2)	17.8 (64.0)	11.7 (53.1)	5.1 (41.2)	−0.4 (31.3)	11.0 (51.8)
Record low °C (°F)	−15.5 (4.1)	−14.9 (5.2)	−8.7 (16.3)	−1.7 (28.9)	2.6 (36.7)	11.3 (52.3)	16.1 (61.0)	13.4 (56.1)	6.1 (43.0)	−1.7 (28.9)	−9.5 (14.9)	−17.4 (0.7)	−17.4 (0.7)
Average precipitation mm (inches)	17.1 (0.67)	18.6 (0.73)	32.5 (1.28)	43.9 (1.73)	71.9 (2.83)	94.2 (3.71)	204.1 (8.04)	136.2 (5.36)	74.4 (2.93)	44.5 (1.75)	35.0 (1.38)	15.9 (0.63)	788.3 (31.04)
Average precipitation days (≥ 0.1 mm)	4.7	5.3	6.2	6.1	8.2	8.0	11.8	10.8	8.5	6.7	6.2	4.2	86.7
Average snowy days	4.0	3.0	1.2	0	0	0	0	0	0	0	1.0	2.4	11.6
Average relative humidity (%)	67	65	64	67	68	68	80	82	77	71	70	67	71
Mean monthly sunshine hours	120.4	126.5	167.0	198.8	206.0	191.9	188.7	174.9	147.4	144.5	135.4	123.3	1,924.8
Percentage possible sunshine	38	41	45	51	48	45	43	43	40	42	44	40	43
Source: China Meteorological Administration all-time extreme temperature all-time January high
