= Chengbei Subdistrict, Zhoukou =

Chengbei Subdistrict 城北街道
- Subdistrict
- Location in Henan
- Coordinates: 33°39′01″N 114°39′06″E
- Country: People's Republic of China
- Province: Henan
- Prefecture-level city: Zhoukou
- District: Chuanhui
- Elevation: 51 m (167 ft)
- Time zone: UTC+8 (China Standard)

Chengbei Subdistrict (Chinese: 城北街道; pinyin: Chéngběi Jiēdào; lit. 'city north') is a subdistrict of Chuanhui District, Zhoukou, Henan, People's Republic of China, located in the northern outskirts of the Zhoukou's urban area as its name suggests. As of 2011, it has 15 residential communities (社区) under its administration.

== See also ==
- List of township-level divisions of Henan
