= Jialu River =

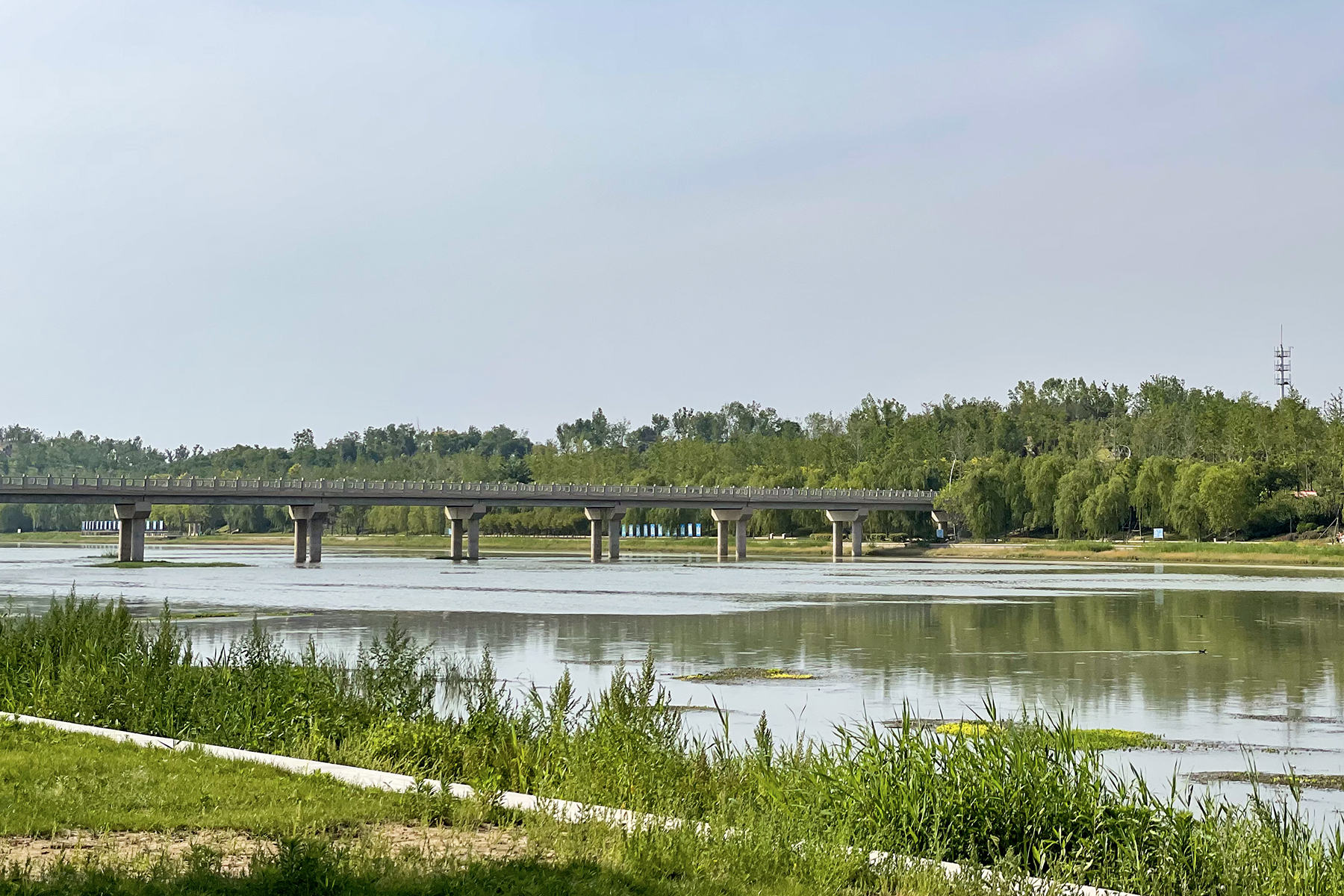
- Jialu River in Zhengzhou

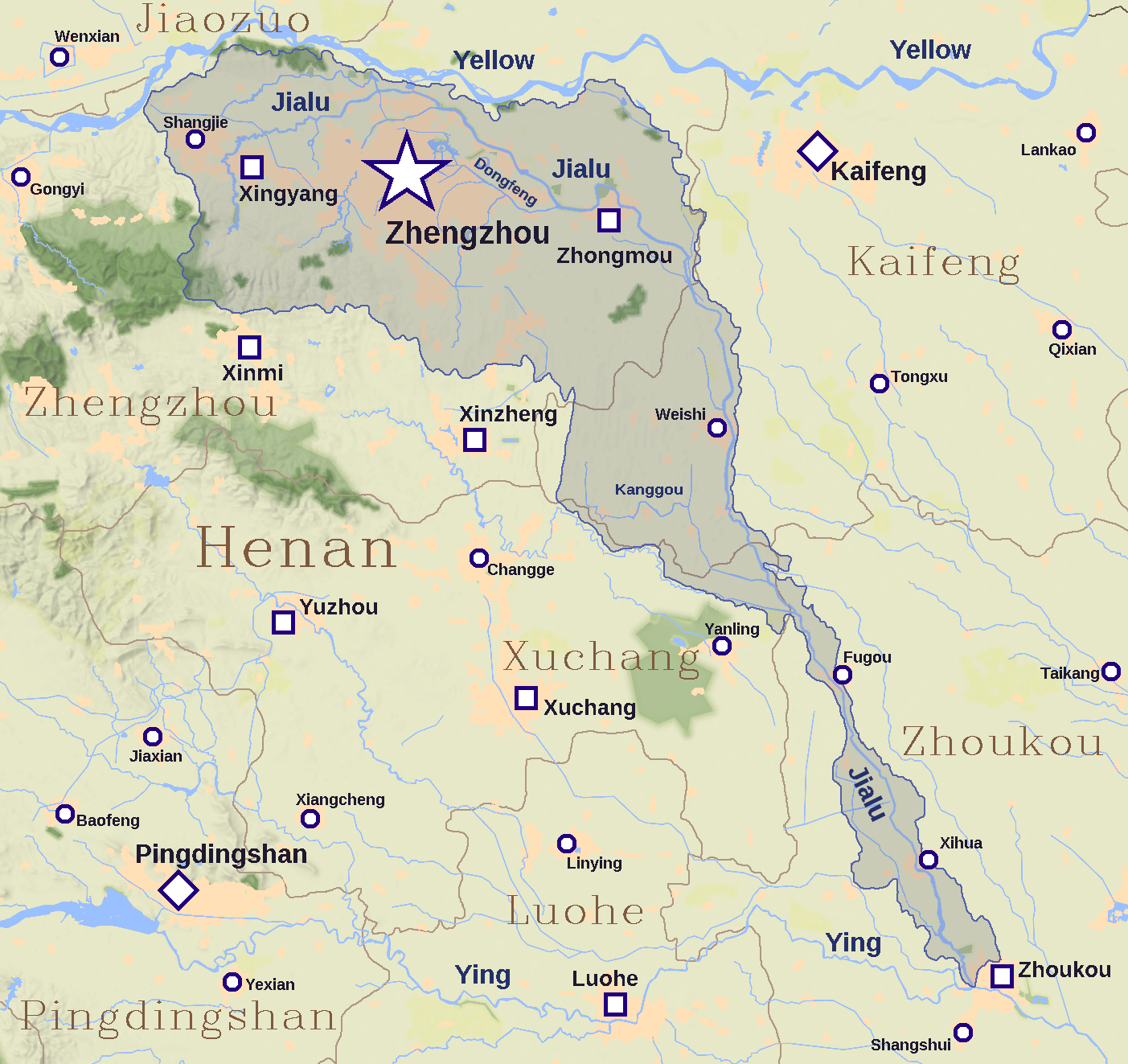
- Native name: 贾鲁河

Location
- Country: China
- Provinces: Henan
- Cities: Zhengzhou, Zhoukou

Physical characteristics
- Mouth
  - coordinates: 33.6292°N 114.6353°E
- Length: 256 km (159 mi)
- Basin size: 5,896 km^{2} (2,276 sq mi)

Basin features
- River system: Huai River

Jialu River (Chinese: 贾鲁河) is a river in Henan, China. It originates in Xinmi, and flows northeast to Zhengzhou. From there, it flows southeast and passes through Weishi, Fugou and Xihua counties, eventually joining the Ying River, the largest tributary of the Huai River, at Zhoukou.

Much of Jialu River's course is artificially created. Parts of the river overlap with the Hong Canal (Chinese: 鸿沟) of the Spring and Autumn and Warring States periods, which linked the Yellow River basin to the Huai River basin. During Sui, Tang and Song dynasties, it formed part of the Grand Canal, and was vital for transporting food to the empire's capitals. This stretch of the canal was abandoned in late Northern Song period due to excessive silting from the Yellow River.

In late Yuan dynasty, the government conducted a series of major hydrological projects in the area in response to serious flooding of the Yellow River. The old canal was dredged and served as a channel for the flood water to flow into the Huai. The river was named after Jia Lu (贾鲁), chief engineer of the project.

In 1938, a man-made flood diverted the Yellow River to Jialu River. The Yellow River followed this course to the Yellow Sea until 1946.

In recent years, the river is severely polluted by sewage emissions.
