= Taió =

- Municipality
- Flag Coat of arms

- Location of Taió

- Location in Brazil
- Country: Brazil
- Region: South
- State: Santa Catarina
- Mesoregion: Vale do Itajai

Government
  - Mayor: Almir Reni Guski

Area
  - Total: 268.186 sq mi (694.599 km^{2})
- Elevation: 1,178 ft (359 m)

Population (2020)
  - Total: 18,486
  - Density: 68.930/sq mi (26.614/km^{2})
- Time zone: UTC -3
- Website: www.taio.sc.gov.br

Taió is a municipality in the state of Santa Catarina in the South region of Brazil.

== Sister City ==
- Zhoukou, Henan, China

== See also ==
- List of municipalities in Santa Catarina
