= Shenqiu County =

Shenqiu 沈丘县 Shenkiu
- County
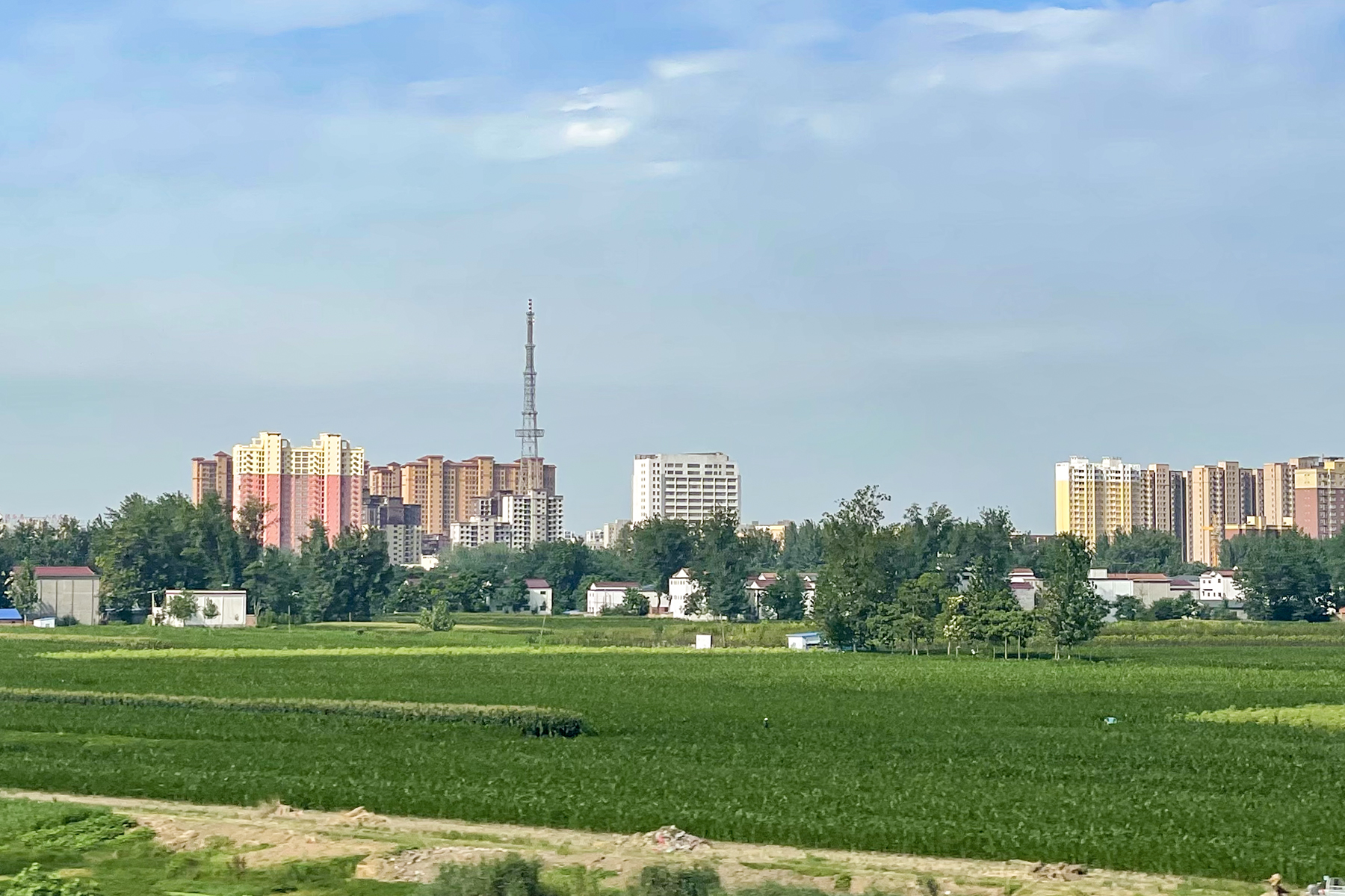
- View of Shenqiu County

- Location of the seat in Henan
- Coordinates: 33°24′32″N 115°05′56″E
- Country: People's Republic of China
- Province: Henan
- Prefecture-level city: Zhoukou

Area
  - Total: 1,082 km^{2} (418 sq mi)

Population (2019)
  - Total: 933,000
  - Density: 862/km^{2} (2,230/sq mi)
- Time zone: UTC+8 (China Standard)
- Postal code: 466300

Shenqiu County (Chinese: 沈丘县; pinyin: Shěnqiū Xiàn) is a county in the east of Henan province, China, bordering Anhui province to the south and east. It is under the administration of Zhoukou City. The county seat is the town of Shenqiu, which is situated on the Ying River, a tributary of the Huai River. This river traverses the county from Zhoukou in the west to the Henan state border with Anhui in the east at Jieshou.

The county includes the two streets, 10 towns, and 10 townships. Population is made up of nine (Han, Hui, Manchu, Mongolian, Tibetan, Zhuang, Daur) ethnic groups. Han ethnic group is the largest comprising more than 956,000 Han.

== Administrative divisions ==
As of 2012, this county is divided to 2 subdistricts, 9 towns, 1 ethnic town and 10 townships.

Subdistricts

- Dongcheng Subdistrict (东城街道)
- Beicheng Subdistrict (北城街道)

Towns

- Liuzhuangdian (刘庄店镇)
- Liufuji (留福集镇)
- Laocheng (老城镇)
- Zhaodeying (赵德营镇)
- Fujing (付井镇)
- Zhidian (纸店镇)
- Xin’anji (新安集镇)
- Baiji (白集镇)
- Liuwan (刘湾镇)

Ethnic Towns

- Huaidian Hui Town (槐店回族镇)

Townships

- Lianchi Township (连池乡)
- Shicaoji Township (石槽集乡)
- Fanying Township (范营乡)
- Lilaozhuang Township (李老庄乡)
- Daqiuzhuang Township (大邢庄乡)
- Fengying Township (冯营乡)
- Zhouying Township (周营乡)
- Hongshan Township (洪山乡)
- Beiyangji Township (北杨集乡)
- Bianlukou Township (卞路口乡)

== Climate ==
Climate data for Shenqiu, elevation 41 m (135 ft), (1991–2020 normals, extremes 1981–2010)
Month	Jan	Feb	Mar	Apr	May	Jun	Jul	Aug	Sep	Oct	Nov	Dec	Year
Record high °C (°F)	18.9 (66.0)	25.7 (78.3)	27.6 (81.7)	31.9 (89.4)	37.2 (99.0)	40.2 (104.4)	41.4 (106.5)	39.1 (102.4)	37.4 (99.3)	35.1 (95.2)	28.6 (83.5)	21.0 (69.8)	41.4 (106.5)
Mean daily maximum °C (°F)	6.5 (43.7)	10.0 (50.0)	15.2 (59.4)	21.5 (70.7)	27.1 (80.8)	31.9 (89.4)	32.4 (90.3)	31.2 (88.2)	27.8 (82.0)	22.7 (72.9)	15.1 (59.2)	8.6 (47.5)	20.8 (69.5)
Daily mean °C (°F)	1.3 (34.3)	4.5 (40.1)	9.5 (49.1)	15.6 (60.1)	21.0 (69.8)	25.9 (78.6)	27.7 (81.9)	26.4 (79.5)	22.0 (71.6)	16.5 (61.7)	9.4 (48.9)	3.3 (37.9)	15.3 (59.5)
Mean daily minimum °C (°F)	−2.5 (27.5)	0.2 (32.4)	4.7 (40.5)	10.2 (50.4)	15.7 (60.3)	20.9 (69.6)	23.9 (75.0)	22.8 (73.0)	17.8 (64.0)	11.9 (53.4)	5.2 (41.4)	−0.6 (30.9)	10.9 (51.5)
Record low °C (°F)	−13.5 (7.7)	−13.5 (7.7)	−6.5 (20.3)	−0.9 (30.4)	3.9 (39.0)	11.9 (53.4)	17.1 (62.8)	13.1 (55.6)	7.5 (45.5)	0.4 (32.7)	−7.8 (18.0)	−16.0 (3.2)	−16.0 (3.2)
Average precipitation mm (inches)	20.8 (0.82)	21.6 (0.85)	38.2 (1.50)	45.3 (1.78)	76.3 (3.00)	128.4 (5.06)	165.2 (6.50)	132.7 (5.22)	74.0 (2.91)	52.9 (2.08)	38.2 (1.50)	17.9 (0.70)	811.5 (31.92)
Average precipitation days (≥ 0.1 mm)	5.0	5.8	6.4	6.5	8.7	7.9	11.4	11.0	8.4	7.2	6.5	4.7	89.5
Average snowy days	4.1	2.6	1.2	0.1	0	0	0	0	0	0	0.8	1.9	10.7
Average relative humidity (%)	71	69	70	73	73	70	81	84	79	73	73	71	74
Mean monthly sunshine hours	121.7	125.2	161.0	192.4	198.6	180.0	186.5	170.0	150.5	152.8	138.6	128.7	1,906
Percentage possible sunshine	38	40	43	49	46	42	43	41	41	44	45	42	43
Source: China Meteorological Administration
