= Dancheng County =

Dancheng 郸城县
- County
- Location of the seat in Henan
- Country: People's Republic of China
- Province: Henan
- Prefecture-level city: Zhoukou

Area
  - Total: 1,490 km^{2} (580 sq mi)

Population (2019)
  - Total: 957,000
  - Density: 642/km^{2} (1,660/sq mi)
- Time zone: UTC+8 (China Standard)
- Postal code: 477150

Dancheng County (simplified Chinese: 郸城县; traditional Chinese: 鄲城縣; pinyin: Dānchéng Xiàn) is a county in eastern Henan province, China. It is under the administration of Zhoukou city.

== Administrative divisions ==
As of 2012, this county is divided to 9 towns and 11 townships.

Towns

- Chengguan (城关镇)
- Wutai (吴台镇)
- Nanfeng (南丰镇)
- Baima (白马镇)
- Ningping (宁平镇)
- Yilu (宜路镇)
- Qiandian (钱店镇)
- Jizhong (汲冢镇)
- Shicao (石槽镇)

Townships

- Chengjiao Township (城郊乡)
- Hutougang Township (虎头岗乡)
- Jishui Township (汲水乡)
- Zhangwanji Township (张完集乡)
- Dingcun Township (丁村乡)
- Shuanglou Township (双楼乡)
- Qiuqu Township (秋渠乡)
- Dongfeng Township (东风乡)
- Baji Township (巴集乡)
- Lilou Township (李楼乡)
- Huji Township (胡集乡)

== Climate ==
Climate data for Dancheng, elevation 42 m (138 ft), (1991–2020 normals, extremes 1981–present)
Month	Jan	Feb	Mar	Apr	May	Jun	Jul	Aug	Sep	Oct	Nov	Dec	Year
Record high °C (°F)	18.8 (65.8)	26.4 (79.5)	32.5 (90.5)	33.7 (92.7)	38.6 (101.5)	40.6 (105.1)	41.2 (106.2)	39.8 (103.6)	37.6 (99.7)	35.1 (95.2)	28.7 (83.7)	21.0 (69.8)	41.2 (106.2)
Mean daily maximum °C (°F)	6.3 (43.3)	10.0 (50.0)	15.4 (59.7)	21.9 (71.4)	27.3 (81.1)	32.0 (89.6)	32.6 (90.7)	31.1 (88.0)	27.6 (81.7)	22.5 (72.5)	14.9 (58.8)	8.4 (47.1)	20.8 (69.5)
Daily mean °C (°F)	1.5 (34.7)	4.7 (40.5)	9.9 (49.8)	16.1 (61.0)	21.5 (70.7)	26.2 (79.2)	27.9 (82.2)	26.6 (79.9)	22.3 (72.1)	16.8 (62.2)	9.7 (49.5)	3.5 (38.3)	15.6 (60.0)
Mean daily minimum °C (°F)	−2.2 (28.0)	0.6 (33.1)	5.3 (41.5)	10.9 (51.6)	16.3 (61.3)	21.3 (70.3)	24.1 (75.4)	23.0 (73.4)	18.1 (64.6)	12.3 (54.1)	5.6 (42.1)	−0.1 (31.8)	11.3 (52.3)
Record low °C (°F)	−14.2 (6.4)	−13.5 (7.7)	−8.2 (17.2)	−2.3 (27.9)	3.9 (39.0)	11.6 (52.9)	17.0 (62.6)	13.1 (55.6)	6.4 (43.5)	−1.1 (30.0)	−7.9 (17.8)	−17.6 (0.3)	−17.6 (0.3)
Average precipitation mm (inches)	16.9 (0.67)	20.8 (0.82)	33.8 (1.33)	48.5 (1.91)	69.6 (2.74)	106.9 (4.21)	171.0 (6.73)	141.0 (5.55)	66.7 (2.63)	47.9 (1.89)	38.5 (1.52)	17.3 (0.68)	778.9 (30.68)
Average precipitation days (≥ 0.1 mm)	4.7	5.1	6.2	5.9	8.1	7.4	10.8	10.8	8.4	6.2	6.1	4.6	84.3
Average snowy days	3.8	2.6	1.0	0.1	0	0	0	0	0	0	0.7	1.8	10
Average relative humidity (%)	67	66	65	67	68	67	78	82	76	69	69	67	70
Mean monthly sunshine hours	129.3	133.7	172.9	203.7	212.2	200.4	197.0	180.4	162.0	160.1	145.4	136.9	2,034
Percentage possible sunshine	41	43	46	52	49	47	45	44	44	46	47	45	46
Source: China Meteorological Administration
