= Fugou County =

Fugou 扶沟县 Fu-kou
- County
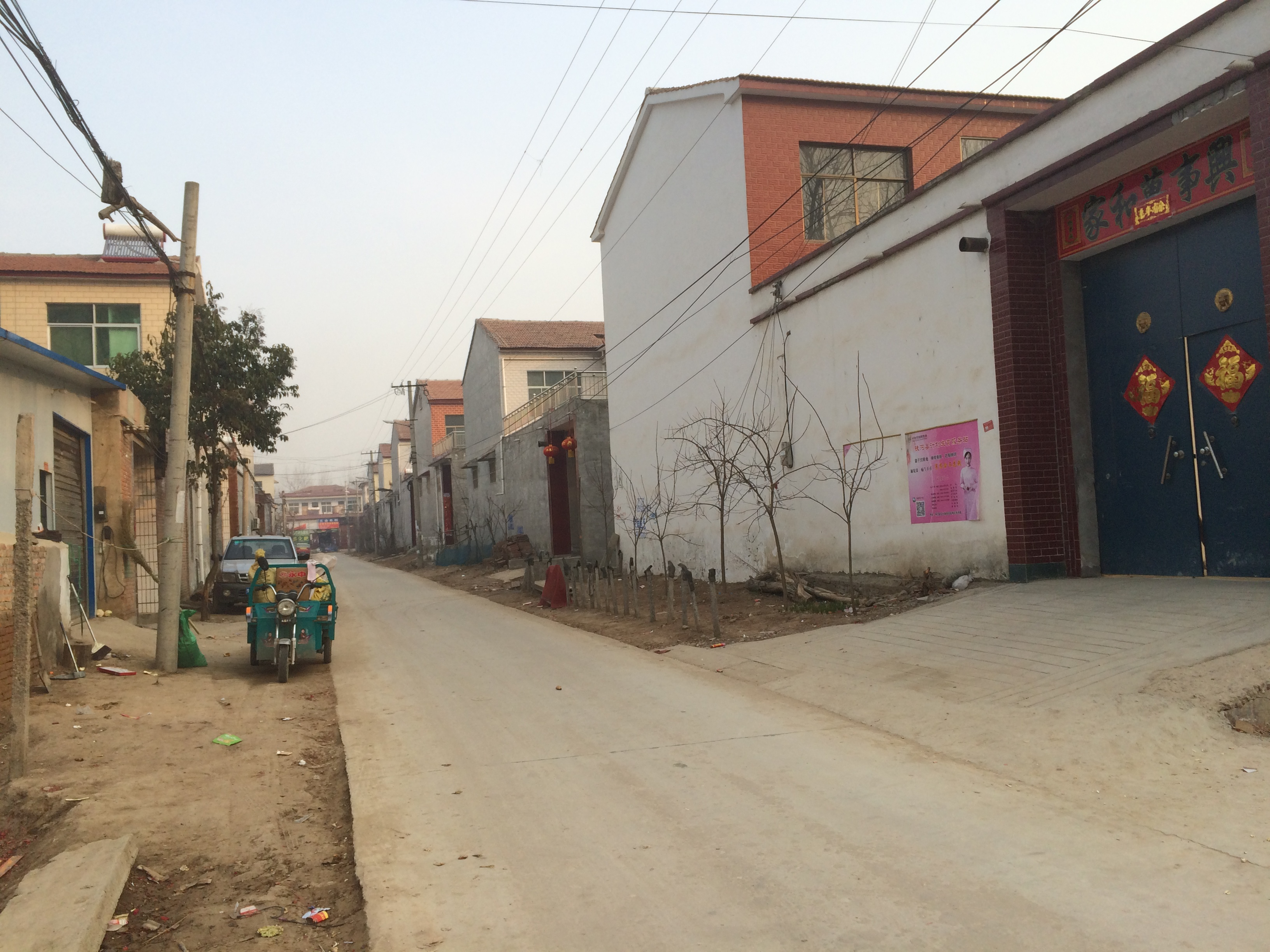

- Location of the seat in Henan
- Coordinates: 34.0600°N 114.3948°E
- Country: People's Republic of China
- Province: Henan
- Prefecture-level city: Zhoukou

Area
  - Total: 1,163 km^{2} (449 sq mi)

Population (2019)
  - Total: 589,500
  - Density: 506.9/km^{2} (1,313/sq mi)
- Time zone: UTC+8 (China Standard)
- Postal code: 461300

Fugou County (simplified Chinese: 扶沟县; traditional Chinese: 扶溝縣; pinyin: Fúgōu Xiàn) is a county of east-central Henan province, China. It is under the administration of Zhoukou city.

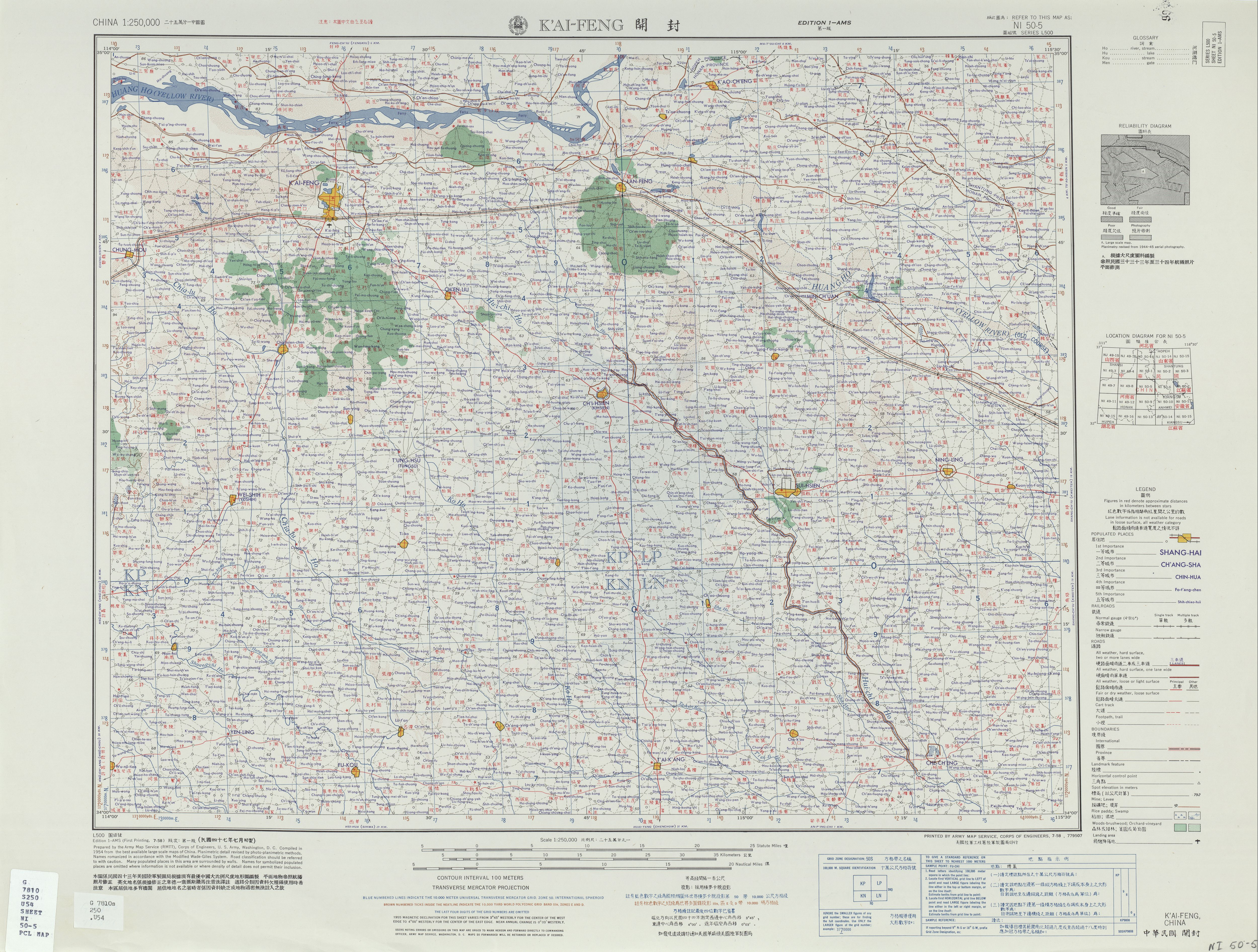
Map including Fugou (labeled as FU-KOU 扶溝) (1954)

== Administrative divisions ==
As of 2012, this county is divided to 9 towns and 6 townships.

=== Towns ===
- Chengguan (城关镇)
- Cuiqiao (崔桥镇)
- Jiangcun (江村镇)
- Baitan (白潭镇)
- Jiuyuan (韭园镇)
- Liansi (练寺镇)
- Daxin (大新镇)
- Baotun (包屯镇)
- Biangang (汴岗镇)

=== Townships ===
- Caoli Township (曹里乡)
- Chaigang Township (柴岗乡)
- Gucheng Township (固城乡)
- Lütan Township (吕潭乡)
- Dalizhuang Township (大李庄乡)
- Chengjiao Township (城郊乡)

== Climate ==
Climate data for Fugou, elevation 58 m (190 ft), (1991–2020 normals, extremes 1981–2010)
Month	Jan	Feb	Mar	Apr	May	Jun	Jul	Aug	Sep	Oct	Nov	Dec	Year
Record high °C (°F)	18.7 (65.7)	24.5 (76.1)	27.8 (82.0)	32.9 (91.2)	38.8 (101.8)	39.9 (103.8)	40.0 (104.0)	37.5 (99.5)	35.9 (96.6)	34.2 (93.6)	27.5 (81.5)	21.0 (69.8)	40.0 (104.0)
Mean daily maximum °C (°F)	5.8 (42.4)	9.6 (49.3)	15.2 (59.4)	21.3 (70.3)	26.8 (80.2)	31.8 (89.2)	31.9 (89.4)	30.4 (86.7)	26.9 (80.4)	22.0 (71.6)	14.3 (57.7)	7.8 (46.0)	20.3 (68.6)
Daily mean °C (°F)	0.5 (32.9)	3.8 (38.8)	9.2 (48.6)	15.2 (59.4)	20.8 (69.4)	25.7 (78.3)	27.2 (81.0)	25.6 (78.1)	21.0 (69.8)	15.5 (59.9)	8.5 (47.3)	2.5 (36.5)	14.6 (58.3)
Mean daily minimum °C (°F)	−3.4 (25.9)	−0.6 (30.9)	3.9 (39.0)	9.5 (49.1)	15.1 (59.2)	20.1 (68.2)	23.2 (73.8)	22.0 (71.6)	16.6 (61.9)	10.5 (50.9)	4.0 (39.2)	−1.4 (29.5)	10.0 (49.9)
Record low °C (°F)	−15.6 (3.9)	−15.7 (3.7)	−10.0 (14.0)	−2.4 (27.7)	3.9 (39.0)	10.7 (51.3)	16.5 (61.7)	11.8 (53.2)	5.3 (41.5)	−1.5 (29.3)	−15.1 (4.8)	−15.4 (4.3)	−15.7 (3.7)
Average precipitation mm (inches)	12.6 (0.50)	15.3 (0.60)	27.8 (1.09)	39.4 (1.55)	69.1 (2.72)	92.2 (3.63)	184.8 (7.28)	135.6 (5.34)	80.7 (3.18)	41.7 (1.64)	32.5 (1.28)	11.8 (0.46)	743.5 (29.27)
Average precipitation days (≥ 0.1 mm)	4.1	4.5	5.6	6.1	7.9	7.5	11.0	10.5	8.6	6.1	5.9	3.8	81.6
Average snowy days	3.6	2.7	1.0	0.1	0	0	0	0	0	0	1.0	2.1	10.5
Average relative humidity (%)	68	67	67	71	71	68	82	86	81	74	72	69	73
Mean monthly sunshine hours	110.4	124.1	162.9	186.1	196.7	178.7	166.3	151.6	147.3	144.6	129.2	118.8	1,816.7
Percentage possible sunshine	35	40	44	47	45	42	38	37	40	42	42	39	41
Source: China Meteorological Administration

== Notable people ==
- Shuping Wang
