= Huaiyang, Zhoukou =

Huaiyang 淮阳区 Hwaiyang
- District
- Location of the seat in Henan
- Coordinates: 33°43′59″N 114°51′00″E
- Country: People's Republic of China
- Province: Henan
- Prefecture-level city: Zhoukou

Area
  - Total: 1,321 km^{2} (510 sq mi)

Population (2019)
  - Total: 976,500
  - Density: 739.2/km^{2} (1,915/sq mi)
- Time zone: UTC+8 (China Standard)
- Postal code: 466700
- Website: www.huaiyang.gov.cn

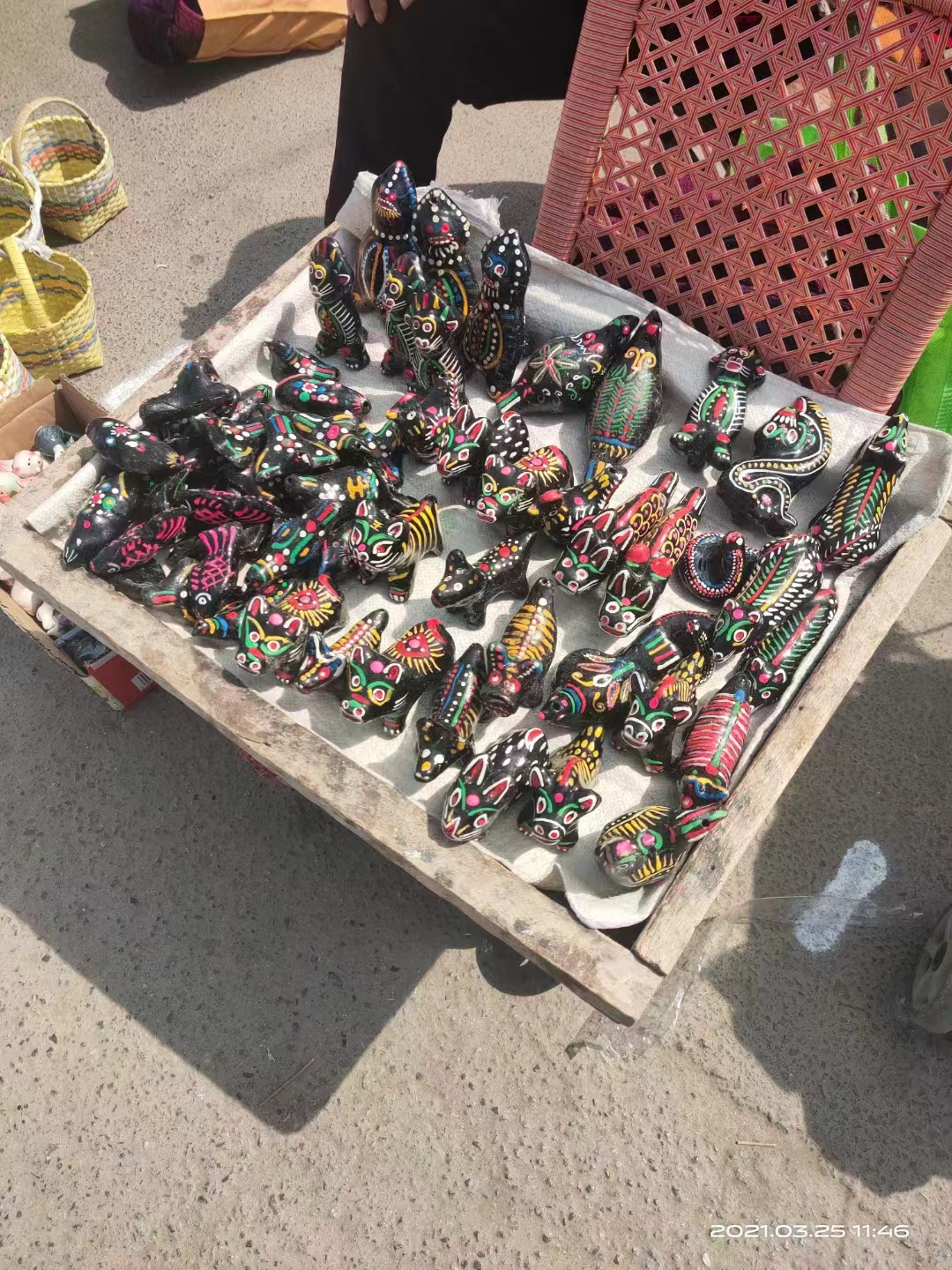
One of the national intangible cultural heritage - Ni Ni Dog

Huaiyang District (Chinese: 淮阳区; pinyin: Huáiyáng qū) is a district in the prefecture-level city of Zhoukou in the east of Henan province, People's Republic of China. It is located in the southeastern part of Henan Province and the central part of Zhoukou City. The district is situated in a warm temperate monsoon climate zone with abundant rainfall and distinct four seasons. It covers a total area of approximately 1334.56 square kilometers.

Huaiyang District has a rich historical and cultural heritage. In ancient times, it was known as Wanqiu, Chen, and even Chen State. During the Qin Dynasty, it was assigned to Chen Commandery. As time passed, in the early Western Han Dynasty, due to its location north of the Huai River, Chen Commandery was reorganized into Huaiyang Commandery, which was soon upgraded to the status of Huaiyang State. With the changes of dynasties, during the Northern Zhou Dynasty, it was renamed Chenzhou, marking the beginning of Chenzhou's history. During the Song Dynasty, in the Xuanhe era, Chenzhou was elevated to Huaining Prefecture. However, during the Jin Dynasty, it was restored to Chenzhou. In the Yongzheng period of the Qing Dynasty, Chenzhou was again upgraded to Chenzhou Prefecture, with Huaining County established. At the beginning of the Republic of China, Huaining County was renamed Huaiyang County. In the early days of the People's Republic of China, the Huaiyang Commissioner's Office was established, but it was abolished in 1953. However, in December 2019, Huaiyang County was officially abolished and reorganized into Huaiyang District, becoming a new administrative division.

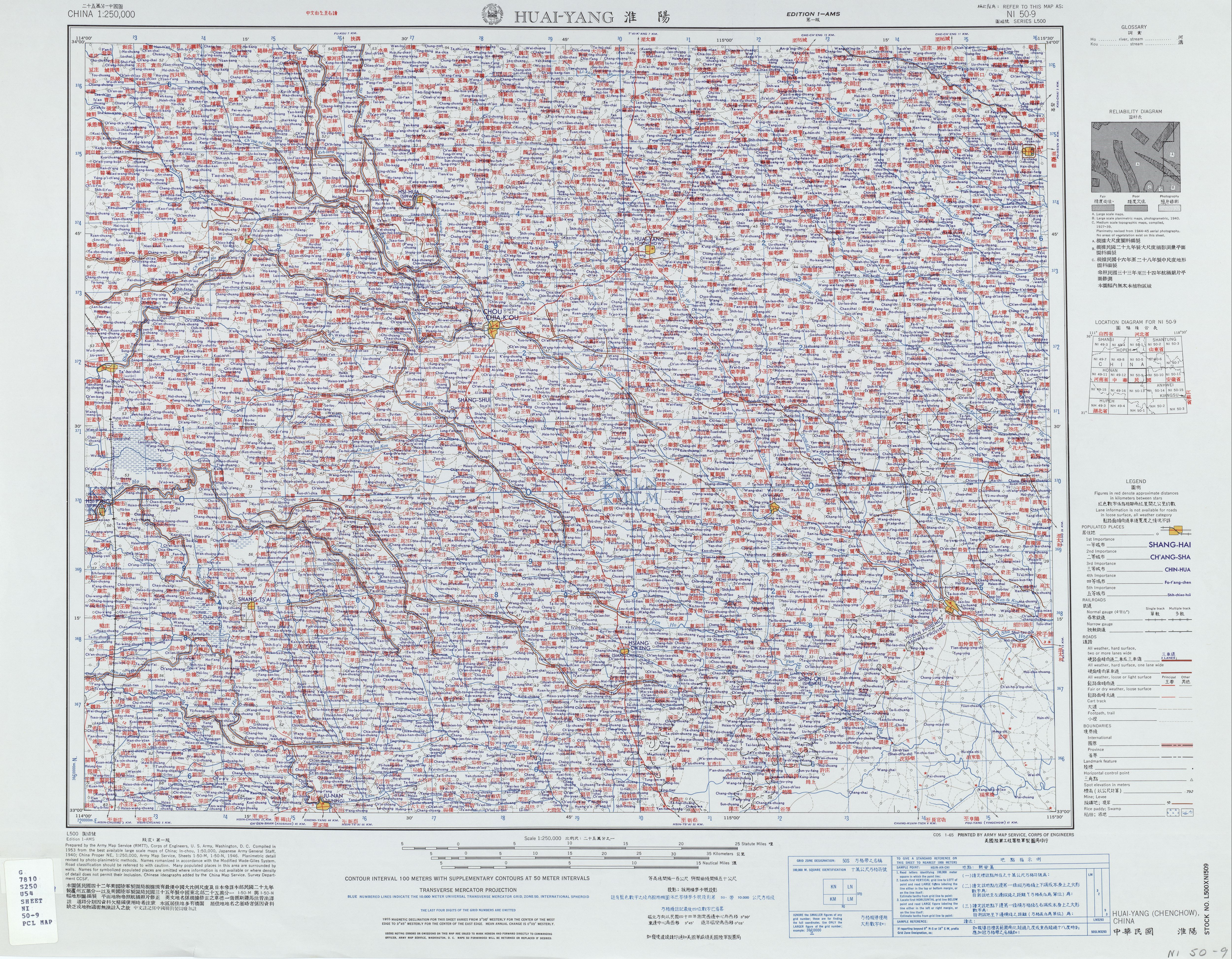
Map including Huaiyang (labeled as HUAI-YANG (CHENCHOW) 淮陽) (AMS, 1953)

The Chinese Ma clique General Ma Biao led Hui forces to annihilate the Japanese at the Battle of Huaiyang.

== Administrative divisions ==
As of 2012, this district is divided to 6 towns and 13 townships.

=== Towns ===
- Chengguan (城关镇)
- Xinzhan (新站镇)
- Lutai (鲁台镇)
- Sitong (四通镇)
- Lincai (临蔡镇)
- Anling (安岭镇)

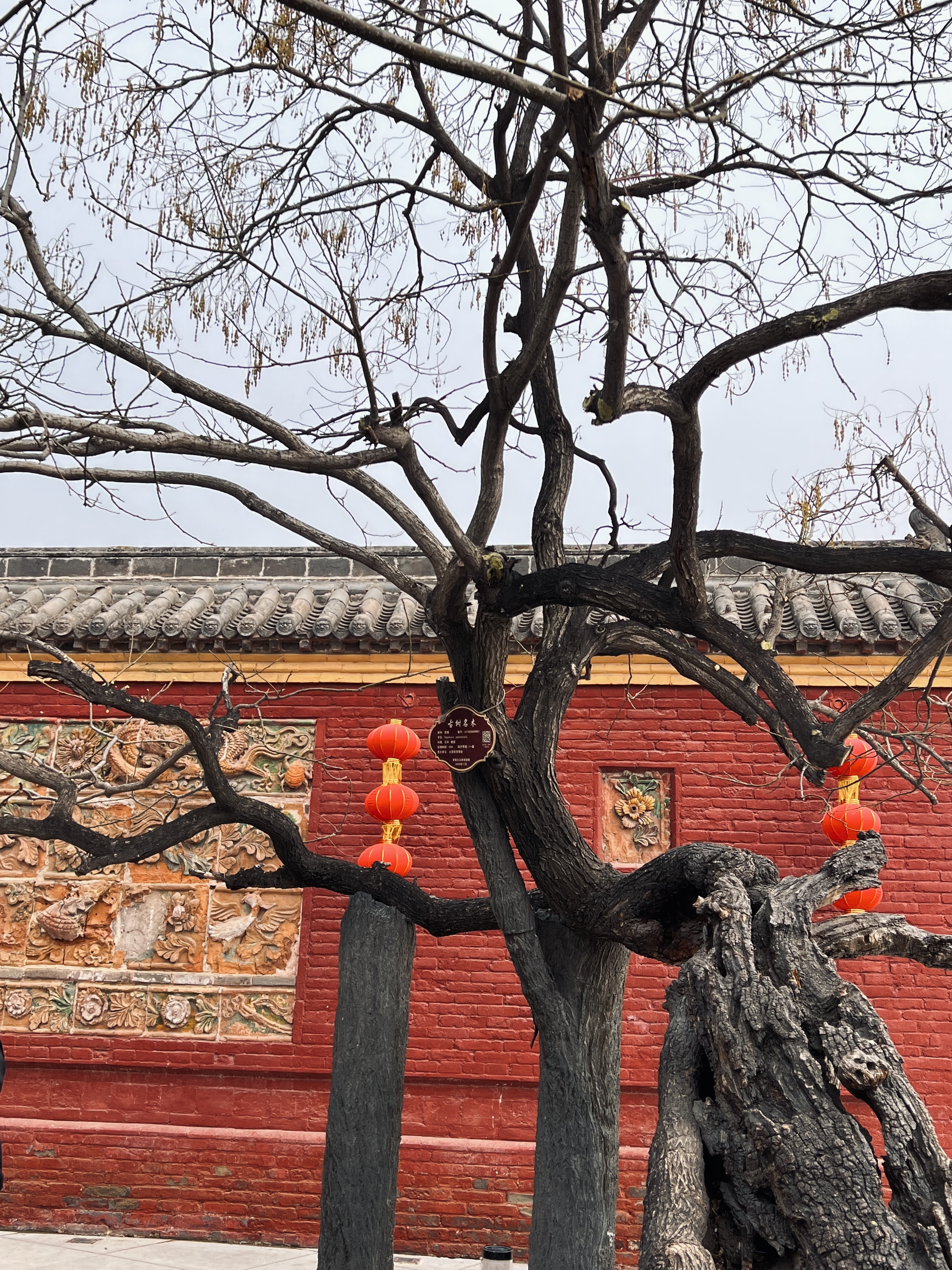
The Taihao Ling Temple Fair is one of the more grand temple fairs in China.Every time this happens, thousands of people gather here.

Famous tourist attractions: Taihaoling (太昊陵), Longhu Lake (龙湖), Huaiyang Pingliangtai City Site (淮阳平粮台城址).

Townships

- Zhuji Township (朱集乡)
- Doumen Township (豆门乡)
- Fengtang Township (冯塘乡)
- Liuzhentun Township (刘振屯乡)
- Wangdian Township (王店乡)
- Dalian Township (大连乡)
- Gedian Township (葛店乡)
- Huangji Township (黄集乡)
- Bailou Township (白楼乡)
- Qilao Township (齐老乡)
- Zhengji Township (郑集乡)
- Caohe Township (曹河乡)
- Xuwan Township (许湾乡)

== Culture ==
- Ni Ni Dog

"The Ni Ni Dog," also known as "Ling Dog," is a type of clay toy unique to Huaiyang District, Henan Province, China. According to legend, it is a divine dog tasked with guarding the tomb of Fuxi and Nuwa, revered figures in Chinese mythology, thus holding a sacred status in the local culture. This traditional art form carries ancient worship and beliefs, considered as a "living fossil" of Chinese primitive society.

== Climate ==
Climate data for Huaiyang District, elevation 44 m (144 ft), (1991–2020 normals, extremes 1981–present)
Month	Jan	Feb	Mar	Apr	May	Jun	Jul	Aug	Sep	Oct	Nov	Dec	Year
Record high °C (°F)	19.1 (66.4)	26.6 (79.9)	31.9 (89.4)	33.3 (91.9)	38.5 (101.3)	40.2 (104.4)	40.5 (104.9)	39.4 (102.9)	36.8 (98.2)	34.9 (94.8)	28.3 (82.9)	21.5 (70.7)	40.5 (104.9)
Mean daily maximum °C (°F)	6.3 (43.3)	10.1 (50.2)	15.6 (60.1)	22.1 (71.8)	27.4 (81.3)	32.1 (89.8)	32.6 (90.7)	31.3 (88.3)	27.6 (81.7)	22.5 (72.5)	15.0 (59.0)	8.4 (47.1)	20.9 (69.7)
Daily mean °C (°F)	1.4 (34.5)	4.7 (40.5)	9.9 (49.8)	16.1 (61.0)	21.6 (70.9)	26.3 (79.3)	27.9 (82.2)	26.6 (79.9)	22.1 (71.8)	16.6 (61.9)	9.5 (49.1)	3.4 (38.1)	15.5 (59.9)
Mean daily minimum °C (°F)	−2.1 (28.2)	0.7 (33.3)	5.5 (41.9)	11.1 (52.0)	16.5 (61.7)	21.4 (70.5)	24.1 (75.4)	23.2 (73.8)	18.2 (64.8)	12.3 (54.1)	5.6 (42.1)	−0.1 (31.8)	11.4 (52.5)
Record low °C (°F)	−15.5 (4.1)	−13.7 (7.3)	−7.5 (18.5)	−1.4 (29.5)	2.3 (36.1)	11.5 (52.7)	17.0 (62.6)	13.5 (56.3)	7.5 (45.5)	−1.3 (29.7)	−8.8 (16.2)	−15.8 (3.6)	−15.8 (3.6)
Average precipitation mm (inches)	15.7 (0.62)	18.6 (0.73)	30.8 (1.21)	41.9 (1.65)	70.2 (2.76)	88.4 (3.48)	184.2 (7.25)	127.9 (5.04)	79.9 (3.15)	46.6 (1.83)	36.4 (1.43)	15.6 (0.61)	756.2 (29.76)
Average precipitation days (≥ 0.1 mm)	4.8	5.3	6.3	6.3	8.2	7.8	11.5	10.3	8.6	6.4	6.4	4.7	86.6
Average snowy days	4.1	2.9	1.4	0	0	0	0	0	0	0	0.9	2.3	11.6
Average relative humidity (%)	67	65	64	67	68	67	79	82	77	70	70	67	70
Mean monthly sunshine hours	114.2	122.7	160.9	198.9	205.5	192.6	188.6	179.2	154.1	145.4	131.2	122.5	1,915.8
Percentage possible sunshine	36	39	43	51	48	45	43	44	42	42	42	40	43
Source: China Meteorological Administration

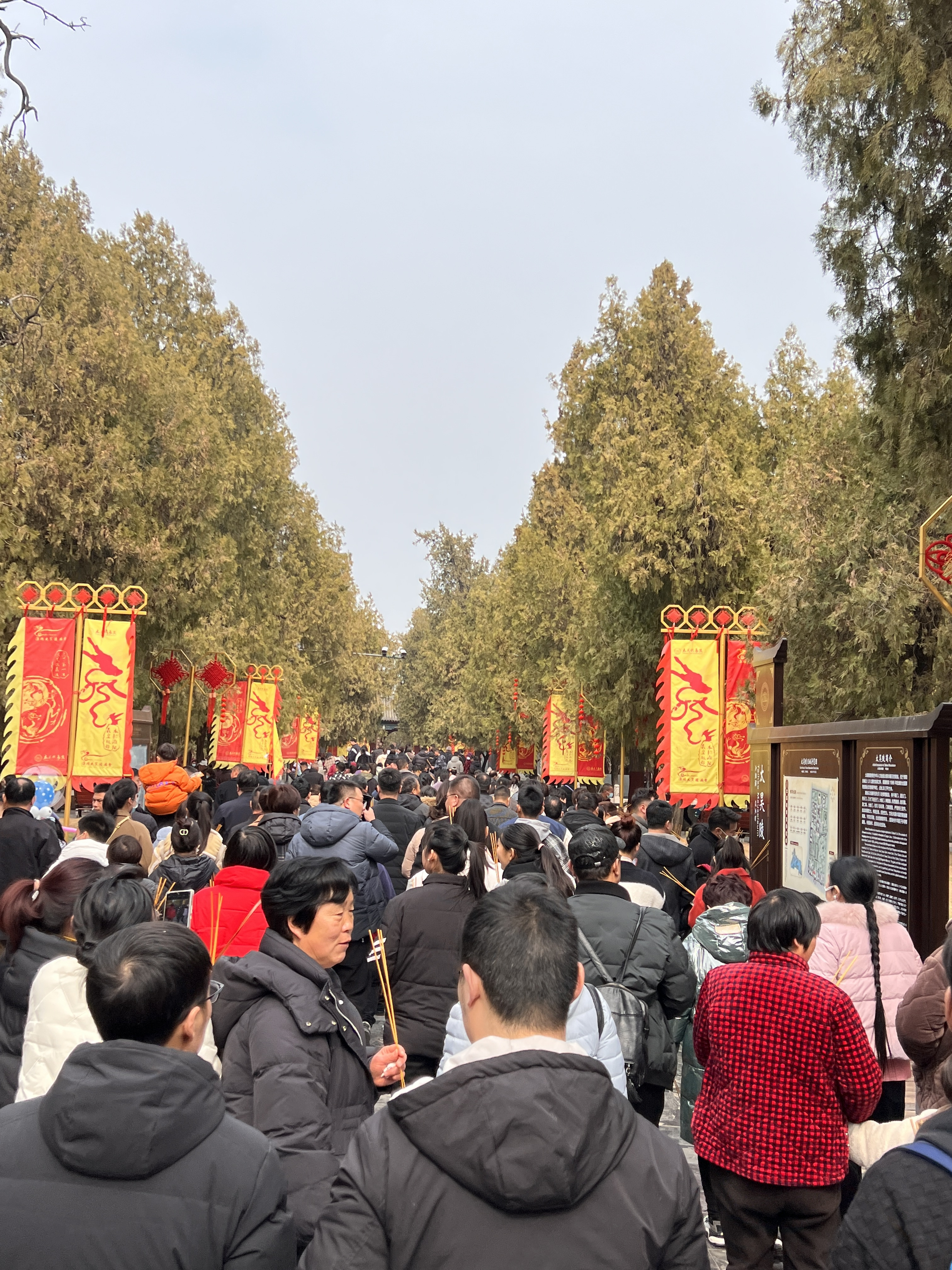
Everyone is waiting to enter the temple.
