= Ying River =

River in People's Republic of China

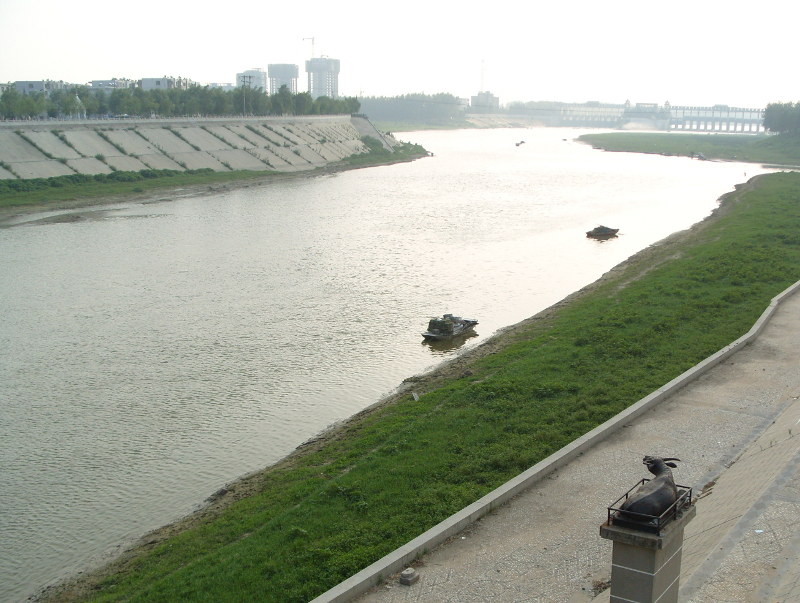
- The Shaying River at Zhoukou

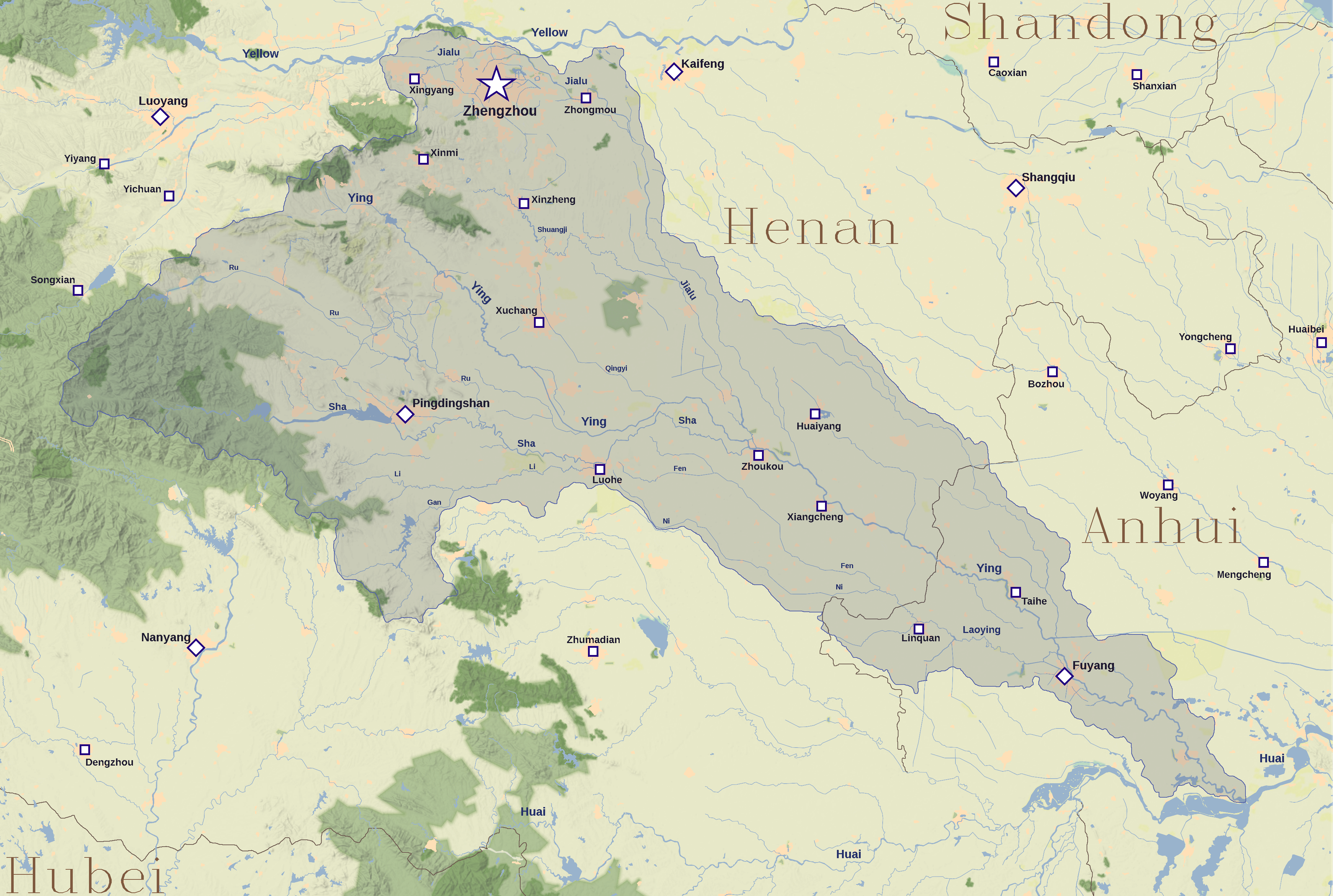
- Native name: 颍河 (Chinese)

Location
- Country: China

Physical characteristics
- Source: Henan
- Mouth: Huai River (淮河)
  - location: Zhengyang County, Henan, China
- Length: 557 km (346 mi)

The Ying River (simplified Chinese: 颍河; traditional Chinese: 潁河; pinyin: Yǐng Hé) is the largest tributary of the Huai River with its origin in Henan Province, People's Republic of China. From Zhoukou City in Henan, the river flows through Fuyang City in Anhui Province then empties into the Huai River at Shouxian.

Seriously polluted along its entire length, in 2007 the Ying River's water quality was rated as below Grade 5 by the Chinese Environmental Protection Agency.

== Tributaries ==
The Sha River (沙河) is the largest tributary and from the confluence onward, the Ying River is often referred to as the Shaying River (沙颍河).

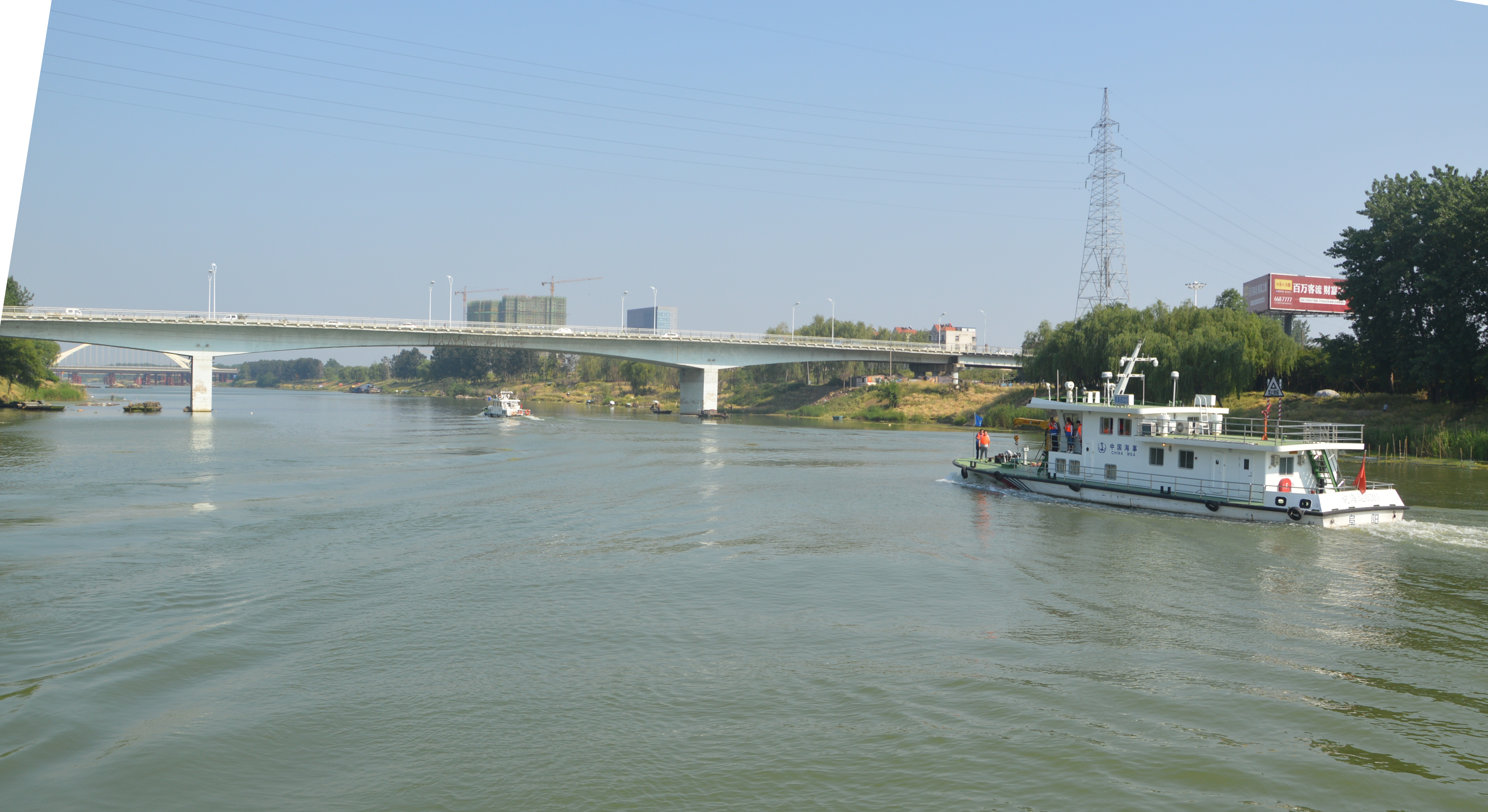
The Shaying river at Fuyang, Anhui province.

North bank	South bank
Jialu River (贾鲁河)	Sha River (沙河)
Xin Canal (新运河)	Quan River
Xin Cai River (新蔡河)	
Ci River (茨河)	

== See also ==
- List of rivers in China
- Zhoukou Port
