= Zhoukou =

Zhoukou 周口市 Chowkow
- Prefecture-level city
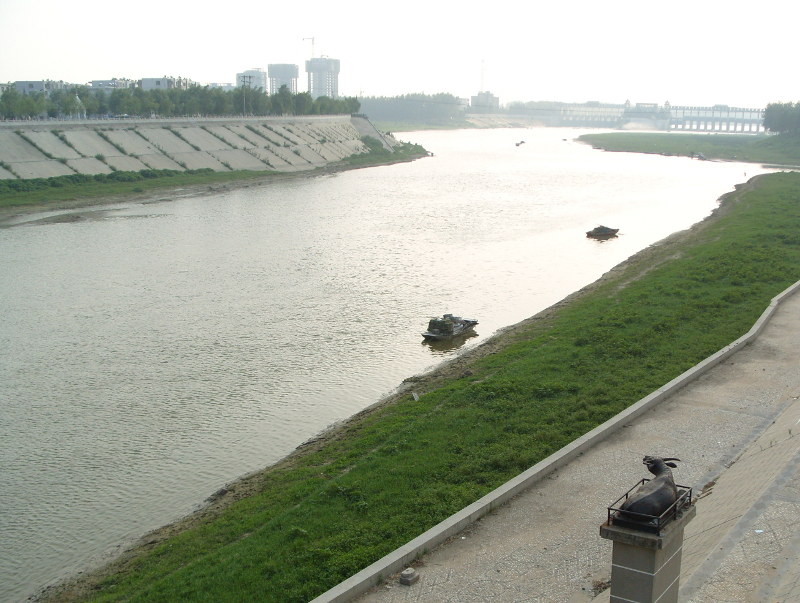
- Shaying River near downtown of Zhoukou City

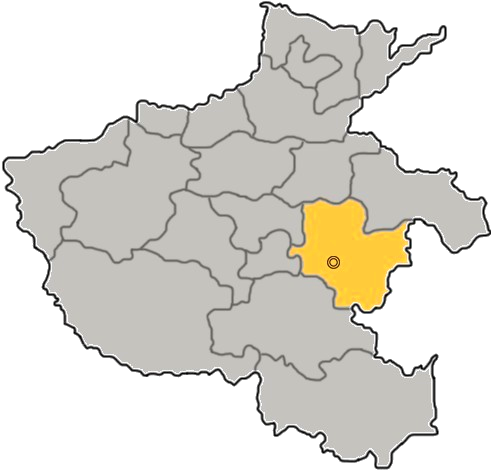
- Zhoukou in Henan

- Location in China
- Coordinates (Zhoukou municipal government): 33°38′12″N 114°42′05″E
- Country: People's Republic of China
- Province: Henan
- Municipal seat: Chuanhui District

Area
  - Prefecture-level city: 11,959 km^{2} (4,617 sq mi)
  - Urban: 141 km^{2} (54 sq mi)
  - Metro: 1,454 km^{2} (561 sq mi)

Population (2020 census for total, 2018 otherwise)
  - Prefecture-level city: 9,026,015
  - Density: 754.75/km^{2} (1,954.8/sq mi)
  - Urban: 721,300
  - Urban density: 5,120/km^{2} (13,200/sq mi)
  - Metro: 1,601,300
  - Metro density: 1,101/km^{2} (2,852/sq mi)

GDP
  - Prefecture-level city: CN¥ 226.4 billion US$ 34.1 billion
  - Per capita: CN¥ 25,682; US$ 3,866
- Time zone: UTC+8 (China Standard)
- Postal code: 466000
- Area code: 0394
- ISO 3166 code: CN-HA-16
- Vehicle registration: 豫P
- Major Nationalities: Han
- County-level divisions: 9
- Township-level divisions: 1
- Website: www.zhoukou.gov.cn

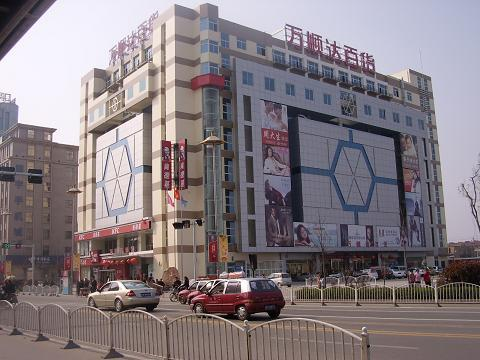
Chuanhui District, Zhoukou

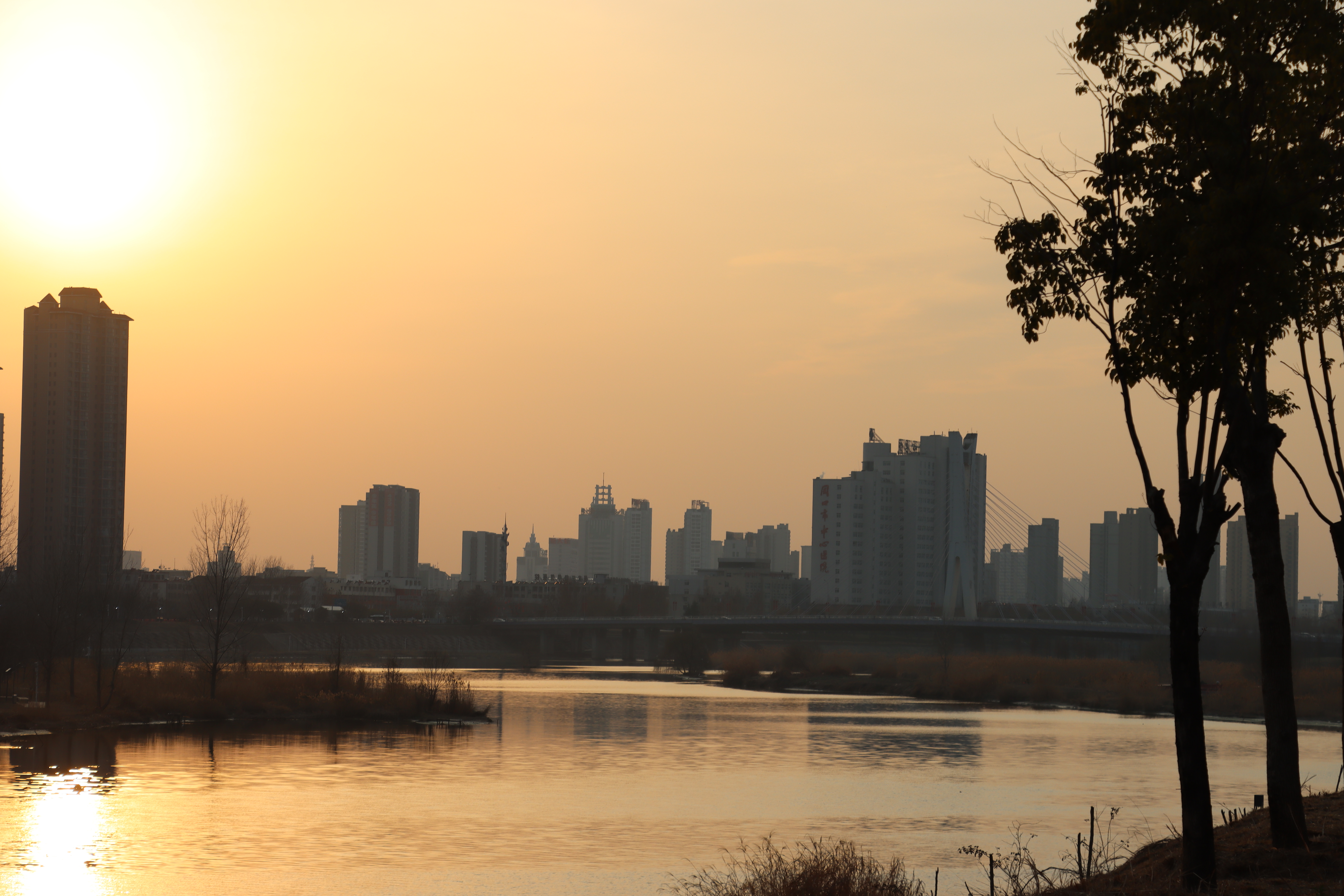
Daqing Road Bridge in Chuanhui District under the sunset

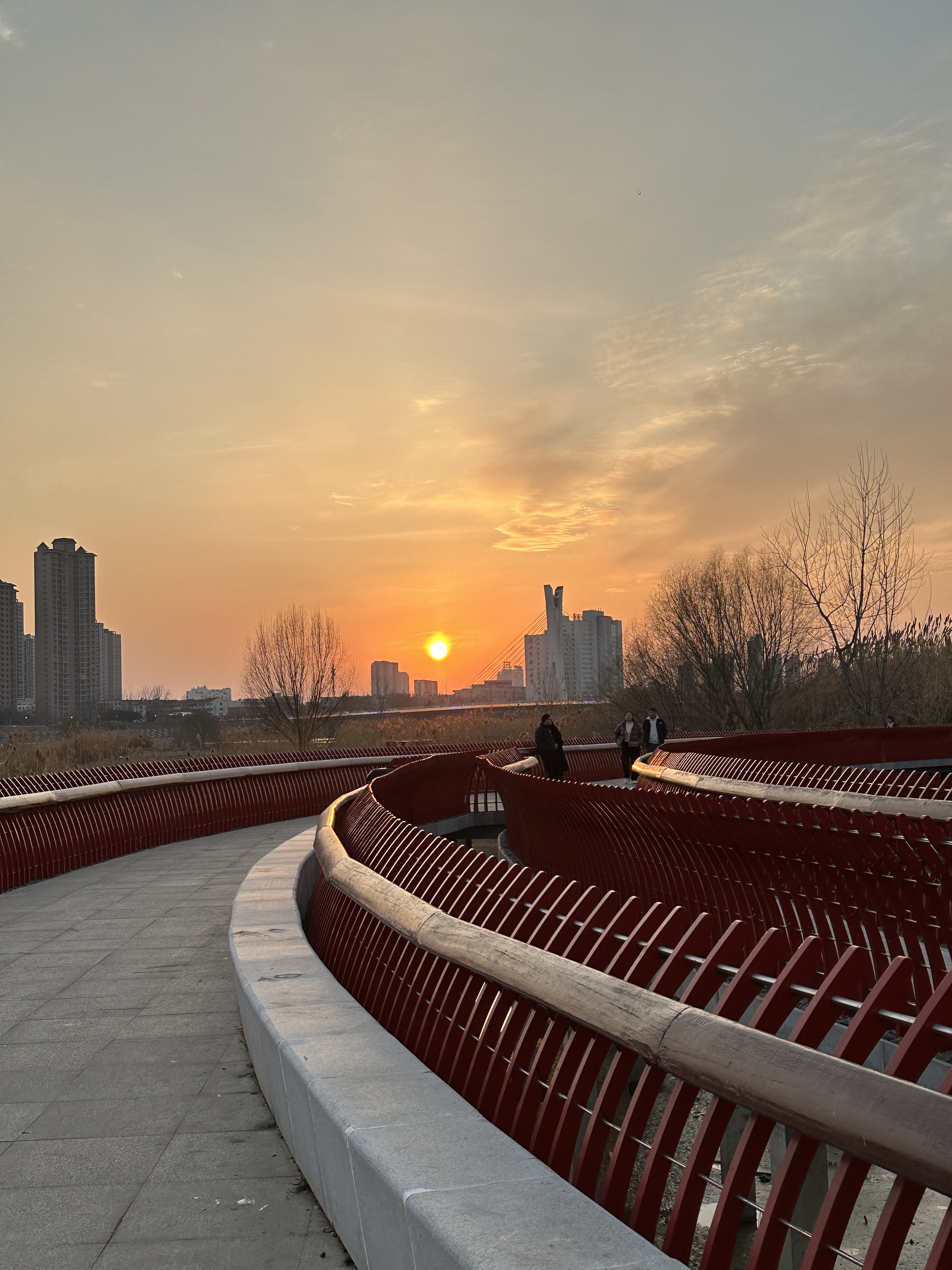
The plank road under the Daqing Road Bridge

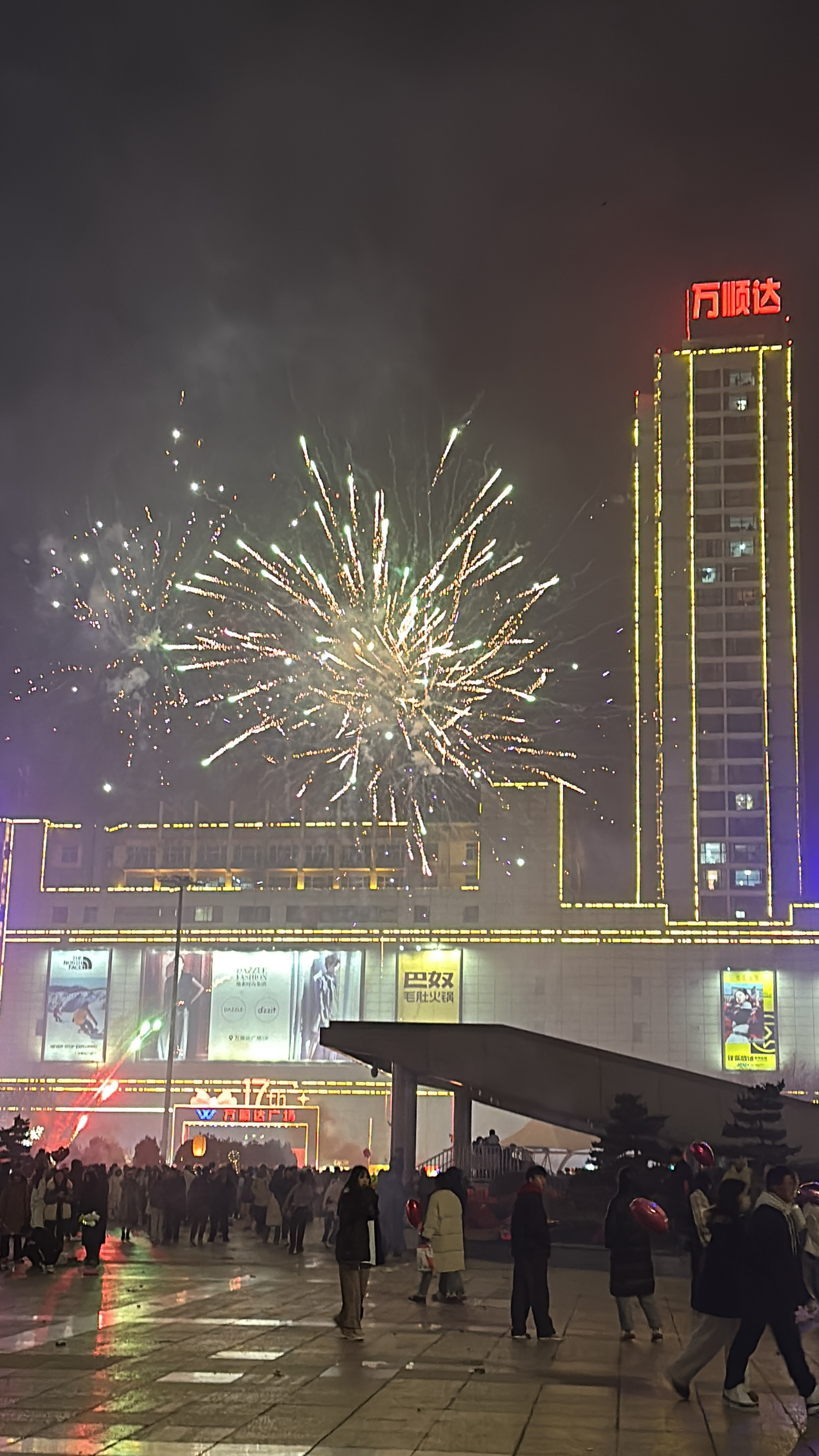
Zhoukou on New Year's Eve

Zhoukou (Chinese: 周口; pinyin: Zhōukǒu; Wade–Giles: Chou-k’ou; postal: Chowkow) is a prefecture-level city in eastern Henan province, China. It borders Zhumadian to the southwest, Xuchang and Luohe to the west, Kaifeng to the northwest, Shangqiu to the northeast, and the province of Anhui on all other sides. As of the 2020 census, its population was 9,026,015 inhabitants. However, as of the 2018 estimation, 1,601,300 lived in the built-up (or metro) made up of Chuanhui district and the northern part of Shangshui county.

The history and geography of Zhoukou have made it a city. As the ancient capitals of Emperor Yao and the birthplace of Laozi, it carries a cultural heritage of China. At the same time, the remnants of the Chen and Chu cultures endow Zhoukou with historical significance. The development of the Lin'gang New City reflects the city's modernization process and economic development.

The convergence of the Sha Ying rivers has endowed Zhoukou with unparalleled geographical advantages, making it a hub known as the Central Plains Port City. This bestowed upon Zhoukou significant importance in ancient times, and today, with further improvements in transportation infrastructure, its advantages are even more pronounced.

The integrated transportation network comprising highways, railways, and waterways has provided robust support for the city's development, facilitating economic growth and connections with the outside world. This transportation advantage has not only driven the local economy of Zhoukou but has also positioned it as a vital nexus linking the Central Plains with other regions.

== Administration ==
The prefecture-level city of Zhoukou administers 2 districts, 1 county-level city and 7 counties.

- Chuanhui District (川汇区)
- Huaiyang District (淮阳区)
- Xiangcheng City (项城市)
- Shenqiu County (沈丘县)
- Dancheng County (郸城县)
- Luyi County (鹿邑县)
- Taikang County (太康县)
- Fugou County (扶沟县)
- Xihua County (西华县)
- Shangshui County (商水县)

Map
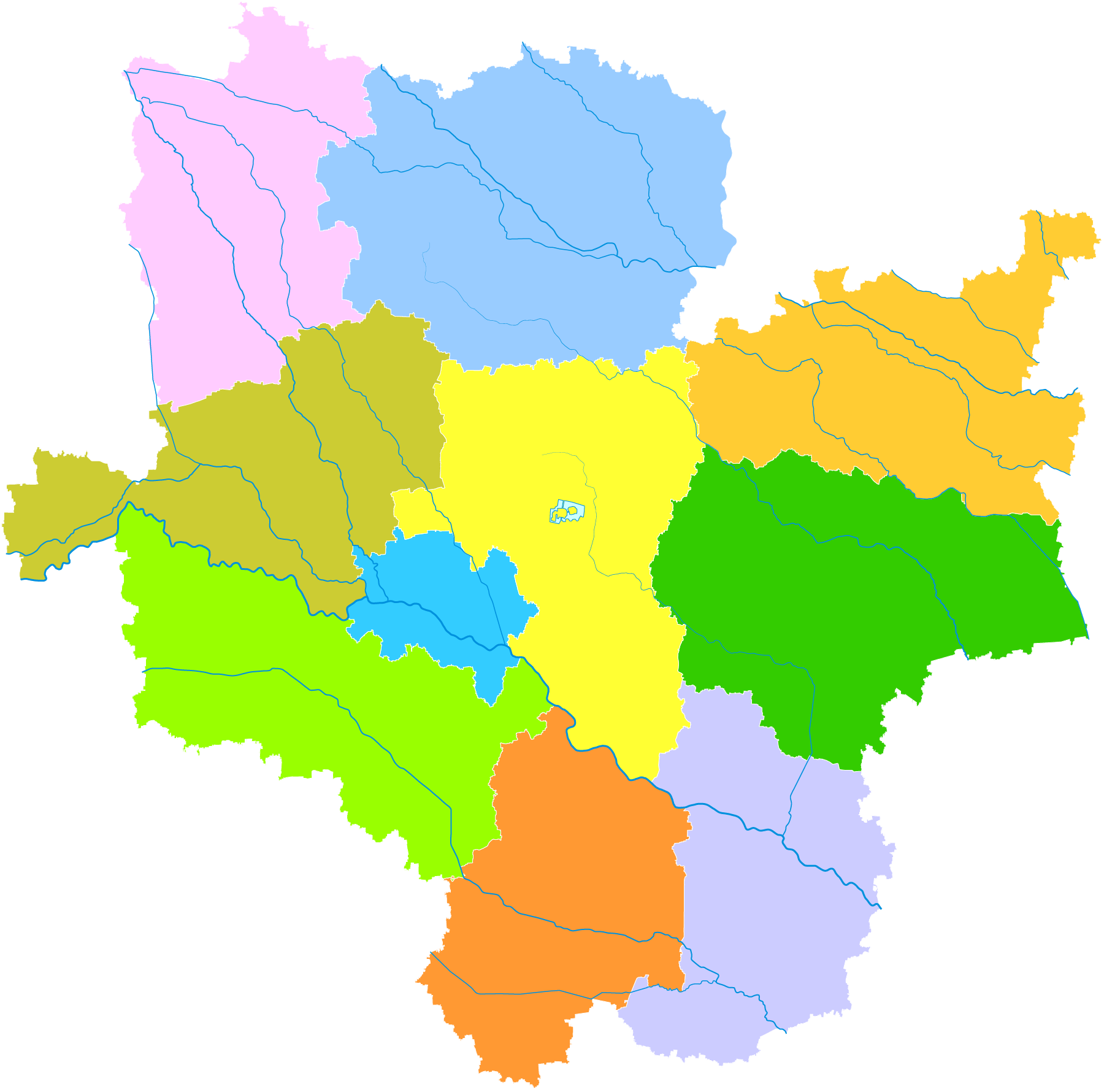

== Climate ==
Climate data for Zhoukou (Chuanhui District), elevation 47 m (154 ft), (1991–2020 normals, extremes 1981–present)
Month	Jan	Feb	Mar	Apr	May	Jun	Jul	Aug	Sep	Oct	Nov	Dec	Year
Record high °C (°F)	21.3 (70.3)	25.7 (78.3)	33.5 (92.3)	33.9 (93.0)	38.5 (101.3)	40.5 (104.9)	40.5 (104.9)	39.8 (103.6)	37.8 (100.0)	35.2 (95.4)	28.0 (82.4)	21.3 (70.3)	40.5 (104.9)
Mean daily maximum °C (°F)	6.5 (43.7)	10.3 (50.5)	15.8 (60.4)	22.3 (72.1)	27.7 (81.9)	32.2 (90.0)	32.8 (91.0)	31.4 (88.5)	27.8 (82.0)	22.7 (72.9)	15.1 (59.2)	8.6 (47.5)	21.1 (70.0)
Daily mean °C (°F)	1.8 (35.2)	5.1 (41.2)	10.3 (50.5)	16.5 (61.7)	22.0 (71.6)	26.5 (79.7)	28.1 (82.6)	26.9 (80.4)	22.6 (72.7)	16.9 (62.4)	9.8 (49.6)	3.8 (38.8)	15.9 (60.5)
Mean daily minimum °C (°F)	−1.6 (29.1)	1.2 (34.2)	5.9 (42.6)	11.6 (52.9)	17.0 (62.6)	20.3 (68.5)	24.4 (75.9)	23.5 (74.3)	18.7 (65.7)	12.7 (54.9)	6.0 (42.8)	0.3 (32.5)	11.7 (53.0)
Record low °C (°F)	−14.4 (6.1)	−13.9 (7.0)	−6.6 (20.1)	−0.4 (31.3)	5.3 (41.5)	11.5 (52.7)	17.4 (63.3)	13.4 (56.1)	8.0 (46.4)	−1.3 (29.7)	−6.9 (19.6)	−14.3 (6.3)	−14.4 (6.1)
Average precipitation mm (inches)	17.0 (0.67)	20.1 (0.79)	34.5 (1.36)	38.9 (1.53)	72.8 (2.87)	104.1 (4.10)	175.7 (6.92)	137.4 (5.41)	75.5 (2.97)	48.4 (1.91)	37.9 (1.49)	16.7 (0.66)	779 (30.68)
Average precipitation days (≥ 0.1 mm)	5.0	5.3	6.2	6.4	8.2	8.4	11.2	10.9	8.2	6.6	6.3	4.7	87.4
Average snowy days	4.0	2.9	1.2	0	0	0	0	0	0	0	0.9	2.1	11.1
Average relative humidity (%)	65	64	63	65	66	66	77	79	74	68	69	65	68
Mean monthly sunshine hours	111.7	123.8	160.9	189.5	198.5	181.8	179.3	166.5	149.4	145.2	129.3	115.7	1,851.6
Percentage possible sunshine	35	40	43	48	46	42	41	41	41	42	42	38	42
Source: China Meteorological Administration all-time January high

== History ==
For thousands of years, Chen (now at Huaiyang) had been the center of this area and a nationally well-known city. The ancient city site founded at Pingliangtai (near Huaiyang) is over 4600 years old, which is one of the oldest cities in China. According to the legend, Fu Xi, the first of the Three Sovereigns of ancient China, died in the city. During the Spring and Autumn period, Chen was the capital of Chen State and then annexed by Chu. Therefore, the area was usually referred to as "Chen Chu" in ancient times. The leaders of the first Chinese peasant uprising (the Dazexiang uprising) established the government at Chen.

The city's name "Zhoukou" is short for "Zhoujiakou", which literally means "Zhou's ferry". Located at the intersection of Jialu River and Shaying River, it started to develop as a river harbor of China's Inland Water Transport System in the early Ming dynasty. By the end of the 18th century, two towns along the rivers merged into one big town with several tens of thousand permanent residents. From the port, cargo could either be shipped south to the Yangtze River or north to the Yellow River. However, after the "sea ban" was canceled, sea transport began to play a major role on the trade between Jiangnan and North China, which diminished the utility of inland waterways. The cost of maintaining the river channels kept increasing because of the ever-rising river bed. The appearance of railways and modern roads in the early 20th century lead to a recession in the water transport business nearby. Finally, in the 1970s, a dam was built on the Shaying River, which cut the city's last waterway.

In 2000, the government of the Zhoukou prefecture-level city was founded. The old county-level city and its suburban area became Chuanhui District.

In 2004, Zhoukou City was recognized as the only prefecture-level "Hometown of Chinese Acrobatics" in the country. On January 22, 2020, the Ministry of Housing and Urban-Rural Development named Zhoukou City a National Garden City. On May 18, 2020, Zhoukou City was awarded the title of "Civilized City of Henan Province". On October 20 of the same year, it was selected as a "National Model City for Supporting Military Service". In 2021, Zhoukou Port was listed as one of the 36 national-level major inland ports. In June 2023, Zhoukou City was granted the title of "Hometown of Chinese Literature" in China.

== Economy ==
Zhoukou is a major agricultural producer in the province of Henan. Its economy is mainly based on the trade of agricultural products, such as grain, cotton, oil, meat and tobacco. In particular, Zhoukou is famous for the skin of the Huai Goat, a local breed of goat.

== Transportation ==
Railways

- Luofu Railway (Luohe-Fuyang)

Expressways

- Nanluo Expressway (Nanjing-Luoyang)
- Shangzhou Expressway (Shangqiu-Zhoukou)
- Daguang Expressway (Daqing-Guangzhou)
- Yongdeng Expressway (Yongcheng-Dengfeng)

Highways

- China National Highway 311 (G311)
- China National Highway 106 (G106)

Waterways

- Zhoukou Port

== Education ==
Universities and Colleges

- Zhoukou Normal University (周口师范学院)
- Zhoukou Vocational College of Science and Technology (周口科技职业学院)
- Zhoukou Institute of Education (周口教育学院)
- Zhoukou Polytechnic (周口职业技术学院)

Schools

- Zhoukou No.7 Middle School (周口七中)
- Huaiyang High School (淮阳中学)
- Zhoukou First High School (周口一高)
- High School of Fugou County (扶沟县高级中学)
- Xiangcheng First High School (项城一高)
- Shangshui First High School (商水一高)

== Notable people ==
- Laozi (philosopher and central figure in Taoism)
- Wu Guang (leader of the Dazexiang uprising)
- Yuan Shikai (politician)
- Ji Hongchang (general)
- Yue Wenhai (governor)
- Shuping Wang (HIV researcher)
- Wei Rui (sanshou fighter and professional kickboxer)
- Zhang Zhilei (professional heavyweight boxer)
- Jia Aoqi (sanshou fighter and professional kickboxer)
- Xu Jiayin (Chinese businessman and founder of Evergrande Group)

== Sister cities ==
- Petropavl (Petropavlovsk), Kazakhstan
- Taió, Santa Catarina, Brazil
- Uberlândia, Minas Gerais, Brazil
