= Stupa =

Domed structure containing Buddhist relics

Translations of Stupa
- English: Stupa
- Sanskrit: स्तूप
- Pali: 𑀣𑀼𑀩𑁂 ("thube"), thūpa
- Bengali: স্তূপ (stup)
- Burmese: စေတီ (MLCTS: zèdì)
- Chinese: 窣堵坡 (Pinyin: sūdǔpō)
- Japanese: 卒塔婆 (Rōmaji: sotoba)
- Khmer: ចេតិយ, ស្តូប (UNGEGN: chétĕy, stob)
- Korean: 솔도파 (RR: soldopha)
- Mon: စေတဳ ([ce.tɔe])
- Mongolian: суварга (suvarga)
- Shan: ၵွင်းမူး ([kɔŋ˥.muː˥])
- Sinhala: දාගැබ් (dagab)
- Tamil: தாது கோபுரம்
- Tibetan: མཆོད་རྟེན་ (mchod rten (chorten))
- Thai: สถูป, เจดีย์ (RTGS: sa thup, chedi)
- Vietnamese: Phù đồ, bảo tháp

Stupa

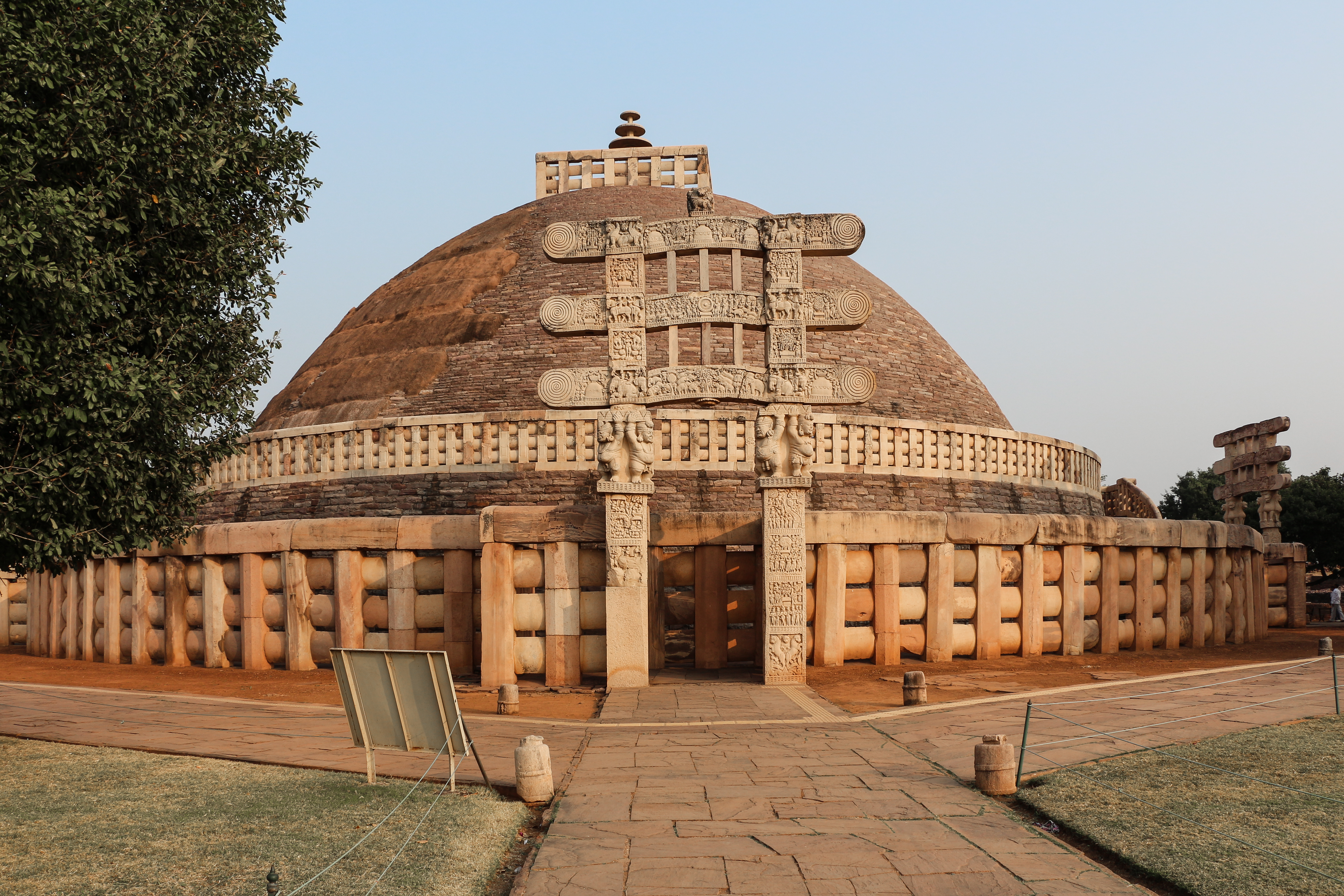
The Great Stupa of Sanchi, Madhya Pradesh, India

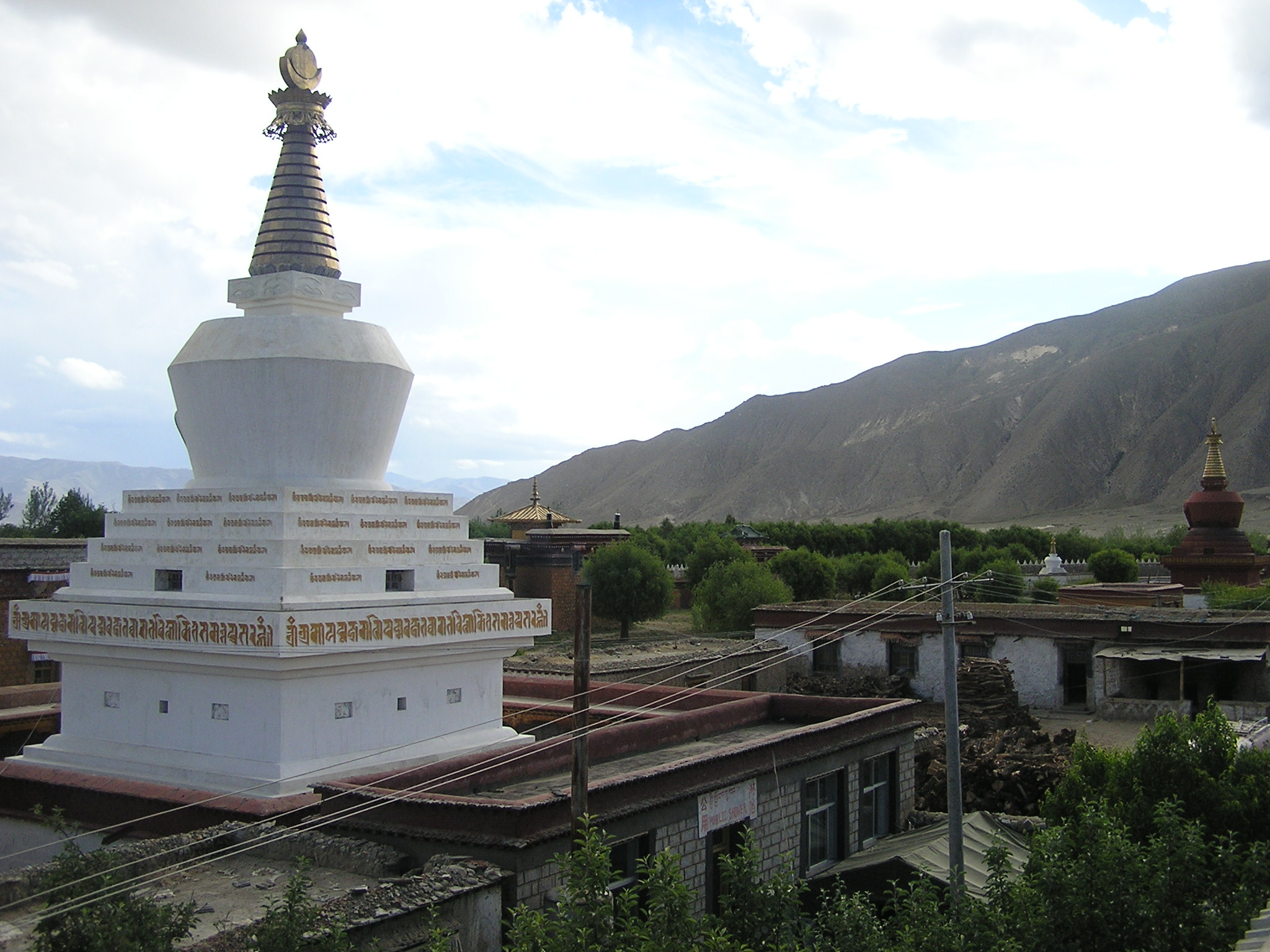
The White Stupa of Samye Monastery, Lhoka, Tibet

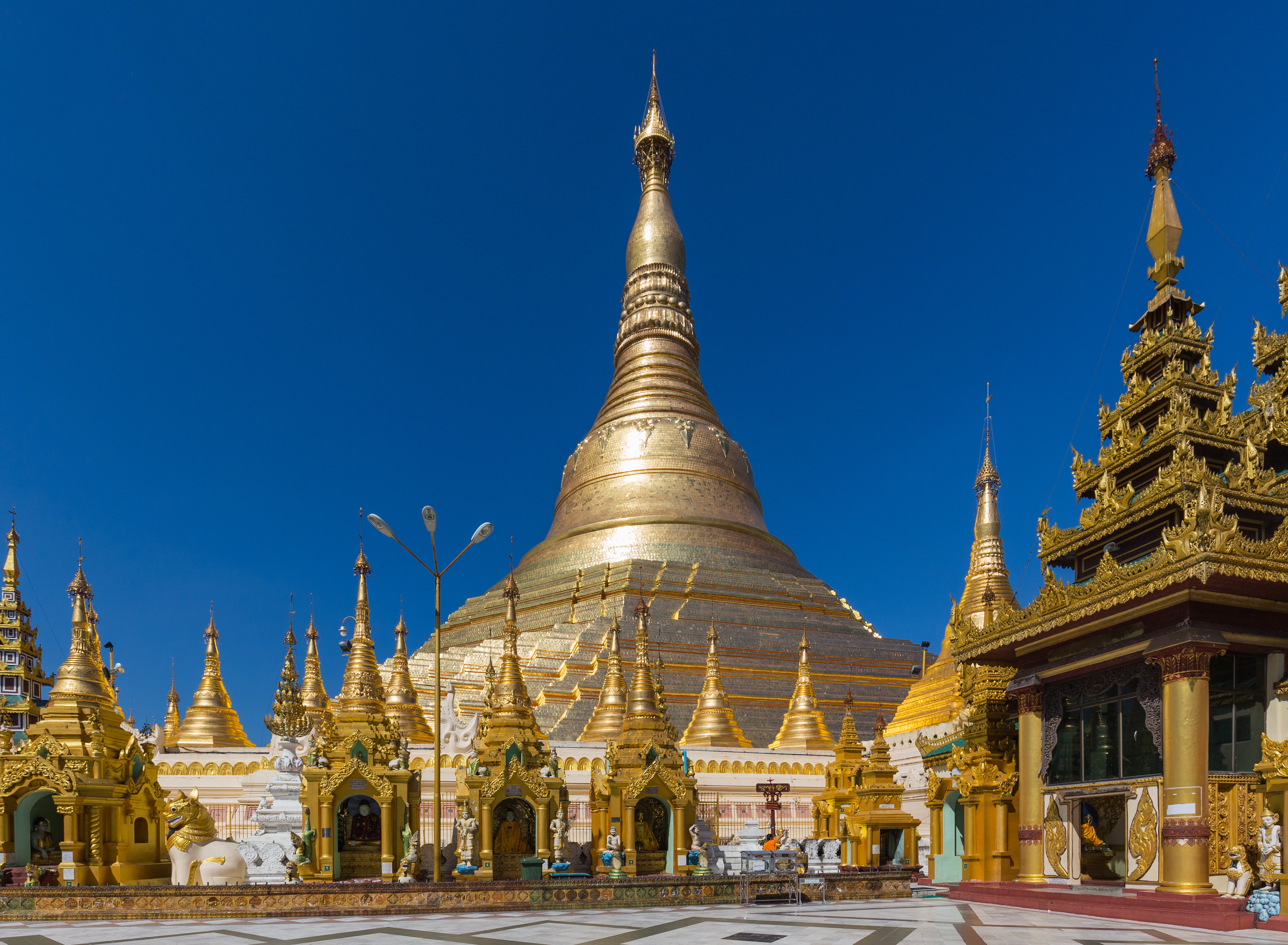
Shwedagon Pagoda, Yangon, Myanmar

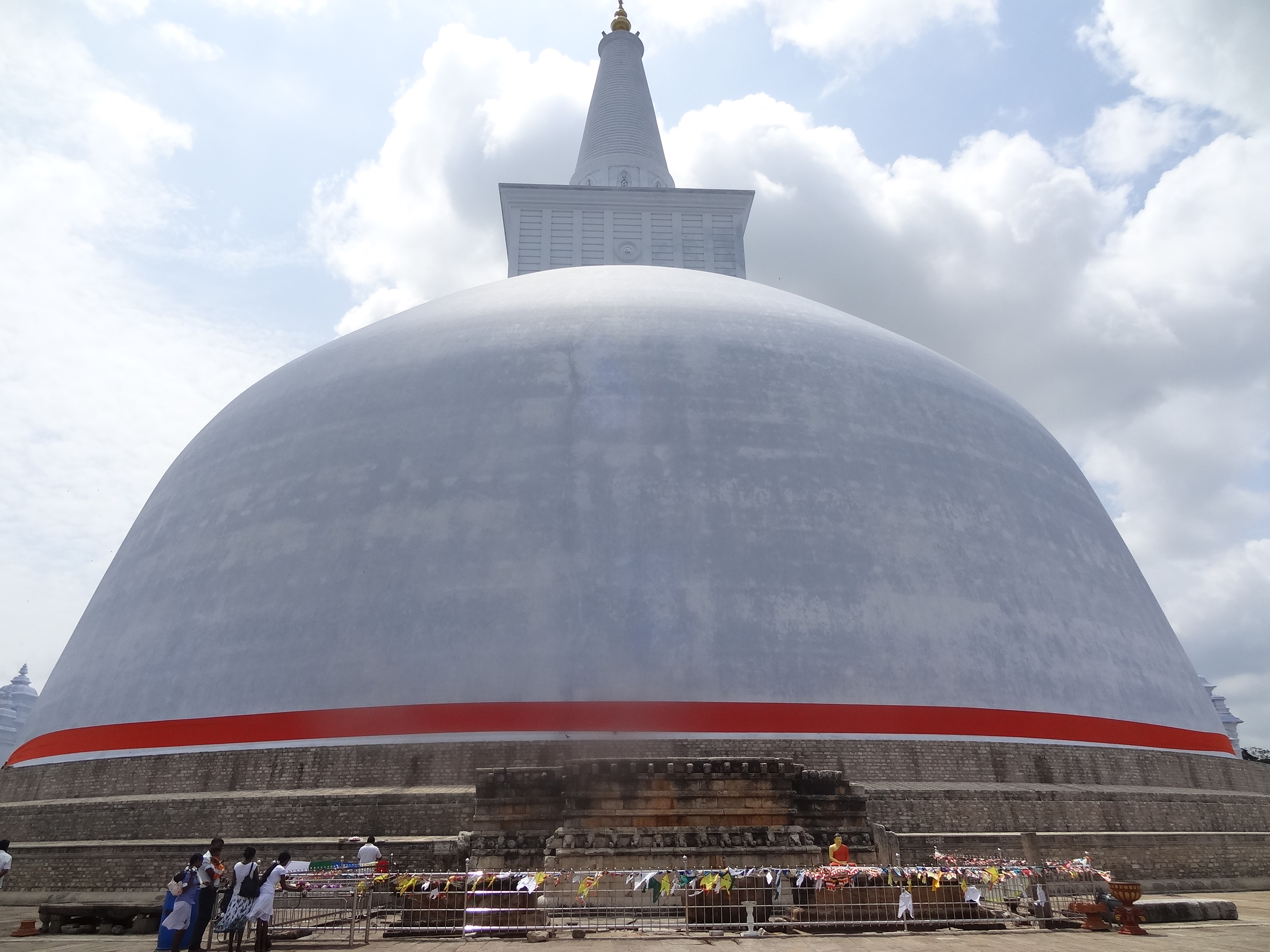
Ruwanweliseya, Anuradhapura, Sri Lanka

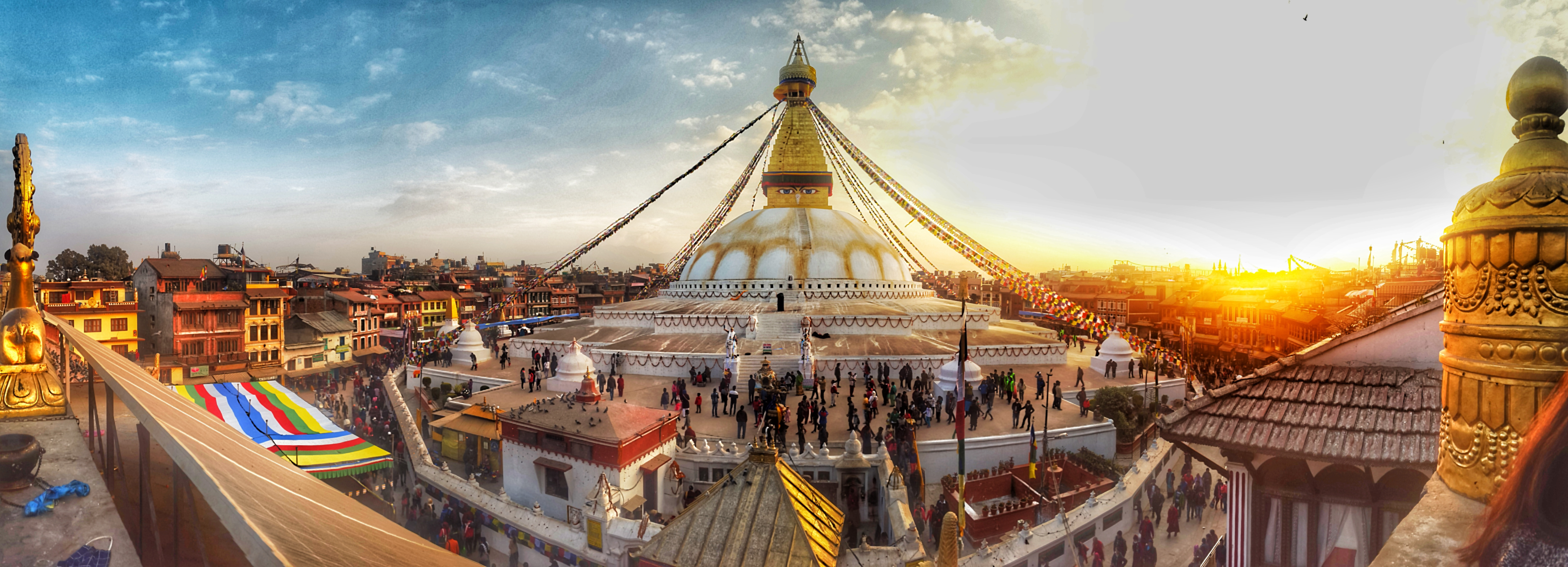
Boudha Stupa, Kathmandu, Nepal

Various architectural styles of stupa: Indian at Sanchi, Tibetan at Samye, Burmese at Yangon, Sri Lankan at Anuradhapura and Nepalese at Kathmandu

In Buddhism, a stupa (Sanskrit: स्तूप, lit. 'heap', IAST: stūpa; Pali: thūpa) is a domed hemispherical structure containing several types of sacred relics, including images, statues, metals, and śarīra—the remains of Buddhist monks or nuns. It is used as a place of pilgrimage and meditation.

Walking around a stupa in a clockwise direction, known as pradakhshina, has been an important ritual and devotional practice in Buddhism since the earliest times, and stupas always have a pradakhshina path around them. The original South Asian form is a large solid dome above a tholobate, or drum, with vertical sides, which usually sits on a square base. There is no access to the inside of the structure. In large stupas, there may be walkways for circumambulation on top of the base as well as on the ground below it. Large stupas have, or had, vedikā railings outside the path around the base, often highly decorated with sculpture, especially at the torana gateways, of which there are usually four. At the top of the dome is a thin, vertical element, with one or more horizontal discs spreading from it. These were chatras, symbolic umbrellas, and have not survived, if not restored. The Great Stupa at Sanchi in Madhya Pradesh, is the most famous and best-preserved early stupa in India.

Apart from very large stupas, there are many smaller stupas in a range of sizes, which typically have much taller drums, relative to the height of the dome. Small votive stupas built by or paid for by pilgrims might be less than a metre high, and laid out in rows by the hundred, as at Ratnagiri, Odisha, India.

The principal design of the stupa may have been influenced by the shikharas seen on Hindu temples. As Buddhism spread across Asia via the Silk Road, stupas were stylistically altered into other cultural and structural forms used for the same purposes, like the pagodas of East Asian Buddhism or the chortens of Tibetan Buddhism. In Southeast Asia, various different elongated shapes of domes evolved, leading to high, thin spires. A related architectural term is a chaitya, which is a prayer hall or temple containing a stupa.

== Description and history ==
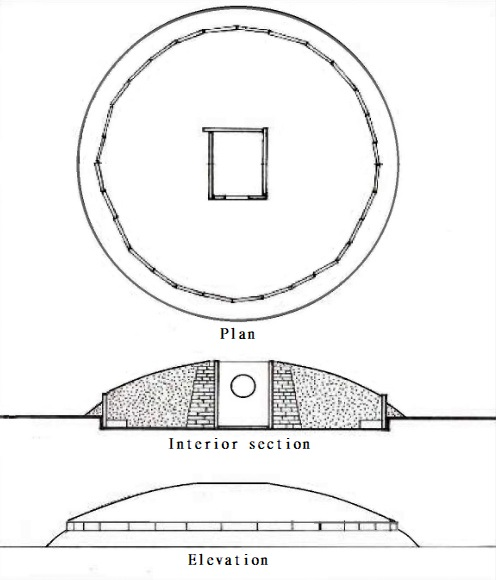
Megalithic burial mound (tumulus) with chamber, India

Stupas may have originated as pre-Buddhist tumuli in which śramaṇas were buried in a seated position, called caitya.

In early Buddhist inscriptions in India, stupa and caitya appear to be almost interchangeable, though caitya has a broader meaning, and unlike stupa does not define an architectural form. In pre-Buddhist India, caitya was a term for a shrine, sanctuary, or holy place in the landscape, generally outdoors, inhabited by, or sacred to, a particular deity. In the Mahāyāna Mahāparinirvāṇa Sūtra, near the end of his life, the Buddha remarks to Ananda how beautiful are the various caitya around Vaishali. In later times and in other countries, cetiya/caitya implies the presence of important relics. Both words have forms prefixed by maha for "great", "large", or "important", but scholars find the difference between a mahastupa and a stupa, or mahacetiya and cetiya, hard to pin down.

Some authors have suggested that stupas were derived from a wider cultural tradition from the Mediterranean to the Ganges Valley and can be related to the conical mounds on circular bases from the 8th century BCE that are found in Phrygia (tomb of Midas, 8th c. BCE), Lydia (tomb of Alyattes, 6th c. BCE), or in Phoenicia (tombs of Amrit, 5th c. BCE). Some authors suggest stupas emerged from megalithic mound burials with chambers, which likely represent proto-stupas.

Archaeologists in India have observed that a number of early Buddhist stupas or burials are found in the vicinity of much older, pre-historic burials, including megalithic burial sites. This includes sites associated with the Indus Valley Civilization, where broken Indus-era pottery was incorporated into later Buddhist burials. Scholars have noted structural and functional features of the stupa (including its general mound shape and the practice of surrounding stupas with a stone, relic chamber, or wooden railing) with both pre-Mauryan-era cairn and pre-historic megalithic "round mound" burials with chambers found in India, which likely represent a "proto-stupa".

In Dholavira, an archeological site associated with the Indus Valley Civilization, there are several large and high "hemispherical monuments" of tumulus with brick-masonry found with burial chambers inside. Among them, Tumulus-1 and Tumulus-2 mounds have been excavated. They consist of a deep and wide rock-cut chamber, surrounded on the ground by a massive circular mud-brick structure made in two tiers, and filled in and topped with earth to form a domed shape. There is also evidence of plastering on the exterior of Tumulus-1, bearing a 10-mm-thick plaster of pinkish-white clay over brick masonry. These forms of hemispherical monuments or tumulus of brick masonry with similar layouts may have been inspirations for later stupas. Some stupas not believed to have been looted have been found empty when excavated, as have some prehistoric cairn sites, and animal bones are suspected to have occasionally been deposited at both types of sites.

=== Mounds for the relics of the Buddha (5th century BCE) ===
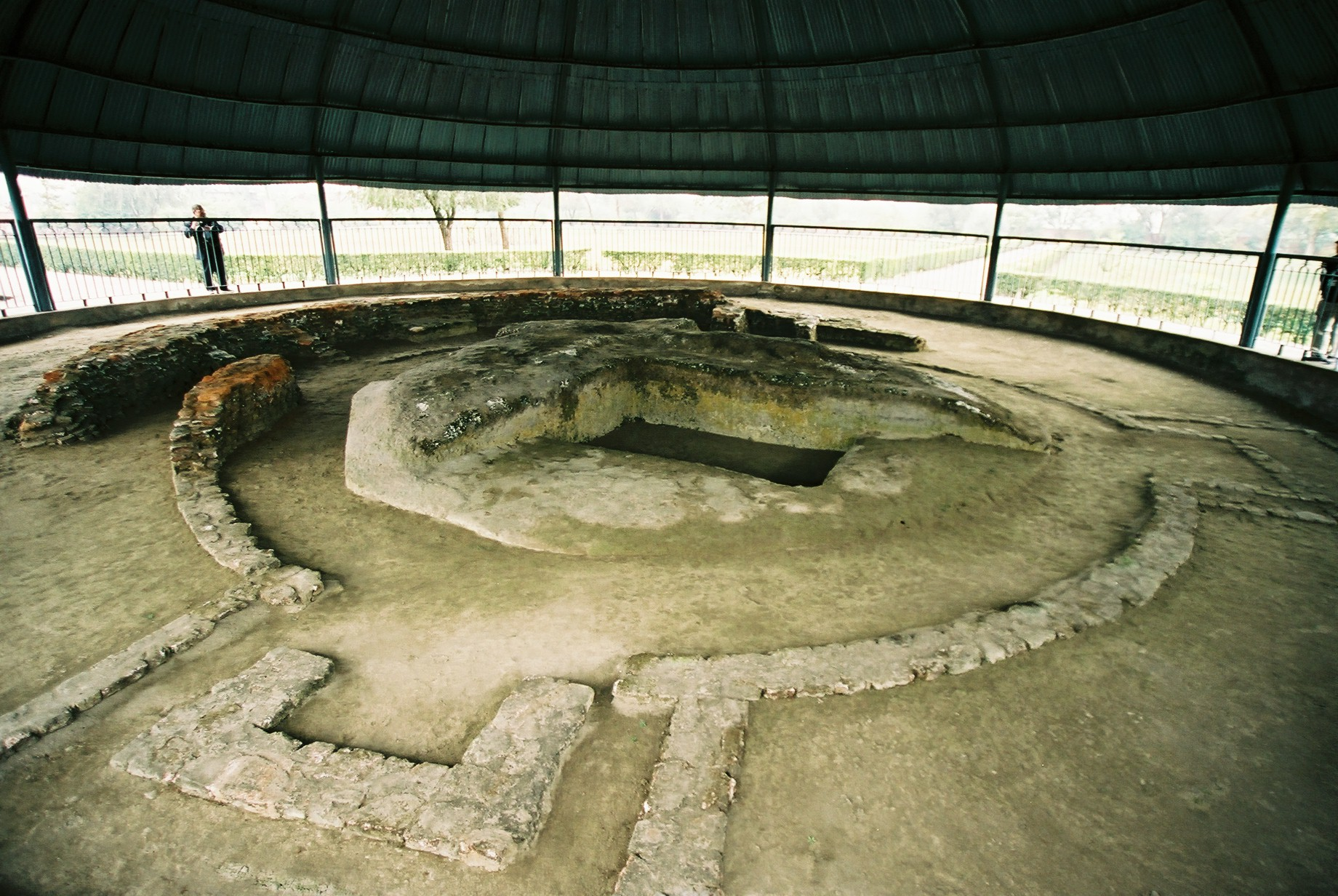
Relic Stupa of Vaishali, built by the Licchavis, and possibly the earliest archaeologically known stupa, dating to the 5th century BCE

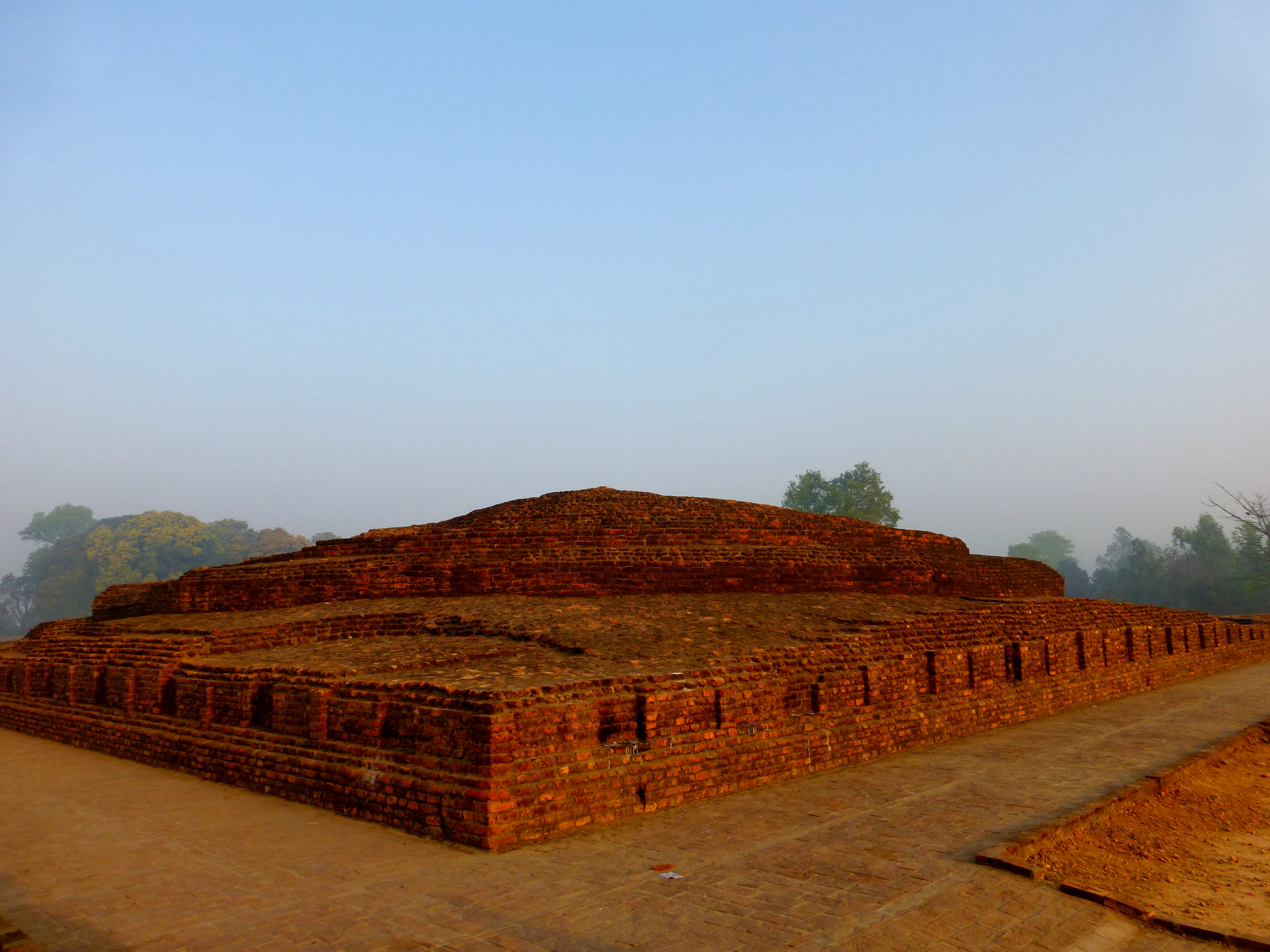
The Piprahwa stupa is one of the earliest surviving stupas.

Religious buildings in the form of the Buddhist stupa, a dome-shaped structure, started to be used in India as commemorative monuments associated with storing sacred relics of the Buddha. After his parinirvana, Buddha's remains were cremated and the ashes divided and buried under eight mounds, with two further mounds encasing the urn and the embers.

According to some early Buddhist sources, the Buddha himself had suggested this treatment, and when asked what a stupa was, had demonstrated the basic design: he folded his robe on the ground, placed his begging bowl upside down on it, with his staff above that.

The relics of the Buddha were spread between eight stupas, in Rajagriha, Vaishali, Kapilavastu, Allakappa, Ramagrama, Pava, Kushinagar, and Vethapida. Lars Fogelin has stated that the Relic Stupa of Vaishali is likely the earliest archaeologically known stupa.

Guard rails—consisting of posts, crossbars, and a coping—became a feature of safety surrounding a stupa. The Buddha had left instructions about how to pay homage to the stupas: "And whoever lays wreaths or puts sweet perfumes and colours there with a devout heart, will reap benefits for a long time". This practice would lead to the decoration of the stupas with stone sculptures of flower garlands in the Classical period.

=== Expansion under Ashoka (250 BCE) ===
According to Buddhist tradition, Emperor Ashoka (rule: 273–232 BCE) recovered the relics of the Buddha from the earlier stupas (except from the Ramagrama stupa), and erected 84,000 stupas to distribute the relics across India. In effect, many stupas are thought to date originally from the time of Ashoka, such as Sanchi or Kesariya, where he also erected pillars with his inscriptions, and possibly Bharhut, Amaravati, or Dharmarajika. Ashoka also established the Pillars of Ashoka throughout his realm, generally next to Buddhist stupas.

The first known appearance of the word "stupa" is from an inscribed dedication by Ashoka on the Nigali Sagar pillar (spelled in Pali in the Brahmi script as 𑀣𑀼𑀩𑁂 thube ).

=== Decorated stupas (from 125 BCE) ===
Stupas were soon to be richly decorated with sculptural reliefs, following the first attempts at Sanchi Stupa No.2 (125 BCE). Full-fledged sculptural decorations and scenes of the life of the Buddha would soon follow at Bharhut (115 BCE), Bodh Gaya (60 BCE), Mathura (125–60 BCE), again at Sanchi for the elevation of the toranas (1st century BCE/CE), and then Amaravati (1st–2nd century CE). The decorative embellishment of stupas also underwent considerable development in the northwest, in the area of Gandhara, with instances such as the Butkara Stupa ("monumentalized" with Hellenistic decorative elements from the 2nd century BCE) or the Loriyan Tangai stupas (2nd century CE).

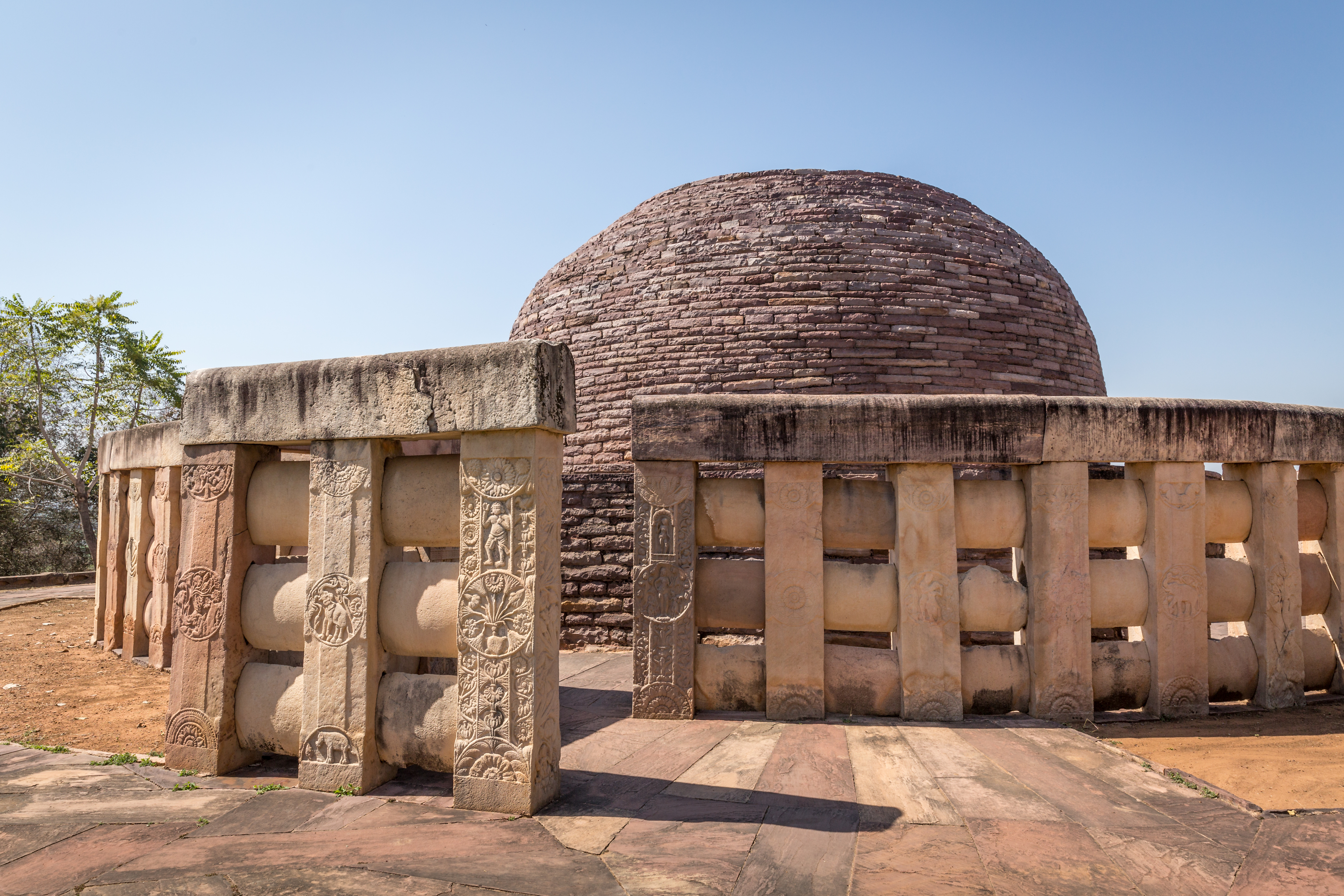
Sanchi Stupa No.2, the earliest known stupa with important displays of decorative reliefs, c. 125 BCE

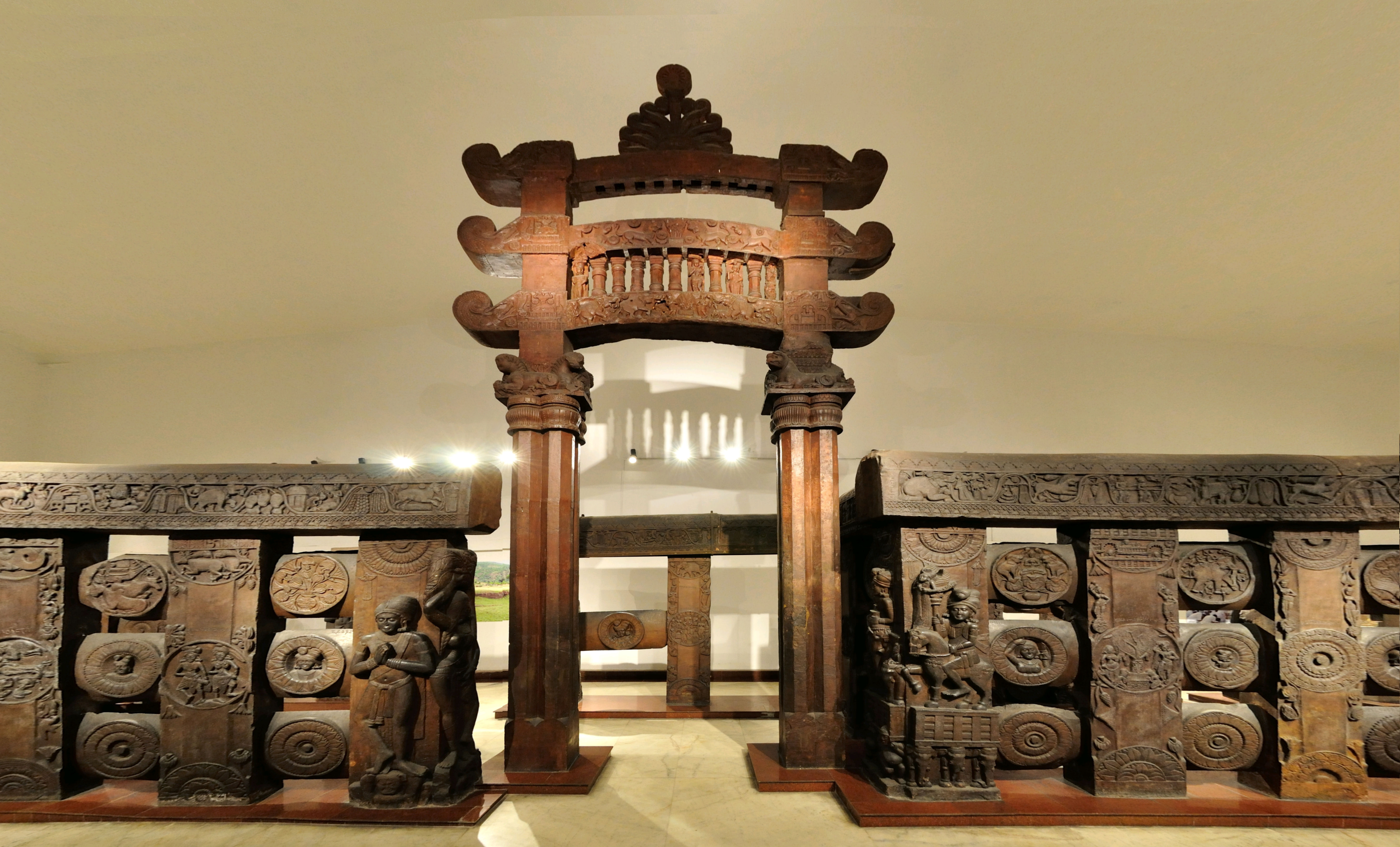
East Gateway and Railings of Bharhut Stupa. Sculptured railings: 115 BCE, toranas: 75 BCE.

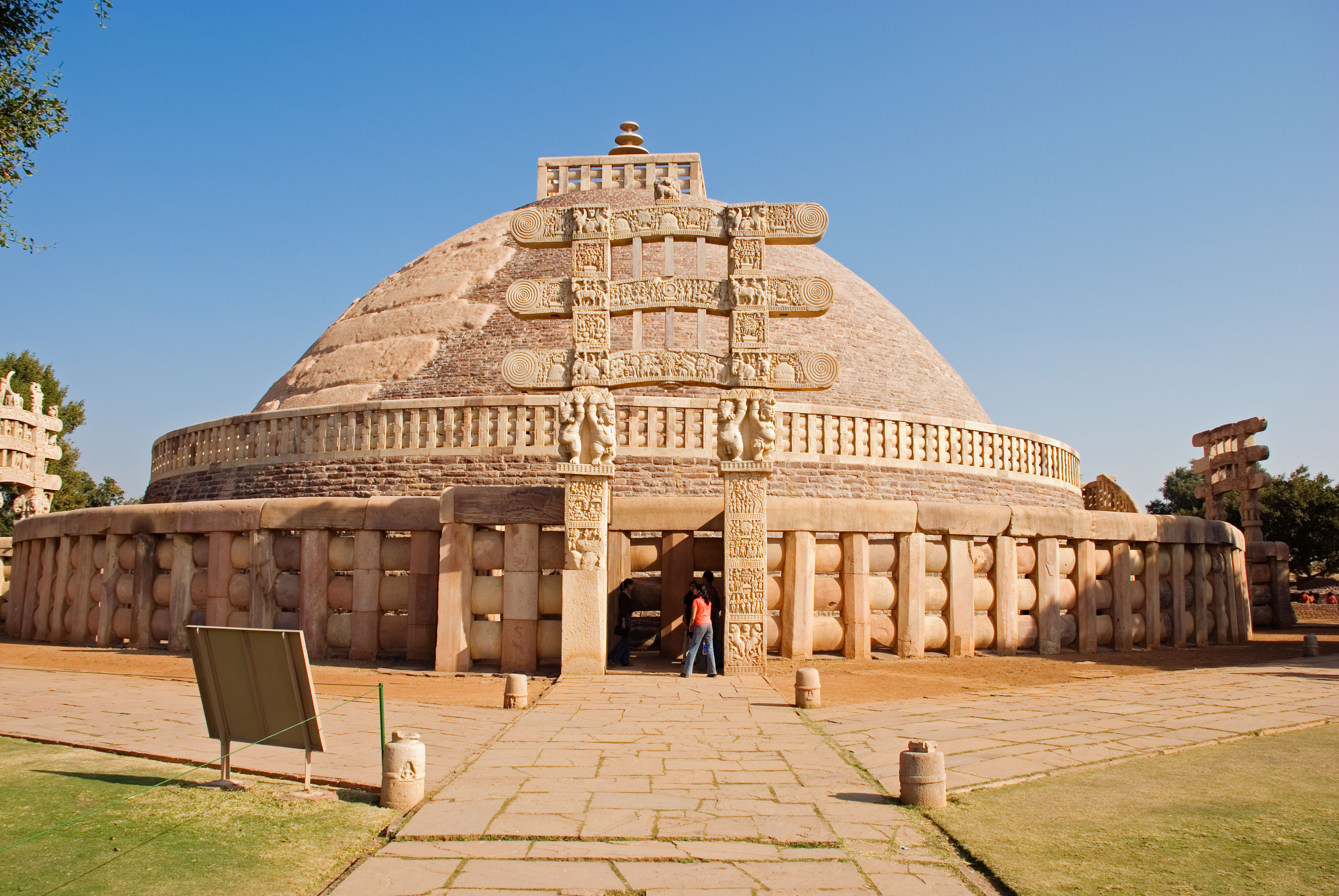
The Great Stupa at Sanchi Decorated toranas built from the 1st c. BCE to the 1st c. CE.

=== Development in Gandhara (3rd century BCE–5th century CE) ===
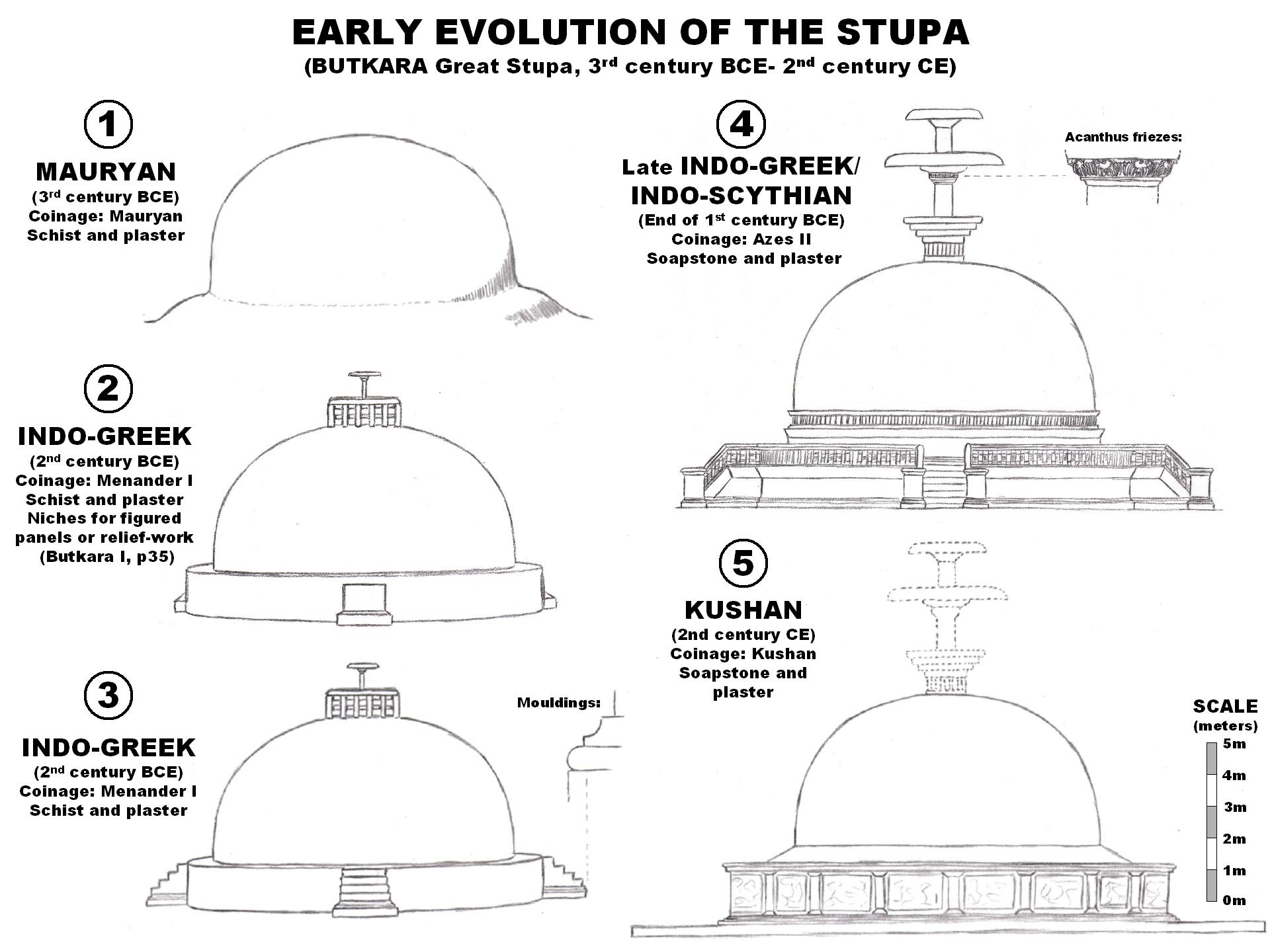
Butkara Stupa in Gandhara

The stupa underwent major evolutions in the area of Gandhara. Since Buddhism spread to Central Asia, China, and ultimately Korea and Japan through Gandhara, the stylistic evolution of the Gandharan stupa was very influential in the later development of the stupa (and related artistic or architectural forms) in these areas. The Gandhara stupa followed several steps, generally moving towards more and more elevation and addition of decorative elements, leading eventually to the development of the pagoda tower. The main stupa types are, in chronological order:

1. The Dharmarajika Stupa, with a near-Indian design of a semi-hemispheric stupa almost directly on the ground surface, probably dated to the 3rd century BCE. Similar stupas are the Butkara Stupa, the Manikyala stupa, or the Chakpat stupa.
2. The Saidu Sharif Stupa, pillared and quincunxial, with a flight of stairs to a dome elevated on a square platform. Many Gandhara miniatures represent this type (1st century CE).
3. The Loriyan Tangai stupa, with an elongated shape and many narrative reliefs, in many ways the classic Gandharan stupa (2nd century CE).
4. The near-pyramidal Jaulian stupa (2nd century CE).
5. The cruciform type, as in the Bhamala Stupa, with flights of stairs in the four cardinal directions (4th century CE).
6. The towering design of the second Kanishka Stupa (4th–5th century CE).
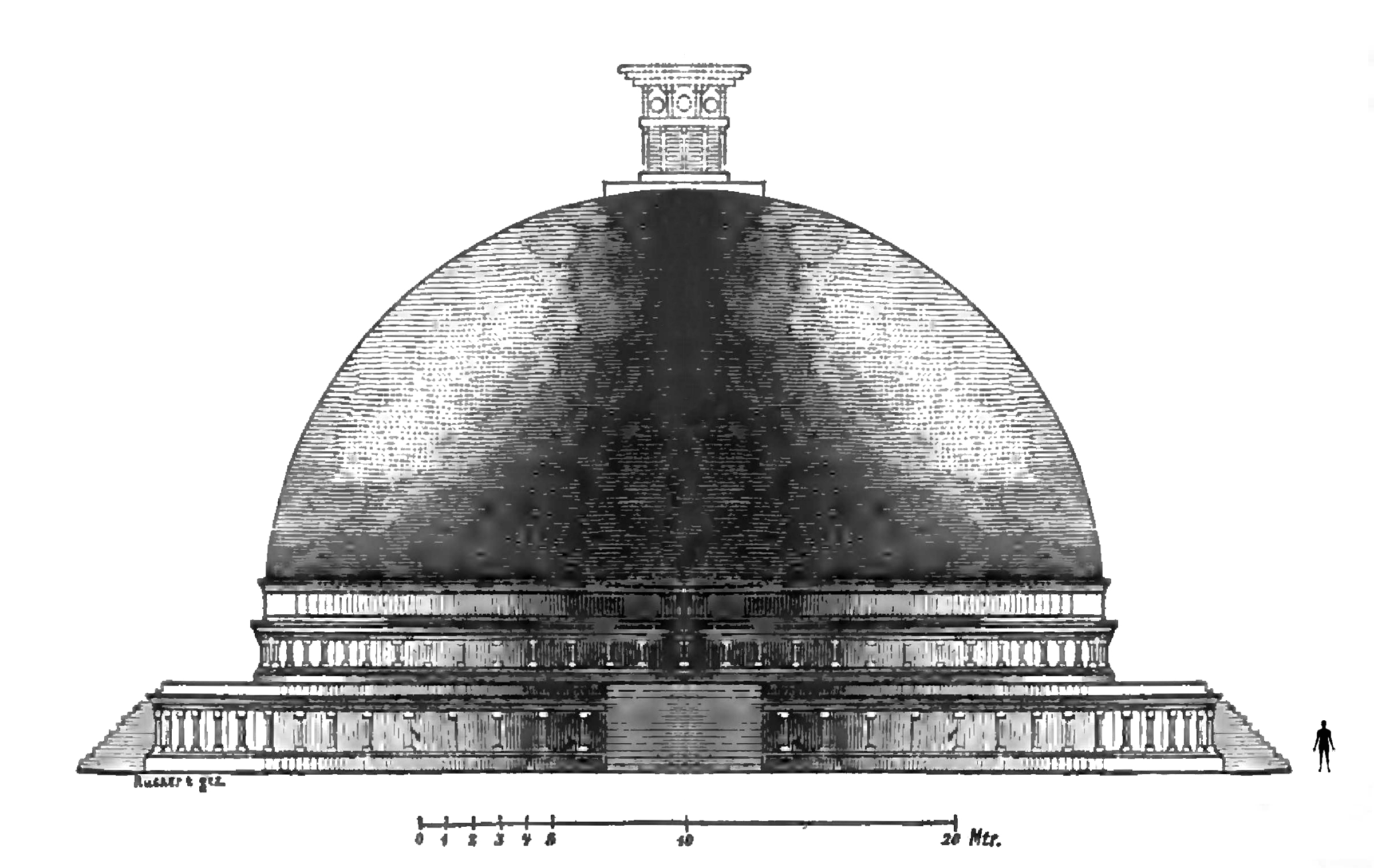
Manikyala Stupa, from the period of Kaniska I

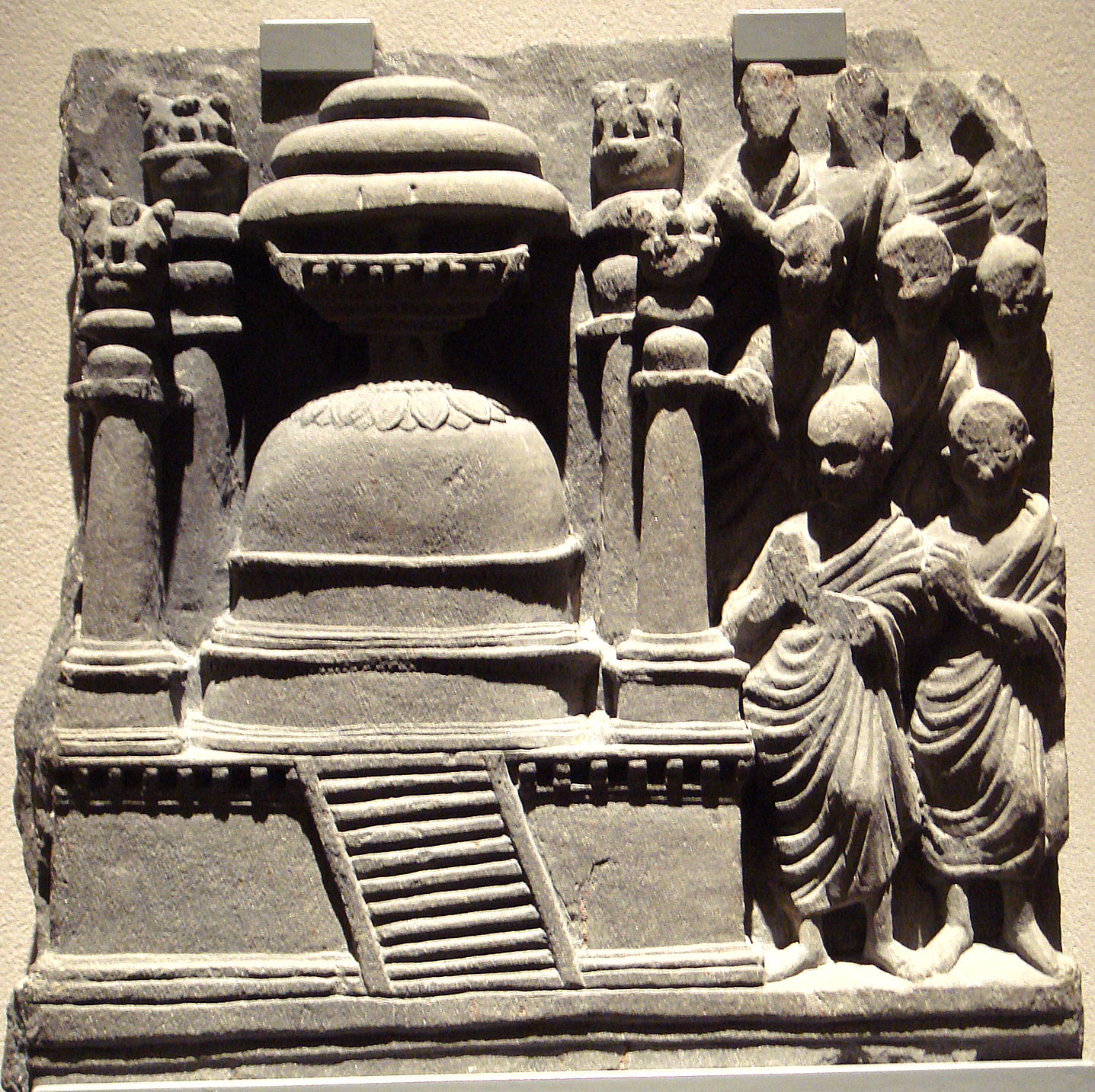
A model resembling the Saidu Sharif Stupa, with square base and four columns (1st century CE).

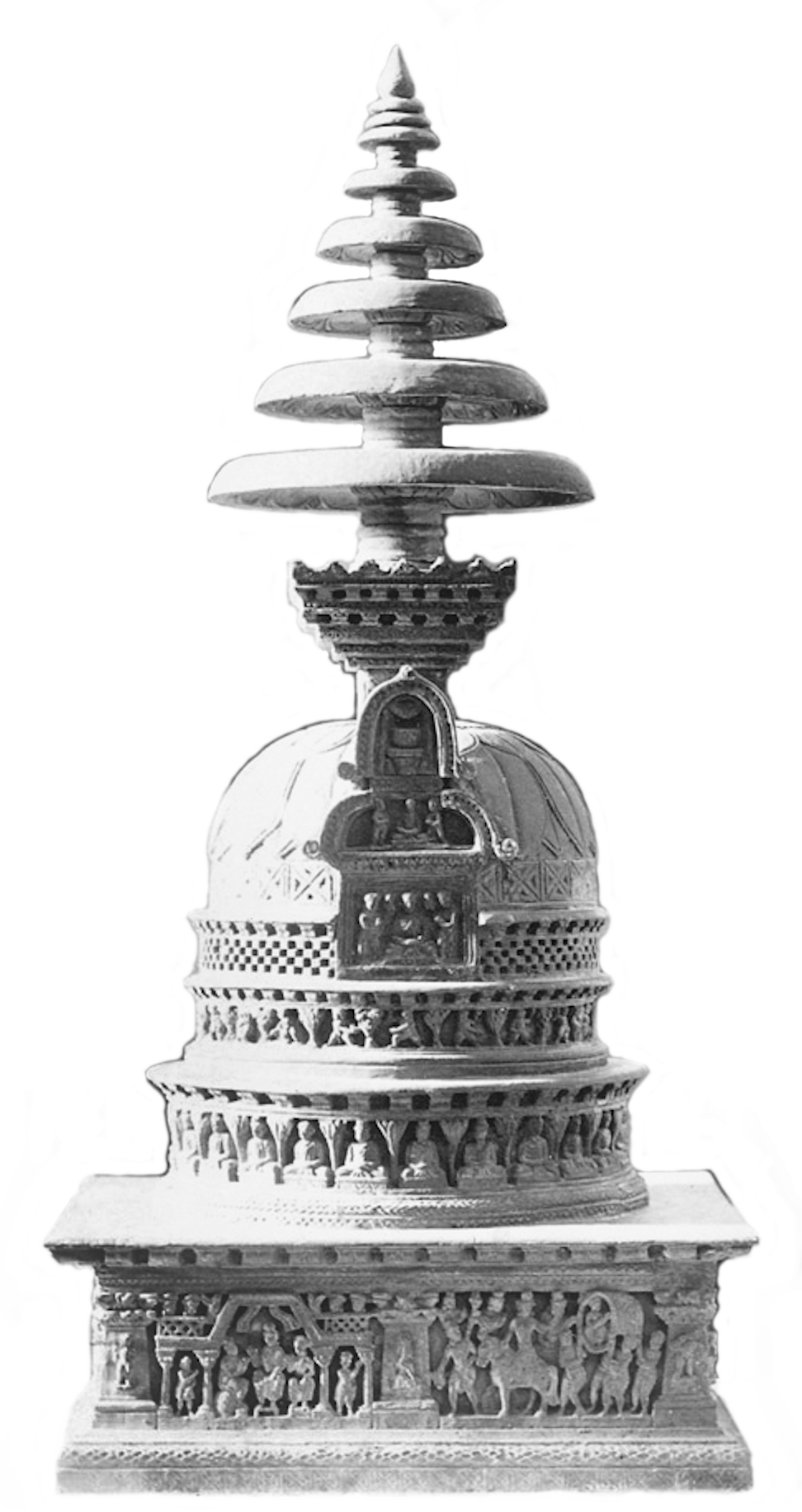
Loriyan Tangai decorated stupa, in the Greco-Buddhist art of Gandhara (2nd century CE).

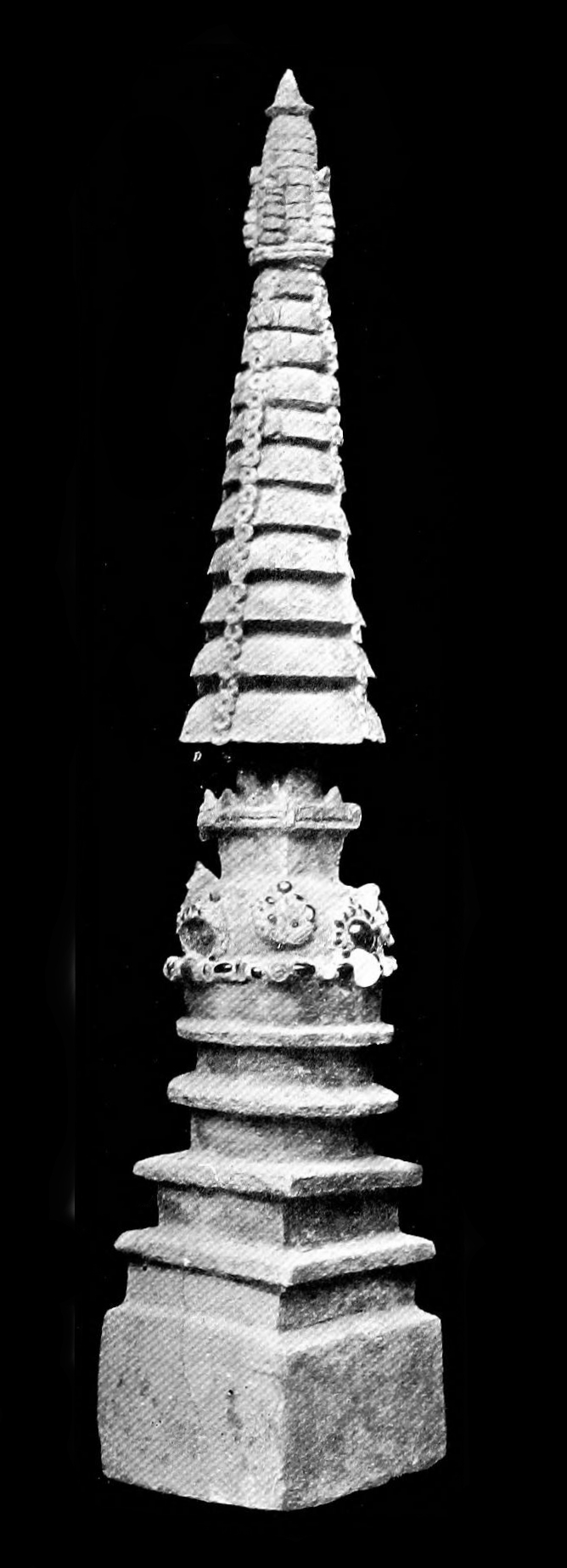
A tower-shaped stupa, thought to be the design of the second (rebuilt) Kanishka Stupa, Jaulian monastery

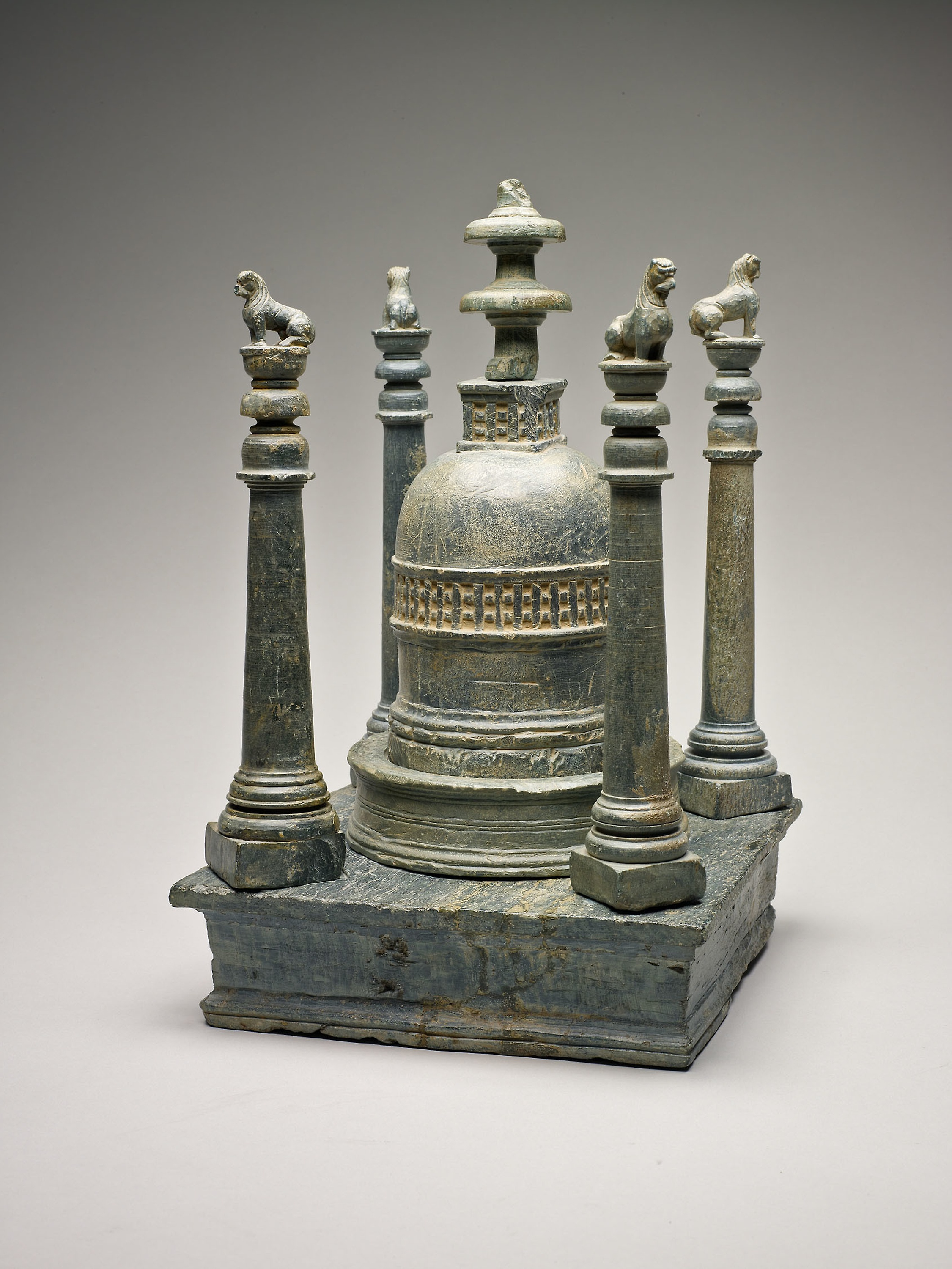
Stupa-shaped reliquary, Kushan period, about 2nd century CE

==== Origin of the pyramidal temple ====
Pyramidal temples

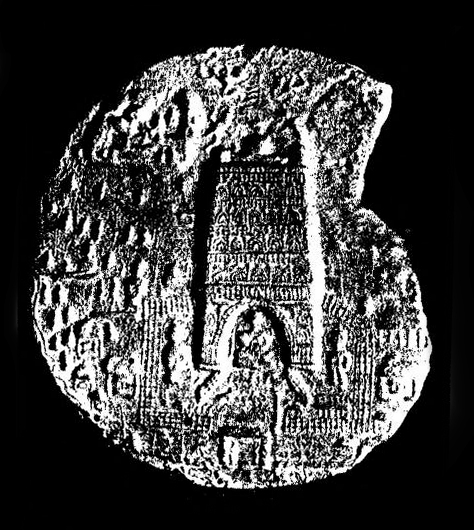
The Mahabodhi Temple in 150–200 CE

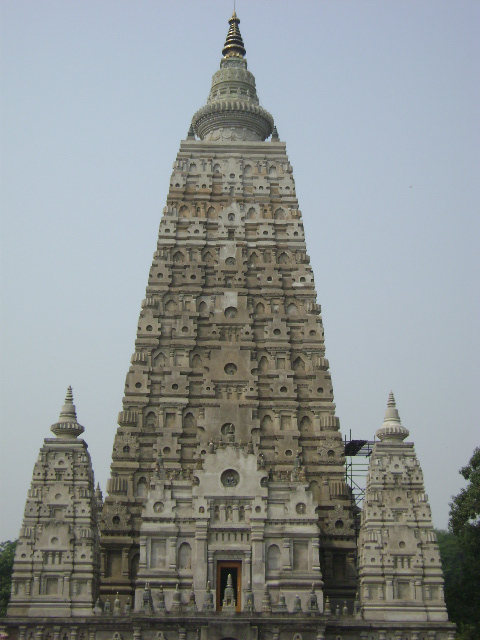
The Mahabodhi Temple: a stepped pyramid with round stupa on top

Model of the sikhara of a Buddhist temple; 900s

It is thought that the temple in the shape of a truncated pyramid may have derived from the design of the stepped stupas that developed in Gandhara. The Mahabodhi Temple in Bodh Gaya is one such example, formed of a succession of steps with niches containing Buddha images, alternating with Greco-Roman pillars. The structure is crowned by the shape of a hemispherical stupa topped by finials, forming a logical elongation of the stepped Gandharan stupas such as those seen in Jaulian.

Although the current structure of the Mahabdhodi Temple dates to the Gupta period (5th century CE), the "Plaque of Mahabhodi Temple", discovered in Kumrahar and dated to 150–200 CE, based on its dated Kharoshthi inscriptions and combined finds of Huvishka coins, suggests that the pyramidal structure already existed in the 2nd century CE. This is confirmed by archaeological excavations in Bodh Gaya.

This truncated pyramid design also marked the evolution from the aniconic stupa dedicated to the cult of relics, to the iconic temple with multiple images of the Buddha and Bodhisattvas. This design was influential in the development of later Hindu temples.

=== Expansion in Asia ===
==== Asian stupas ====
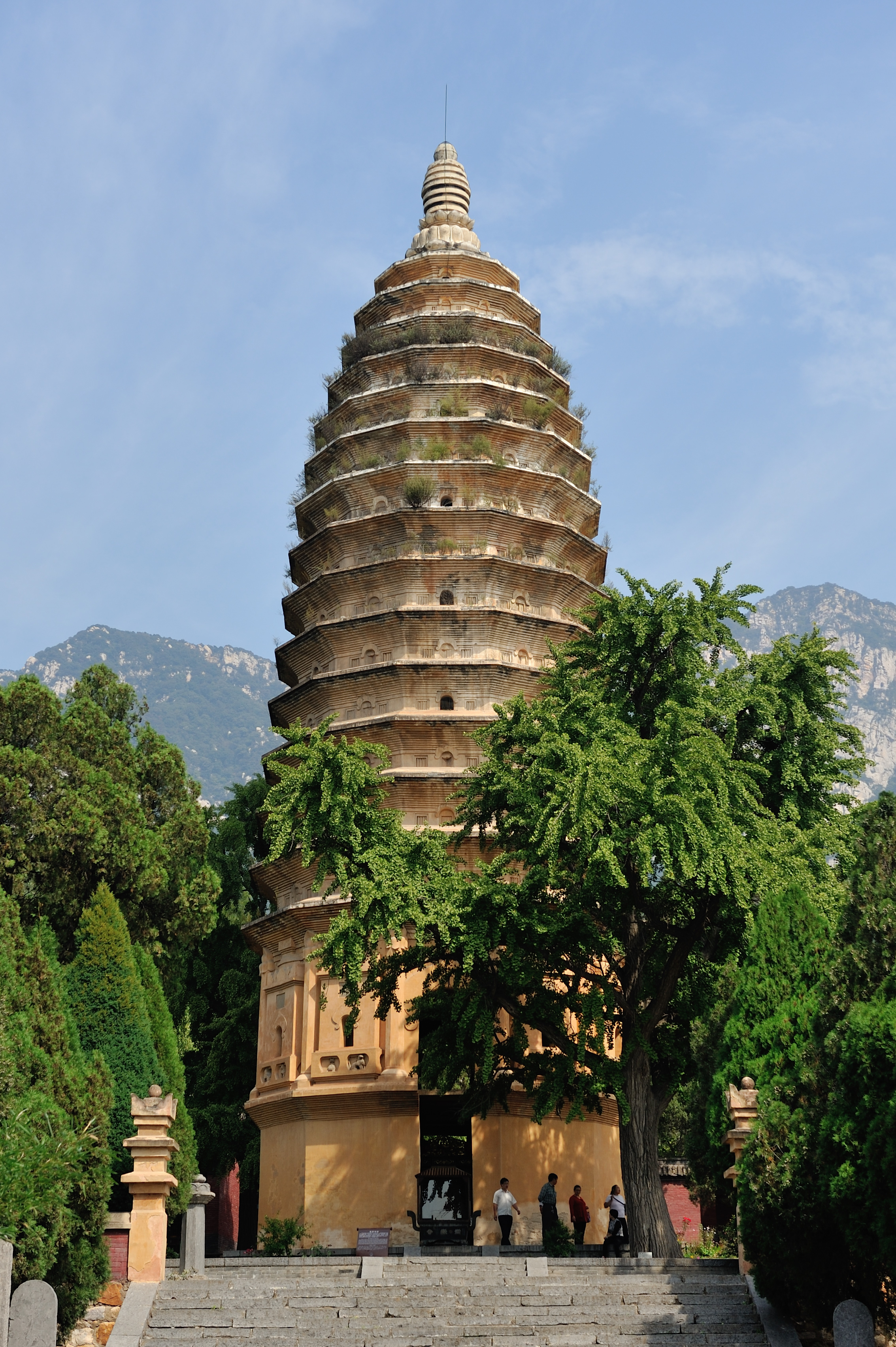
The Chinese Songyue Pagoda (523 CE) is thought to derive from the Gandharan tower-stupa model.

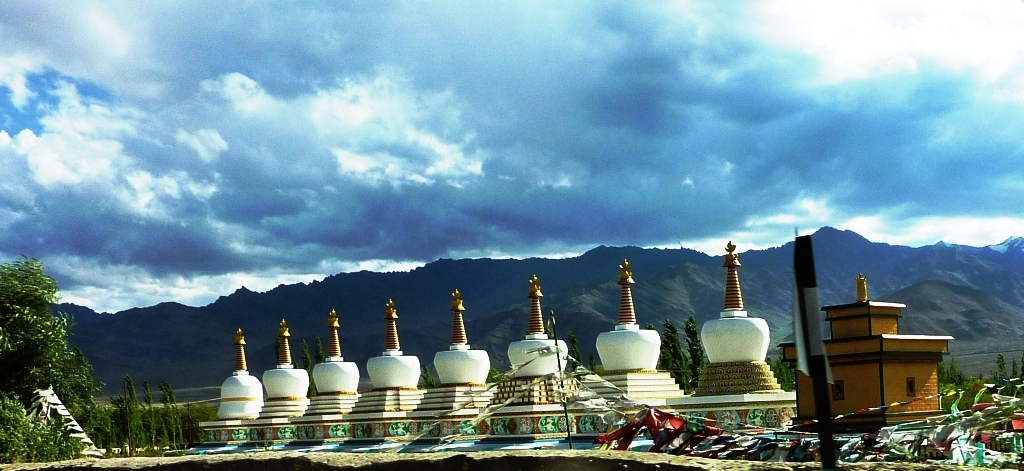
Row of chorten stupas on roadside east of Leh, Ladakh

Stupa architecture was adopted in Southeast and East Asia, where it became prominent as a Buddhist monument used for enshrining sacred relics. The Indian gateway arches, torana, reached East Asia with the spread of Buddhism. Some scholars hold that torii derives from the torana gates at the Buddhist historic site of Sanchi (3rd century BCE–11th century CE). In Tibet, the stupa became the chorten, and the pagoda in East Asia.

The pagoda has varied forms that also include bell-shaped and pyramidal styles. In the Western context, there is no clear distinction between a stupa and a pagoda. In general, however, "stupa" is the term used for a Buddhist structure in India or Southeast Asia, while "pagoda" refers to a building in East Asia that can be entered and that may be used for secular purposes. However, use of the term varies by region. For example, stupas in Burma tend to be referred to as "pagodas".

Stupas were built in Sri Lanka soon after Devanampiya Tissa of Anuradhapura converted to Buddhism. The first was the Thuparamaya. Later, many more were built over the years, including the Jetavanaramaya in Anuradhapura.

==== Development of the pagoda ====
The Asian words for pagoda (tā in Chinese, t'ap in Korean, tháp in Vietnamese, tō in Japanese) are all thought to derive from the Pali word for stupa, thupa, with the Sanskrit pronunciation being stupa. In particular the type of the tower-like stupa, the last stage of Gandharan stupa development, visible in the second Kanishka Stupa (4th century), is thought to be the precursor of the tower stupas in Turkestan and the Chinese pagodas such as Songyue Pagoda (523 CE).

== Notable stupas ==
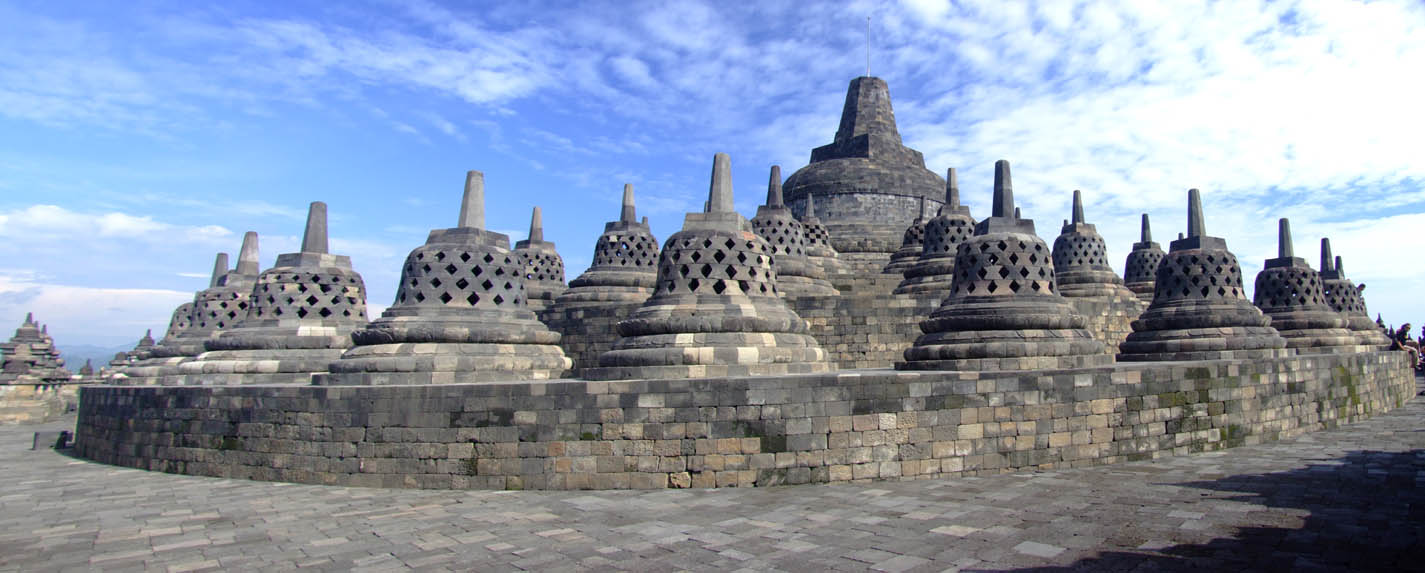
Borobudur bell-shaped stupas

The earliest archaeological evidence for the presence of Buddhist stupas dates to the late 4th century BCE. Some of the oldest known examples of stupas are found in Vaishali, Kushinagar, Piprahwa, Ramgram, Sanchi, Sarnath, Amaravati, and Bharhut.

With the top of its spire reaching 120.45 m (395.2 ft) in height, Phra Pathommachedi in Nakhon Pathom, Thailand is the second tallest extant stupa in the world. The Swat Valley hosts a well-preserved stupa at Shingardar near Ghalegay; another stupa is located near Barikot and Dharmarajika-Taxila in Pakistan. In Sri Lanka, the ancient city of Anuradhapura includes some of the tallest, most ancient, and best-preserved stupas in the world, such as Ruwanwelisaya.

The most elaborate stupa is the 8th-century Borobudur monument in Java, Indonesia. The upper rounded terrace, with rows of bell-shaped stupas, contain Buddha images symbolizing Arūpajhāna, the sphere of formlessness. The main stupa itself is empty, symbolizing complete perfection of enlightenment. The main stupa is the crown part of the monument, while the base is a pyramidal structure elaborated with galleries adorned with bas-relief scenes derived from Buddhist texts and depicting the life of Gautama Buddha. Borobudur's unique and significant architecture has been acknowledged by UNESCO as the largest Buddhist monument in the world. It is also the world's largest Buddhist temple as well as one of the greatest Buddhist monuments in the world.

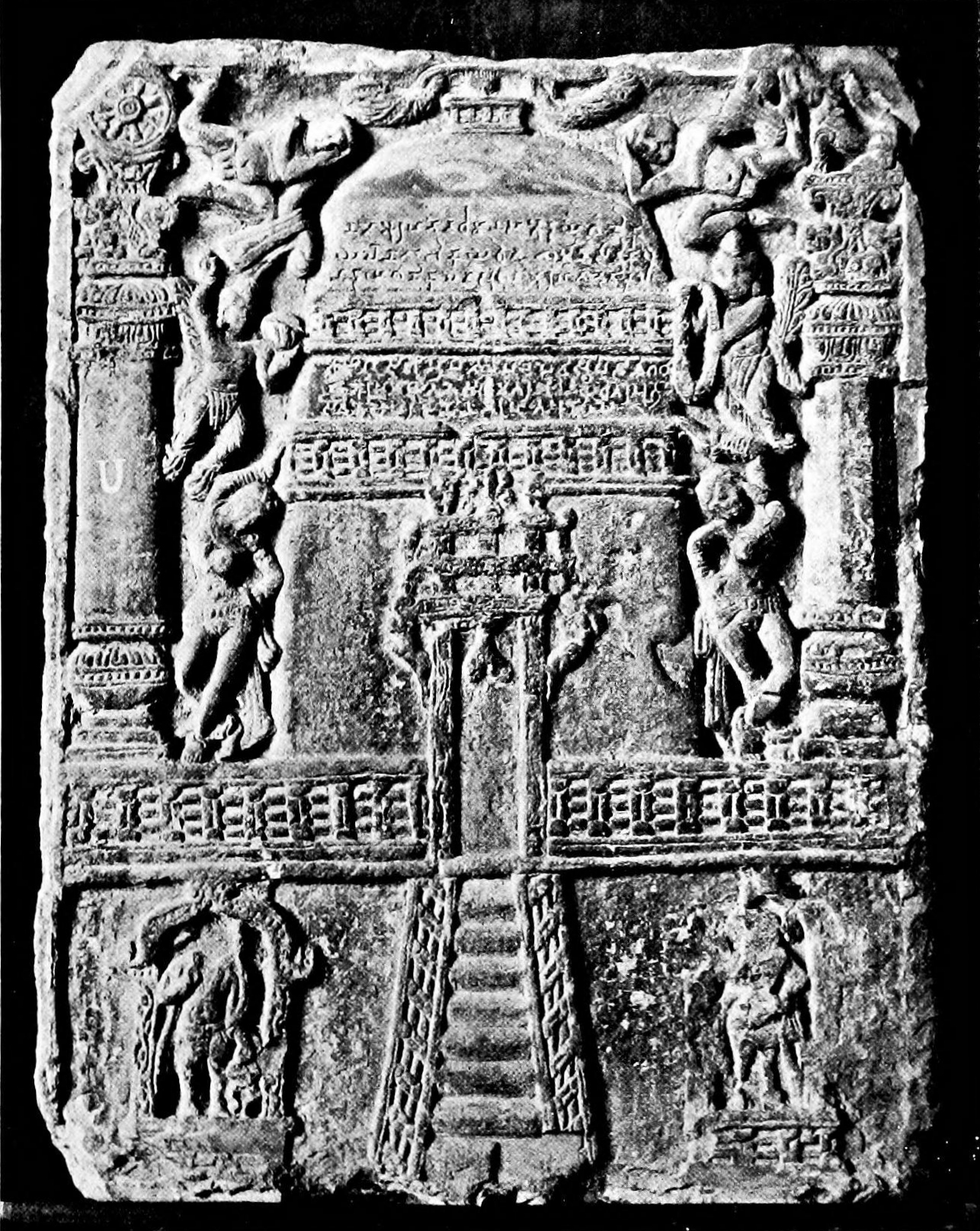
Vasu Śilāpaṭa, Jain stupa, Mathura, 1st century CE

A Jain stupa was excavated at Mathura in the 19th century.

The Shwedagon Pagoda in Yangon, Myanmar, is one of the largest stupas in the world.

=== European stupas ===
The Benalmádena Stupa is the tallest stupa in Europe. It is 33 m (108 ft) high and was inaugurated on 5 October 2003, the final project of Buddhist master Lopon Tsechu Rinpoche. Lopon Tsechu built his first stupa at Karma Guen near Málaga, in 1994, a symbol of peace and prosperity for Spain. He went on to build 16 more stupas in Europe before his death in 2003.

A stupa was built on the ground of the Kalachakra Kalapa Centre in southwest Styria, Austria, between 2000 and 2002.

A stupa based on the bell-shaped stupas at Borobudur is located at Amaravati Buddhist Monastery, near Hemel Hempstead, in the UK.

=== Types of stupas ===
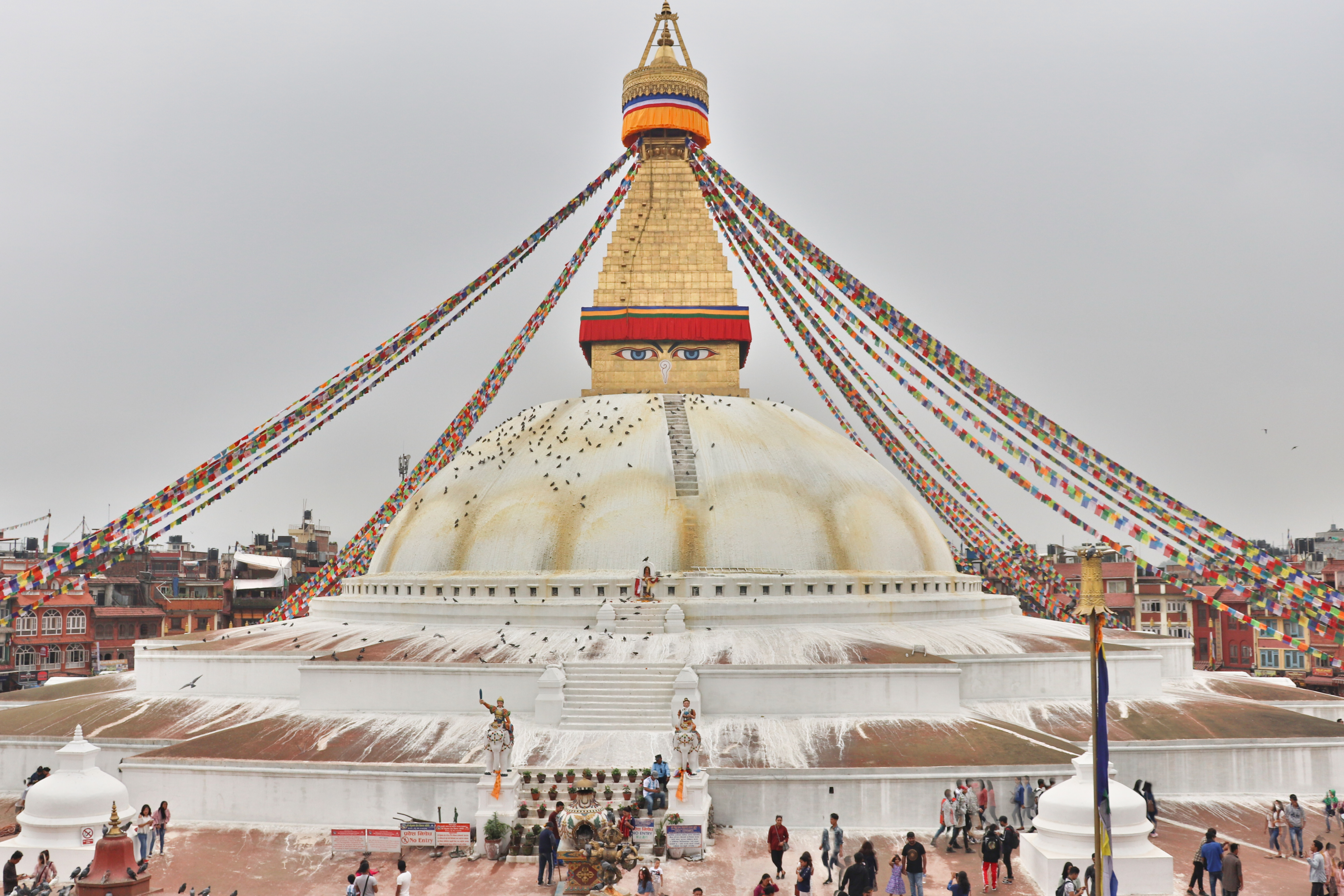
Boudhanath Stupa, Kathmandu, Nepal

Built for a variety of reasons, Buddhist stupas are classified, based on form and function, into five types:

- Relic stupa, in which the relics or remains of the Buddha, his disciples, and lay saints are interred
- Object stupa, in which the items interred are objects that belonged to the Buddha or his disciples, such as a begging bowls or robes, or important Buddhist scriptures.
- Commemorative stupa, built to commemorate events in the lives of Buddha or his disciples
- Symbolic stupa, to symbolise aspects of Buddhist theology. For example, Borobudur is considered to be the symbol of "the Three Worlds (dhatu) and the spiritual stages (bhumi) in a Mahayana bodhisattva's character".
- Votive stupa, constructed to commemorate visits or to gain spiritual benefits, usually at the site of prominent stupas that are regularly visited.

== Symbolism ==
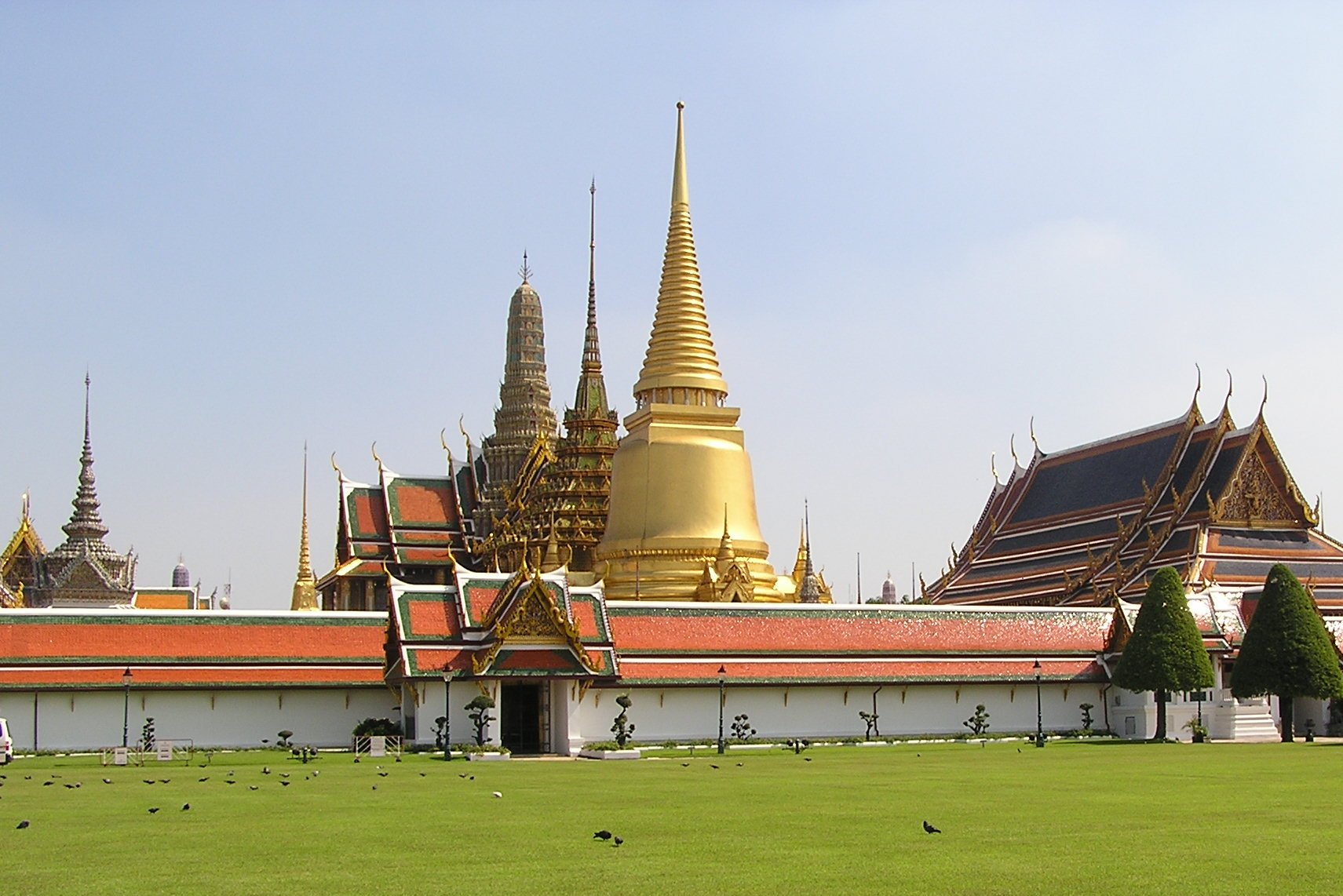
View of the Wat Phra Kaew complex in Bangkok, Thailand, from the northeast

"The shape of the stupa represents the Buddha, crowned and sitting in meditation posture on a lion throne. His crown is the top of the spire; his head is the square at the spire's base; his body is the vase shape; his legs are the four steps of the lower terrace; and the base is his throne."

=== Five purified elements ===
Although not described in any Tibetan text on stupa symbolism, the stupa may represent the five purified elements, according to Buddhism:

- The square base represents Earth.
- The hemispherical dome/vase represents water.
- The conical spire represents fire.
- The upper lotus parasol and the crescent moon represent air.
- The sun and the dissolving point represent wisdom.

== Construction ==
To build a stupa, Dharma transmission and ceremonies known to a Buddhist teacher are necessary. The type of stupa to be constructed in a certain area is decided together with the teacher assisting in the construction. Sometimes the type chosen is directly connected with events that have taken place in the area.

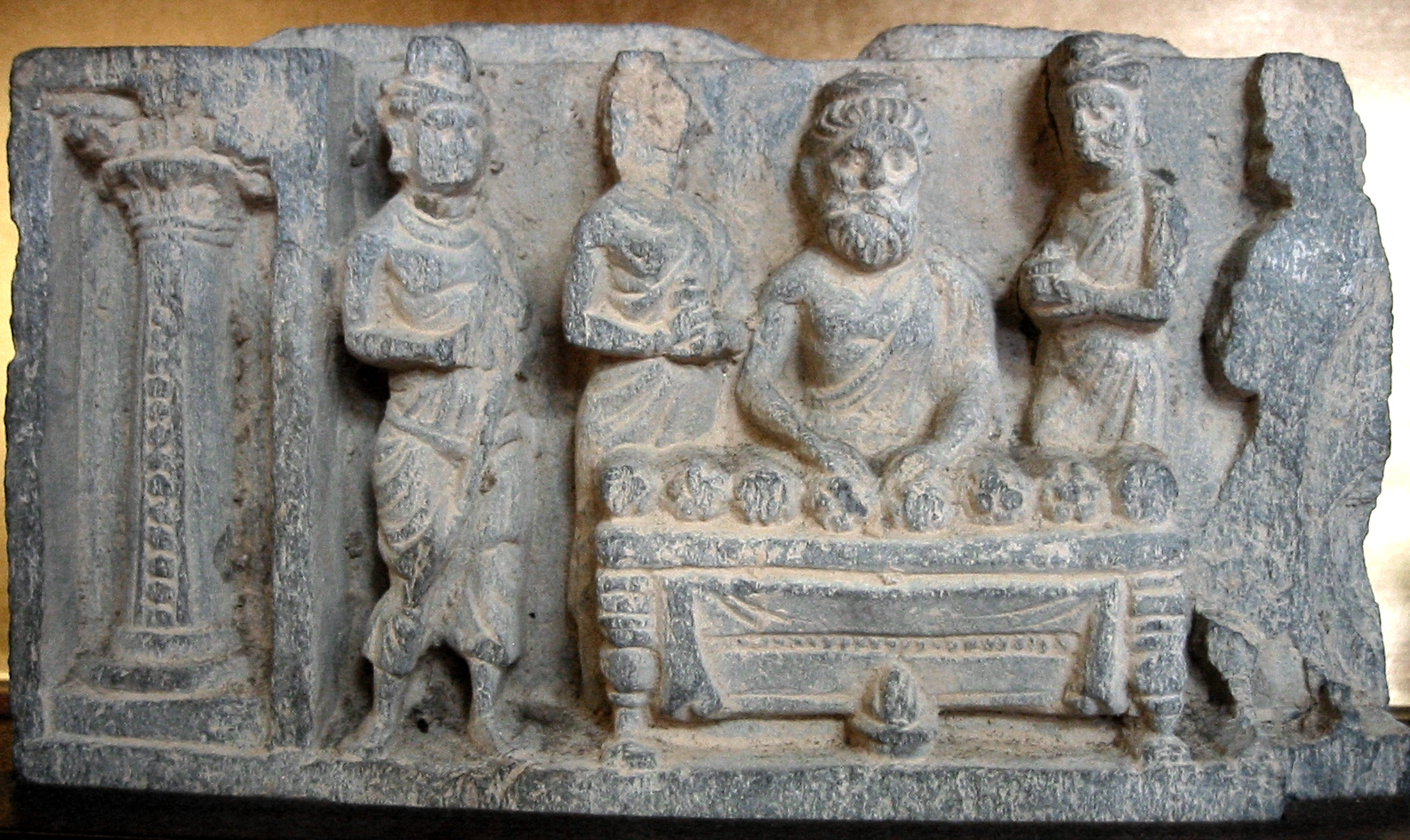
The sharing of the relics of the Buddha. Greco-Buddhist art of Gandhara, 2nd–3rd century CE. ZenYouMitsu Temple Museum, Tokyo.

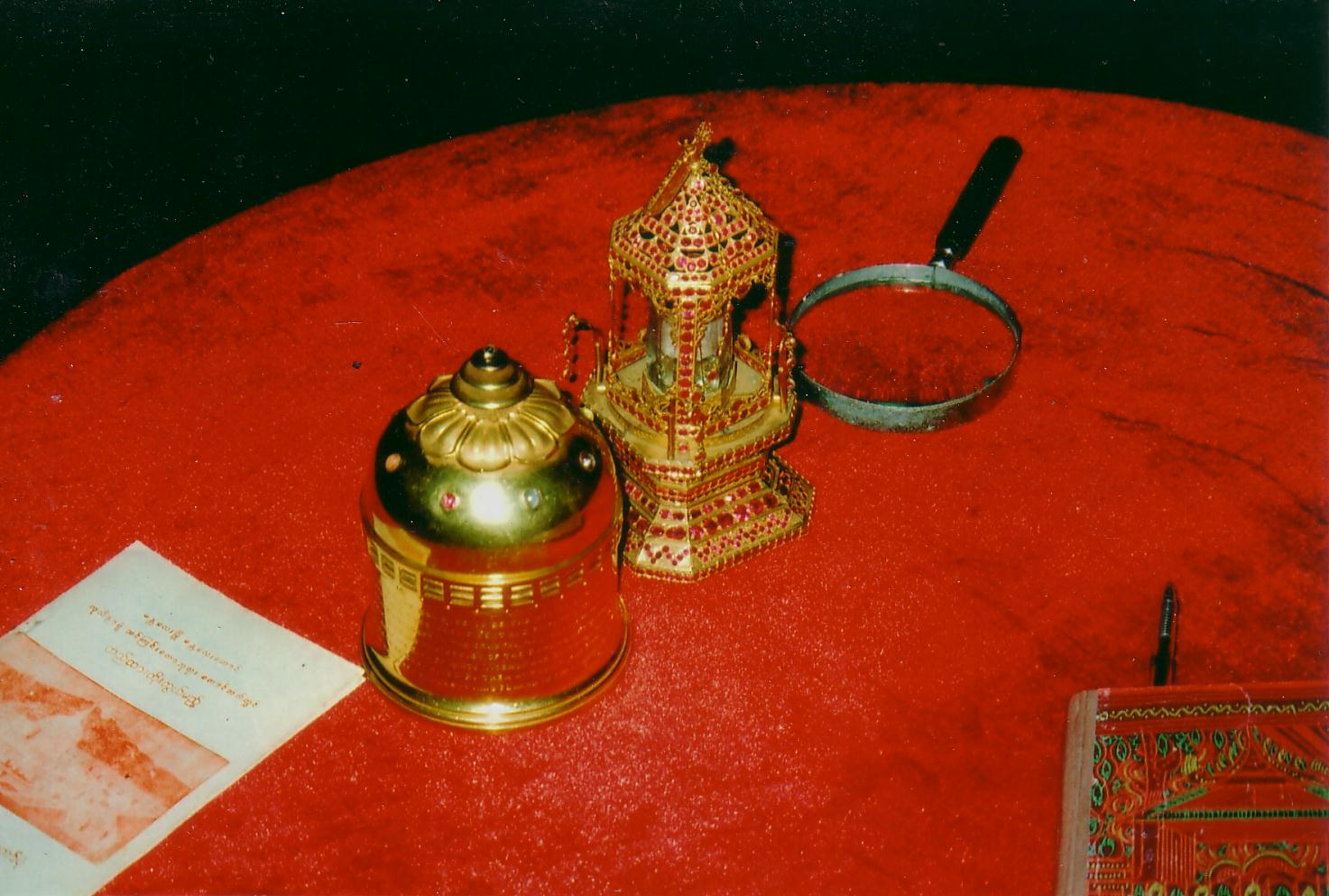
Buddha relics from the Kanishka stupa in Peshawar, Pakistan. These surviving relics are now housed in Mandalay, Myanmar.

=== Treasury ===
All stupas contain a treasury filled with various objects. Small clay votive offerings called tsatsas in Tibetan fill most of the treasury. The creation of the tsatsas is itself a ceremony. Mantras written on paper are made into thin rolls and put into small clay stupas. One layer of tsatsas is placed in the treasury, and the empty space between them is filled with dry sand. On the thus-created new surface, another layer of tsatsas is made, and so on, until the entire space of the treasury is full.

The number of tsatsas required to completely fill the treasury depends on its size and the size of the tsatsa. For example, the Kalachakra stupa in southern Spain contains approximately 14,000 tsatsas.

Jewellery and other "precious" objects are also placed in the treasury. It is not necessary that they be expensive, since it is the symbolic value that is important, not the market price. It is believed that the more objects are placed in the stupa, the stronger its energy.

=== Tree of Life ===
An important element in every stupa is the "Tree of Life". This is a wooden pole covered with gems and thousands of mantras; it is placed in the central channel of the stupa. It is positioned during a ceremony or initiation, where the participants hold colorful ribbons connected to the Tree of Life. Together, the participants make their most positive and powerful wishes, which are stored in the Tree of Life. In this way, the stupa is charged and starts to function.

=== Benefits ===
In Buddhist tradition, building a stupa is believed to leave positive karmic imprints in the mind. According to these beliefs, this action results in fortunate rebirths. Traditional texts also attribute worldly benefits to the practice, such as being born into a rich family, having an attractive body, a nice voice, bringing joy to others, and having a long and happy life in which one's wishes are quickly fulfilled. The practice is viewed as a path toward reaching enlightenment.

Destroying a stupa, on the other hand, is considered an extremely negative deed, similar to murder. Such an action is said to create massive negative karmic imprints, leading to serious future problems. It is said this action leaves the mind in a state of paranoia after death has occurred, leading to unfortunate rebirths.

== Tibetan stupas ==
The Eight Great Stupas

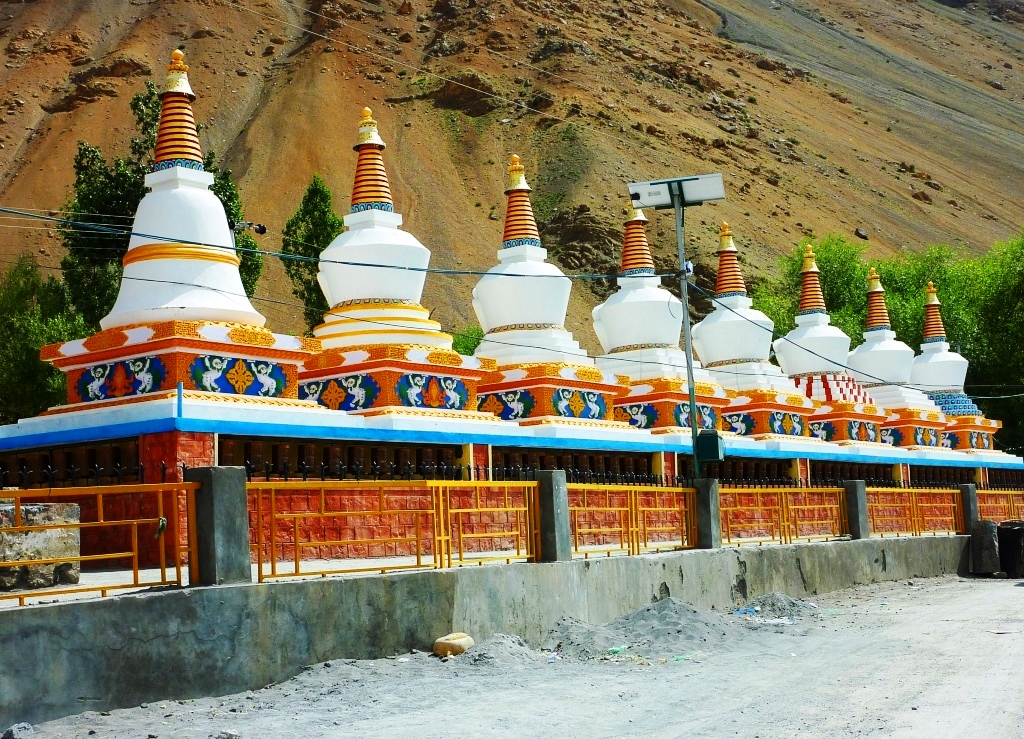
Row of chortens at roadside near Leh, Ladakh

Stupas in Tibet and Tibetan-influenced regions of the Himalayas, such as Bhutan, are usually called "chorten" in English, reflecting the term in the Tibetan language. There are eight different shapes of chortens in Tibetan Buddhism, each referring to a major event in the Buddha's life. Chortens are often made as a set, placed in a row. The Tibetan set differs slightly (by two events) from the Indian set of Eight Great Events in the Life of Buddha.

=== Lotus Blossom Stupa ===
Also known as "Stupa of Heaped Lotuses", or "Birth of the Sugata Stupa", this stupa refers to the birth of Gautama Buddha. "At birth Buddha took seven steps in each of the four directions" (east, south, west, and north). In each direction, lotuses sprang up, symbolizing the brahmaviharas: love, compassion, joy, and equanimity. The base of this stupa is circular and has four steps, and it is decorated with lotus-petal designs. Occasionally, seven heaped lotus steps are constructed. These refer to the seven first steps of the Buddha.

=== Enlightenment Stupa ===
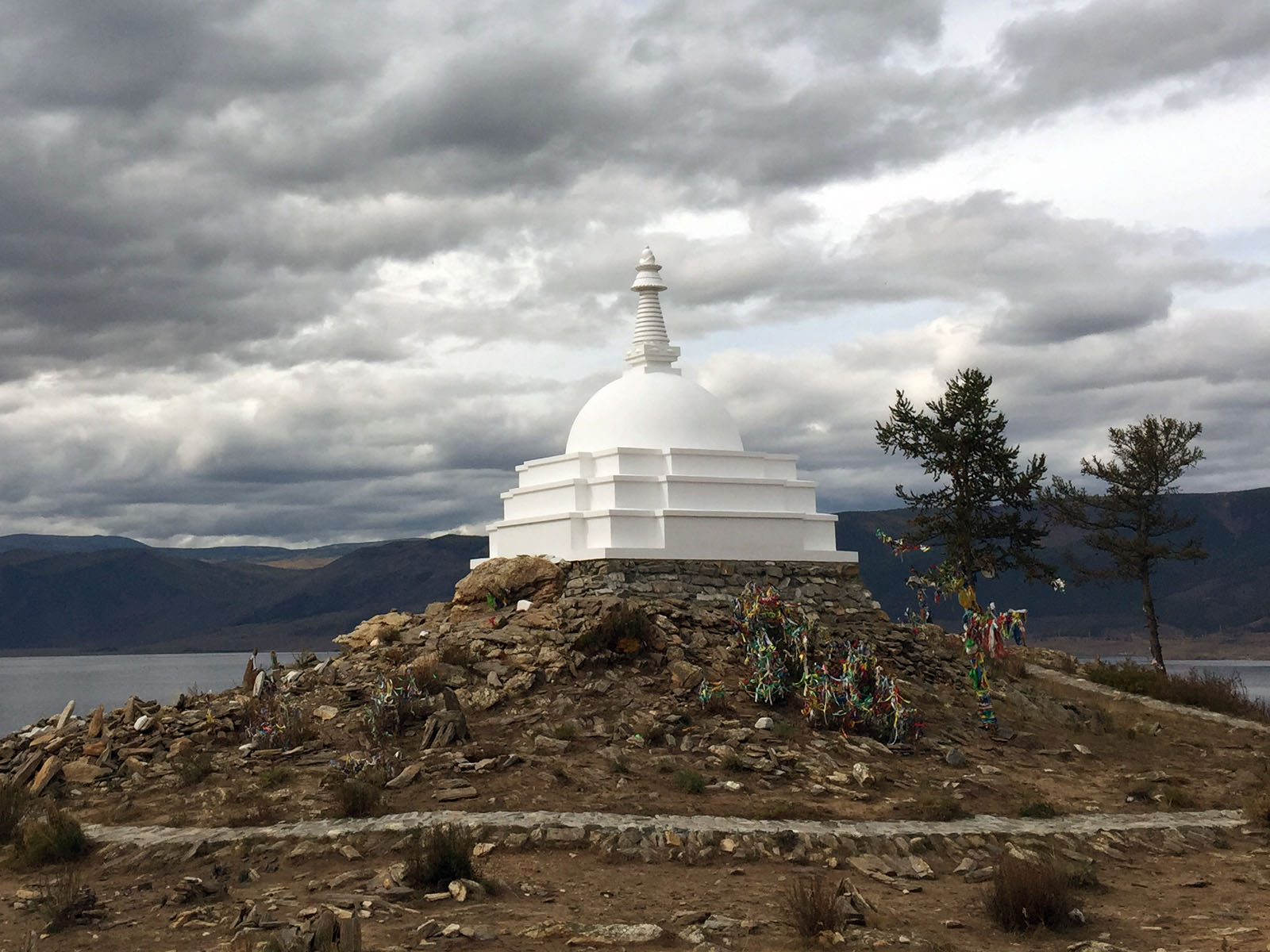
Enlightenment Stupa at Ogoy Island, Russia

Also known as the "Stupa of the Conquest of Mara", this stupa symbolizes the 35-year-old Buddha's attainment of enlightenment under the bodhi tree in Bodh Gaya, where he conquered worldly temptations and attacks, manifesting in the form of Mara.

=== Stupa of Many Doors ===
This stupa is also known as the "Stupa of Many Gates". After reaching enlightenment, the Buddha taught his first students in a deer park near Sarnath. The series of doors on each side of the steps represents the first teachings: the Four Noble Truths, the Six Pāramitās, the Noble Eightfold Path, and the Twelve Nidānas.

=== Stupa of Descent from the God Realm ===
At 42 years of age, Buddha spent a summer retreat in the Tuṣita Heaven, where his mother had taken rebirth. In order to repay her kindness, he taught the dharma to her rebirth. Local inhabitants built a stupa in Sankassa in order to commemorate this event. This type of stupa is characterized by having a central projection at each side, containing a triple ladder, or steps.

=== Stupa of Great Miracles ===
Also known as the "Stupa of Conquest of the Tirthikas", this stupa refers to various miracles performed by the Buddha when he was 50 years old. Legend claims that he overpowered maras and heretics by engaging them in intellectual arguments and also by performing miracles. This stupa was raised by the Lichavi kingdom to commemorate the event.

=== Stupa of Reconciliation ===
This stupa commemorates the Buddha's resolution of a dispute among the sangha. A stupa in this design was built in the kingdom of Magadha, where the reconciliation occurred. It has four octagonal steps with equal sides.

=== Stupa of Complete Victory ===
This stupa commemorates Buddha's successful prolonging of his life by three months. It has only three steps, which are circular and unadorned.

=== Stupa of Nirvana ===
This stupa refers to the parinirvana, or death of the Buddha, when he was 80 years old. It symbolizes his complete absorption into the highest state of mind. It is bell-shaped and usually unornamented.

== Kalachakra stupa ==
A ninth kind of stupa exists, the Kalachakra stupa. Its symbolism is not connected to events in the Buddha's life but instead to the symbolism of the Kalachakra Tantra, created to protect against negative energies.

== Gallery ==
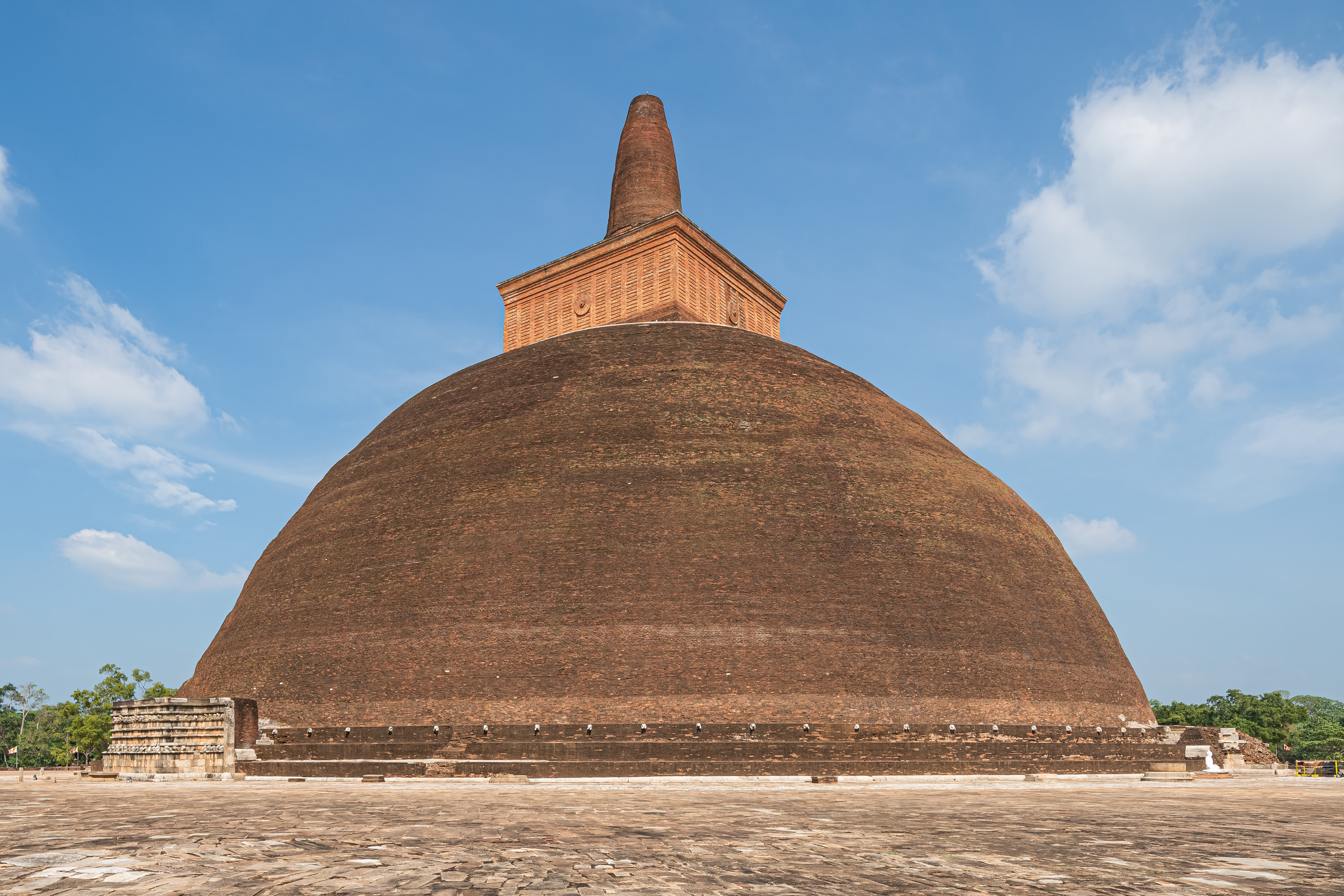
Abhayagiri Vihāra, Sri Lanka

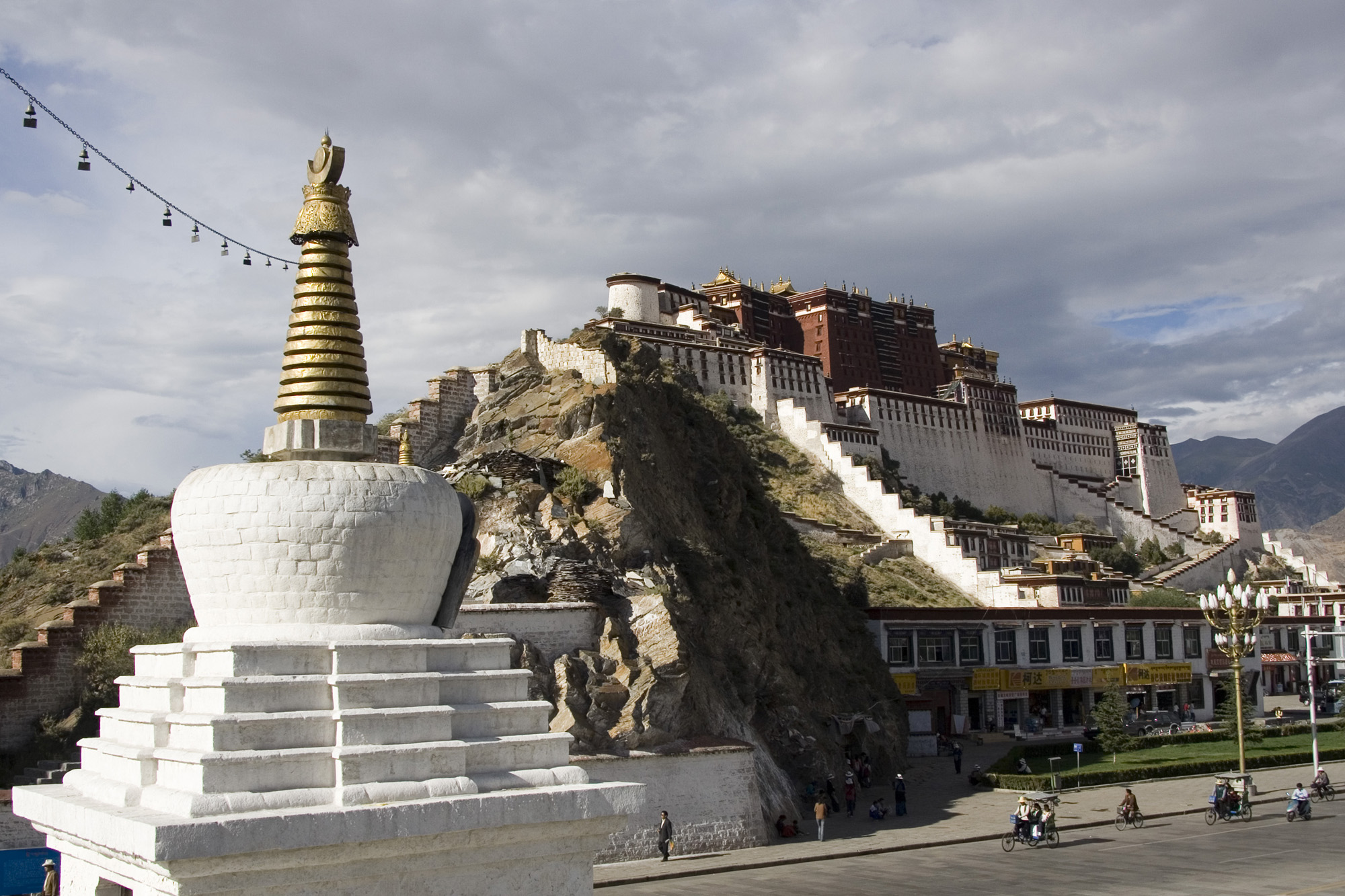
Chorten near Potala Palace, Lhasa, Tibet

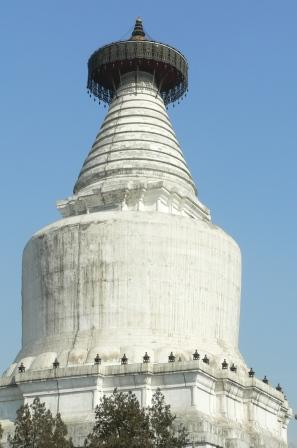
The white stupa in Miaoying Temple, China

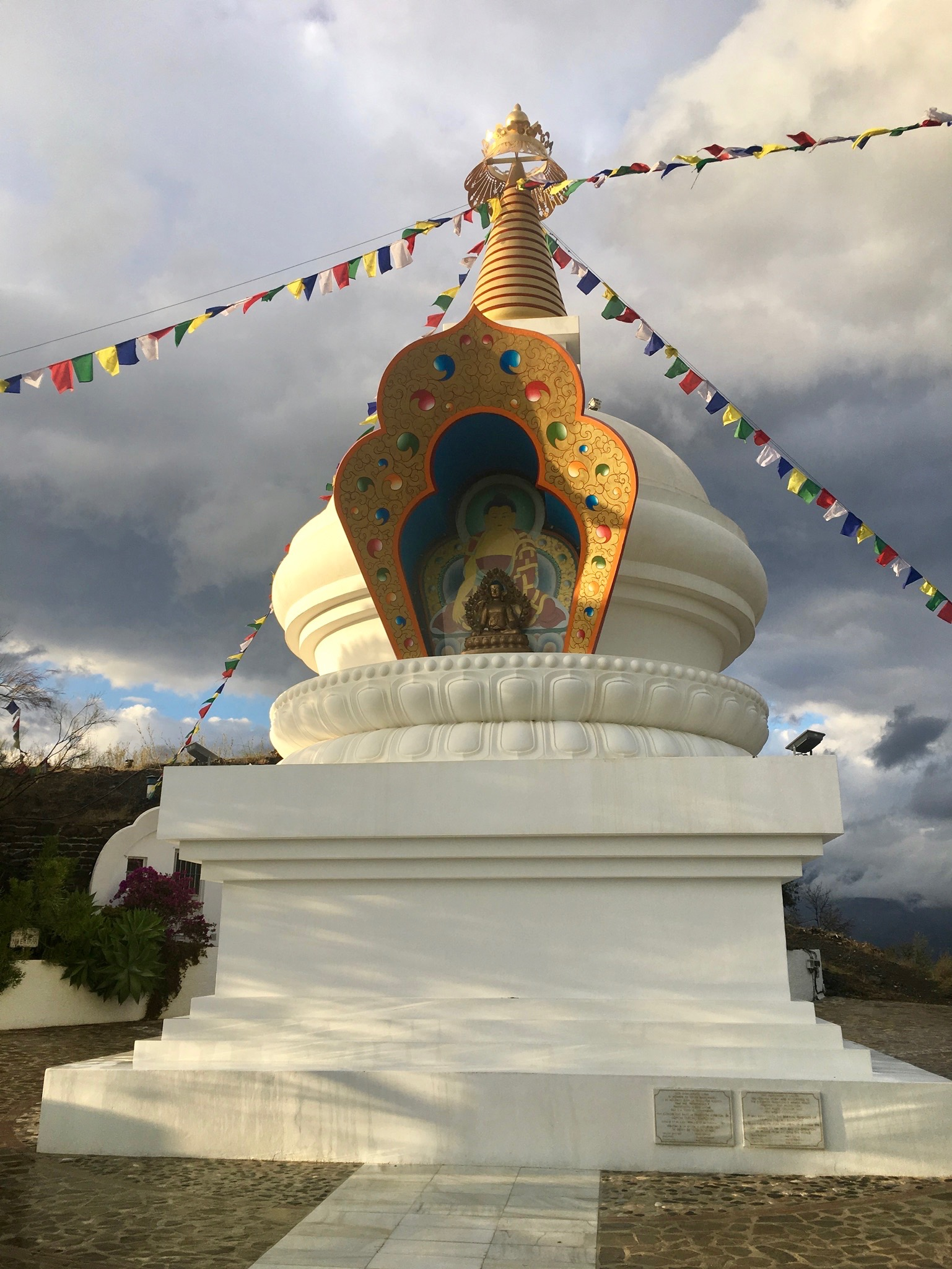
The Kalachakra stupa in Karma Guen, Spain

=== Cambodia ===
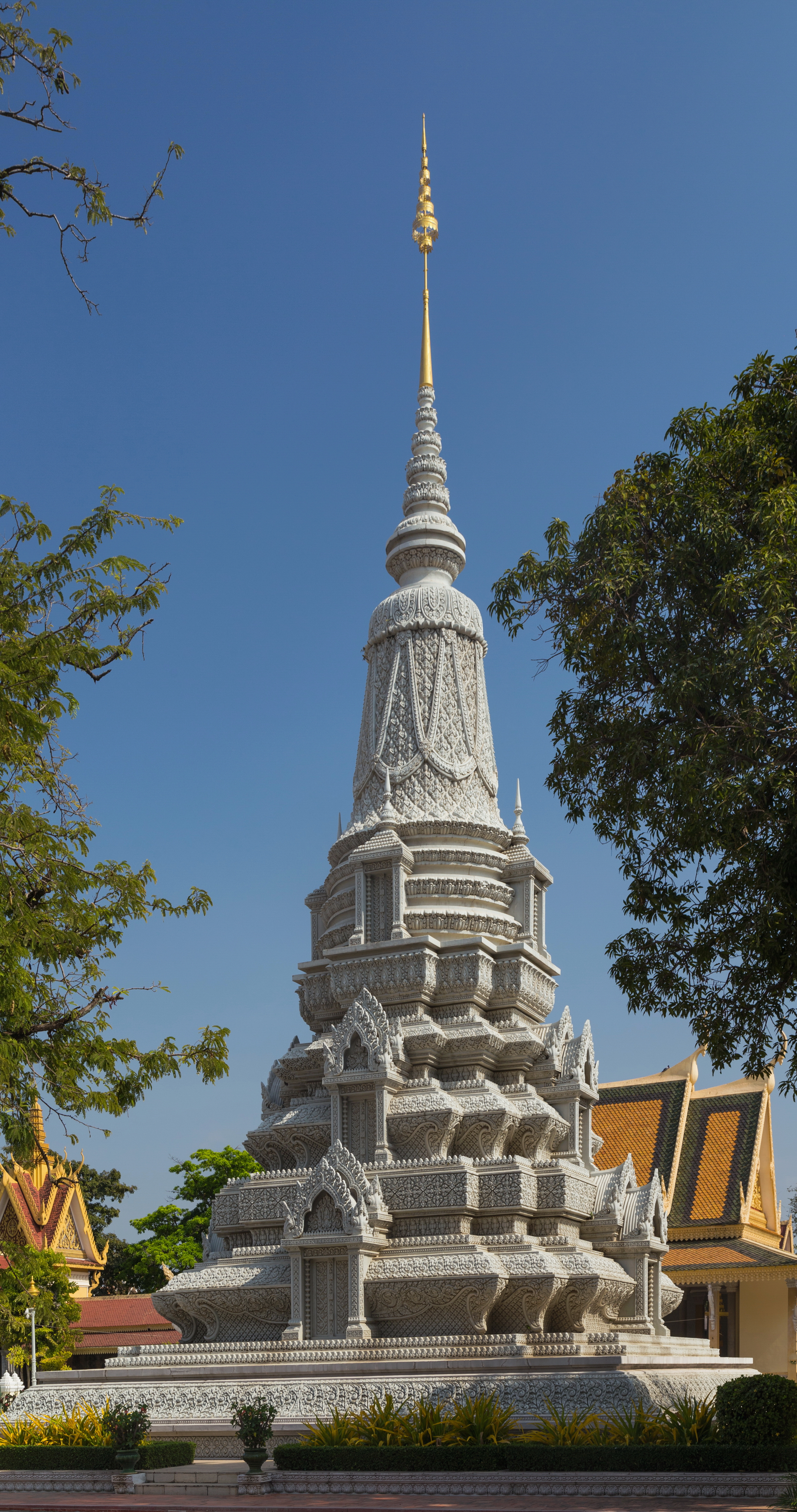
Stupa of King Norodom Suramarit, Royal Palace compound, Phnom Penh

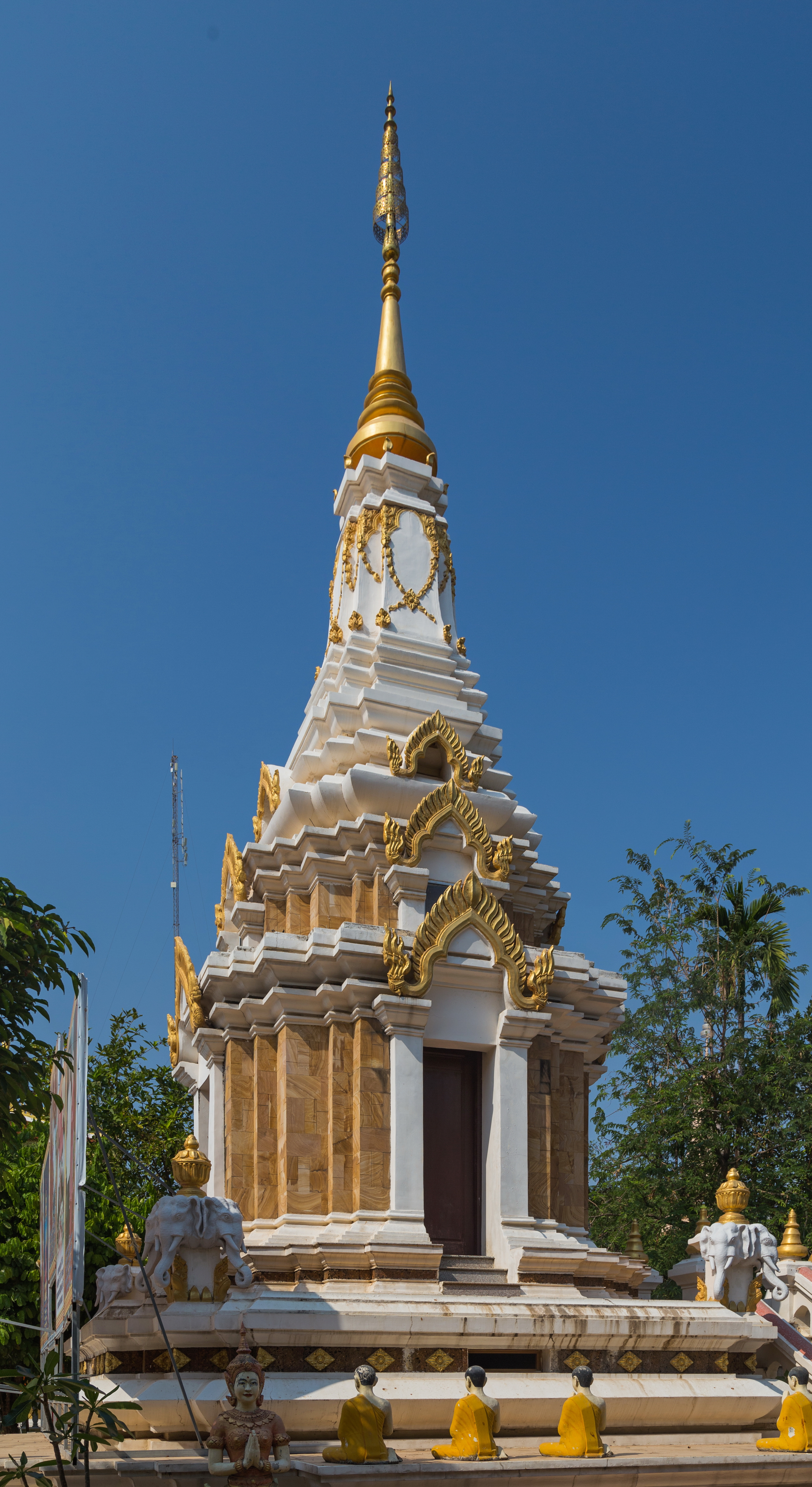
Stupa at Wat Botum in Phnom Penh

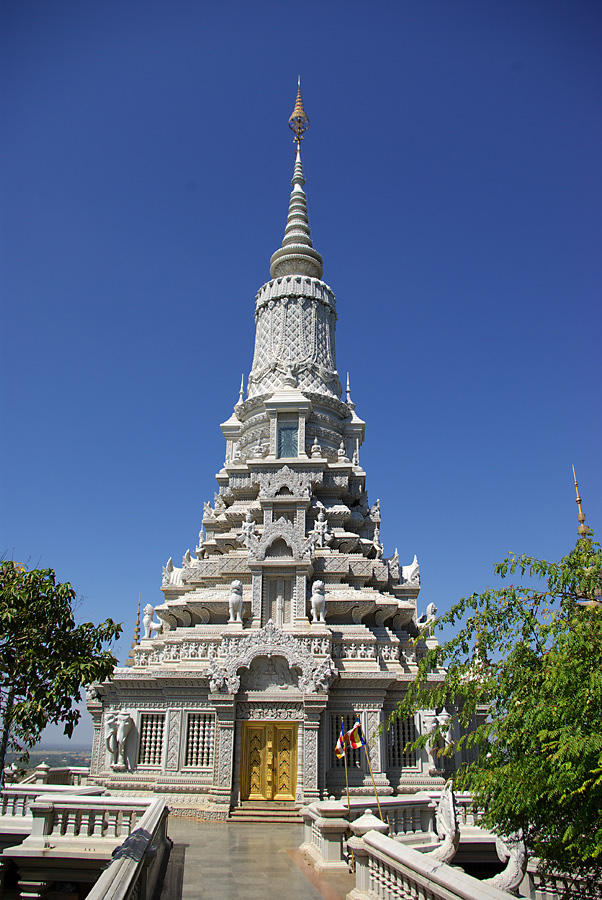
Stupa at Oudong

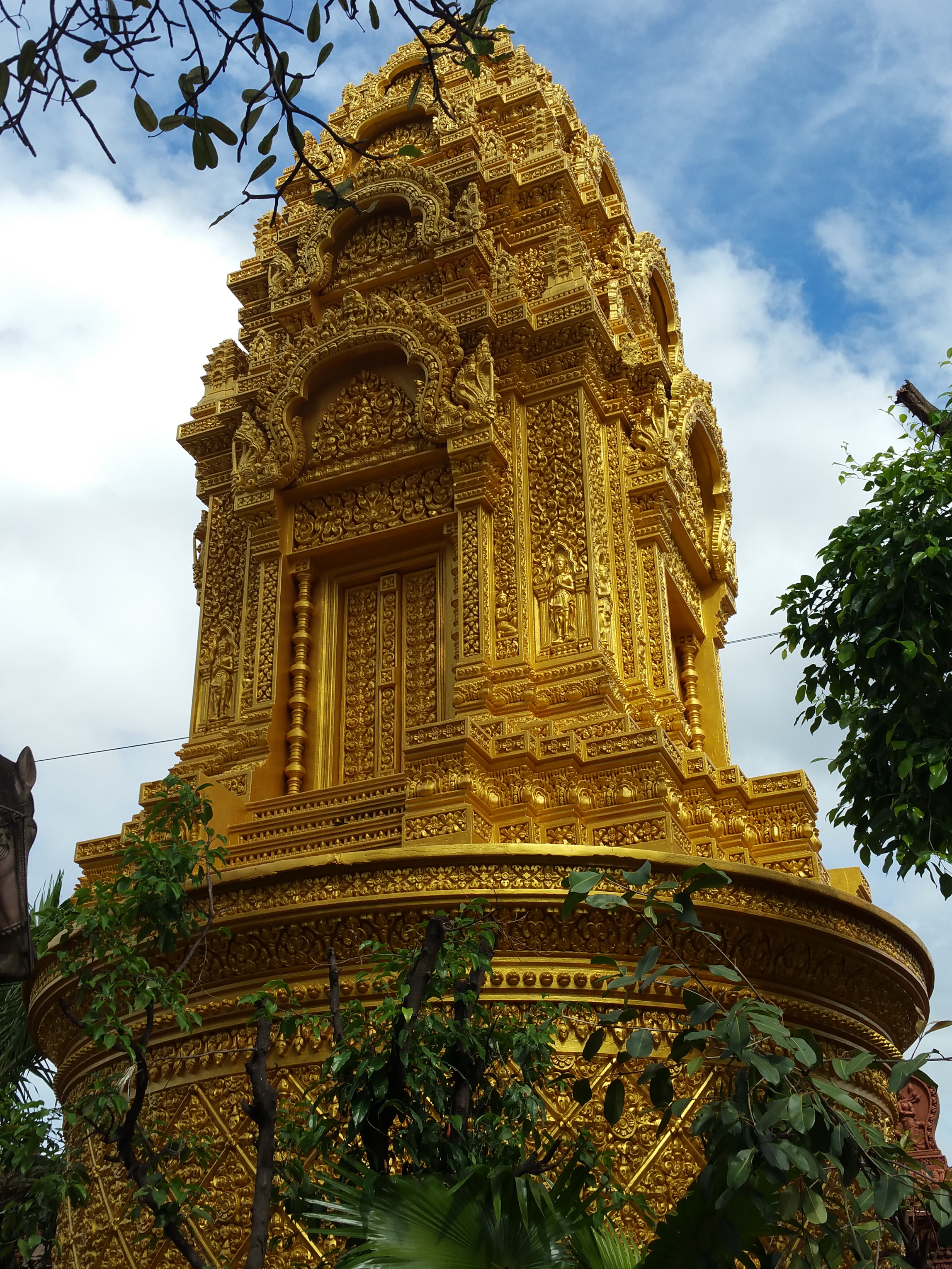
Golden stupa at Wat Ounalom in Phnom Penh

=== Nepal ===
Swayambhunath, hilltop west of Kathmandu

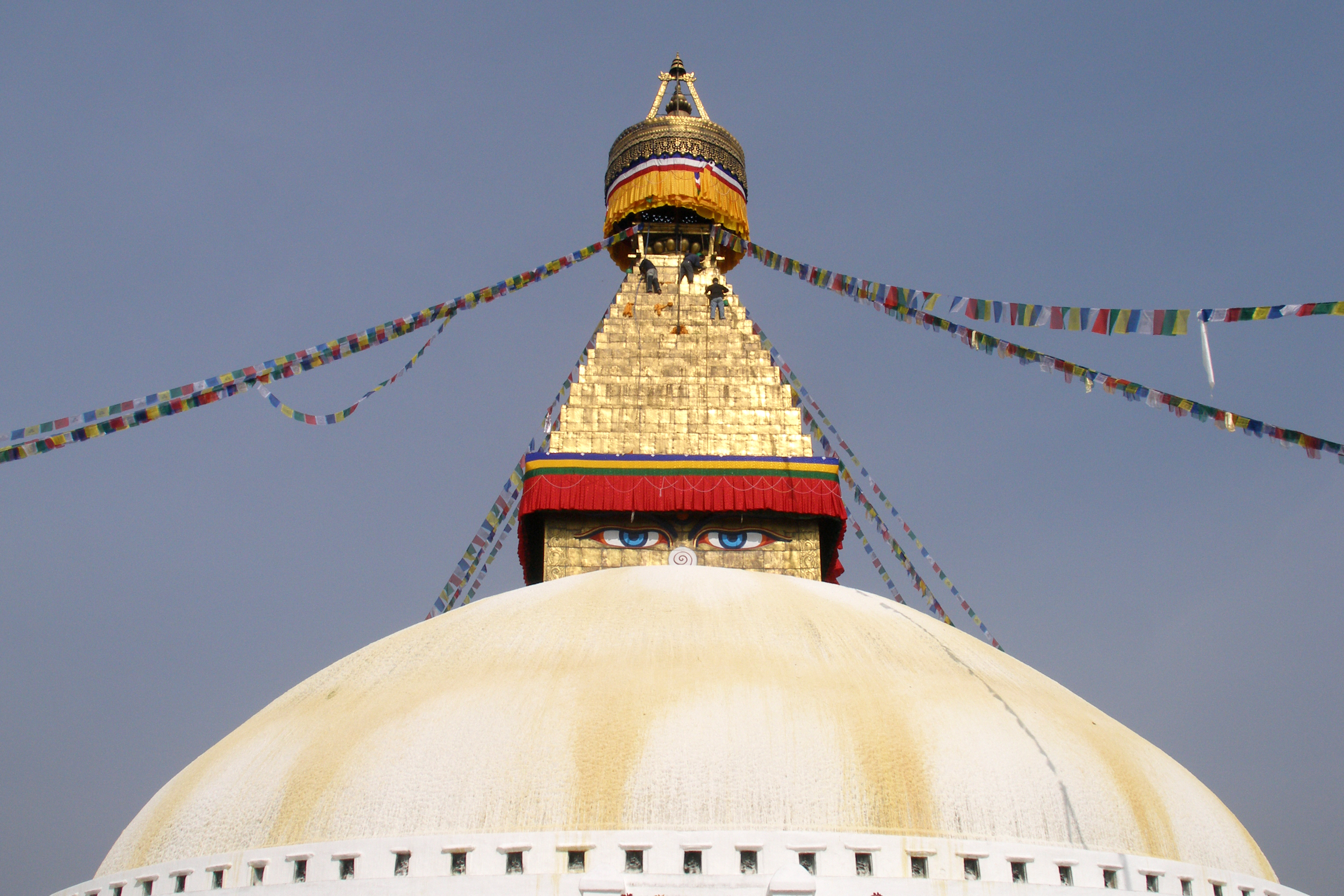
Boudha Stupa in Kathmandu

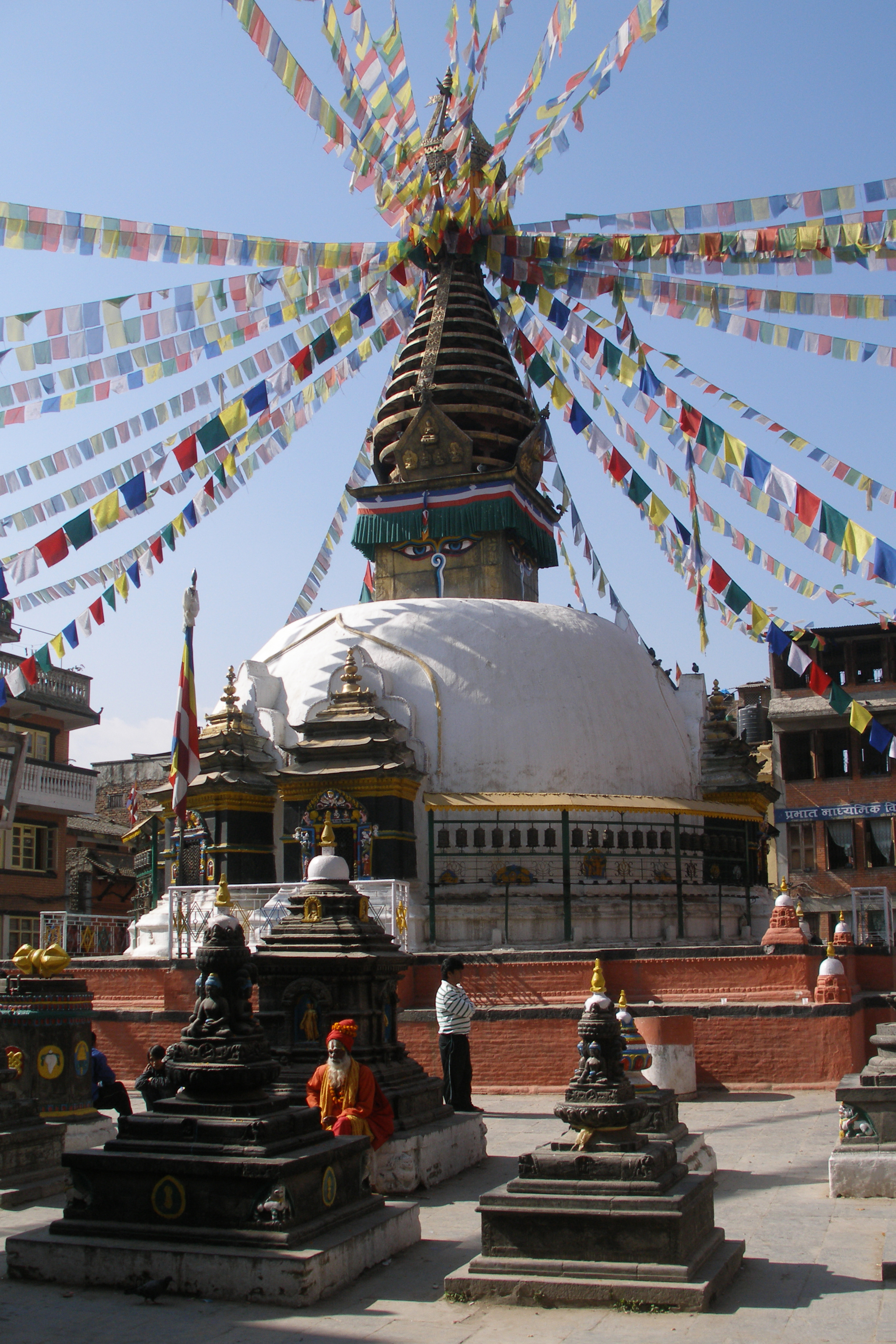
Kaathe Swyambhu in Kathmandu

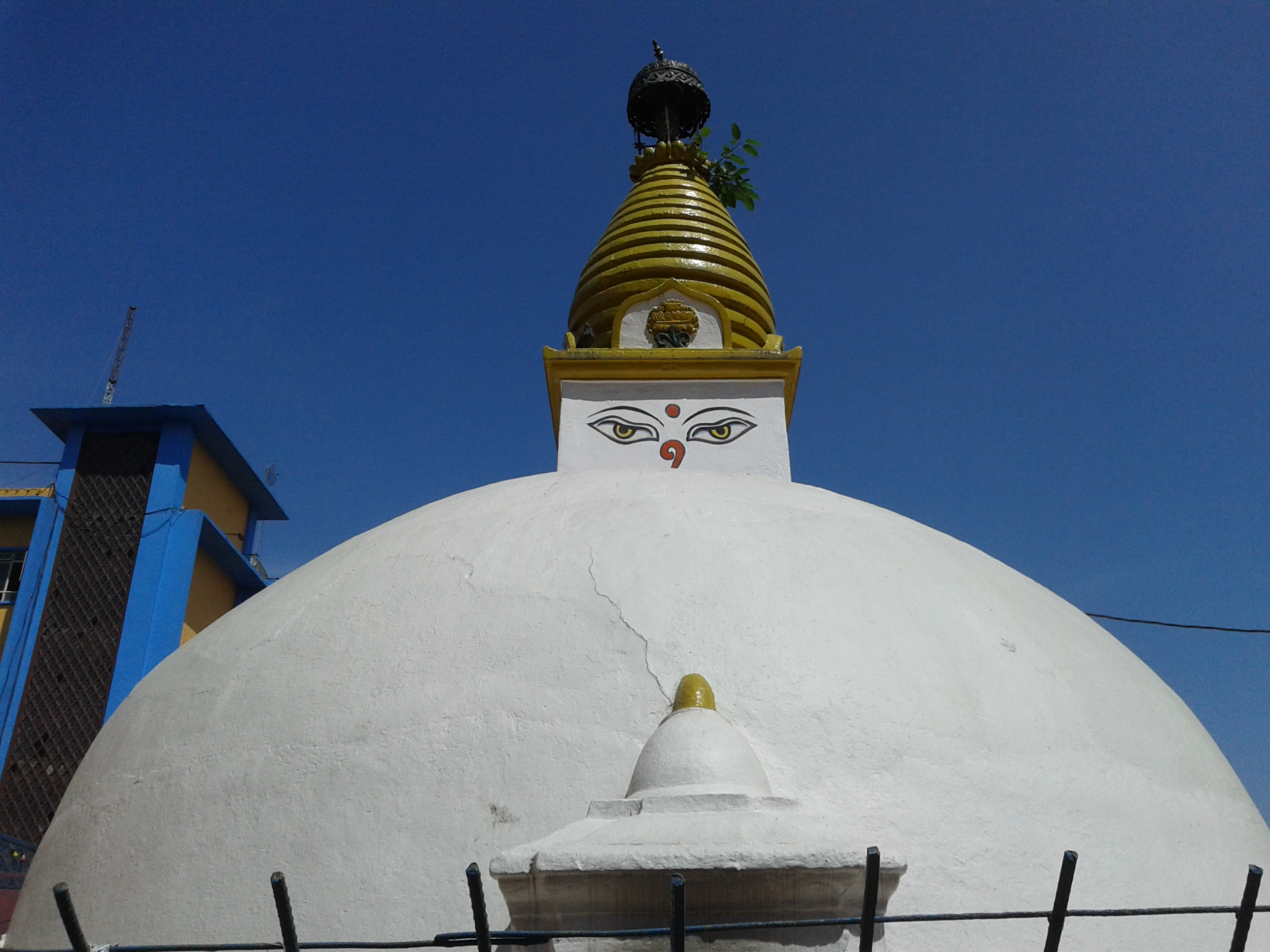
Mahabouddha Temple in Lalitpur

== See also ==
- Burmese pagoda – Buddhist stupas in Myanmar
- Candi – Hindu and Buddhist temples and sanctuaries in Indonesia
- Gorintō – Japanese funerary pagoda
- Hōkyōintō – Style of pagoda
- Ice stupa – Artificial glacier mound for storing water
- Kyaung – Buddhist monasteries in Myanmar
- Pagoda festival – Buddhist festivals and fiestas in Myanmar
- Peace Pagoda – Buddhist stupa; a monument to inspire peace
- Reliquary – Container for religious relics
- Sand pagoda – Buddhist stupas made of sand and erected temporarily
- Wat – Buddhist or Hindu temple in Asia
