= List of people from Haifa =

This is a list of famous people from the Israeli city of Haifa.

== Academia and research ==
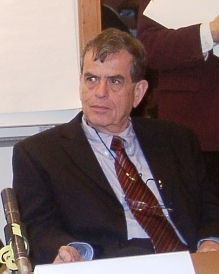
Aaron Ciechanover

- Rachel Adato (gynecologist)
- Dan Bar-On (psychologist)
- Nitza Ben-Dov (Literature)
- Edmond Bonan (mathematician)
- Aaron Ciechanover (biologist; 2004 Nobel Prize, Chemistry)
- David Deutsch (physicist)
- Dahlia Gredinger (chemist)
- Yehuda Hayuth (geography; President of the University of Haifa)
- Avram Hershko (biochemist, 2004 Nobel Prize, Chemistry)
- Amnon Pazy (1936–2006), mathematician; President of the Hebrew University of Jerusalem
- Ilan Pappé (historian)
- Nadera Shalhoub-Kevorkian (feminist legal scholar)

== Arts and entertainment ==
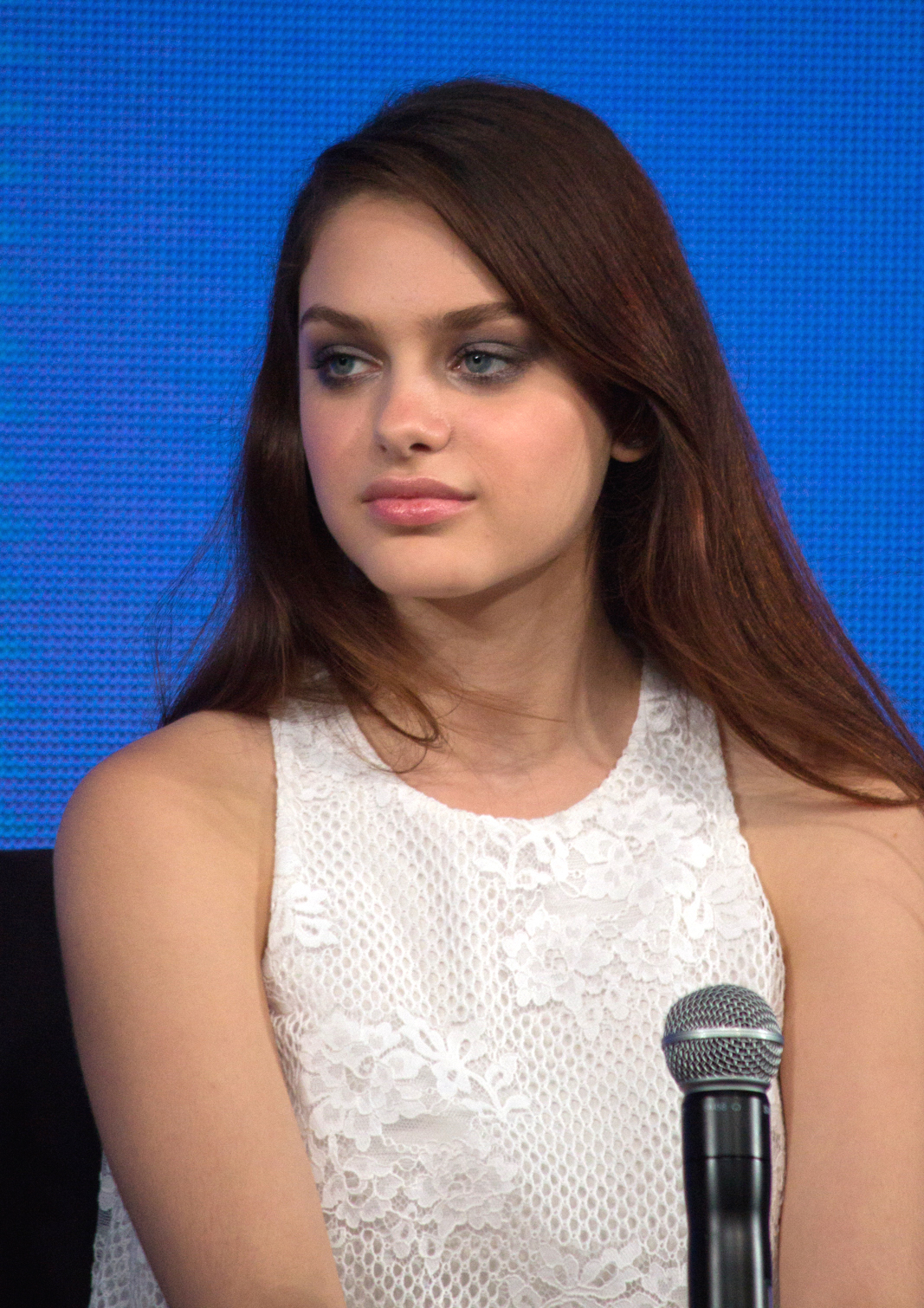
Odeya Rush

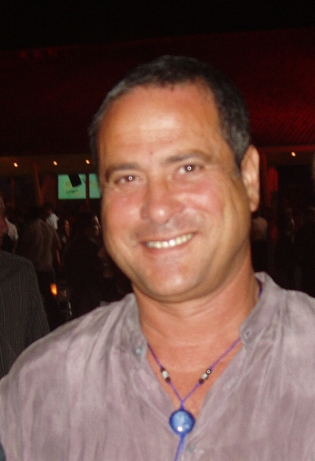
Dudu Topaz

- Abed Abdi (painter, sculptor)
- Chava Alberstein (singer)
- Moran Atias (model)
- Ralph Bakshi (animator and director)
- Mike Brant (pop star)
- David Broza (musician)
- Delilah (fictional character from John Rain series)
- Chana Eden (actress and singer)
- Ari Folman (film director)
- Amos Gitai (film director)
- Ivry Gitlis (violinist)
- Carine Goren (pastry chef, cookbook author, and television baking show host)
- Haya Harareet (actress and screenwriter)
- Infected Mushroom (electronic music duo)
- Dorit Jellinek (Miss Israel 1978)
- Tamara Musakhanova, sculptor and ceramist
- Daliah Lavi (actress and singer)
- Avi Lerner (movie executive)
- Talia Lewenthal (Miss Israel 1996)
- Dani Litani (musician and actor)
- Shiri Maimon (singer)
- Izidore Musallam (film director)
- Vince Offer (entertainer and pitchman)
- Eytan Pessen (voice teacher, pianist and opera director)
- Yehuda Poliker (singer)
- Nasreen Qadri (singer)
- Ronit Rinat (Miss Israel 1964)
- Ziva Rodann (actress)
- Odeya Rush (actress)
- Daniel Salomon (musician)
- Rinat Shaham (opera singer)
- Simon Shaheen (musician-Oud player)
- Gene Simmons (musician, bassist of Kiss)
- Shirin Sahba (painter, artist)
- Hillel Slovak (musician, original guitarist of the Red Hot Chili Peppers)
- Drew Tal (Dror Toledano, photographer and visual artist)
- David Tartakover (artist)
- Dudu Topaz (1946–2009) (TV and radio personality, comedian, and author)
- Keren Tzur (actress and director)
- Nilli Willis (adult film star)
- Miri Zamir (Miss Israel 1968)
- Noam Zylberman (actor)

== Education ==
- Dr. Arthur Biram (educator)

== Engineering and technology ==
- Moshe Safdie (architect)
- Johny Srouji (computer scientist)

== Fashion ==
- Lea Gottlieb (founder and fashion designer of Gottex)

== Journalism and media ==
- Yoseph Haddad (Arab Israeli journalist and activist)
- Rula Jebreal (Palestinian-Italian journalist)
- Ari Libsker (journalist)
- Tewfik Mishlawi (veteran Lebanese journalist)
- Amit Segal (journalist)

== Literature ==
- Emile Habibi (author)
- Sami Michael (author)
- Galila Ron-Feder Amit (author)
- Alex Aronson (author, teacher)

== Military and security ==
- Ze'ev Almog (11th Commander of the Israeli Sea Corps)
- Yohai Ben-Nun (6th Commander of the Israeli Sea Corps)
- Yaakov Dori (1st Chief of Staff of the Israel Defense Forces)
- Haim Laskov (5th Chief of Staff of the Israel Defense Forces and 4th Commander of the Israeli Air Force)
- Ehud Shani (general)
- Paul Shulman (2nd Commander of the Israeli Sea Corps)
- Shmuel Tankus (5th Commander of the Israeli Sea Corps, Palmach hero)
- Benjamin Telem (9th Commander of the Israeli Sea Corps)

== Medicine and Health Care ==
- Dina Feldman, Israeli Commissioner for Equal Rights of Persons with Disabilities
- Dr. Ora Golan, Founder of The Ora Golan Center for Functional Medicine

== Politics and government ==
- Rachel Adato (politician)
- Naftali Bennett (politician)
- Moshe Feiglin (politician)
- Noah Gal Gendler (ambassador)
- Emile Habibi (Christian Communist writer and politician)
- Zevulun Hammer (politician)
- Khaled al-Hassan (Palestinian politician)
- Hani al-Hassan (Palestinian politician)
- Moshe Kahlon (politician)
- Leila Khaled (Palestinian politician)
- Uzi Landau (politician)
- Uri Lupolianski (mayor of Jerusalem)
- Jabra Nicola (Palestinian Trotskyist leader)
- Boaz Rodkin (ambassador)
- Dan Tichon (politician)
- Emile Toma (politician)
- Moti Yogev (politician)

== Religion ==
- Yona Metzger
- Samir Habiby

== Sports ==
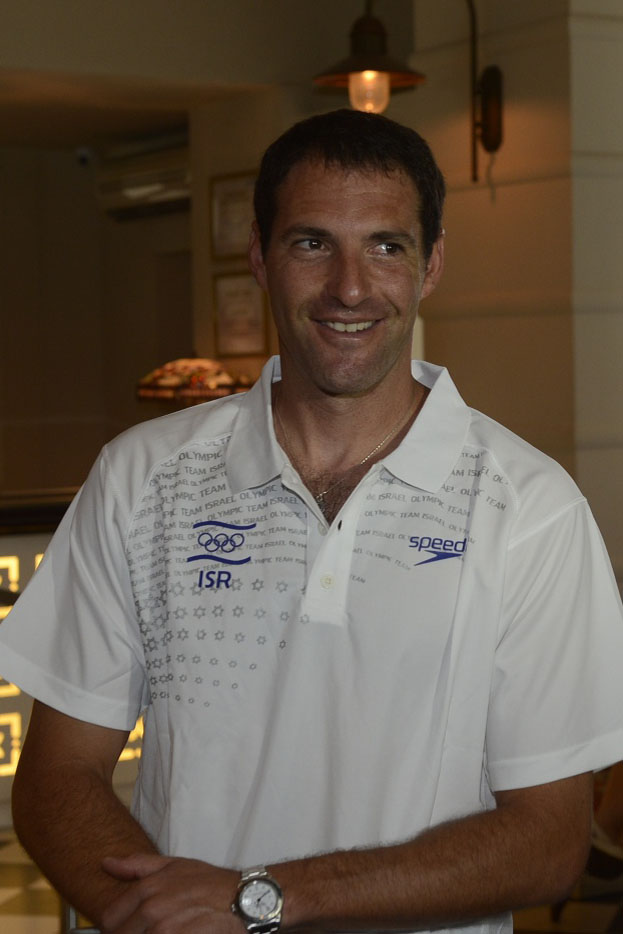
Jonathan Erlich

- Eduard Meron (born 1937), Olympic weightlifter
- Ayala Hetzroni (born 1938), Olympic shotputter
- Ruth Abeles (born 1942), Olympic gymnast
- Yochanan Vollach (born 1945), footballer, president of Maccabi Haifa
- Miron Bleiberg (born 1955), football coach
- Shem-Tov Sabag (born 1959), Olympic marathoner
- Nili Drori (born 1960), Olympic foil fencer
- Shahar Perkiss (born 1962), tennis player
- Ronny Rosenthal (born 1963), footballer
- Reuven Atar (born 1969), footballer
- Tal Banin (born 1971), footballer
- Arik Benado (born 1973), footballer
- Idan Tal (born 1975), footballer
- Lior Mor (born 1976), tennis player
- Eithan Urbach (born 1977), Olympic swimmer, backstroke
- Jonathan Erlich (born 1977), tennis player
- Ran Nakash (born 1978), cruiserweight boxer
- Noam Okun (born 1978), tennis player
- Tomer Or (born 1978), fencer
- Guy Parselany (born 1978), professional basketball player
- Yaniv Katan (born 1981), association football player
- Eyal Levin (born 1986), Olympic sports sailor
- Lior Refaelov (born 1986), footballer
- Ilana Kratysh (born 1990), freestyle wrestler
- Orr Barouch (born 1991), footballer
- Jonatan Kopelev (born 1991), swimmer
- Bar Timor (born 1992), basketball player
- Gil Cohen (born 1992), Olympic sports sailor
- Yiftach Ziv (born 1995), basketball player
- Nina Amir (born 1999), Olympic sports sailor
- Ami Omer Dadaon (born 2000), Paralympic champion and world champion swimmer
- Mark Malyar (born 2000), Paralympic champion and world champion para swimmer
- Ron Polonsky (born 2001), Olympic swimmer
- Lea Polonsky (born 2002), Olympic swimmer
- Anastasia Gorbenko (born 2003), Olympic swimmer
- Shani Bakanov (born 2006), world champion rhythmic gymnast

== Other ==
- Gilla Gerzon, Director, Haifa USO
- Amir Gal-Or, businessman
- Eival Gilady, CEO of the Portland Trust
- Sol Gradman, entrepreneur
- Hannah Safran, feminist, activist and researcher
- David Sambar, international investment banker, financial advisor and investor
- Eyal Weizman, intellectual and architect
