= Kunjar (surname) =

Kunjir are descent from one branch of the Seuna Yadavas of Devagiri, which is Maratha Kshatriya. In the 13th century, Seuna Yadavas of Devagiri's King Singhan II marched towards the near-eastern part of Pune, to protect his provenance from the attacks of North. He won as well as lost few wars. Some of his sardars decided stay behind. They settled near Baramati, Bhuleshwar, Shindavane, Dhawaleshwar & Kanifnath Temples, near the eastern part of Pune and ruled the winning area as Patil. Some of them were leading the war elephantry section of the army at that era. In Sanskrit, "elephant" is pronounced as a "Kunj" (कुंज), so this branch was known as "Koonjur" (कुंजर), which was later on inherited as "Kunjir" (कुंजीर). Kunjir's current residency is located in the Village Waghapur in Purandhar Taluka from Pune District. This surname is commonly found in the maratha kshatriya peoples.

Kunjir's original kingdom belongs to Mathura while in Dvapara Yuga changed to Dwarka. This surname is commonly found among Maratha Kshatriyas.

Kunjar / Kunjir's origin belongs to Mathura. Later, some of the Kunjir families moved to nearby state of Maharashtra like Gujarat and Madhya Pradesh. According to Dramashastra Gotra, Veda, Devak, Mantra and Kuldevi of Kunjir are Gotra:- Maharishi Atri. Veda:- Rugveda. Devak:- Audumbar tree, Mantra:- Panchakshara mantra. Kuldevi/Kuldevata:- Goddess Jogeshwari. Kunjir family has long enjoyed the privileges of sar-patil of 360 villages and towns in the Subha of Poona.

== Notable persons of the family ==
- Balaji Kunjar
- Pandoji Kunjar
- Sambhajirao Kunjir
