= Samba (disambiguation) =

Samba is a genre of music originating from Rio de Janeiro. Samba may also refer to:

== Dance ==
- Samba (Brazilian dance), a genre of Afro-Brazilian dance
- Samba (ballroom dance), a ballroom dance
- Samba de Gafieira, a Brazilian ballroom dance

== Music ==
- Samba rock, a subgenre of samba
- Samba!, a 1962 album by Edmundo Ros
- Samba (album), a 2005 album by Twins
- "Samba" (song), a 2011 song by Ricky Martin from the album Música + Alma + Sexo

== Places ==
- Samba, Luanda, Angola, a district of Luanda
- Samba Department, Burkina Faso
  - Samba, Burkina Faso, capital of the department
- Samba, Jammu and Kashmir, India, a town
- Samba district, Jammu and Kashmir, India
  - Samba railway station
- Samba, Iran, a village in South Khorasan Province

== People ==
- Samba (surname), a list of people
- Samba (given name), a list of people

== Films ==
- Samba (1965 film), a Brazilian-Spanish musical film
- Samba (1996 film), a Hungarian comedy film
- Samba (2004 film), a Telugu-language Indian film
- Samba (2014 film), a French comedy drama film

== Businesses and brands ==
- Adidas Samba, an athletic shoe for footballers
- Samba (bus), a name for one variation of the Volkswagen Type 2
- Talbot Samba, a car produced by PSA Group 1981–1986
- Cosmos Samba, ultralight trike aircraft
- Urban Air Samba, a Czech light aircraft
- Samba TV, a smart TV company
- Samba Financial Group, a banking firm in Saudi Arabia

== Science and technology ==
- Samba (software), cross-platform network file and printer sharing suite

== Other uses ==
- Samba (Krishna's son), a son of the Hindu god Krishna
- Samba (rice), a variety of rice grown in India and Sri Lanka
- Samba (card game), a variant of canasta
- 29 AD Regiment (Samba), an Air Defence regiment of the Indian Army
- Salinas Valley Samba, a National Premier Soccer League team based in Salinas, California
- Samba: The Making of Brazilian Carnival, a 1990 book by Alma Guillermoprieto
- Samba, a dialect of the Holu language, spoken in Angola and the Democratic Republic of Congo, or possibly a separate language

== See also ==
- Sambar (disambiguation)
- Shamba (disambiguation)
- Shambu (disambiguation)
- Sambha (Sholay), a fictional sidekick of the dacoit Gabbar Singh, played by Mac Mohan in the 1975 classic Indian film Sholay
