= Sambhaji (disambiguation) =

Sambhaji or Chhatrapati Sambhaji was the eldest son of Shivaji and the second ruler of the Maratha kingdom.

Sambhaji may also refer to:

- Chhatrapati Sambhaji Nagar, official name of Aurangabad, a city in Maharashtra, India
- Chhatrapati Sambhaji (1925 film), an Indian silent film about the ruler
- Chhatrapati Sambhaji (1934 film), an Indian film about ruler
- Chhatrapati Sambhaji (2024 film), an Indian film about the ruler

== People ==
- Sambhaji Bhide, Indian Hindu activist
- Sambhaji Raje (born 1971), Indian politician
- Sambhaji Patil Nilangekar (born 1978), Indian politician
- Sambhaji Kadam (born 1932), Indian painter
- Sambhaji II (1698–1760), king of Kolhâpur
- Sambhaji Shahaji Bhosale (1623–1655), brother of Shivaji
- Sambhaji III (1801–1821), Raja of Kolhapur
- Sambhajirao Kakade (1931–2021), Indian politician
- Sambhajirao Kunjir, Indian politician
- Sambhaji Angre (1920–2008), Indian politician

== Organizations ==
- Sambhaji Brigade, Maratha organisation in Maharashtra, India

== See also ==
- Shambu (disambiguation)
