= Shambhunath (disambiguation) =

Shambhunath is a town in Nepal.

Sambhunath or Shambhunath may also refer to:

- Another name of the Hindu deity Shiva
- Shambhunath Temple in Shambhunath, Nepal
- Sambhunath College in West Bengal, India
- Shambhunath Institute of Engineering and Technology in Uttar Pradesh, India
- Sambhunath (given name)

== See also ==
- Shambu (disambiguation)
- Nath (disambiguation)
