= Applications of agroforestry =

The principles of agroforestry have been applied in many countries, in different regions of the globe.

== Applications ==
=== Africa ===
A project to mitigate climate change with agriculture was launched in 2019 by the "Global EverGreening Alliance". The target is to sequester carbon from the atmosphere. By 2050 the restored land should sequestrate 20 billion tons of carbon annually.

Shamba (Swahili for 'plantation') is an agroforestry system practiced in East Africa, particularly in Kenya. Under this system, various crops are combined: bananas, beans, yams and corn, to which are added timber resources, beekeeping, medicinal herbs, mushrooms, forest fruits, fodder for livestock, etc.

=== Americas ===
The Amazon rainforest, rather than being a pristine wilderness, has been shaped by humans for at least 11,000 years through practices such as forest gardening and terra preta. Since the 1970s, numerous geoglyphs have been discovered on deforested land in the Amazon rainforest, furthering the evidence of pre-Columbian civilizations.

On the Yucatán Peninsula, much of the Maya food supply was grown in "orchard gardens", known as pet kot. The system takes its name from the low wall of stones (pet meaning 'circular' and kot, 'wall of loose stones') that characteristically surrounds the gardens.

The environmental historian William Cronon argued in his 1983 book Changes in the Land that indigenous North Americans used controlled burning to form ideal habitat for wild game. The natural environment of New England was sculpted into a mosaic of habitats. When indigenous Americans hunted, they were "harvesting a foodstuff which they had consciously been instrumental in creating". Most English settlers, however, assumed that the wealth of food provided by the forest was a result of natural forces, and that indigenous people lived off "the unplanted bounties of nature." Animal populations declined after settlement, while fields of strawberries and raspberries found by the earliest settlers became overgrown and disappeared for want of maintenance.

=== Burma ===
Taungya is a system from Burma. In the initial stages of an orchard or tree plantation, trees are small and widely spaced. The free space between the newly planted trees accommodates a seasonal crop, providing additional income. More complex taungyas use between-tree space for multiple crops. The crops become more shade tolerant as the tree canopies grow and the amount of sunlight reaching the ground declines. Thinning can maintain sunlight levels.

=== Hawaiʻi ===
Native Hawaiians formerly practiced agroforestry adapted to the islands' tropical landscape, using in particular breadfruit and coconut. Their ability to do this influenced the region's carrying capacity, social harmony, cooperation, and political complexity. More recently, after scientific study of lo'I systems, attempts have been made to reintroduce dryland agroforestry in Hawaiʻi Island and Maui, fostering interdisciplinary collaboration between political leaders, landowners, and scientists.

=== India ===
Itteri agroforestry systems have been used in Tamil Nadu since time immemorial. They involve the deliberate management of multipurpose trees and shrubs grown in intimate association with herbaceous species. They are often found along village and farm roads, small gullies, and field boundaries.

Bamboo-based agroforestry systems (Dendrocalamus strictus + sesame–chickpea) have been studied for enhancing productivity in semi-arid tropics of central India.

=== South-east Asia ===
In response to the ecological degradation caused by industrial oil palm monocultures, biodiversity islands are being implemented in Jambi and North Sumatra, Indonesia. These involve integrating native tree species and fruit trees such as Durian into existing plantations to restore ecosystem functions and soil health.

Similarly, in Sarawak and Sabah, Malaysia, agroforestry models are being developed for degraded peatlands primarily to mitigate chronic flooding caused by land subsidence in aging palm plantations. By rewetting drainage canals and cultivating flood-tolerant species, these systems aim to maintain agricultural productivity and prevent the total loss of arable land, with the reduction of carbon emissions serving as a significant environmental co-benefit.

=== Switzerland ===
Since the 1950s, four-fifths of Swiss Hochstammobstgärten (traditional orchards with tall trees) have disappeared. An agroforestry scheme was tested here with hochstamm trees together with annual crops. Trees tested were walnut (Juglans regia) and cherry (Prunus avium). Forty to seventy trees per hectare were recommended, yields were somewhat decreasing with increasing tree height and foliage. However, the total yield per area is shown to be up to 30 percent higher than for monocultural systems.

Another set of tests involve growing Populus tremula for biofuel at 52 trees a hectare and with grazing pasture alternated every two to three years with maize or sorghum, wheat, strawberries and fallowing between rows of modern short-pruned & grafted apple cultivars ('Boskoop' & 'Spartan') and growing modern sour cherry cultivars ('Morina', 'Coraline' and 'Achat') and apples, with bushes in the rows with tree (dogrose, Cornus mas, Hippophae rhamnoides) intercropped with various vegetables.
