= Sambar =

Sambar or Sambhar may refer to:

- Sambar deer, a species of deer
- Sambar (dish), a lentil-based dish common in India and Sri Lanka
- Sambar (film), an Indian Malayalam-language film by Navas Kallara
- Sambhar, Rajasthan, a city and a municipality in Rajasthan state of India
- Sambhar Salt Lake, a lake in Rajasthan
- Subaru Sambar, a kei-class van
- David Sambar, a British American Lebanese international investment banker

== See also ==
- Sambara (disambiguation)
- Samba (disambiguation)
- Sambal (disambiguation)
