= Shamba =

Shamba may refer to:

- Sergei Shamba (born 1951), Abkhazian politician
- Shamba, alternate name of Shonbeh, a city in Iran
- Samba (Krishna's son), son of the Hindu deities Krishna and Jambavati
- Shamba (agroforestry system)

== See also ==
- Samba (disambiguation)
- Shambu (disambiguation)
- Sambha (Sholay), a fictional sidekick of the dacoit Gabbar Singh, played by Mac Mohan in the 1975 classic Indian film Sholay
