= Baloji =

Baloji may refer to:

- Balójí, or Balochi language, a Northwestern Iranian language
- Baloji (rapper) (born 1978), Belgian rapper of Congolese origin
- Baloji Kunjar or Balaji Kunjar (17**–1816), Maratha Sardar and Minister of Affairs in service of Peshwa Baji Rao II
