= Beirut Memorial =

United States military memorial

Coordinates: 34°44′52″N 77°24′52″W

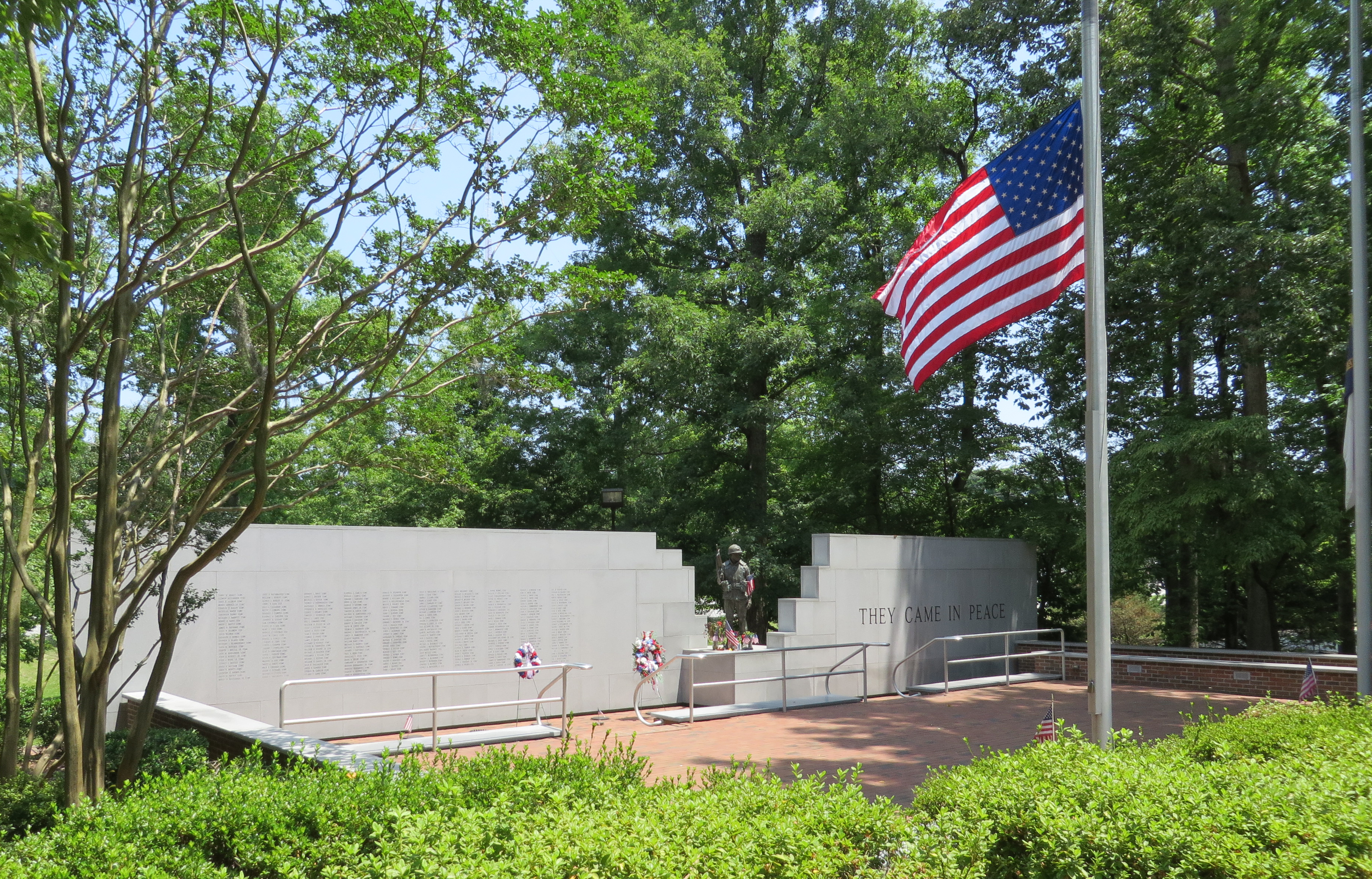
Beirut Memorial

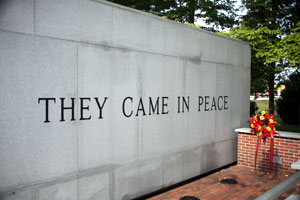
Beirut Memorial, Marine Corps Base Camp Lejuene

The Beirut Memorial is a memorial to the 241 American peacekeepers—220 Marines, 18 sailors, and three soldiers—killed in the October 23, 1983 Beirut barracks bombing in Beirut, Lebanon. It is located outside the gate of Camp Gilbert H. Johnson, a satellite camp of Marine Corps Base Camp Lejeune, in Jacksonville, North Carolina. It is the site of an annual commemoration of the victims of the suicide attack that took their lives.

== Beirut barracks bombing ==
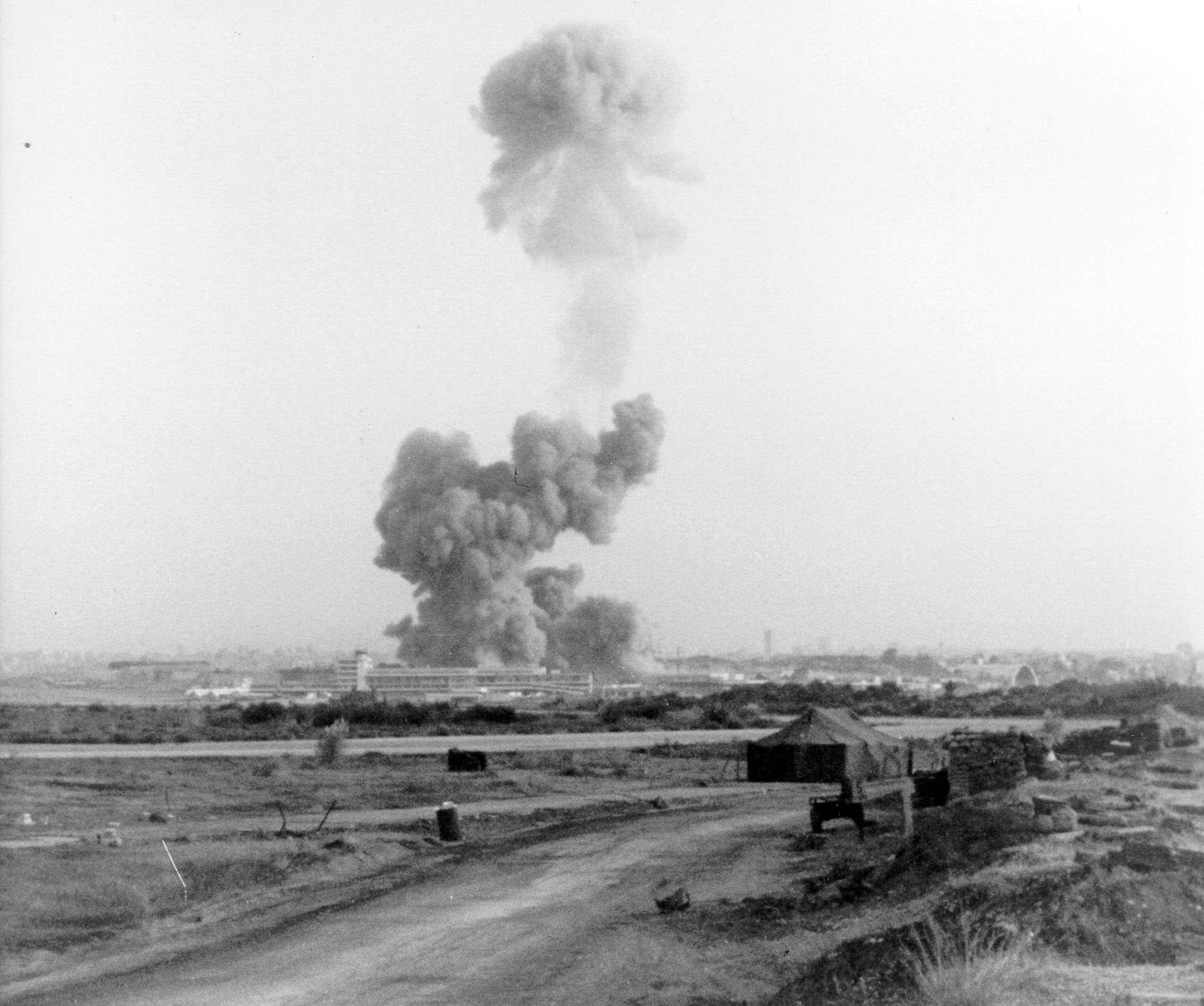
A smoke cloud rises from the rubble of the bombed barracks

The official webpage for Marine Corps Base Camp Lejeune describes the background for the attack memorialized by this monument as follows:

"In the summer of 1982, at the request of the Lebanese government, the United States agreed to establish a U.S. Military presence in that country to serve as a peacekeeping force in the conflict between warring Muslim and Christian factions. On March 24, 1983, the 24th Marine Amphibious Unit, stationed at Camp Lejeune, North Carolina, received orders to Beirut, Lebanon in support of that commitment.

Initially, the U.S. Forces, along with French and Italian Forces, provided a measure of stability; however, as diplomatic efforts failed to achieve a basis for a lasting settlement, the Muslim factions came to perceive the Marines as enemies. This led to artillery, mortar, and small arms fires being directed at the Marine Corps positions—with appropriate, measured response being taken against identified targets. In the early morning of October 23, 1983, the First Battalion, 8th Marines Headquarters building was destroyed by a non-Lebanese, terrorist-driven truck, laden with compressed gas-enhanced explosives. This truck, like many others, had become a familiar sight at the airport and so did not raise any alarm on this morning. The resulting explosion and the collapse of the building killed 241 Marines, Sailors, and Soldiers.

Later investigations would assign the blame for the attack on Hezbollah, with Imad Mughniyeh, who later died himself in a car bomb in Syria, as the "mastermind" behind the attack. In a court case involving survivors and family members of the victims of the bombing, a May 30, 2003, ruling by U.S. District Court Judge Royce C. Lamberth "found in favor of the survivors and the family members, ruling Iran responsible for the attack. The court finds that beyond question Hezbollah and its agents received massive material and technical support from the Iranian Government.”

Major Robert T. Jordan, USMC (Ret), one of the Marine officers present during the attack, has written that "The men who served with 24th MAU during the final, grim months of 1983, have taken their place alongside earlier Marines who endured at Samar, Wake Island, Chosin Reservoir, and Khe Sanh. The "Beirut Bombing," as the terrorist attack on 23 October 1983 has become known, is now a part of Marine Corps historical lore. But the event will serve to remind future generations of military planners and political policymakers to consider even the unthinkable when they conceive future commitments."

== Memorial history ==
Prior to the October 1983 attack, the City of Jacksonville Beautification and Appearance Commission had established a program to plant trees in the city as a "living memorial" to its citizens. Immediately after the Beirut barracks bombing, the Commission met to consider ways to memorialize the peacekeepers who died in the attack, ultimately requesting permission to plant additional trees on Lejeune Boulevard, the street linking the city to the Marine Corps Base. News spread about this plan, attracting donations on a national level, a response considered by the Commission as the "birth of the Beirut Memorial."

Later, as contributions continued to be made, Marine Corps Base Camp Lejeune "offered the Commission 4.5 acres of highly visible and publicly accessible land at the corner of Lejeune Boulevard and Montford Landing Road," enabling the Commission to begin work on a memorial, in addition to the trees.

== Memorial design ==
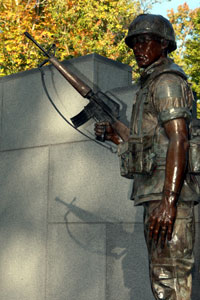
Statue at Beirut Memorial

Once Camp Lejeune had offered land for the erection of a memorial, the Commission launched a competition to create a design, inviting graduate students at the North Carolina State University's School of Design to offer ideas. Two students' designs were selected based on the positive attributes of their schemes and they subsequently collaborated on the final design and construction details. The proposed statue on the pedestal was originally conceived to be a seated soldier bowing his head in sadness, between the "rubble" of broken walls. At that time, no Marine memorial statuary had depicted a seated soldier figure. The Memorial was officially dedicated on October 23, 1986. The statue was added after the dedication, with a design expression in keeping with the Marine Corps' standards.

The design included a representation of two broken walls—reminiscent of the "crumbled walls" of the building demolished by the truck bomb attack—with a pedestal between them to support a statue. The bronze statue included in the memorial was later created by Abbé Godwin, the same artist who had created North Carolina's Vietnam Memorial in Raleigh, North Carolina, and was dedicated on October 22, 1988. A full-size replica was created for the National Fleet Reserve Associated Headquarters, in Alexandria, Virginia, and miniature replicas were created for the Marine Corps Scholarship Foundation, to help fund scholarships for military dependents.

Beirut families later requested that the poem "The Other Wall," written by Robert A. Gannon, be added to the memorial, and a special dedication ceremony was held in 1991 to recognize the poem's addition, with its words cast in bronze as a permanent part of the Memorial.

The Memorial bears the inscription "THEY CAME IN PEACE," along with 273 names: the names of those who died in the attack, the names of those who later died as a result of the injuries they sustained in the explosion, as well as the names of three Marine Corps pilots from the Jacksonville, North Carolina, area who were killed in the 1983 rescue operation in the island of Grenada. The words, "They came in peace," were chosen because they were used by the survivors of the attack on a makeshift memorial erected after the rescue efforts in Beirut: a memorial that consisted of a stretcher, a wreath, and a sign with the words, "24 MAU: They Came in Peace."

== Memorial ceremonies ==
Annual ceremonies are held at the Beirut Memorial on or near the date of the attack. At the 25th anniversary ceremony, on October 23, 2011, a plaque in honor of the Gold Star Mothers, mothers who have lost a child serving in the military, was dedicated as an addition to the memorial.

Additional ceremonies are sometimes held to remember the victims of the Beirut barracks bombing at other memorials, such as the wreath laying ceremony held at the Marine Corps Memorial in Florida's Veterans Memorial Park on the 20th anniversary of the attack, and the annual Beirut Remembrance Day ceremony that has been held since 2008 at the Vietnam Memorial in Phoenix, Arizona.

== Other memorials ==
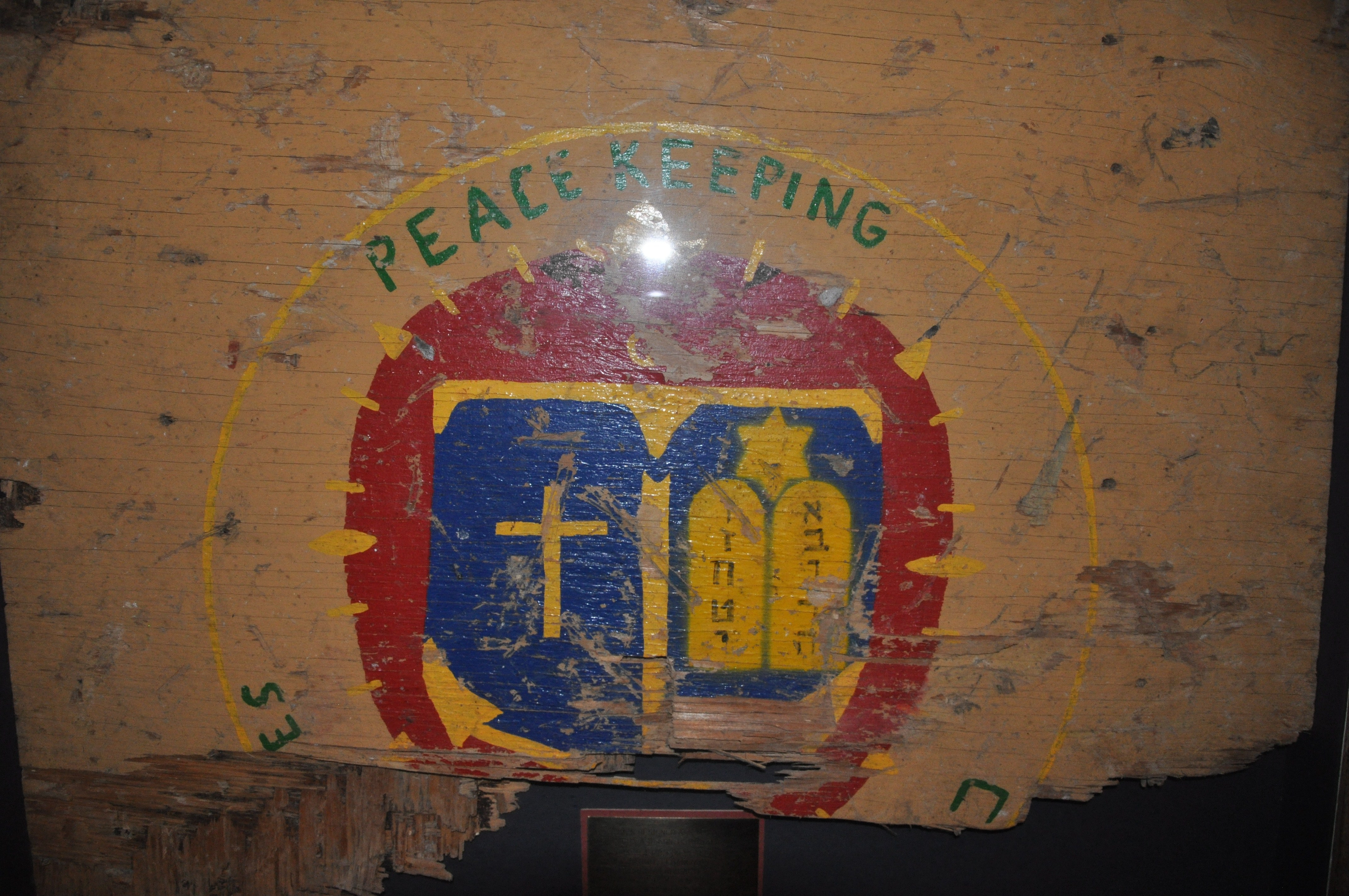
Partially destroyed sign from the Beirut barracks chapel, on display at the U.S. Armed Forces Chaplaincy Center in remembrance of the victims of the attack

There is a Beirut Memorial Room in the USO in Jacksonville, North Carolina, that includes a wall with the names of all those who died in the attack, along with the words "They Came in Peace." The Armed Forces Chaplaincy Center, the site of Chaplain Corps training for the U.S. Army, Navy, and Air Force at Fort Jackson, in Columbia, South Carolina, includes the partially destroyed sign from the Beirut barracks chapel as a memorial to those who died in the attack. According to Rabbi Arnold Resnicoff, one of the Navy chaplains present during the attack, "Amidst the rubble, we found the plywood board which we had made for our "Peace-keeping Chapel." The Chaplain Corps Seal had been hand-painted, with the words "Peace-keeping" above it, and "Chapel" beneath. Now "Peace-keeping" was legible, but the bottom of the plaque was destroyed, with only a few burned and splintered pieces of wood remaining. The idea of peace—above; the reality of war—below."

Other memorials to the victims of the Beirut barracks bombing have been erected in the United States, including those at Penn's Landing in Philadelphia, Pennsylvania, and Florida. Additionally, a Lebanese cedar has been planted in Arlington National Cemetery near the graves of some of the victims of the attack, in their memory. A plaque in the ground in front of the tree, dedicated in a ceremony on the first anniversary of the attack, reads: "Let peace take root: This cedar of Lebanon tree grows in living memory of the Americans killed in the Beirut terrorist attack and all victims of terrorism around the world." The National Museum of the Marine Corps, in Quantico, Virginia, unveiled an exhibit in 2008 in memory of the attack and its victims.

One memorial to the attack is located outside the U.S., where Gilla Gerzon, the director of the Haifa, Israel USO coordinated the creation of a memorial park that included 241 olive trees, one for each of the U.S. military personnel who died in the attack. The trees lead to an overpass on Mount Carmel looking toward Beirut.

== Memorial postage stamp ==
There is an ongoing effort to convince the United States Postal Service and Citizens' Stamp Advisory Committee to create a stamp in memory of the victims of the attack, but the recommendation has not yet been approved. In the meantime, Beirut veterans have created a "PC Postage" commercially produced Beirut Memorial statue private vendor stamp that is approved for use as postage by the U.S. Postal Service. In addition to their creation in memory of the attack and its victims, the sale of these stamps is also being used as a fundraiser for the Gold Star Mothers Memorial Foundation.

== See also ==
- Tyre headquarters bombings, similar attacks against Israeli military posts in Lebanon
- 1983 United States embassy bombing
- 1984 United States embassy annex bombing
