= Sambara (disambiguation) =

Sambara is a figure in Buddhist and Hindu mythology.

Sambara may also refer to:

- Sambara, Vizianagaram, a village in Andhra Pradesh, India
- The Shambaa people of northeastern Tanzania
- Sambara (moth), a genus of moths

== See also ==
- Sambar (disambiguation)
