= Sambal (disambiguation) =

Sambal is an Indonesian hot sauce. This may also refer to:

- Sambar (dish), Indian dish
- Sambal people, Philippine ethnolinguistic group
- Sambalic languages, languages of the Sambal people
- Sambal (drum), Indian percussion instrument
- a common name for Citrus × amblycarpa

== See also ==
- Sambar
