= Sambu =

Sambu may refer to:

- Sambu Kingdom, ancient kingdom in Angola
- Sambu, Estonia, village in Jõelähtme Parish, Harju County, Estonia
- Sambu Island, island in Riau Islands Province, Indonesia
- Sambú, Panama
- Sambavar, a caste in India
- Justin Sambu (born 1999), Canadian football player

== See also ==
- Shambu (disambiguation)
- Batara Sambu, a god in Indonesian Hinduism
- Sanbu, Chiba, town in Sanbu District, Chiba, Japan
- Sambuvaraya, an ancient kingdom of south India
