= Samba (surname) =

Samba is a surname. Notable people with the surname include:

- Abderrahman Samba (born 1995), Qatari hurdler
- Anton Samba (born 1982), Indonesian footballer
- Bindi Hindowa Samba, Sierra Leonean paramount chief
- Brice Samba (born 1994), Congolese footballer
- Chéri Samba (born 1956), Congolese painter
- Cherno Samba (born 1985), Gambian-British footballer
- Christian Samba (born 1971), Congolese former football goalkeeper
- Christopher Samba (born 1984), French footballer
- Fatou Samba (born 1995), known mononymously as Fatou, Senegalese-Belgian rapper, singer-songwriter, and model based in South Korea, leader of the girl group Blackswan
- Floyd Samba (born 2009), English footballer
- Issa Samba (born 1998), French footballer
- Léopold Ismael Samba (1946–2022), Central African civil servant and diplomat
- Lionel Samba (born 1999), French footballer
- Martin-Paul Samba (1875–1914), Cameroonian collaborator with and later rebel against German rule
- Miatta Maria Samba (born 1971), Sierra Leonian jurist and judge of the International Criminal Court in The Hague
- Moussa Samba (born 1988), Mauritanian footballer
- Ousmane Samba (born 1988), Mauritanian footballer
- Simon Samba (1929–?), Central African politician
- Tresor Samba (born 2002), Swiss footballer
- Tyrone Samba (born 2007), English footballer
