= Shambu (disambiguation) =

Shambu is a town in Ethiopia.

Shambu or Shambhu may also refer to:

- Term for happiness or auspiciousness in Sanskrit
  - Shiva, a major Hindu deity, also known as Shambhu
  - Brahma and Vishnu, also sometimes known as Shambhu
- Shambu (2005 film), an Indian Kannada-language film
- Shambu (2008 film), an Indian Malayalam-language film

== See also ==
- Sambu (disambiguation)
- Shambhunath (disambiguation)
- Shambhala (disambiguation), derives from Sanskrit Shambhu
- Sambhaji (disambiguation)
- Samba (disambiguation)
- Shamba (disambiguation)
- Shambu Dada, fictional character portrayed by Danny Denzongpa in the 1986 Indian film Bhagwan Dada
- Sambha (Sholay), a fictional sidekick of the dacoit Gabbar Singh, played by Mac Mohan in the 1975 classic Indian film Sholay
- Shamu (died 1971), a captive female orca
