= Gilla Gerzon =

USO leader

- גילה גרזון
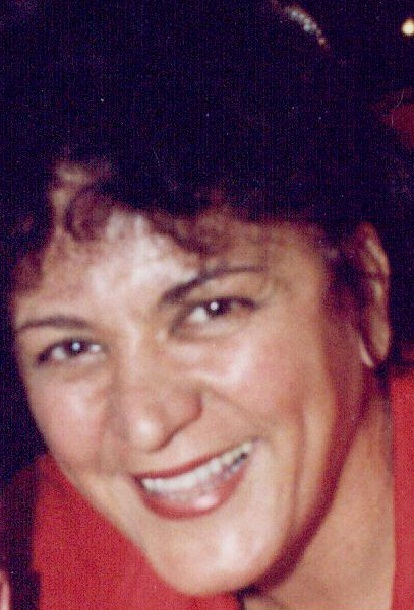
- Gilla Gerzon
- Citizenship: Israeli
- Occupation: USO Director

Gilla Gerzon (Hebrew: גילה גרזון), known to many United States military personnel as the "mother of the 6th fleet," is an Israeli who served as director of the Haifa, Israel USO for almost eighteen years, from the time it opened in December 1984 until it closed in September 2002 when U.S. security concerns for the region led to a sharp decrease in U.S. ship visits. In 1993, she was brought to Somalia to establish a temporary USO for U.S. service personnel deployed in support of Operation Restore Hope.

Gerzon is the first Israeli citizen to receive the United States Navy Commendation Medal.

== Background ==
Gerzon first began working with U.S. military personnel during her time as director of public relations at Haifa's Dan Carmel Hotel in the 1980s. She worked with the hotel to host holiday parties for officers and sailors from visiting U.S. ships, and then tours of Israel. She saw her actions as an "ideal way to repay the American people for all the warmth and comfort she and her daughter had received while in the United States."

== Haifa USO ==
The recommendation to open a USO in Israel was made by U.S. Navy Vice-Admiral Edward Martin, Commander, U.S. Sixth Fleet, when U.S. ship visits to Israel began to increase after the 1983 Beirut barracks bombings in Lebanon. Beginning in 1979 five to ten Sixth Fleet ships began to visit Haifa each year, but by the mid-80s, after the bombing, the annual number of port calls by U.S. ships had grown to 40–50. Two officers on Admiral Martin's staff, Public Affairs Officer Captain Peter Litrenta and Assistant Sixth Fleet Chaplain Rabbi Arnold Resnicoff, had worked with Gerzon during her time at the Dan Carmel, and recommended her as director for the proposed USO operation.

The new Haifa USO opened on December 2, 1984, before a crowd of hundreds of Navy personnel from the USS Dwight D. Eisenhower (CVN-69) and the USS Mississippi (CGN-40). It was located near the entrance to the Dan Panorama Hotel on Mount Carmel. Working with a team of volunteers, Gerzon worked to welcome military personnel and provide them with opportunities to explore and get to know Israel. Under her leadership, the Haifa USO became "one of the best-loved facilities in the USO system." Referred to as "a one-woman whirlwind" and "inexhaustibly hospitable," Gerzon's "take-charge approach won her renown among the officers and enlisted men of the 6th fleet," and made the USO "not a sad hangout for lonely sailors, but more like the busy office of a camp's activities director."

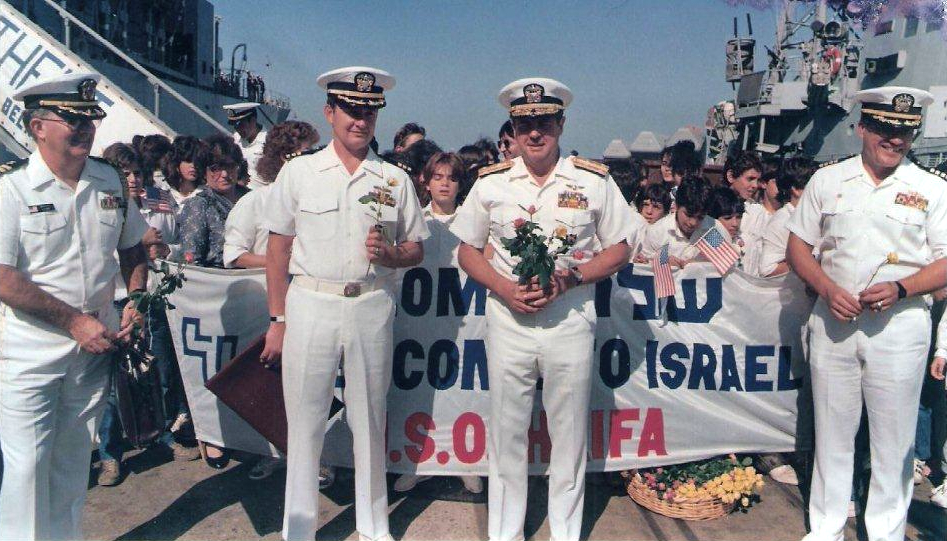
USO welcomes officers and crews of two U.S. Navy ships visiting Haifa

A USO article noted that the Haifa USO under Gerzon's leadership epitomized "forward deployed hospitality for U.S. forces overseas." Open 24 hours a day when U.S. ships visit Israel, her USO operation served as "an unofficial base of operations to American sailors and Marines forward-deployed to the Mediterranean." Gerzon was able to augment her small staff with 200 English-speaking volunteers so that the USO could function as a "bridge between visiting U.S. service personnel and the Israeli people," answering questions, arranging visits, making hotel and tour reservations, and sponsoring a program for local residents to "Adopt a Sailor" during U.S. Navy ship visits. Buses for "liberty parties" from the ships took officers and sailors from the port to the USO door.

=== Activities ===
Under Gerzon's direction, the USO not only provided opportunities for visiting military personnel to tour the country, but also to get involved with its people. For example, Gerzon speaks about the time a group of sailors visited a school for emotionally handicapped children, "just to play with them...to make tricks and entertain them...[and]they went back three times," while others went to schools to speak with students or to a cancer ward at a Haifa hospital to visit patients, entertaining them or bringing them gifts. Sailors would also help with special projects, such as painting orphanages or even homes for the elderly. Gerzon notes that during major ship visits, 400–500 sailors would visit the USO daily, sometimes asking questions about agriculture or technology in Israel, and sometimes to take advantage of free tickets to events such as the Haifa Symphony Orchestra. Trips organized by the USO brought sailors to locations including the Sea of Galilee, Bethlehem, Jerusalem, the Golan Heights, and Masada, in addition to visits to homes and kibbutzim.

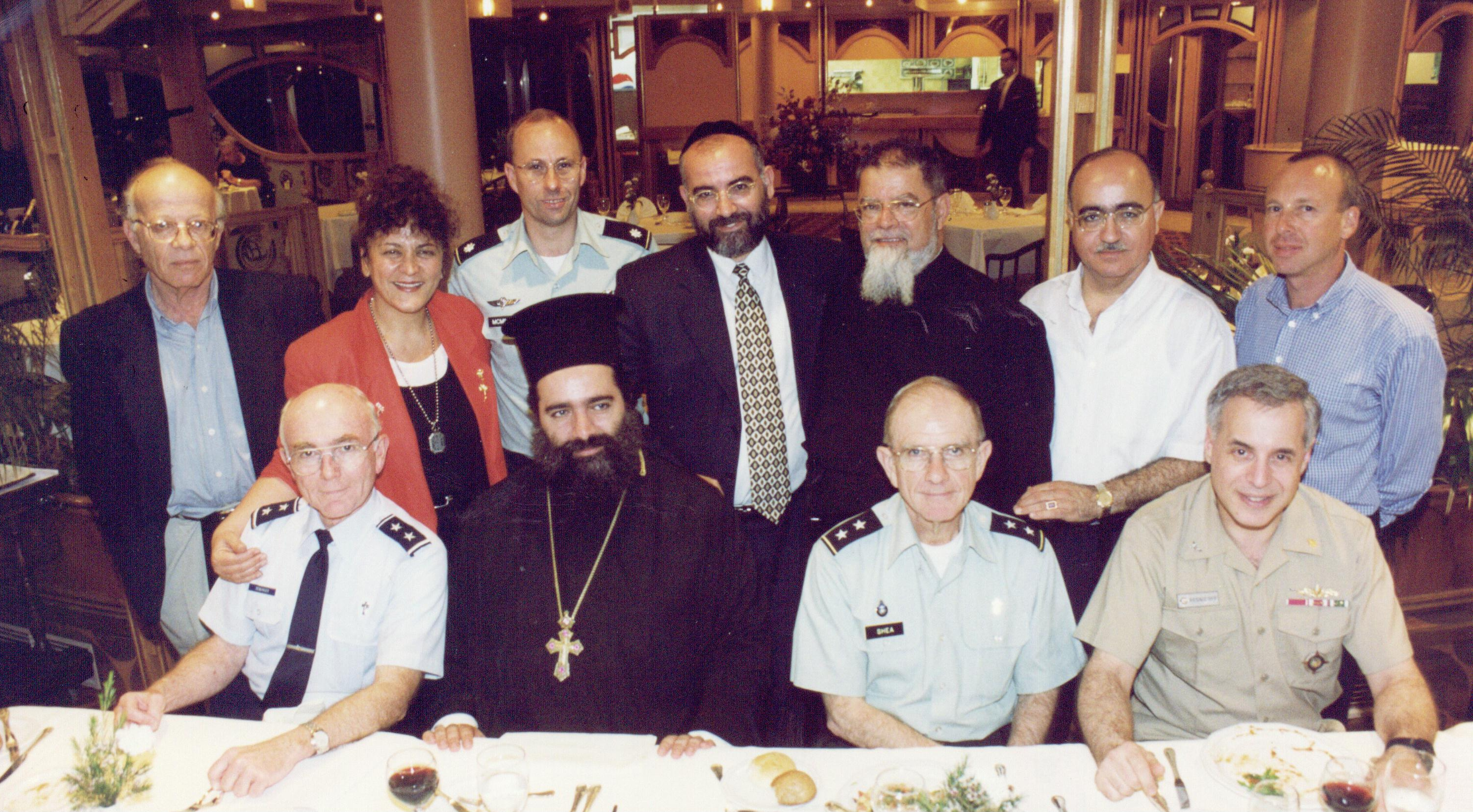
Gerzon with a gathering of religious leaders from Jerusalem, meeting with visiting U.S. Air Force and U.S. Army Chiefs of Chaplains and U.S. Sixth Fleet Navy Chaplain

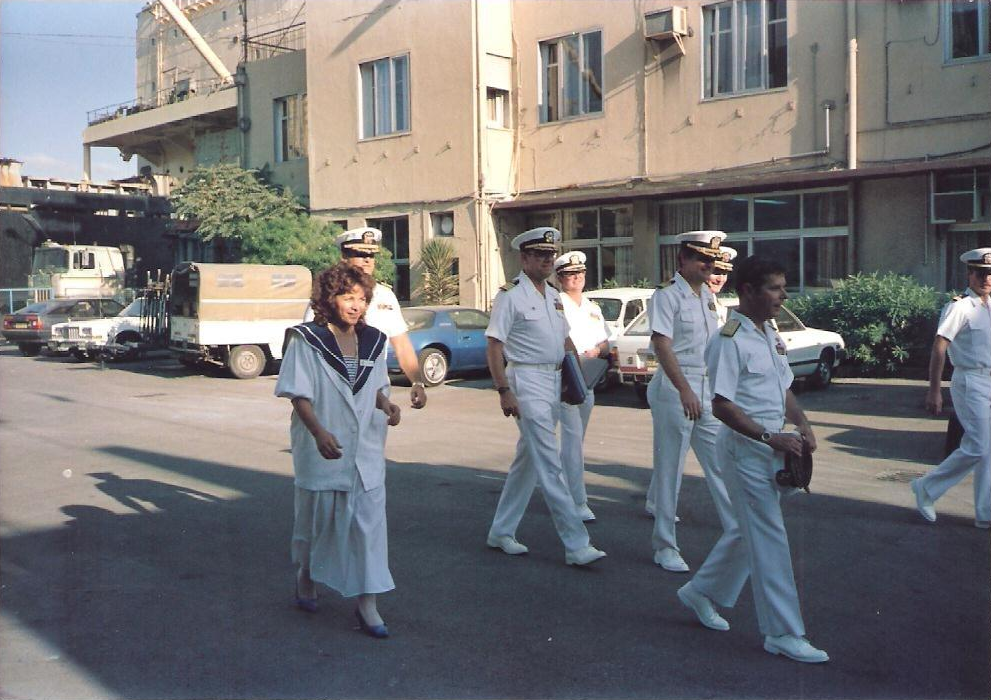
Gerzon escorting U.S. Navy officers on a visit to Haifa, led by Chief of Naval Operations Jeremy Michael Boorda (to right, holding hat)

In addition to activities that brought U.S. military personnel to meet Israelis, Gerzon worked to bring Israelis to meet and greet the Americans—such as the time that crew members from visiting U.S. Navy ships USS Dwight D. Eisenhower (CVN-69) and USS Mississippi (CGN-40) arrived on small boats from their ships to be greeted at the Haifa port by 50 Israeli school children, singing songs in Hebrew and English, and waving U.S. and Israeli flags. She also coordinated numerous home hospitality visits for arriving sailors—including one time, when a ship arrived on the eve of the Jewish holy day Rosh Hashana and it was hard to make last-minute contact with others, she called home to tell her mother to expect 100 additional guests for dinner. Gerzon recalls that her mother's immediate response was that she'll start making more soup. On another occasion, Gerzon coordinated volunteers from Haifa and Netanya to prepare 1400 home-cooked meals ("right down to the chicken soup") for crew members of the USS Iwo Jima and the USS El Paso. The USO also sponsored many special events including beach parties that allowed military personnel to mingle with Israeli citizens. Other special events for shipboard personnel Gerzon coordinated on behalf of the USO included children's parades, folklore dances, and even fashion shows.

=== Visits ===
In addition to creating a welcoming space and opportunities to explore Israel for the military personnel, especially those on visiting U.S. Navy ships, Gerzon worked as the USO Liaison to the U.S. Embassy in Tel Aviv to coordinate visits from many visiting military and civilian distinguished guests.

=== Closing ===
In 1989 USO financial concerns drove a decision to close the Haifa USO, but a groundswell of support and appeals from the Sixth Fleet, the United States Congress and organizations such as the Jewish Institute for National Security Affairs resulted in a reversal of the decision. Part of the decision was to use the USO to house a new "LT Elmo Zumwalt III" Library, sponsored by Book Bank USA. Soon thereafter, beginning in 1990, U.S. interest in Haifa increased, not only as a port of call, but even as a possible home port for some Navy ships, including one aircraft carrier. In fact, Israeli Prime Minister Yitzhak Rabin reportedly proposed to U.S. President Bill Clinton in 1993 that Haifa become the homeport for the U.S. Sixth Fleet, and a number of formal U.S. studies of Haifa port capabilities, including one by the Center for Naval Analyses, were completed.

However, when U.S. ship visits to Haifa sharply decreased in the early 2000s, largely because of security concerns in the region, including the Second Intifada in Israel and the October 2000 USS Cole bombing in Yemen, the USO was closed in September 2002. Israel criticized the U.S. decision as one that sent a signal of weakness to Islamic militants. Beginning in 2008 U.S. Navy ship visits to Haifa began to increase once more, but although no plans have been announced to reopen the USO, Haifa Deputy Spokesman Roni Grossman has said that hosting American sailors "is a great tradition of the city"—and although the number of sailors now visiting the city "pales in comparison" to the numbers that used to arrive on Navy ships, "it's significant that there is a renewed connection between Israel and the American navy...[and] Now we're doing everything we can to show the sailors a good time." Additionally, following the traditions established by the Haifa USO, visiting sailors are again engaging in volunteer projects during their visits. Many individuals and organizations involved with supporting visitors, on ships or through visits sponsored by the American Embassy, credit their work with Gerzon and the USO as the inspiration for their involvement.

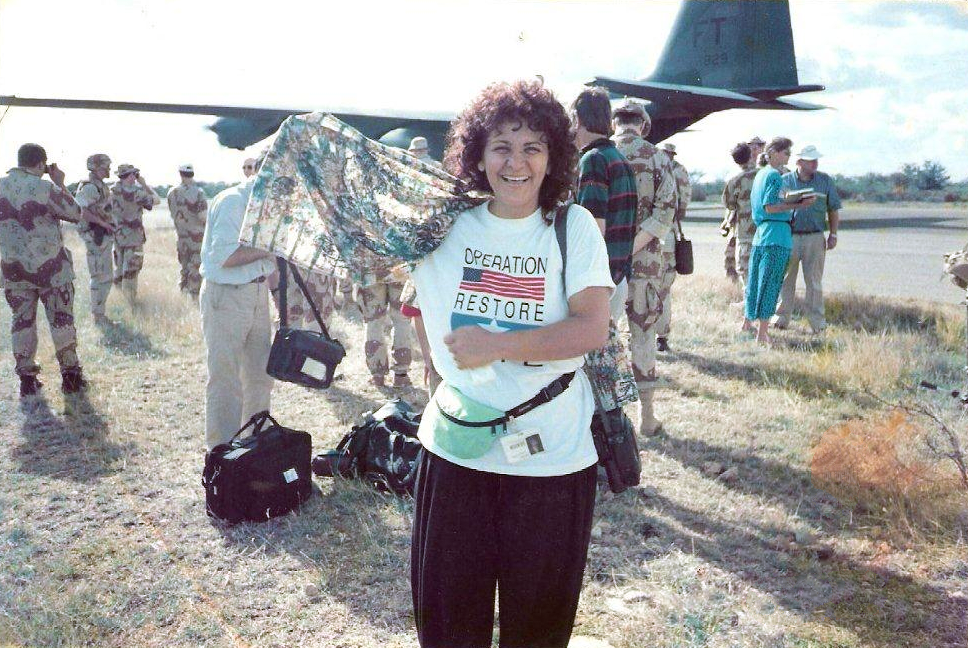
Gerzon arrives in Somalia December 1992 to establish USO Somalia

== USO Somalia ==
Gerzon was one of the first USO employees to volunteer to go to Somalia to work with the USO to support American troops. Gerzon traveled to Somalia in 1992 to lay the groundwork and gather volunteers for the official December 23, 1992 opening of "USO Somalia." Located at the Mogadishu airport, the USO Somalia operation continued through April 1993, hosting shows from entertainers such as Clint Black, but military personnel reported that something as simple as a "warm coke" ("best coke I ever had") made a big difference in their lives during hard times.

== Memorializing Americans ==
In honor of the 241 Americans killed in the 1983 Beirut barracks bombing Gerzon personally spearheaded an effort to have a park dedicated in their honor—with one tree planted for each victim of the attack. Recalling that she was "heartsick when I heard that so many young men had been killed," Gerzon immediately began to create support for a monument in honor of the victims, but the project was delayed after the kidnapping and eventual murder of U.S. Marine Lt.Col. William R. Higgins. Her efforts were successful when on February 12, 1992, the memorial was created, with 241 olive trees lining a "path of peace," dedicated at a point overlooking Lebanon itself, A "Higgins Tree" is planted at the end of the path. at the Mount Carmel National Park.

The tree planting ceremony that officially dedicated the site was attended by more than 250 Marines and Sailors from the U.S.Marine Corps 24th Marine Expeditionary Unit (MEU), and Israeli children from the Degania and Really schools in Haifa. Representing the 24th MEU, Sergeant Major W.E. Hatcher noted that 241 trees were being planted in memory of the 241 American lives lost in the Beirut attack, but that "we also dream that as these trees grow, they will grow with generations of mankind whose hopes of a future filled with peace and freedom will be realized." Following the initial tree planting, other groups of Sailors and Marines visited the sites, sometimes creating additional ceremonies to mark their visits and remember lost comrades. For example, on April 11, 1994, U.S. Marine Corps Brigadier General J. L. Jones was the speaker at a memorial service attended by members of the 24th MEU.

Gerzon continued to make this memorial a place to remember American losses, and after the December 1990 death of 21 U.S. sailors who drowned when their liberty boat capsized during its return to the USS Saratoga, she began efforts to remember their deaths as well—and within a year 21 additional trees were planted in their memory and a plaque memorializing them was added to the park. Gerzon continued to host ship visits to the memorial site, including visits for ship's crews to clean up the area and polish the plaques. Additionally, visits include an opportunity to read the names of those who have died because, according to Gerzon, "In Jewish tradition, if you read the names of the dead out loud, they never die." Gerzon has stated that the USO's goal is not to move mountains, but instead, "to move a few people's hearts," and she believes that efforts such as this one help that occur.

== Poetry ==
Gerzon's poetry often marked her efforts, including the poem she wrote to remember the Americans lost in the Beirut bombing: "They came in peace." Gerzon explained that "These men came in peace, to keep the peace...and that's why I felt they should be remembered."

At the April 1994 service held at the memorial for the victims, a new poem by Gerzon was read and included in the program, ending with the hope that "the children, who are the sign of hope, will walk in the path of peace Winter, Spring, Summer, and Fall, and God's nature will hold their memories."

The poem she wrote during her time with the USO in Somalia, "Rise up, children of Somalia," was the inspiration for the song of the same name sung by the Somali singer Malika and the Mombasa Roots Band.

== Honors and awards ==
For her work during Operation Desert Storm, the U.S. Secretary of the Navy authorized the award of the Navy Commendation Medal (since renamed the "Navy and Marine Corps Commendation Medal") to Gerzon. The medal was presented in a ceremony on board the USS Inchon, making Gerzon the first Israeli citizen to receive that award.

== See also ==
- Beirut Memorial
- List of people from Haifa
- Port of Haifa
