= Alma Guillermoprieto =

Mexican-American journalist

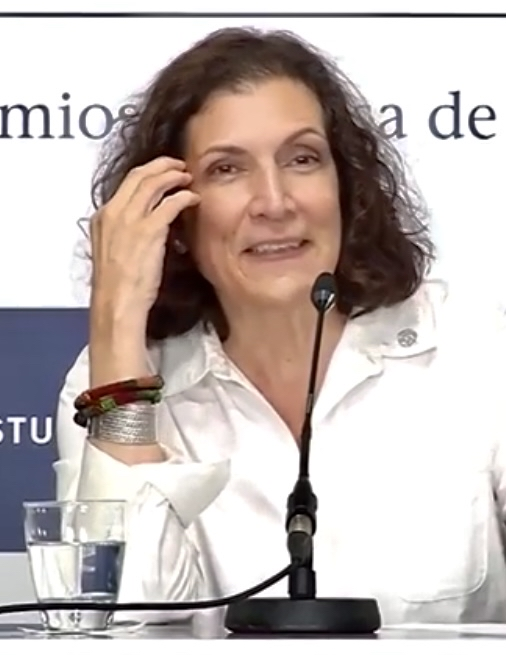
- Guillermoprieto in 2018
- Born: Alma Estela Guillermo Prieto; 1949 (age 76–77); Mexico
- Occupation: Journalist
- Years active: 1978 – present
- Awards: Maria Moors Cabot Award; MacArthur Fellowship; George Polk Award; Ortega y Gasset Award; Princess of Asturias Award

Alma Guillermoprieto (born Alma Estela Guillermo Prieto, 1949) is a Mexican-American journalist. She has written extensively about Latin America for the British and American press, especially The New Yorker and The New York Review of Books. Her writings have also been widely disseminated within the Spanish-speaking world and she has published eight books in both English and Spanish, and been translated into several more languages.

Guillermoprieto began her career as a dancer (later the subject of two of her books: Samba and Dancing with Cuba), before turning to journalism in 1978 and soon breaking the story of the 1981 El Mozote massacre by the army in El Salvador. In English, she has published two books collecting her long-form journalism on Latin America: The Heart That Bleeds (1994) and Looking for History (2001). She has also published three books collecting and translating her English reporting into Spanish. She has won a MacArthur Fellowship (1995), a George Polk Award (2001), and a Princess of Asturias Award (2018), among other honors.

== Early life ==
Alma Estela Guillermo Prieto was born in 1949 in Mexico City. In her teens, she moved to New York City with her mother. She studied modern dance with Merce Cunningham until 1969 when he recommended her for a job teaching at the Cuban National Schools of the Arts in Havana. She spent six months there. From 1962 to 1973, she was a professional dancer.

== Journalism career ==
In 1978, she started her journalism career as a stringer for The Guardian, where she covered the Nicaraguan Revolution. In 1981 she moved to The Washington Post and in January 1982, Guillermoprieto, then based in Mexico City, was one of two journalists (the other was Raymond Bonner of The New York Times) who broke the story of the El Mozote massacre in which some 900 villagers at El Mozote, El Salvador, were slaughtered by the Salvadoran army in December, 1981. With great hardship and at great personal risk, she was smuggled in by FMLN rebels to visit the site approximately a month after the massacre took place. When the story broke simultaneously in the Post and Times on January 27, 1982, it was dismissed as propaganda by the Reagan administration. Subsequently, however, the details of the massacre as first reported by Guillermoprieto and Bonner were verified, with widespread repercussions.

Guillermoprieto was promoted to staff writer at the Post, where she worked for two years before winning an Alicia Patterson Journalism Fellowship in 1985, funding research and writing about changes in rural life under the policies of the European Economic Community. She next became a Latin American correspondent for Newsweek, until 1987 when she left to write a book. Her first book, Samba: The Making of Brazilian Carnival (1990), was an account of a season studying at a samba school in Rio de Janeiro. It was nominated for a National Book Critics Circle Award. Also in 1990, Guillermoprieto won a Maria Moors Cabot Prize, honoring her contributions to press freedom and inter-American understanding in the Western hemisphere.

During the 1990s, she worked as a freelance writer, contributing long reported articles on Latin American culture and politics for The New Yorker, and The New York Review of Books, including on the Colombian civil war, the Shining Path during the Internal conflict in Peru, the aftermath of the "Dirty War" in Argentina, and post-Sandinista Nicaragua. Thirteen of these pieces were bundled in the book The Heart That Bleeds (1994), now considered a classic portrait of the politics and culture of Latin America during the "lost decade" (it was published in Spanish as Al pie de un volcán te escribo — Crónicas latinoamericanas in 1995).

In 1993, she published an article in The New Yorker on Pablo Escobar; this article, "Exit El Patron," was referenced in the Netflix series "Narcos".

In April 1995, at the request of Gabriel García Márquez, Guillermoprieto taught the inaugural workshop at the Fundación para un Nuevo Periodismo Iberoamericano, an institute for promoting journalism that was established by García Márquez in Cartagena de Indias, Colombia. She has since held more workshops for young journalists throughout the continent.

That same year, Guillermoprieto also received a MacArthur Fellowship.

In 2001, she was elected to the American Academy of Arts and Sciences. That year, she published a second anthology of articles, Looking for History: Latin America, collecting pieces on Cuba, Mexico and Colombia written for The New Yorker and The New York Review of Books. In a review for Foreign Affairs, Kenneth Maxwell wrote, "Guillermoprieto is well recognized for her evocative, intimate style and her sympathetic but critical insights into Latin American affairs. These skills are all on display again here…clearly a writer at the top of her form." In 2001, she also published a three-part series in The New York Review of Books on the Colombian drug trade. The series won a George Polk Award for foreign reporting. She also published a collection of articles in Spanish on the Mexican crisis, El año en que no fuimos felices.

In 2004, Guillermoprieto published a memoir, Dancing with Cuba, which revolved around the time she spent living in Cuba in her early twenties. In a review for The New York Times, Katha Pollitt praised the nuance Guillermoprieto brought to the book, as well as "sly humor, curiosity and knowledge." An excerpt from it was published in 2003 in The New Yorker.

In the fall of 2008, Guillermoprieto joined the faculty of the Center for Latin American Studies at the University of Chicago, as a Tinker Visiting professor.

In 2017, she won the Ortega y Gasset Award for her career in journalism. In 2018, she won the Princesa de Asturias Award in Communication and Humanities, Spain's most prestigious award for authors.

== Bibliography ==
- Guillermoprieto, Alma (1990). Samba: The Making of Brazilian Carnival. Knopf. ISBN 978-0-394-57189-8.
- Guillermoprieto, Alma (1994). The Heart that Bleeds: Latin America Now. Knopf. ISBN 978-0-679-42884-8.
- Guillermoprieto, Alma (1999). Los años en que no fuimos felices: crónicas de la transición mexicana (in Spanish). Plaza & Janés México. ISBN 978-968-11-0412-2.
- Guillermoprieto, Alma (2000). Las guerras en Colombia: tres ensayos (in Spanish). Aguilar. ISBN 978-958-8061-51-1.
- Guillermoprieto, Alma (2001). Looking for History: Dispatches from Latin America. Pantheon Books. ISBN 978-0-375-42094-8.
- Guillermoprieto, Alma (2004). Dancing with Cuba: A Memoir of the Revolution. Pantheon Books. ISBN 978-0-375-42093-1.
- Guillermoprieto, Alma (2011). Desde el país de nunca jamás (in Spanish). Random House Mondadori. ISBN 978-84-8306-941-7.
- Guillermoprieto, Alma (2020). ¿Será que soy feminista? (in Spanish). Literatura Random House. ISBN 978-84-397-3709-4.
