= Tewfik Mishlawi =

Tewfik Mishlawi (1935 – 24 January 2012) was a Lebanese journalist who was known in the Middle East and Arab world.

== Early life and career ==
Born 1935 in Haifa, British Mandate Palestine, Mishlawi fled to Lebanon with his family during the 1948 Palestinian expulsion and flight. Eventually becoming a naturalized Lebanese, Mishlawi studied economics at the American University of Beirut (AUB). Mishlawi did research work in the field of journalism, involving such topics as foreign perceptions of the American news media and journalism from a third world perspective.

From 1963 to 1973, Mishlawi was deputy editor in chief of The Daily Star, Lebanon's only English language daily newspaper. From 1973 to 1976, he worked as a staff reporter for the Beirut Bureau of the United Press International. From 1973 to 1985, he was Special Middle East correspondent for The Wall Street Journal, providing hard news, analysis, and features. From 1977 to 1979, he was ad hoc correspondent for BusinessWeek in New York City. From 1980 to 1983 he was special correspondent for The Times in London, providing hard news. From 1985 to 1992, he was director of training at the Center for Foreign Journalists in Reston, Virginia.

Since returning to Lebanon in 1992, he had continued working on his own periodical, the Middle East Reporter (MER), a media digest that would translate and sum up the Arabic press for foreign diplomats and academics.
