= Sambhunath (given name) =

Sambhunath or Shambhunath is an Indian masculine given name that may refer to

- Sambhunath Banerjee, Indian Bengali scholar of law
- Sambhunath Naik, Indian politician
- Sambhunath Pandit (1820–1867), Indian judge of Calcutta High Court
- Shambhunath Singh (1916–1991), Indian Hindi writer, freedom fighter, poet and social worker
