= Sol Gradman =

Israeli entrepreneur and investor

Shlomo (Sol) Gradman
- שלמה גרדמן
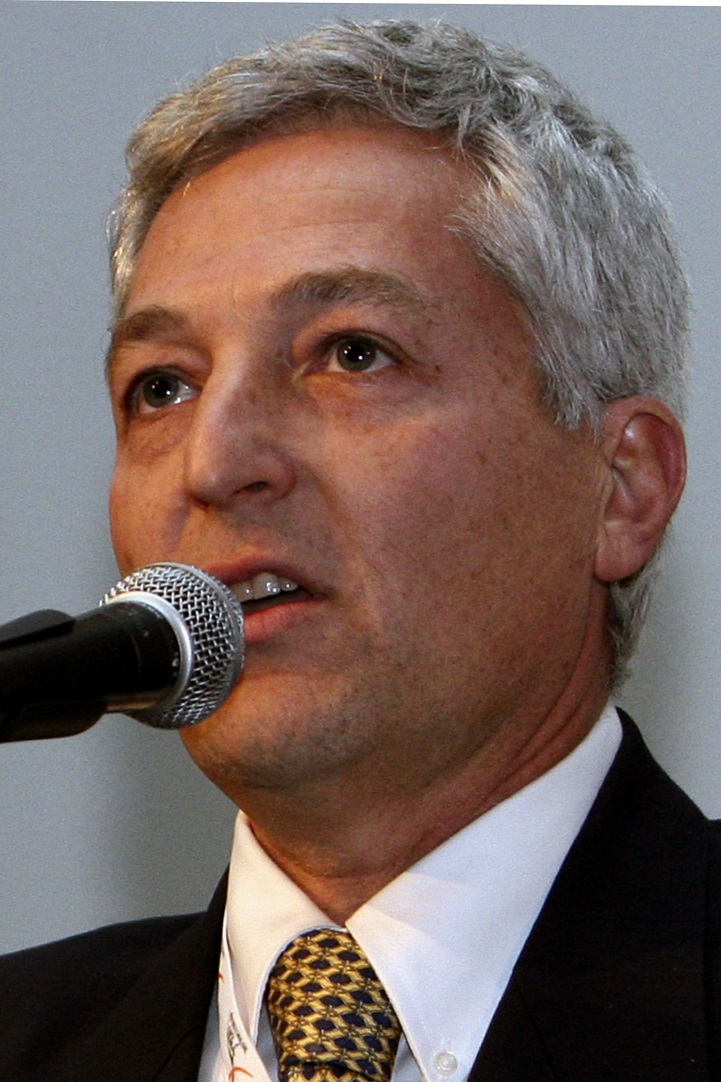
- Sol Gradman
- Born: July 24, 1956 (age 70); Haifa, Israel
- Education: Technion; Bar Ilan; Swinburne University
- Occupation: chairman of the Israeli High tech CEOs Forum
- Spouse: Ayelet Gradman
- Children: Alona Gradman; Sharon Gradman; Gil Gradman

Shlomo (Sol) Gradman (Hebrew: שלמה גרדמן; born 1956) is an Israeli entrepreneur and investor. He is a senior executive in high-tech companies and is the chairman of the Israeli high-tech CEO forum.

== Biography ==
Gradman gained his managerial and global experience while living both in Israel and the US and working for the multinationals IBM, Orbotech and ASP Computer Products. In the mid-1990s, Gradman led (as CEO/SVP) four young high technology companies to success. Three were acquired by large multinational companies and one went public in TASE.

Gradman is the Chairman of Israel's High Tech CEO Forum and the Chairman of the Israeli Semiconductor Club. In 2005 he established (in cooperation with the Raanana municipality) and chaired, the annual Raanana Conference series on Israel's High Tech national policy.

In 2004, Gradman founded and published TapeOut Magazine - the first magazine dedicated to the Israeli semiconductor industry. In 2008 he initiated the annual English ChipEx conference for the global microelectronics industry. A year later, he founded Chiporta – an on-line source for news and communication for professionals involved with the Israeli electronics industry and in 2010 he founded The Israeli Semiconductor Club – a club for the senior executives of the Israeli electronics industry. Gradman initiated in 2013 a new conference called iNNOVEX. Since then, iNNOVEX has become an annual international conference for multinational tech companies, local high tech firms, academic institutes and the relevant Israeli government ministries. In 2015, Gradman founded the DevelopEX conference which focuses on the developers of electronic systems.

Gradman is the CEO of ASG Ltd., a consulting firm that specializes in mergers, acquisitions and turnaround processes of high-tech companies.

Gradman acts as a board member of various tech related companies. He was active chairman of I Com Mobile, board member in the (public) company Calanit Carmon and acts as a director at ASG Ltd. and some other privately held companies.

Gradman holds a diploma in Electrical Engineering from the Technion - Israel Institute of Technology, a BA in Economy and Business Administration from Bar Ilan University, Israel and an MBA (with concentration on Entrepreneurship) from Swinburne University. In addition, Gradman completed the program for Business Strategies, at Stanford University, CA, USA.
