= Pandoji Kunjar =

Pandoji Kunjar (Kunjir)(Marathi: पांडोजी कुंजर / कुंजीर), was a sardar in the service of Peshwa Baji Rao II and the elder son of Sardar Balaji Kunjar. After his father Balaji Kunjar, he possess the position of Sur-Patil (सर-पाटील) at Pune Punch Mahals along with his brother Narayan Kunjar at era of Peshawa Baji Rao II.

In the early phase Baji Rao II deployed him towards Karnatak to control the opposition and administration of the maratha empire.

When Peshwa Baji Rao II was seriously alarmed by the opposition of powerful chief of maratha empire, Pathwardhan, Phadake, Raste and from Mankaris also, Baji Rao II ordered Pandoji Kunjar to raise troops to fight against opposition and gives Rs. 10000. He tried to oppose the Holkar army at Gar Dond to resist lead towards Pune. He was also part of Peshwas Army that fought against the Holkar Army at Baramati.

== See also ==
- Battle of Poona
- Yashwantrao Holkar

== Reference links ==
- "GAZETTEER OF THE BOMBAY PRESIDENCY - POONA". pune.gov.in. 2014-04-22. Archived from the original on 2014-04-22.
- Kincaid, C. A. (1916). The Tale Of The Tulasi Plant And Other Stories. BOMBAY.
- Chaurasia, R.S. (2004). History of the Marathas. Atlantic Publishers & Distributors. ISBN 9788126903948.
- Sarkar, J. (1992). Fall of the Mughal Empire: 1789–1803. Sangam. ISBN 978-0-86131-749-3.
