= Anton Samba =

Indonesian footballer

Personal information
- Full name: Anton Samba
- Date of birth: 5 April 1982 (age 44)
- Place of birth: Maros, Indonesia
- Height: 1.70 m (5 ft 7 in)
- Position: Defensive midfielder

Senior career*
Years	Team	Apps	(Gls)
2001–2003	Persim Maros	47	(2)
2004–2006	Persiba Balikpapan	36	(0)
2007–2008	Arema	18	(0)
2008–2009	Persiwa Wamena	23	(0)
2009	Persikad Depok	11	(0)
2009–2010	Persidafon Dafonsoro	10	(0)
2010–2011	Persikabo Bogor	21	(2)
2011–2012	PSMS Medan	26	(0)
2012–2013	Persepam Madura Utama	8	(0)
2013–2014	Persifa Fakfak	6	(0)
2014–2015	Persatu Tuban	19	(0)
2016–2017	Persika Karawang	20	(0)
2017–2018	Yahukimo	12	(0)
- * Club domestic league appearances and goals

Anton Samba (born April 5, 1982) is an Indonesian former footballer.

== Club statistics ==
Club	Season	Super League		Premier Division		Piala Indonesia		Total	
Club	Season	Apps	Goals	Apps	Goals	Apps	Goals	Apps	Goals
PSMS Medan	2011-12	26	0	-		-		26	0
Total		26	0	-		-		26	0

== Hounors ==
=== Clubs ===
- Persiwa Wamena :
  - Indonesia Super League runner-up : 1 (2008-09)
