= Samba: The Making of Brazilian Carnival =

1990 novel by Alma Guillermoprieto

- Author: Alma Guillermoprieto
- Publisher: Alfred A. Knopf
- Publication date: February 20, 1989
- ISBN: 0-679-73256-X

Samba: The Making of Brazilian Carnival is a non-fiction book by Mexican writer Alma Guillermoprieto, published in 1990 by Alfred A. Knopf. The book follows the author as she joins a team of samba dancers in a favela to enter the annual Brazilian Carnival, which all in the community contribute to, despite their poverty and the high cost of preparations.

== Reception ==
Kirkus Reviews referred to the book as "a well-researched and intelligent look at the world of samba and, through it, the history and modern-day culture of black Brazilians." Publishers Weekly also provided a positive review, noting that "Guillermoprieto vividly presents the individual stories of principal participants, analyzes the feelings they express in their music and dance, describes the contributions of the various samba schools and offers... interpretation of black Brazilian history and culture." The Washington Post called Samba "the single best book ever written about the central place of music in the life of the Third World".

Samba was nominated for the 1990 National Book Critics Circle Award.
