= Chhatrapati Sambhaji (1934 film) =

- Directed by: Parshwanath Altekar
- Written by: D. K. Kane
- Starring: See below
- Cinematography: S. D. Patil
- Edited by: R. D. Thite
- Music by: Annasaheb Mainkar
- Production company: Saraswati Cinetone
- Release date: 1934
- Country: India
- Language: Marathi

Chhatrapati Sambhaji is a 1934 Indian Marathi-language historical film directed by Parshwanath Altekar, from a story and screenplay by D. K. Kane. The film stars Master Vithal, Dada Salvi, Vasantrao Pahelwan, Javadekar, Vijayadevi, Shakuntala, Kishori Ingle, Shahir Nanivadekar, Varne, Kamble, Patil.

== Plot ==
In the dramatic saga of Sambhaji's reign, suspicion seeped into his closest allies, turning friends into foes. Ganoji Shirke, driven by a thirst for revenge, plotted against him, while even the loyal Tulsi, who had once sacrificed all for Sambhaji, harbored vindictive thoughts. Dominated by the cunning Kabji, Sambhaji's downfall seemed inevitable. Captured by Mukbar Khan and delivered to Aurangzeb's court, Sambhaji faced the ultimate test of faith. Despite relentless torture, he remained steadfast, refusing to yield to Aurangzeb's demands to convert to Islam, sealing his fate with a martyr's bravery.

== Cast ==
- Master Vithal
- Dada Salvi
- Vasantrao Pahelwan
- Javadekar
- Vijayadevi
- Shakuntala
- Kishori Ingle
- Shahir Nanivadekar
- Varne, Kamble

== Filming ==
The film was shot in Pune.
