= Dina Feldman =

Israeli psychologist

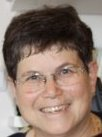
Dina Feldman

Dina Feldman (Hebrew: דינה פלדמן) is the second Israeli Commissioner for Equal Rights of Persons with Disabilities, an activist in the areas of human rights, women's equal opportunity, cross cultural, educational and interfaith dialogue, and in the preservation of the history of the Jews in Poland, before, during and after the Holocaust.

== Biography ==
Feldman is a clinical psychologist, born in 1950, in Haifa, Israel, to Abraham Mevarech (BĘCZKOWSKI), a pioneer of the Mizrachi movement in Piotrków Trybunalski, Poland and of Hapoel HaMizrachi in Israel, and Paula (née Drobner – Gast), born in Vienna, Austria.

Between 1973 and 1993, Feldman served as a psychologist in the Israel Defense Forces: the Women and Medical Corps. Between 1993 and 1999, she was on the team that planned the Israeli Mental Health Reform. Between 2002 and 2007, Feldman served as the Israeli Commissioner for Equal Rights of Persons with Disabilities and established the Israeli Commission for Equal Rights of Persons with Disabilities in the Ministry of Justice (Israel). Further, Feldman was active in the legislation of the Accessibility Chapter of the Israeli Equal Rights for Persons with Disabilities Law in 1998, which passed in 2005, and headed the Israeli team in writing the UN Convention on the Rights of Persons with Disabilities, 2007. Between 2009 and 2010, she was a committee member and then executive director of "Kolech – Religious Women Forum". Since 2010, she has been active in the preservation of the history of the Jews in Poland, before, during and after the Holocaust, and in cross cultural, educational and interfaith dialogue.

== Publications ==
  - Feldman, D. (ed.) Abram Mevarech. “I am traveling to the Land of Israel”. Memoire of the “Hamizrachi” pioneer from Poland and Mandatory Land of Israel. Holon: Pages Tell. 2024. (in Hebrew).
- Feldman, D., Rzędowska A., Piotrków Trybunalski Ghetto - The First in Occupied Poland. Holon: Pages Telling. 2023.
  - Feldman, D. Die Straßen des Ghettos Piotrków Trybunalski 1939–1943: Sozialräumliche Aspekte der deutschen Verfolgung" . In Christine Schindler, Wolfgang Schellenbacher (eds.) Delogiert und ghettoisiert. Jüdinnen und Juden vor der Deportation. Vienna: Documentation Centre of Austrian Resistance (DÖW-Jahrbuch, 2022. Pp. 157 – 204. (in German)
  - Feldman, D, (ed.), Yarkoni, H. (translator). Zygmunt Tenenbaum. Tales of Old Piotrkow. Holon: Orion publication, 2016. (in Hebrew)
- Rzędowska A., Feldman D., Getto Żydówskie W Okupowanym Piotrkówie, Piotrków Tryb.: Biblioteka Piotrków 800, 2014. (in Polish)
- Feldman-Mevarech, D. and Boneh-Levi, Y. Jewish Trilogy from Poland. Holon: Orion. 2013. (in Hebrew)
- Feldman, D. The equality for People with Disabilities Law, 1998: at the crossroads between Charity and Right, 2010.
- Feldman, D. Shlesinger, M. Shedletzky, I. Five Hebrew Translations of Else Lasker-Schüler's Poem "An mein Kind". Nashim. 2010. Number 19: 176–198.
- Feldman, D. Human Rights of Children with Disabilities in Israel : The Vision and the Reality, Disability Studies Quarterly, Winter.2009. Vol. 29(1).
- Feldman, D. "Environmental Justice" and Persons with Disabilities in Israel. Disability Studies Quarterly, Fall, 2007. Vol. 27(4).
- Feldman, D. Lahav, Y. & Haimovitz, S. (Eds.). Accessibility for Persons with Disabilities in Israel. LAPAM, Tel Aviv. 2007. (in Hebrew)
- Feldman, D. Danieli Lahav, Y. Haimovitz, S. The Accessibility of the Israeli Society for Persons with Disabilities on the Threshold of the 21st Century - Introduction In: D. Feldman, Y. Danieli Lahav, Y. & S. Haimovitz, (Eds). The Accessibility of the Israeli Society for Persons with Disabilities on the Threshold of the 21st Century. LAPAM, Tel Aviv. 2007.
- Feldman, D. Environmental Justice for Persons with Disabilities in Israel – the Vision and the implementation In: D. Feldman, Y. Danieli Lahav,. & S. Haimovitz, (Eds). The Accessibility of the Israeli Society for Persons with Disabilities on the Threshold of the 21st Century. LAPAM, Tel Aviv. 2007. pp. 31–79.
- Feldman, D. Danieli Lahav, Y. Malul, E. Silovsky, D. Professionalization in the Area of Accessibility for Persons with Disabilities in Israel In: D. Feldman, Y. Danieli Lahav & S. Haimovitz, (Eds). The Accessibility of the Israeli Society for Persons with Disabilities on the Threshold of the 21st Century.LAPAM, Tel Aviv. 2007. pp. 431–476.
- Feldman, D. The Rights of Children with Disabilities in Israel – in the Front of the 21st Century. In S. Reiter. Y. Lazar, G. Avisar. Shiluvim: Learners with Disabilities in the Educational Systems. Achva, Haifa, 2007. pp. 89–142.
- Feldman, D. The Implication of the Israeli Equal Right's Law on the life of Persons with Psychiatric Challenges – is there any Light in the End of the Tunnel? In N. Hadas – Lidor and M. Lachman (Eds.) Rehabilitation and Recovery Readings. in the Mental Health Field From Different Perspectives: Practice, Policy and Research. Litom Publishers, Kefar Yona, 2007. pp. 203– 271.
- Feldman, D. The Rights of Persons with Intellectual Disabilities in Israel – the Reality and the challenges In M. Hovav and P. Gitelman From Segregation to Inclusion. Persons with Disabilities in the Community. Carmel Publishing House. Jerusalem. 2006. pp. 21– 63.
- Feldman, D. The Mental Health Clinics in Israel: Trends and Changes in the Last Decade. In: U. Aviram and Y. Ginat. (Eds.). Mental health Services in Israel: Trends and Issues, Cherikover Publication, Azur. 2006. pp. 281– 304.
- Feldman, D. Epilog: The Inclusion of Persons with Disabilities in the Working Market in Israel. In H.Viscardi. Give us the tools. Achva Publication, Haifa. 2005. pp. 189– 193.
- Feldman, D, Shaping Vision into Policy and its Implementation - Persons with Disabilities in Israel. Bridges: Israeli- Palestinian: Public Health Magazine. February–March. 2005. Vol. 1(2):8-12.
- Feldman, D, Affirmative Action in the Working Market for Persons with Learning Disabilities in Israel. Schish: Issues in Special Education and rehabilitation Journal. 2005.Vol. 20 (1): 13-29 (In Hebrew).
- Feldman, D. The Employment of Persons with Disabilities in Israel - The Equal Right's Law's Perspective. Hadea Harovahat. 2005. Vol. 39. 11–15. (In Hebrew).
- Feldman, D. & Yahalom, S. Affirmative Action for Persons with Disabilities in Israel. In: A. Maor (Ed.) Affirmative Action and Equal Representation in Israel. Ramot Publication, Tel Aviv University. 2004. pp. 399–426.
- Feldman, D. The Mental Health Clinics in Israel. Society and Welfare. 2003. June, 23(2): 199-225 (In Hebrew)
- Feldman, D. Utilization of Mental Health Services - An Integrative Model . Society and Welfare. 2002. Vol. 22(3): 295–323. (In Hebrew).
- Feldman, D, & Bar on, J. Supplying “Rehabilitation Basket” to Persons with Mental Illness, and their Families, in the Community; A Demonstrative Governmental Program of Partnership between the Health and the Welfare Systems. Social Security. 2001. Vol. 61: 80-107 (In Hebrew).
