= Rachel Adato =

Israeli gynaecologist

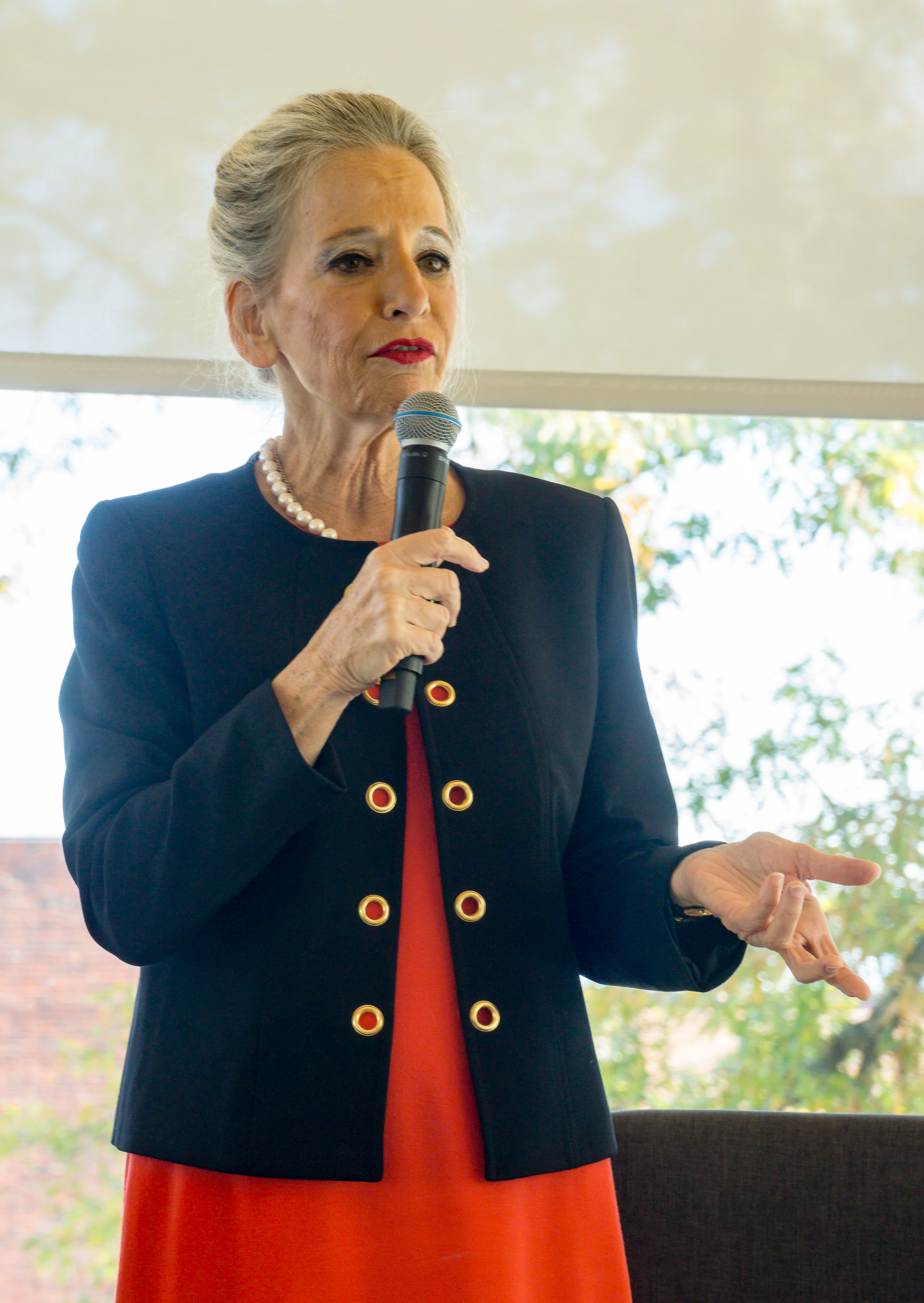
- Adato in 2018

Faction represented in the Knesset
- 2009–2012: Kadima
- 2012–2013: Hatnuah

Personal details
- Born: 21 June 1947 (age 79) Haifa, Mandatory Palestine

Dr Rachel Adato-Levy (Hebrew: רחל אדטו-לוי; born 21 June 1947) is an Israeli gynaecologist, lawyer and politician who served as a member of the Knesset for Kadima and Hatnuah between 2009 and 2013.

== Biography ==
Born in Haifa in 1947, Adato attended the Hebrew Reali School. She gained a Doctor of Medicine degree from the Hebrew University of Jerusalem, as well as an MBA and a degree in law from Ono Academic College. She served as a senior doctor at the women's department of Hadassah Medical Center at Mount Scopus, becoming Deputy Director of Hadassah Hospital at Ein Kerem in 1993. In 1995 she became vice-president of Sha'arei Tzedek Medical Center. From 1997 she acted as a consultant to the Minister of Health on the topic of women's health, and since 1999 has chaired the National Women's Health Association.

A former member of the Likud central committee, Adato served on Mevaseret Zion city council. She won thirty-fifth place on the Kadima list prior to the 2006 Knesset elections, but missed out as the party won only 29 seats. However, for the 2009 elections she was placed twenty-second and entered the Knesset as the party won 28 seats.

Prior to the 2013 elections she joined the new Hatnuah party, and was placed sixteenth on its list. She lost her seat when the party won only six seats.

Married with two children, Adato lives in Mevaseret Zion.
