= Samir Habiby =

American priest (born 1933)

Rev. Canon Samir Jamil Habiby
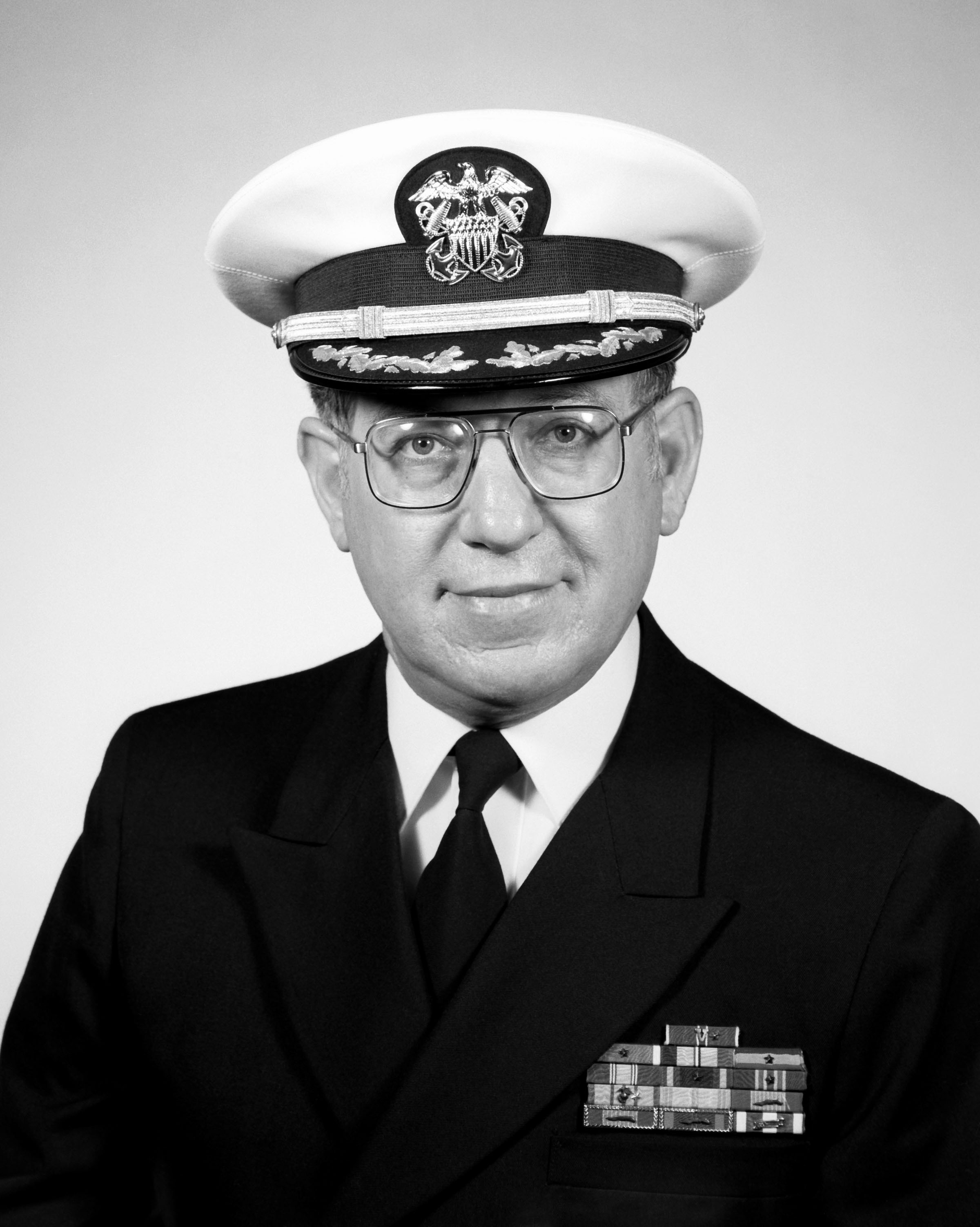
- Habiby in 1983

Personal details
- Born: April 18, 1933 (age 93) Haifa, Mandatory Palestine
- Spouses: Kay Sprinkel (m. 1960–1969) Kathryn Sophia Ganitch (m. 1972)
- Children: 5
- Education: Phillips University (BA); Church Divinity School of the Pacific (MDiv)
- Occupation: Priest; military chaplain; humanitarian

Military service
- Branch/service: United States Marine Corps
- Years of service: 1965–1970
- Rank: Commander
- Battles/wars: Vietnam War
- Awards: Bronze Star Medal (2) with Combat "V"; Purple Heart

Samir Jamil Habiby (born April 18, 1933) is a Palestinian American Episcopal pastor, military chaplain, and humanitarian. He served as the director of the St. Anselm's Indochinese Community Center from 1976 to 1977, assisting Vietnamese refugees in the US. From 1977 to 2004, he served as the executive director of the Presiding Bishop's Fund for World Relief, later called the Episcopal Relief & Development.

Born in Haifa, Habiby later emigrated to the United States in 1954. After becoming an Episcopal priest, he later served a military chaplain from 1965 to 1970 during the Vietnam War. Afterwards, he worked on assisting Vietnamese refugees in Orange County, California after the fall of Saigon. He also completed humanitarian work on behalf of the Episcopal Church.

== Biography ==
=== Early life ===
Habiby was born on April 18, 1933, in Haifa, Mandatory Palestine. His father, Jamil, served as a high judge. Habiby had six siblings; he and his family were Arab Anglican Palestinians. Due to attacks from the terrorist group Irgun Zvei Leumi, the Anglican school Habiby attended was closed, and he lived with his uncle to attend an Anglican school in Cairo, Egypt.

When Haifa was taken by Israeli forces in 1948, the Habiby family could no longer return to Haifa as their family properties had been seized. Hence, Habiby remained in Egypt for the next few years, attending high school and medical school. He befriended Yasser Arafat while at Cairo University and worked with him to establish the Federation of Palestinian Students at Egyptian Universities. Habiby helped convince the then-president of Egypt, Gamal Abdel Nasser, to continue providing scholarships to Palestinian students.

=== Emigration to United States ===
In 1954, Habiby received a scholarship to study in the United States, ultimately graduating from Phillips University with a bachelor's in 1955. While he initially intended to become a doctor of medicine to best help others, he later instead set his mind on becoming a priest. In 1958, he received his M. Div. degree from the Church Divinity School of the Pacific and was ordained a deacon in the same year. The next year, he was made a priest. In the early 1960s, his ministry included being an associate Episcopal chaplain at UCLA and a rector in South Gate, California. In 1964, Habiby became an American citizen. During the Watts riots, he met with Martin Luther King Jr. to assist in a dispute between landlords and tenants.

=== Naval Chaplain Corps ===
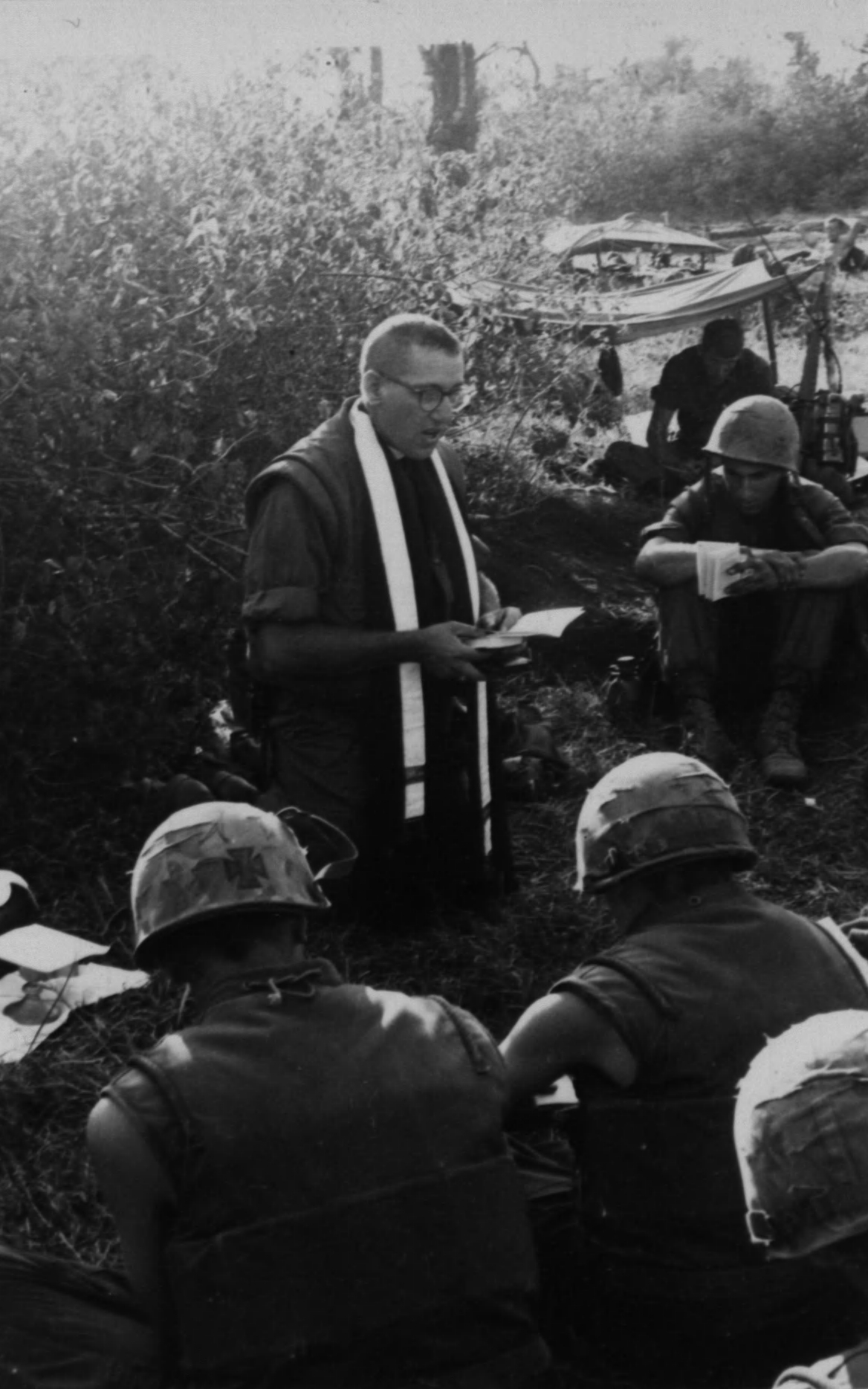
Habiby reads from scripture near the DMZ during Operation Kentucky in 1968

In 1965, the Episcopal Church endorsed Habiby for the Naval Chaplain Corps. Habiby served the first of two tours as a Navy chaplain in Vietnam, assigned to the 9th Marine Amphibious Brigade. His second tour took place at the Naval Air Facility in Cam Ranh Bay from 1968 to 1969. Habiby was released from active duty in 1970, ultimately earning two Bronze Stars and a Purple Heart after being injured during a vehicular attack.

=== Southeast Asian refugees assistance ===
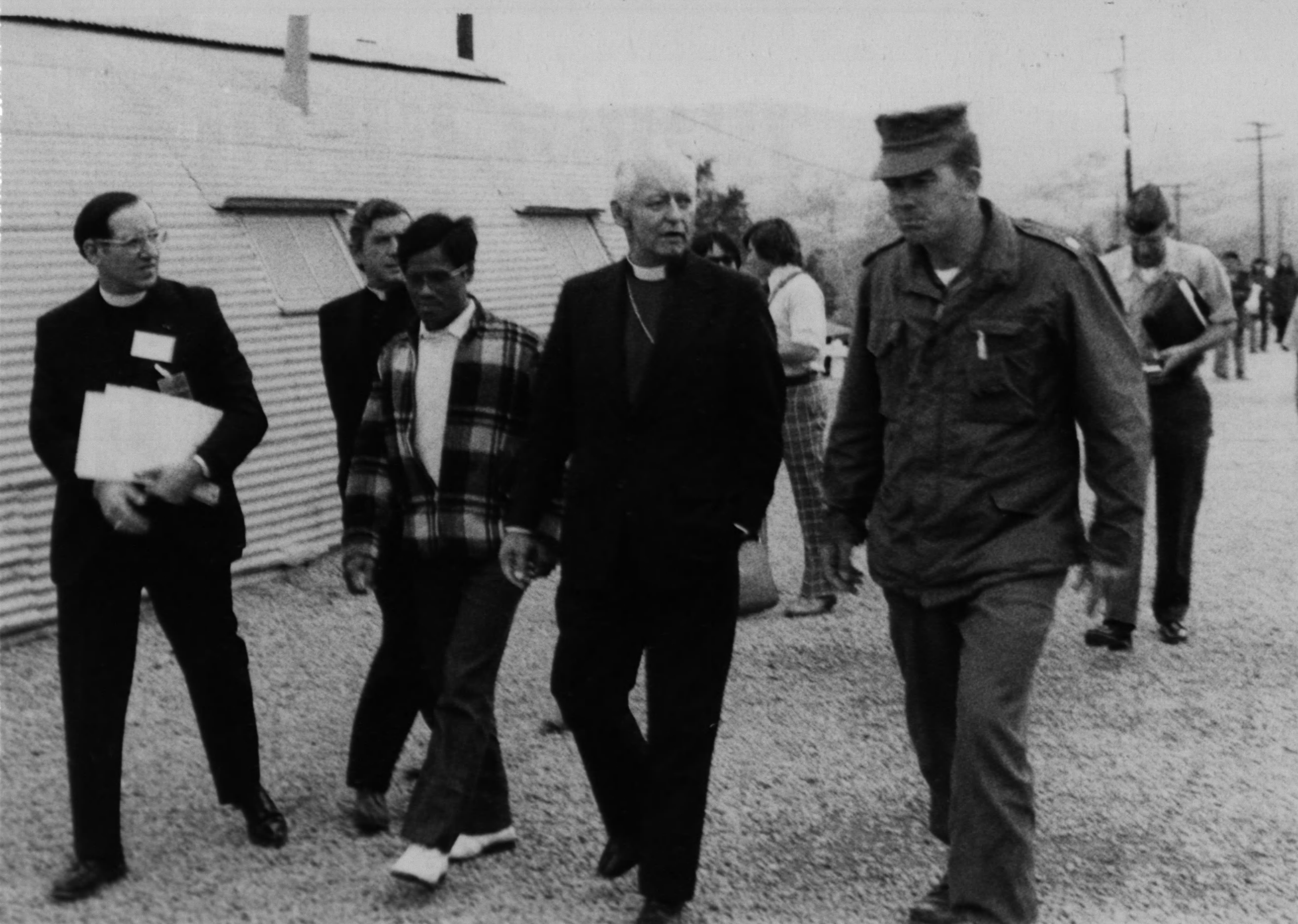
Reverend S.J. Habiby (left) and others tour Camp Pendleton refugee camps in 1975

Later, in early 1970, he was asked by St. Anselm church in Garden Grove to become their third rector. In 1975, he brought food and clothes to Vietnamese evacuees at Camp Pendleton. Starting in May 1975, he served as the West Coast coordinator of the Southeast Asian refugee resettlement program of the Episcopal Church.

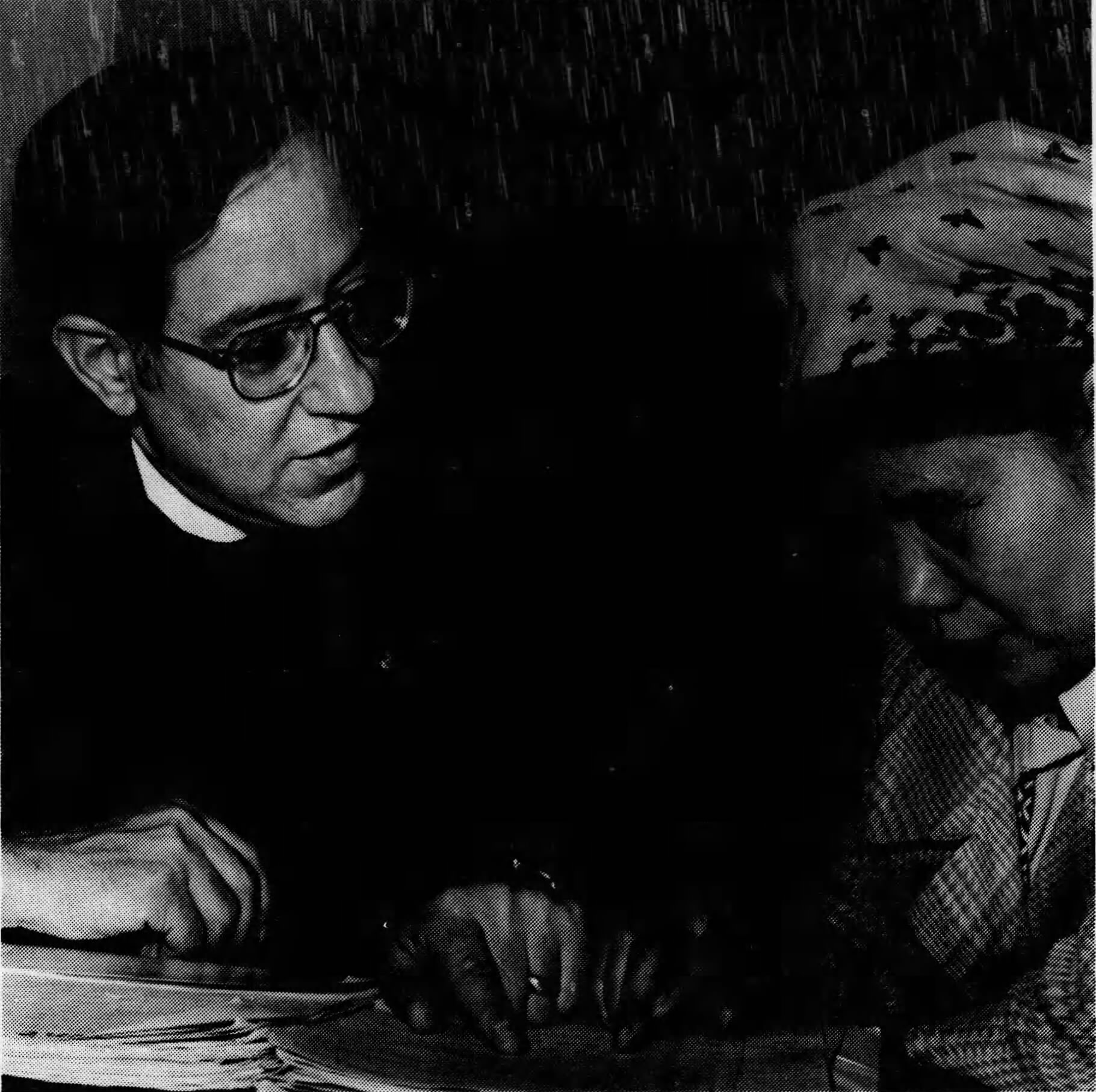
Habiby helps Mhiem Thi Vu, a Vietnamese refugee, with reading and writing, 1978

In 1976, Habiby formed St. Anselm's Indochinese Community Center to assist Vietnamese refugees. It was initially granted a two-year grant from the Church World Service of the National Council of Churches to assist Indochinese refugees. He also served as chairman of the Orange County Southeast Asian Refugee Interagency Forum.

Tom Berg of The Orange County Register opined that Habiby's work "planted the seeds for what would become the largest Vietnamese-American community in America," referring to Little Saigon, Orange County.

=== Humanitarianism ===
On December 22, 1977, Habiby was appointed as the executive director of the Episcopal Church's Presiding Bishop's Fund for World Relief, a position involving disaster relief, refugee services, and regional and local world relief programs. Hence, in March 1979, he moved to New York and assumed his new post on Easter. As executive director, Habiby worked with United Nations agencies and the US government to provide assistance to people in poverty or in war-torn countries.

In the 1980s, he helped launch the Anglican Child Care Fund during Ethiopia's famine.

In 1985, Habiby was asked by his church to assist Terry Waite, which led to him playing a role in negotiations for the release of US hostages in Lebanon. Two years later, he spoke for Terry Waite when he was honored in absentia after going missing for about a month. After several years in Connecticut and Georgia, he moved to Lausanne, Switzerland, due to its proximity to the United Nations hub in Geneva.

He retired in 2004 and moved to Swanzey, New Hampshire. In 2006, he was involved in peace efforts in Eastern Sudan. As of 2006, Habiby also lectured at the Naval War College and preached at the St. James Episcopal Church in Keene, New Hampshire.

== Personal life ==
He married Kay Sprinkel in 1960 and had three children; they later separated while Habiby was in Vietnam. In 1972, he was married to Kathryn Sophia Ganitch by Francis Eric Bloy and has two stepdaughters with her.
