= Samba (given name) =

Samba is a masculine given name which may refer to:

- Samba Camara (born 1992), French footballer
- Samba Diakité (born 1989), French former footballer
- Samba Diallo (born 2003), Senegalese footballer
- Samba Diallo (died 2012), former colonel and head of military intelligence assassinated during the 2012 Guinea-Bissau presidential election
- Samba Diawara (born 1978), French former footballer
- Samba Lélé Diba (born 2003), Senegalese footballer
- Samba Faye (born 1987), Senegalese-born Japanese professional basketball player
- Samba Konaté (born 2009), French footballer
- Samba Koné (born 2002), Malian footballer
- Samba Mapangala, Congolese singer and bandleader
- Samba Ndiaye (c. 1810–c. 1890), chief military engineer of the Toucouleur Empire, artillery officer and diplomat
- Samba N'Diaye (born 1972), Senegalese former footballer
- Samba Félix Ndiaye (1945–2009), Senegalese filmmaker
- Samba Sangare (1939–2011), Malian soldier who participated in a failed 1969 coup to overthrow Moussa Traoré and wrote a memoir of his experiences in prison
- Samba Schutte (fl. 2007–present), Mauritanian-Dutch actor, comedian and writer
- Samba Sillah (born 1998), Finnish footballer
- Samba Ousemane Sow (born 1964), Malian doctor, World Health Organization director general of the Center for Vaccine Development in Mali and professor
- Samba Sow (footballer, born 1984), Senegalese footballer
- Samba Sow (footballer, born 1989), Malian footballer
- Samba Diouldé Thiam, Senegalese politician
- Samba Touré (born 1968), Malian singer and guitarist
