= Armed Forces Chaplaincy Center =

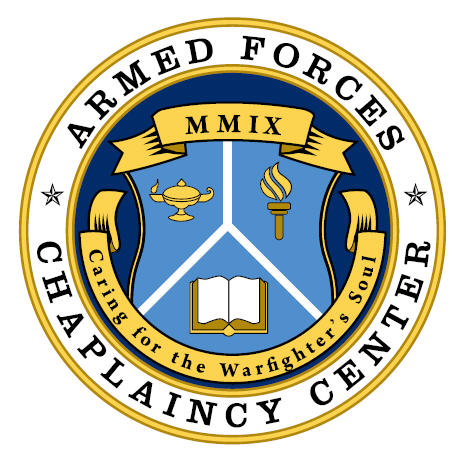
Official seal of the Armed Forces Chaplaincy Center

The Armed Forces Chaplaincy Center (AFCC) was the center for training of United States military chaplains, located at Fort Jackson, Columbia, South Carolina. Co-located on the AFCC campus were: the United States Army Chaplain Center and School, the United States Naval Chaplaincy School and Center, and the United States Air Force Chaplain Corps College. The Center included the "Joint Center of Excellence for Religious Training and Education."

Ground-breaking for the AFCC took place 6 May 2008, and the official dedication of the campus occurred on 6 May 2010.

The Air Force Chaplain Corps College returned to Maxell AFB, AL in 2017. The United States Naval Chaplaincy School returned to NAVSTA Newport, RI in 2019.

== History ==
The creation of the AFCC began with the 11 November 2005 "Base Realignment and Closure" (BRAC) mandate for U.S. military chaplains. The mandated included two "imperatives":

- (1) Relocate to Fort Jackson, in Columbia, South Carolina, the location of the US Army Chaplain Center and School: the Naval Chaplains School from Newport, Rhode Island, the Religious Programs Specialist training from Meridian, Mississippi, and the Air Force Chaplain Service Institute from Maxwell Air Force Base, Montgomery, Alabama;
- (2) Establish the Joint Center of Excellence for Religious Training and Education.

The decision to create the AFCC included an 11.6 million dollar construction plan for a building with 45,800 square feet (4,250 m^{2}) of space, including a 300-seat auditorium.

=== Relocation milestones ===
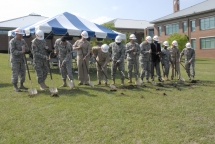
AFCC ground breaking, 6 May 2008

- 11 November 2005 - BRAC Mandate
- 1 June 2007 - USA assumes AFFC Directorship
- 6 May 2008 - Ground breaking
- 1 July 2008 - AFCC Directorship transferred to USN
- 1 July 2009 - AFCC Directorship transferred to USAF
- January 2010 - Schools move into new facility
- January 2010 - First USN classes in new facility
- 6 Jan 2010 - First event in new facility: Interservice prayer
- January–April 2010 - Furnishings and AV/IT installed
- March 2010 - First USAF classes in new facility
- 6 May 2010 - AFCC, Air Force, Navy Dedication ceremonies

== Mission and leadership ==
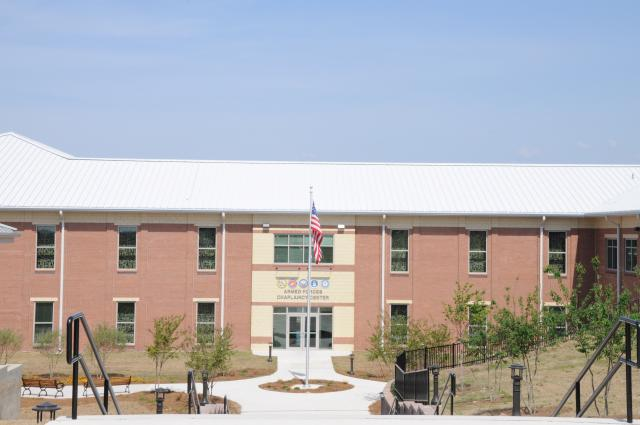
AFCC, days before official 6 May 2010 dedication

The Army, Navy, and Air Force schools were co-located on the AFCC campus, but their training programs for Chaplains, Chaplain Assistants and Religious Program Specialists were independent, and each has its own Commandant/Commanding Officer, faculty and staff. There was an overall Director and Senior Enlisted Advisor who deal with common issues affecting all schools, but each of the three schools maintained its own lines of authority and responsibility with the Chief of Chaplains and training leadership for its branch of the Armed Forces.

However, although each service school trained its chaplains, sharing the AFCC campus allowed for some joint classes and lectures, especially when guest lecturers in subjects like preaching—subjects that cross military service lines—visited the center.

== Setting ==
The first AFCC director Air Force Chaplain Col. Steven Keith, said the directors of the individual schools that will share the AFCC campus worked to bring together elements with special meaning that could be shared. For example, the center's hallways have stained glass from a closed Army chapel in New Jersey and a closed Air Force chapel in Germany.

To set the tone for the center, a famous image of George Washington, kneeling in prayer with his chaplain and soldiers at Valley Forge was chosen for the front lobby.

== U.S. Army Institute for Religious Leadership ==
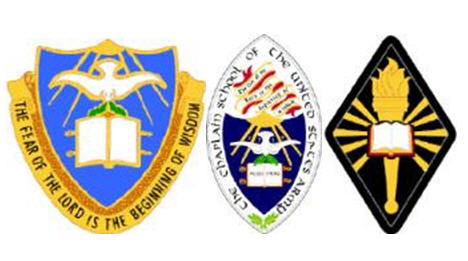
USA Chaplain Center and School unit insignia, device, and sleeve insignia

The U.S. Army Chaplain School was created in 1917, to train civilian clergy for service as chaplains in World War I. The first session began 3 March 1918, at Fort Monroe, Virginia, based on a plan developed by Chaplain (MAJ) Aldred A. Pruden, approved by the War Department on 9 February 1918.

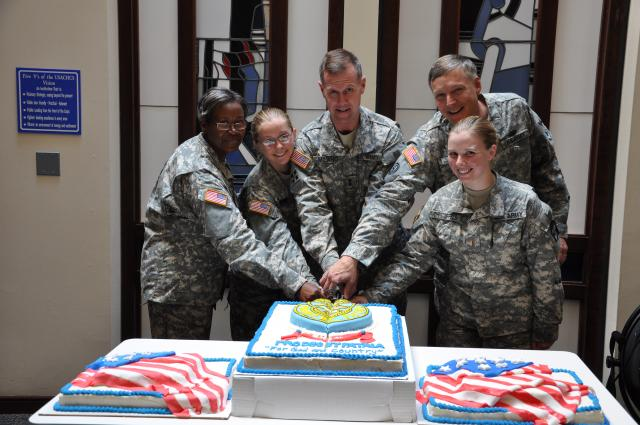
Celebrating the Army Chaplaincy's 235th anniversary with a ceremonial cake cutting at the Army Chaplain Center and School, 30 July 2010

Before moving to its present location at Fort Jackson in 1996, the school has been located in areas including Camp Zachary Taylor (Kentucky), Camp Grant (Illinois), Fort Leavenworth (Kansas), Fort Benjamin Harrison (Indiana), Harvard University (Massachusetts), Fort Devens (Mass.), Fort Oglethorpe (Georgia), Carlisle Barracks (Pennsylvania), Fort Slocum (New York) (1951–62), Fort Hamilton (N.Y.) (1962–74), Fort Wadsworth (N.Y.) (1974–79), and Fort Monmouth (New Jersey) (1979–95).

In 1957, Army General Order No. 1-57, created the U.S. Army Chaplain Museum as a branch museum at Fort Slocum, New York, later moving along with the Chaplain Center and School to all other locations, including the current site at Fort Jackson. On 28 February 2022 the U.S. Army Chaplain Center and School was renamed to the U.S. Army Institute for Religious Leadership.

== Naval Chaplaincy School and Center ==
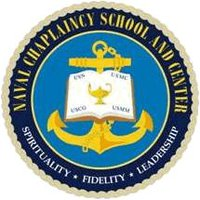
US Naval Chaplaincy School and Center seal

The first Naval Chaplain School was created in February 1942 when civilian clergy, the majority of whom had no prior military experience, entered the Navy to serve during World War II. The school began at Naval Station Norfolk, Norfolk, Virginia, later moving to the campus of the College of William and Mary, in Williamsburg, Virginia, until its decommissioning 15 November 1945.

With the beginning of the Korean War in 1951, the school was reestablished, located in Newport, Rhode Island as part of the Naval Schools Command. When the Naval Officer Training Center was established 15 July 1971, later becoming the Naval Officer Training Command on 1 July 1974, the school continued to operate under that Center and Command, until the school became a separate shore activity in March 2007 under the Center for Service Support.

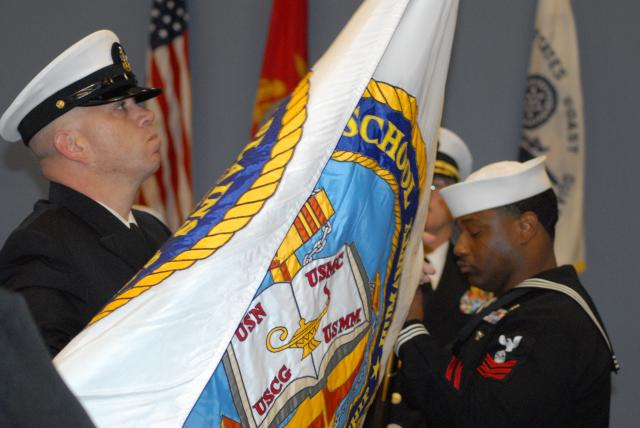
New flag for the Naval Chaplain School and Center is prepared for the first Navy chaplain graduation at Ft. Jackson, Nov 2009.

The Chaplain School ceased activities in Newport 21 August 2009 for its move to Fort Jackson, and its name was changed on 1 October 2009 to the Naval Chaplaincy School and Center (NCSC), to reflect the fact that the school would no longer only train chaplains, but would now include training for Religious Program Specialists, as well.

The first graduation of Navy chaplains at the AFCC took place 13 November 2009.

== Air Force Chaplain Corps College ==
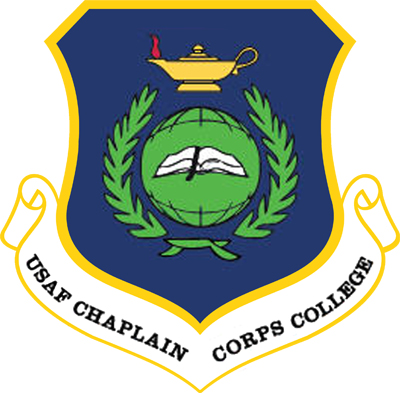
USAF Chaplain Corps College seal

In July 1953 the Air Force was given the responsibility of training its own chaplains, and the United States Air Force Chaplains Course was established at Lackland Air Force Base in Texas, under the overall Officer Basic Military Course In 1960 the USAF Chaplain School was officially established, remaining at Lackland AFB, where it remained until moving to Maxwell Air Force Base, Montgomery, Alabama, in May 1966, where it would remain until its move to Fort Jackson.

Under the leadership of the Air University Command Chaplain, the USAF Chaplain Service Resource Board was formed in July 1959. It was originally named the USAF Chaplain Writers Board, preparing lectures and identifying audiovisual resources for the Air Force Moral Leadership Program.

The board's name was changed in 1976 to USAF Chaplain Resource Board, and in January 1989 to USAF Chaplain Service Resource Board, "to reflect the mission of providing resources to all chaplain service professionals: chaplain service support personnel (CSSP), religious education coordinators, laity, and chaplains." It is now known as the USAF Chaplain Service Institute Resource Division.

Air Force Chaplain Assistants began training at Carlisle Barracks, Pennsylvania, in 1960, as "Welfare specialists", moving to Keesler Air Force Base, Mississippi in 1960 at the same time the specialty name was changed to "Chaplain Service Personnel". In 1992, training moved to Maxwell AFB, where it became part of the "Ira C. Eaker Center for Professional Development," alongside the Air Force Chaplain School and Air Force Chaplain Service Institute.

== Photo gallery ==
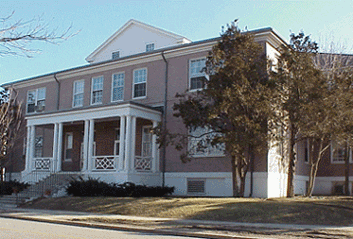
Naval Chaplains School building 1978–2009, Newport, RI

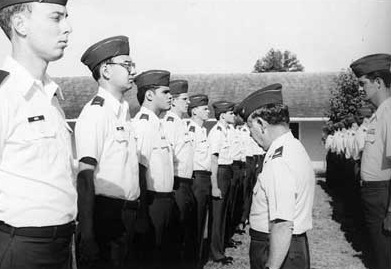
Air Force Chaplain School Commandant Colonel (Chaplain) Donald Harlin inspects chaplain-candidates attending a two-week training course at the school during the 80s when it was located at Maxwell AFB

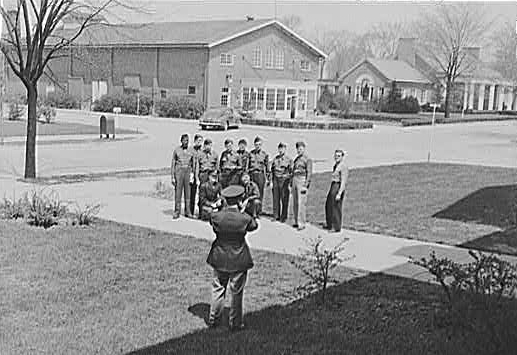
Students at Army Chaplain School, Ft Benjamin J. Harrison, pose for a graduation photo, April 1942

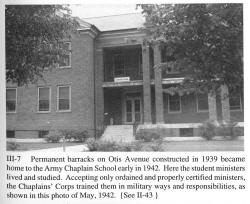
Army Chaplains School building, located at Fort Benjamin Harrison as of 1942

== See also ==
- United States military chaplain symbols
- Insignia of chaplain schools in the United States military
