= Sambhajirao Kunjir =

Indian politician

Sambhajirao Ramchandra Kunjir is an Indian politician and a former MLA (1980–85) of Purandhar (Saswad), Pune.

== Political career ==
Sambhajirao Ramchandra Kunjir, contested from Purandhar constituency, Maharashtra for period of 1980 - 85. He was candidate of Indian National Congress (U) political party, had 23,901 votes. He won over Dada Jadhavrao, candidate of Janata Party (JP) by 726 vote & was elected as MLA.
