= Shamba (agroforestry system) =

Agroforestry system

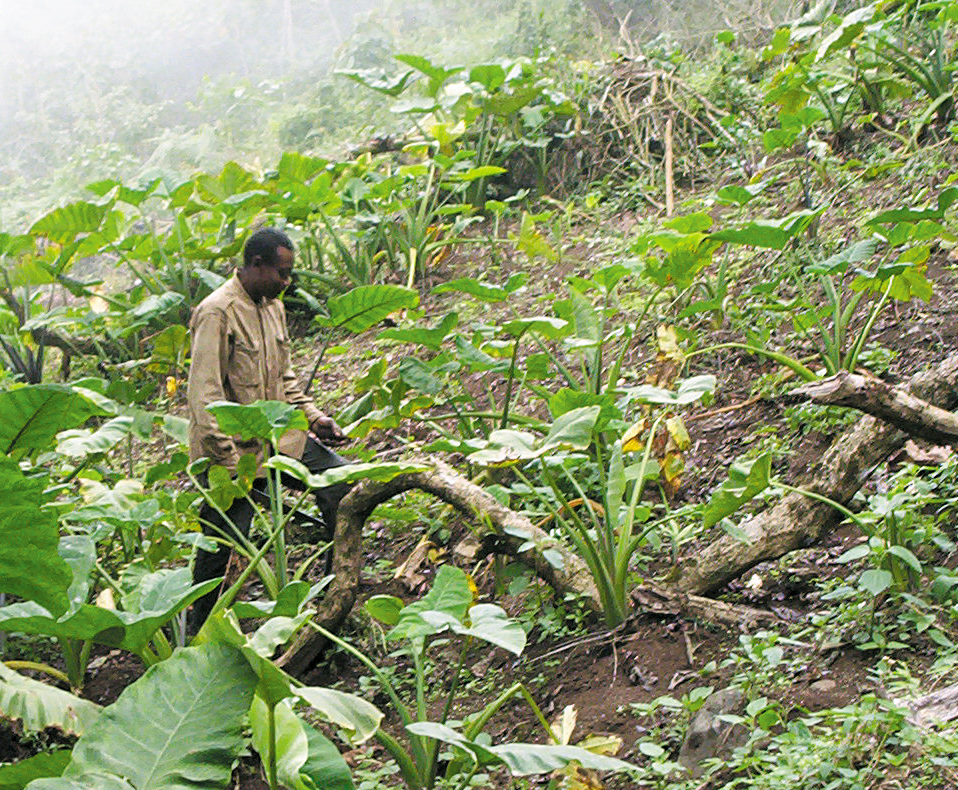
Farmer in a cocoyam shamba at Mount Fako

Shamba (Swahili for 'plantation'; pl. Mashamba) is an agroforestry system practiced in East Africa, particularly Kenya. In these lands various crops are combined: bananas, beans, yams and corn, to which are added timber resources, beekeeping, medicinal herbs, mushrooms, forest fruits, fodder for livestock, etc. Thanks to this polyculture, farmers obtain a higher share of income, food and employment. Furthermore, it is more sustainable and generates a smaller ecological footprint than monocultures.

The system was created in Kenya in the mid-19th century to extend land cultivation and meet the demand for firewood. A 2009 study estimated that in Kenya, where the state owns these plantations, there are some 160,000 hectares of shambas. However, the management of the shambas has been tainted by corruption, which Kenyan farmers' associations have denounced on many occasions. Large wooded areas were allowed to be converted to farmland. Moreover, the introduction of non-native species such as eucalyptus or cypress has been a problem. Wangari Maathai called for "not sacrificing native forests at the expense of exotic plantations".

== See also ==
- Kuojtakiloyan, agroforestry system in Mexico
- Dehesa, agroforestry system in Iberia
- Taungya, agroforestry system in Myanmar
