= David Sambar =

British American Lebanese banker and financial advisor (1930-2018)

David H. Sambar
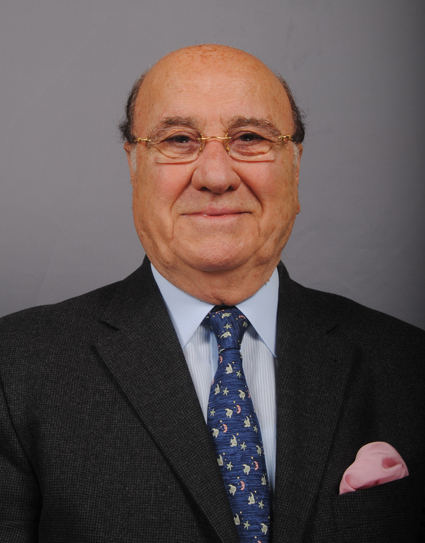
- Born: August 19, 1930; Haifa, Israel.
- Died: May 7, 2018 (aged 87); London, United Kingdom
- Education: Universite de Lyon
- Occupations: Investment banker, financial advisor and investor
- Spouse: Salma Zakka
- Children: 2

David H. Sambar (1930-2018) was a British American Lebanese international investment banker, financial advisor and investor. He was a senior executive at Chase Manhattan Bank from 1965 to 1977. Later he was Senior Advisor at UniCredit Banking Group A.G. London and sat on the Board of Directors of several institutions like QIB-UK (alias European Finance House); CAT Holding Luxembourg (Contracting & Trading)s.

== Early life and education ==
Dr. Sambar was born in Haifa, Israel. His father was Consul General for Lebanon at the time. The family moved to Lebanon in 1948 on account of the Jewish-Arab hostilities.

He was educated at British, American and French Schools and Universities; and held a doctorate “cum laude” from Universite de Lyon, France – School of Law, Economics & Business. He was Tri-lingual: Fluent in English, French, Arabic and conversational in Spanish, Portuguese and Italian. Sambar lived in Beirut, Paris, London, Geneva and New York.

== Career ==
Dr. Sambar’s early professional career was in the oil industry (Bechtel/Tapline/Aramco) and soon moved into a financial career with Chase Manhattan Bank, New York (1955). At Chase Manhattan Bank he held various positions in different financial centres, namely, Beirut, Paris, Geneva, London and New York. The last positions were Vice President for The Middle East and North Africa in New York and Executive Director of CML (Chase’s Merchant Bank in London). Sambar parted with Chase (1977) to take over as head of international operations for the Sharjah Group—a large investment pool owned predominantly by Gulf Ruling/ Royal family members and a substantial number of individual & institutional investors from the Persian Gulf.

His professional life developed into concentrating less on day to day in favour of Board level appointments. He was soon appointed Honorary Chairman of Banque de la Mediterranee, Paris (1983 to 86) and Executive Chairman of Mediterranee Investors Group Luxembourg & UK. Non Exec Chairman of British American Properties. In the same vein he was invited to Kroll Security Group UK as Senior Consultant.

Dr Sambar had non-profit involvements in his capacity as Fellow of The Institute of Directors, UK; Associate of The Security & Defense Forum; Women's World Banking; Freeman of the City of London as well as Trustee & Counselor of a number of international institutions.

In September 2014, Dr Sambar was appointed Senior Advisor to the Executive Board of STOXX, wholly owned by Deutsche Börse and SMI (Swiss Stock Exchange).

Dr. Sambar was also active on the lecture circuit, frequently delivering papers on financial subjects in front of such bodies as the Council on Foreign Relations, the Stanford Research Institute, and the U.S.-Arab Chamber of Commerce. He was a trustee of the Center for International Business, in Dallas, Texas

== Other ==
He was interviewed, profiled and quoted in: Washington Report on Middle East Affairs., Forbes, The Wall Street Journal, International Herald Tribune, Houston Chronicle, Euromoney and Business International Corporation.

== Death ==
He died on May 7, 2018, in London of colon cancer at the age of 87. He was survived by his wife Salma Zakka, and his two children, Syma and Habib, both of whom resided in the United States. He was also survived by two brothers and two sisters.
