= Balaji Kunjar =

Baloji Kunjar / Kunjir (17??–1816) was Sardar and Minister of Affairs in service of Peshwa Baji Rao II. He was Peshwa Baji Rao II's favorite. After the death of Peshwa Sawai Madhavrao, there was debates for the position of Peshwa among the Maratha Empire. Balaji Kunjar performed a successful role to convey most friendly declaration and assurance between Baji Rao II and Nana Phadanvis, to appoint Baji Rao II as peshwa of Maratha Empire. Peshwa Baji Rao II and Nana Phadanvis awarded inam (Jagir) to him in 14 villages near Purandhar fort, for his role. He performed successful role in administration of maratha empire and as affairs minister or diplomat (vakil) for Peshwa Baji Rao II. He along with his son Pandoji Kunjar and Narayan, enjoyed the position as Sur-Patil (सर-पाटील) at Pune Punch Mahals during the era of Peshawa Baji Rao II. He along with his family has long enjoyed the privileges of sar-patil of 360 villages and towns in the Subha of Poona.

== Career ==
Rise of Balaji Kunjar (Kunjir)

(from A.D. 1795–1796)

In the service of Nana Purandare, there was a shiledar, the natural son of the Patil of the village "Waghapur", near Purandhar Fort. Nana Purandare appointed him to collect the revenue of "Khandesh", who had contrived to attract the notice of Baji Rao II, when he was taken from confinement at Shivneri, and who was afterwards permitted by Nana Purandare to enter in the service of Peshwa Baji Rao II. Balaji Kunjar, for such was the name of the shiledar, perceiving the situation of the affairs, although he had little opportunity of consulting his master, visited Nana Phadanvis at Mahad, and conveyed the most friendly declaration and assurances on the part of Baji Rao II, begging of Nana to exert himself in their mutual behalf.

Vitthojirao Holkar declared that he was working for Amrutrao, who was more capable of being the Peshwa than Bajirao (II). Bajirao (II) sent Balaji Kunjir and Bapu Gokhale to arrest Vitthojirao Holkar, and in April, 1801, Vitthojirao was arrested and taken to Pune. He was sentenced to death under the feet of an elephant. His wife and son Harirao were imprisoned. The well-wishers of the Maratha Confederacy warned the Peshwa not to take such a drastic step, as it would lead to the collapse of the Maratha Confederacy; but Bajirao (II) Peshwa ignored it. When Maharaja Yashwantrao Holkar learned this, he vowed to take revenge.

In May 1802, Maharaja Yashwantrao Holkar marched towards Pune to solve the disputes. He conquered Sendhwa, Chalisgaon, Dhulia, Malegaon, Parol, Ner, Ahmednagar, Rahuri, Nasik, Sinner, Dungargaon, Jamgaon, Pharabagh, Gardond, Pandharpur, Kurkumb, Narayangaon, Baramati, Purandhar, Saswad, Moreshwar, Thalner, and Jejuri.

On Sunday, 25 October 1802, on the festival of Diwali, Yashwantrao Holkar defeated the combined armies of Scindia and Peshwa at Hadapsar, near Pune. The battles took place at Ghorpadi, Banwadi and Hadapsar. Maharaja Yashwantrao Holkar had ordered his army not to attack first and wait until 25 cannonballs were fired from other side; when the 25 cannonballs were fired, Maharaja Yashwantrao Holkar ordered his army to attack. As soon as he had won the war, he ordered his army not to harm the civilians of Pune. The Peshwa, when he learned that he was defeated, fled from Pune via Parvati, Wadgaon to Sinhgad. Maharaja Yashwantrao Holkar asked the Peshwa to return to Pune. If Maharaja Yashwantrao Holkar had decided to arrest the Peshwa, he could have done so; but instead he sent food to the Peshwa so that he did not have to suffer.

On 27 October 1802, Peshwa Bajirao (II), along with Chimnaji, Baloji Kunjir and with some soldiers of Scindia, went to Raigad and spent one month in Virwadi. He then went to Suwarnadurgh, and on 1 December 1802, went to Bassein via a ship named Harkuyan. The British offered him enticements to sign the Subsidiary Treaty in return for the throne. After deliberating for over a month, and after threats that his brother would otherwise be recognized as Peshwa, Bajirao (II) signed the treaty, surrendering his residual sovereignty and allowing the English to put him on the throne at Poona. This Treaty of Bassein was signed on 31 December 1802.

After signing the treaty with the British, Baji Rao II concluded that he was Peshwa only in name. Then he tried to raise an army in a hidden way to fight against British. He gave support and funds to Baloji Kunjir to raise army. Balaji Kunjir, with the help of Trimbakji, tried to train forces at the Bay of Nira River. The British became suspicious about these movements, and sent their forces to observe the condition at Nira. The British gave warnings to Peshwa to stop his activity against the British.

Balaji Kunjar went Gwalior to Shindia's Durbar as an agent of Peshwa Baji Rao II, for many years.

Balaji Kunjar seems to have been an honest man and had the welfare of the Maratha Empire at heart. He did not, and would not, play into the hands of the British, who were then giving effect to the maxims laid down by Machiavelli and corrupting the Peshwa's ministers. He also tried to mediate between Scindia and Holkar, to build up a united front among the Maratha chiefs.

Balaji Kunjar fought against the British after the destruction of the Maratha Empire, with Pindaris and Trimbkaji Dengle.

He died at Pundharpur in 1816.

== See also ==
- Battle of Poona
- Yashwantrao Holkar
