= Crystal Castle and Shambhala Gardens =

Tourist attraction in northern New South Wales, Australia

- Location within New South Wales
- Type: Botanical garden
- Location: 81 Monet Drive, Montecollum, New South Wales, 2482 Australia
- Nearest city: Lismore
- Coordinates: 28°35′29″S 153°27′33″E
- Area: 10 ha (25 acres)
- Created: 1986
- Designer: Edwin Kingsbury (architect); Naren King; Sono King (Shambhala Gardens); Dave Rawlins (rainforest walk); Mandy Lisson (rainforest walk); Alok Eggenberger (Stupa architect)
- Owner: Naren King
- Visitors: 90,000 (in 2022)
- Status: Open all year
- Facilities: Botanical gardens; Geodesic sound dome; Labyrinths; Rainforest walk; Buddhist Stupa; Tibetan prayer wheels; Buddha and Hindu statues; Crystal Geodes; Fossils; Cafe; Playground; Ponds and water features
- Website: https://crystalcastle.com.au/

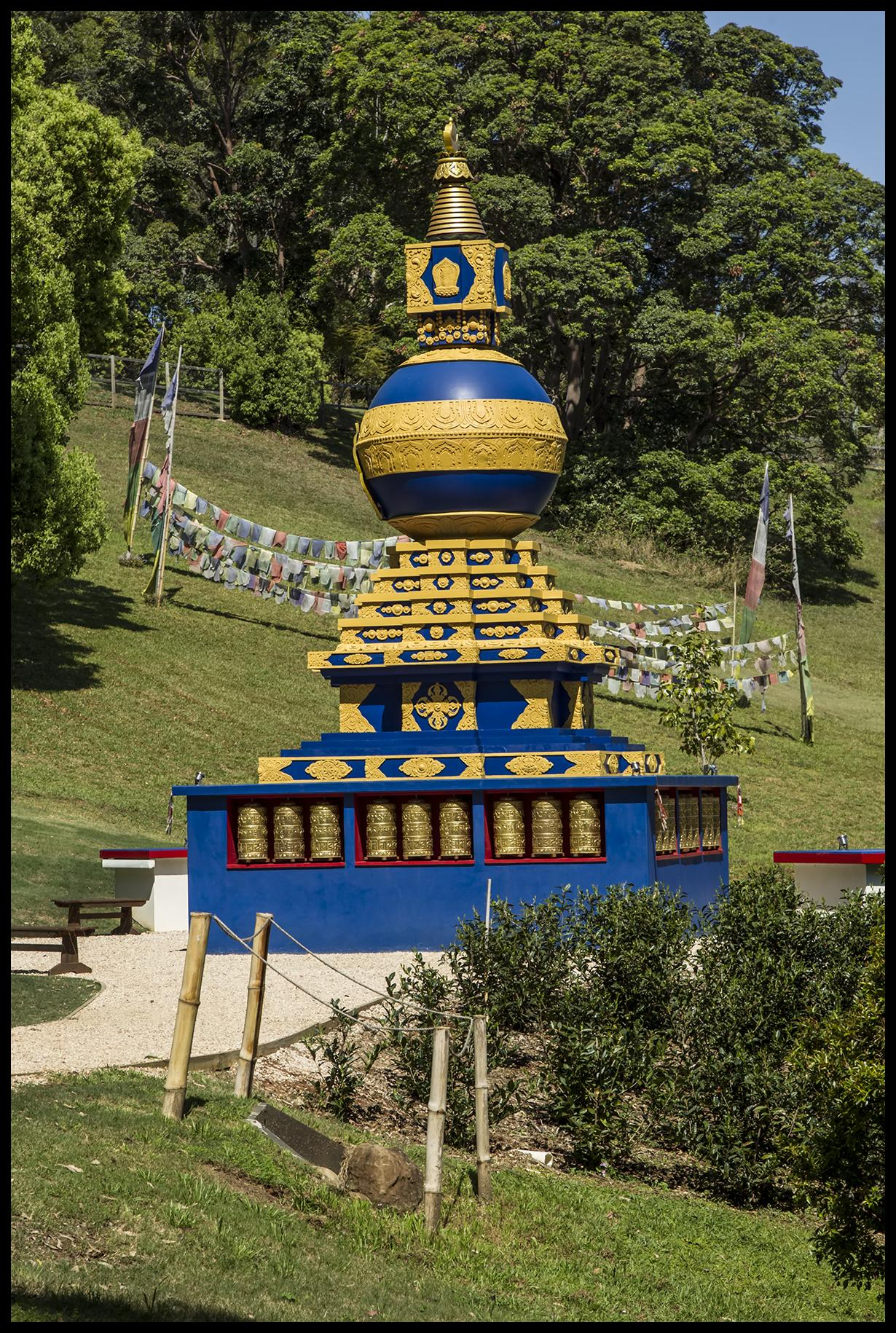
Kalachakra Stupa at Crystal Castle

Crystal Castle and Shambhala Gardens is a botanical garden in the Byron Bay hinterland set on 25 acres. On display are a number of the world's largest geodes and the only Kalachakra stupa in the southern hemisphere. The garden receives almost 100,000 visitors a year and is a key tourist attraction in the Northern Rivers region. The gardens are routinely listed in Australian newspapers as a must-do when visiting the Byron Bay region and was even specifically mentioned in the New York Times 52 Places to Go in 2019 list.

It is located on the lands of the Arakwal and Widjabul Wia-bal people of the Bundjalung nation.

== History ==
Key Events:

- 1980 – Primary building erected, the architect was Edwin Kingsbury, for owner Mal Cooper
- 1985 – Naren King visits the property for the first time
- 1986 – Naren & Dhira King purchase the property, consisting of 25 acres of land with an existing building. They name it 'Crystal Castle'.
- 1999 – Design plans for Shambhala Garden begin
- 2000 – Sacred labyrinth
- 2003 – Playground installed
- 2005 – Buddha Walk
- 2006 – Rainforest Walk in collaboration with Rainforest Rescue
- 2008 – Fountain of Peace
- 2012 – World Peace Kalachakra Stupa built. Site renamed 'Crystal Castle and the Shambhala Gardens.'
- 2013 – Sera Mey monks created a sand mandala of compassion. The dissolution was held on 15 December.
- 2014
  - Day of the Dead event.
  - Forest & Friends established.
  - Reflexology Walk.
- 2015
  - hosted Rebuild Nepal Benefit concert with Toni Childs.
  - Damanhur Spiral
  - 'Green Frog shuttle' bus service begins ferrying passengers between key local tourist attractions and locations, including Crystal Castle and Shambhala Gardens.
- 2016
  - Enchanted Cave and Crystal Guardians purchased
  - 30th birthday week celebrations
  - a second benefit with Toni Childs, was organised but due to weather, it was moved to the Mullumbimby Civic Hall.

== Geography ==
The gardens are located on 25 acres of sloping land in the Byron Bay hinterland. The climate is sub-tropical with a high average rainfall. The soils are fertile volcanic red loam.

=== Flora ===
The gardens host a wide variety of tropical and sub-tropical species. Since 2006, over 7000 trees have been planted in collaboration with Rainforest Rescue.

Bodhi Tree – a Bodhi tree cutting was planted on the site and grows near the Stupa.

=== Fauna ===
Animals that may be seen in the gardens include the following:

- koalas
- emerald doves
- brown cuckoo-doves
- topknot pigeons
- white headed pigeons
- figbirds
- scaly-breasted lorikeets
- Lewin's honey eaters
- grey fantails
- satin bowerbirds
- regent bowerbirds
- rose crowned fruit doves
- echindas
- pademelons
- butterflies
- Laughing Kookaburras
- Green Tree Frogs
- Rainbow Lorikeets
- Swamp Wallabies
- Yellow-Tailed Black Cockatoos
- Tawny frogmouths

=== Geology ===
Within the gardens are an array of imported crystals, fossils, geodes and other geological exhibits, including:

- Amethyst
- Sodalite
- Rose quartz
- Smoky quartz
- Orthoceras fossils

== Features ==
=== The Castle ===
The original 400 square metre residence took over 18 months to build and the architect, Edwin Kingsbury, has stated he was influenced by Mediaeval English castles, Egyptian Sphinx and Pyramids, and eels. The building is a brick and timber structure. Timbers used include local rosewood, Cairns silky oak, and imported Brazilian cedar. There are at least 14 rooms including: cellar, billiard room, ensuite with bidet, and double garage. With architectural features including: towers, courtyards, terraces and an avoidance of right-angles

=== Attractions ===
- Shambhala Gardens – botanical gardens
- Crystal Labyrinth
- Dragon Egg – 10 tonne amethyst geode you can sit inside
- Crystal Guardians – two 5.5 metre Amethyst geodes
- Enchanted cave – A 20 million-year-old amethyst geode from Artigas, Uruguay, that is 18 feet (5.5m) wide and weighs 44,000 lbs (20,000 kg).
- Fountain of Peace – a 310 kg rotating rose quartz sphere suspended in a water fountain
- Wings to Eternity – several pairs amethyst geodes in the shape of fairy, or angel, wings
- World Peace Stupa – The first Kalachakra Stupa to be constructed in the Southern Hemisphere
- Giant treasure chest – a 7 tonne composite geode
- Buddha Walk – the walk travels past several large statues
  - Buddha – Initially intended for a Sumatran temple, the Buddha was found to have a flaw and rejected by the temple. In 2006, it was the largest stone Buddha to be imported into Australia. It stands 4 metres high, and weighs 14 tonne.
- Rainforest Walk
- Love Garden – a private alcove with a jasper seat and two heart-shaped amethyst crystals
- Reflexology Path – a cobblestone path surrounding a 4 tonne rose quartz
- Damanhur Spiral – a crystal labyrinth
- Fossil Garden
- Peace Dome – 15 metre geodesic sound dome where you can experience the acoustic phenomenon of a 'whispering wall.'
- Bodhi Tree
- Lotus Cafe – vegetarian cafe

=== Experiences ===
- Crystal meditation
- Crystal sound healing
- Guided Tours
- Self-guided tours – a self-guided tour, with the aid of a 16-page booklet containing details of the park's flora, with various tree species identified throughout the park.
- Aura Photography

== Access ==
Tickets can be pre-purchased online, or purchased at the entrance when you arrive. Accessible pathways, ramps, and bathroom facilities are available. Complimentary rainbow-coloured umbrellas are available to use onsite. Unlimited entry annual passes, and family packages, are available. As at 27 December 2024, tickets cost: $44.95 AUD(adults), $34.95 AUD (child), $44.95 AUD (concession). The gardens are closed Good Friday, Christmas Day and Boxing Day.

== Awards ==
- 2002 Best Regional Tourist Attraction, Northern Rivers Tourism Award
- 2003 Best Regional Tourist Attraction, Northern Rivers Tourism Award
- 2004 Best Regional Tourist Attraction, Northern Rivers Tourism Award
- 2004 Best Regional Tourist Attraction, Northern Rivers Tourism Award
- 2005 Best Regional Tourist Attraction, Northern Rivers Tourism Award
- 2005 Finalist, NSW State Tourism Awards
- 2025 Silver, Tourist Attractions category, NSW State Tourism Awards
