= Kalachakra =

Nondualistic tantra tradition in Tibetan Buddhism

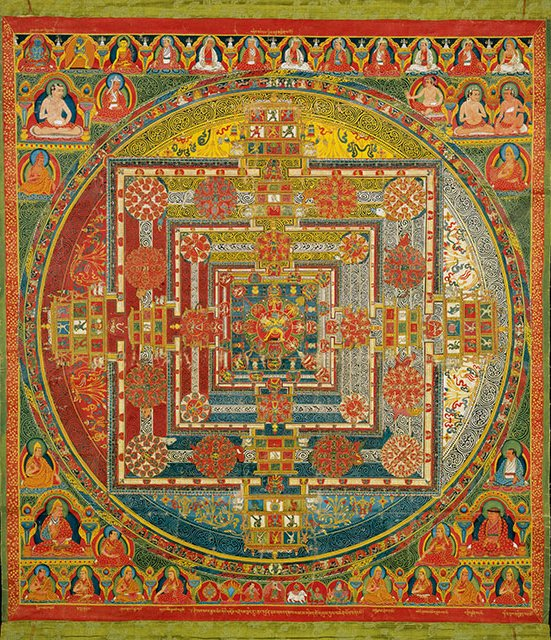
A Kālacakra Mandala with the deities Kalachakra and Vishvamata

Kālacakra (Tibetan: དུས་ཀྱི་འཁོར་ལོ།, Wylie: dus kyi 'khor lo) is a polysemic term in Vajrayana Buddhism and Hinduism that means "wheel of time" or "time cycles". "Kālacakra" is also the name of a series of Buddhist texts and a major practice lineage in Indian Buddhism and Tibetan Buddhism. The tantra is considered to belong to the unexcelled yoga (anuttara-yoga) class.

Kālacakra also refers both to a patron tantric deity or yidam in Vajrayana and to the philosophies and yogas of the Kālacakra tradition. The tradition's origins are in India and its most active later history and presence has been in Tibet. The tradition contains teachings on cosmology, theology, philosophy, sociology, soteriology, myth, prophecy, medicine, and yoga. It depicts a mythic reality whereby cosmic and socio-historical events correspond to processes in the bodies of individuals. These teachings are meant to lead to a transformation of one's body and mind into perfect Buddhahood through various yogic methods.

The Kālacakra tradition is based on Mahayana Buddhist non-dualism, which is strongly influenced by Madhyamaka philosophy, but also draws on a wide range of Buddhist and non-Buddhist (mainly Hindu) traditions (such as Vaibhāṣika, Kashmir Shaivism, Vaishnavism, and Samkhya). The Kālacakra tradition holds that Kālacakra teachings were taught in India by Gautama Buddha himself. According to modern Buddhist studies, the original Sanskrit texts of the Kālacakra tradition "originated during the early decades of the 11th century CE, and we know with certainty that the Śrī Kālacakra and the Vimalaprabhā commentary were completed between 1025 and 1040 CE." Kālacakra remains an active tradition of Buddhist tantra in Tibetan Buddhism, being particularly emphasized by the Jonang tradition, and its teachings and initiations have been offered to large public audiences, most famously by the 14th Dalai Lama, Tenzin Gyatso.

== Sources ==
The Kālacakra Tantra is more properly called the Laghu-kālacakratantra-rāja (Sovereign Abridged Kālacakra) and is said to be an abridged form of an original text, the Paramādibuddhatantra of the Shambala king Sucandra, which is no longer extant. The author of the abridged tantra is said to have been the Shambala king Manjushriyasas. According to Vesna Wallace, the Vimalaprabhā (Stainless Light) of Pundarika is "the most authoritative commentary on the Kālacakratantra and served as the basis for all subsequent commentarial literature of that literary corpus."

=== Sanskrit texts ===
The Sanskrit text of the Kālacakratantra was first published by Raghu Vira and Lokesh Chandra in 1966, with a Mongolian text in volume 2. This 1966 edition was based on manuscripts from the British Library and the Bir Library, Kathmandu. A critical edition of the original Sanskrit text of the Kālacakratantra was published by Biswanath Banerjee in 1985 based on manuscripts from Cambridge, London and Patna.

A further planned volume by Banerjee containing the Vimalaprabhā appears not to have been published. The Sanskrit texts of the Kālacakratantra and the Vimalaprabhā commentary were published on the basis of newly discovered manuscripts from Nepal (5) and India (1) by Jagannatha Upadhyaya (with Vrajavallabh Dwivedi and S. S. Bahulkar, 3 vols., 1986–1994). In 2010, Lokesh Chandra published a facsimile of one of the manuscripts that was not used by Jagannatha Upadhyaya et al. in their edition.

=== Tibetan translations ===
The Tibetan translation of the commentary Vimalaprabhā is usually studied from the 1733 Derge Kangyur edition of the Tibetan canon, vol. 40, text no. 1347. This was published by Dharma Publishing, Berkeley, US, in 1981.

David Reigle noted, in a discussion in the INDOLOGY forum of 11 April 2020, that, "the Tibetan translation of the Kālacakra-tantra made by Somanātha and 'Bro lotsawa as revised by Shong ston is found in the Lithang, Narthang, Der-ge, Co-ne, Urga, and Lhasa blockprint recensions of the Kangyur, and also in a recension with annotations by Bu ston. This Shong revision was then further revised by the two Jonang translators Blo gros rgyal mtshan and Blo gros dpal bzang po. The Jonang revision is found in the Yunglo and Peking blockprint recensions of the Kangyur, and also in a recension with annotations by Phyogs las rnam rgyal."

=== Chapters ===
The Kālacakratantra is divided into five chapters. The content of the five chapters is as follows:

- The first chapter deals with what is called the "outer Kālacakra" (the world system, loka-dhatu), which provides a cosmology based on Vaibhasika Abhidharma, Samkhya, the Puranas and Jain cosmology. The Kālacakra calendar, the birth and death of universes, the Solar System and the workings of the elements are expounded. The myth and prophecy of the kingdom of Shambhala is also discussed.
- The second chapter deals with "inner Kālacakra," which concerns human gestation and birth, the functions within the human body, and the subtle body aspects, mainly the channels, winds, drops and so forth. The potentials (drops, bindus) which give rise to these states are described, together with the processes that flow from them.
- The third chapter deals with the requirements and preparation for meditation, mainly, the initiations (abhiseka) of Kālacakra.
- The fourth chapter explains the sadhana and yoga (spiritual practices), both the meditation on the mandala and its deities in the generation stage, and the perfection stage practices of the "six yogas".
- The fifth chapter describes the state of gnosis (jñāna), which is the result or fruit of the practice.

== History ==
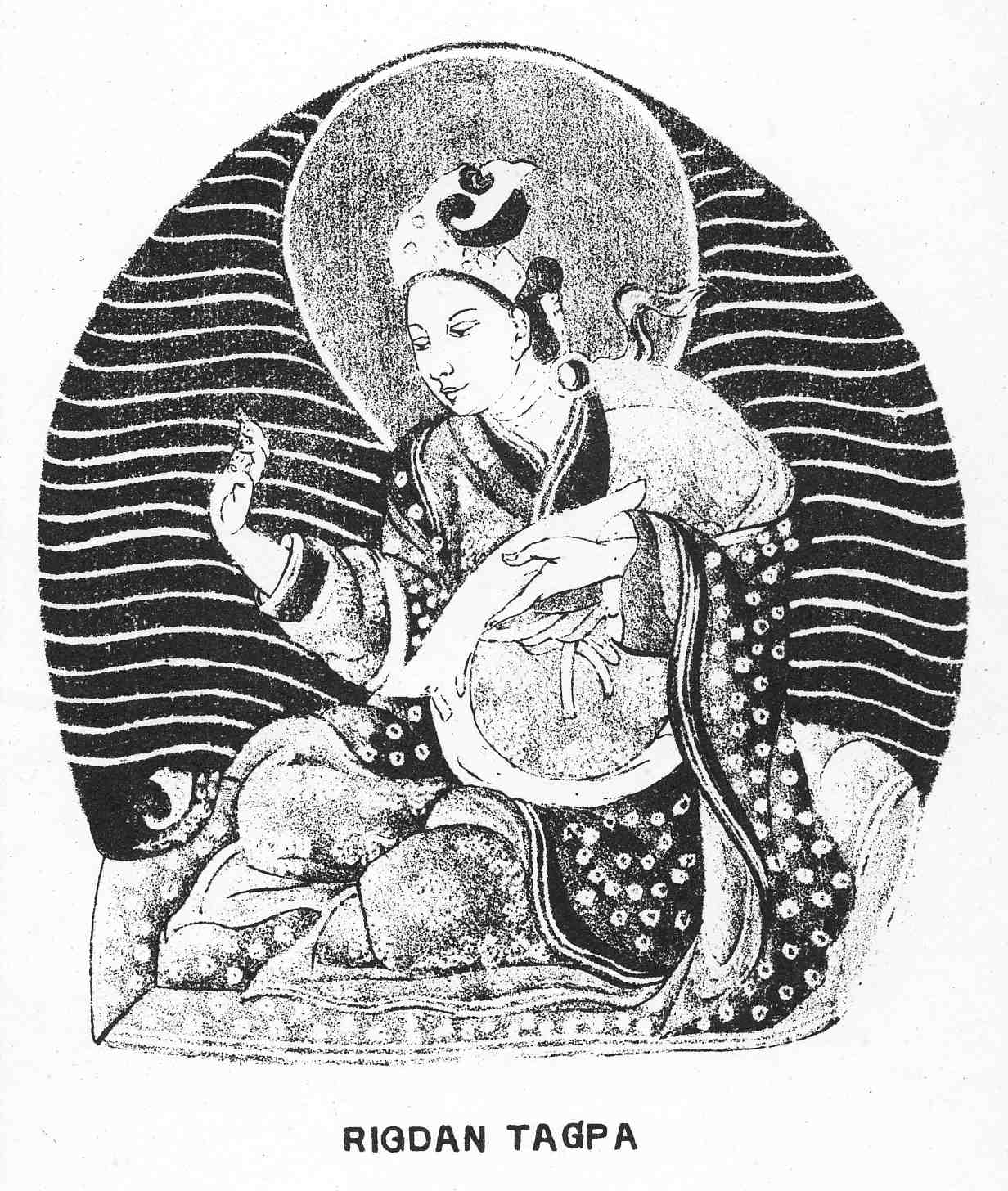
Mañjushrīkīrti (Tibetan: འཇམ་དཔལ་གྲགས་པ, THL Jampel Drakpa), King of Shambhala

=== Origins ===
According to the Kālacakra tradition, Sakyamuni Buddha manifested as the Kālachakra deities and taught the Kālachakra root tantra at a stupa in Dharanikota (near modern Amaravathi, Andhra Pradesh). He did this while supposedly bilocating (appearing in two places at once) at the same time as he was also delivering the Prajñāpāramitā sutras at Griddhraj Parvat in Bihar.

Along with King Suchandra, ninety-six minor kings and emissaries from Shambhala were also said to have received the teachings. The Kālacakra thus passed directly to the kingdom of Shambhala, where it was held exclusively for hundreds of years. Later Kings of Shambhala, Mañjushrīkīrti and Pundarika, are said to have condensed and simplified the teachings into the Śri Kālacakra or Laghutantra and its main commentary, the Vimalaprabha, which remain extant today as the heart of the Kālacakra literature. Fragments of the original tantra have survived; the most significant fragment, the Sekkodesha, was commented upon by Naropa.

Mañjuśrīkīrti is said to have been born in 159 BCE and ruled over Shambhala and 100,000 cities. In his domain lived 300,510 mleccha barbarians with heretical beliefs in Nimai sinta (sun). He expelled all these heretics from his dominions but they accepted Buddhism and pleaded that they be allowed to return. He accepted their petitions and taught them the Kālacakra teachings. In 59 BCE he abdicated his throne to his son, Puṇḍārika, and died soon afterwards, entering the saṃbhogakāya of Buddhahood.

There are currently two main textual traditions of Kālacakra in Tibetan-Buddhism, the Ra lineage (Wylie: rva lugs) of Ra Lotsawa and the Dro lineage (Wylie: bro lugs) of Drolo Sherap Drak. In both traditions, the Kālacakratantra and its related commentaries were returned to India in 966 CE by an Indian pandit. In the Ra tradition this figure is known as Chilupa, and in the Dro tradition as Kālacakrapada the Greater. Chilupa is said to have set out to receive the Kālacakra teachings in Shambhala, along the journey to which he encountered a manifestation of Mañjuśrī, who gave him the Kālacakra initiation. He then disseminated the Kālacakra teachings in India.

According to Vesna Wallace, the propagation of the Kālacakra teachings in India date to the 11th century.

=== Spread to Tibet ===
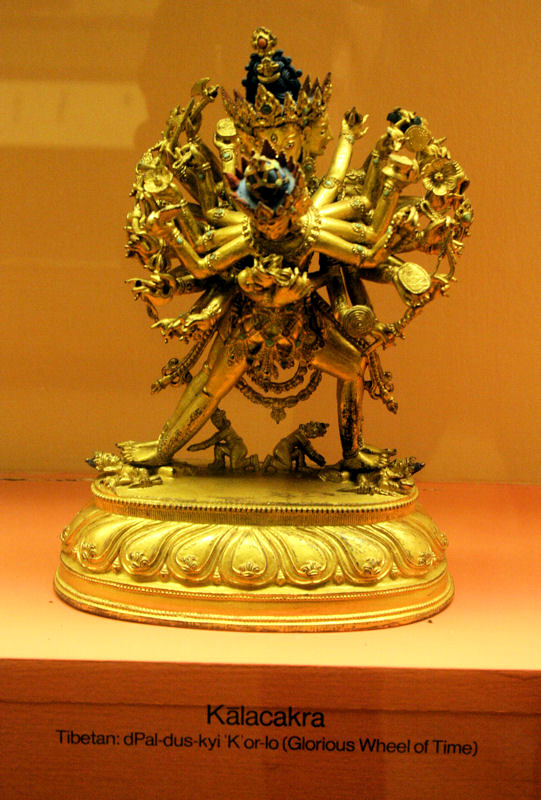
Kālacakra statue in American Museum of Natural History, New York City

According to Tāranātha, seventeen distinct lineages of Kālacakra that came from India to Tibet were recorded and compiled by the Jonang master, Kunpang Chenpo. The main two lineages of these that are practised today are the Dro lineage and the Ra lineage, both lineages were founded by disciples of an Indian master named Nalandapa.

The Ra lineage became particularly important in the Sakya school of Tibetan Buddhism, where it was held by such prominent masters as Sakya Pandita (1182–1251), Drogön Chögyal Phagpa (1235–1280), Butön Rinchen Drup (1290–1364), and Dölpopa Shérap Gyeltsen (1292–1361). The latter two, both of whom also held the Dro lineage, are particularly well known expositors of the Kālacakra in Tibet, the practice of which is said to have greatly informed Dölpopa's exposition of shentong philosophy. A strong emphasis on Kālacakra practice and exposition of the shentong view were the principal distinguishing characteristics of the Jonang school that traces its roots to Dölpopa.

Today, Kālacakra is practiced by all schools of Tibetan Buddhism, although it is most prominent in Gelug and Jonang. It is the main tantric practice for the Jonangpa, whose school persists to this day with a small number of monasteries in Kham, Qinghai and Sichuan.

== Views ==
The philosophical view of the Kālacakratantra is undoubtedly that of the Mahayana Buddhist Madhyamaka school, and the text attempts to refute all other Buddhist and non-Buddhist systems. As noted by Wallace, the Kālacakratantra holds that "only Madhyamikas who assert the nonduality of compassion and emptiness avoid philosophical failure."

The Kālacakratantra summarizes its fundamental doctrines in the following passage:

Identitylessness, the maturation of karma, the three realms, the six states of existence, the origination due to the twelve-limbed dependence, the Four Truths, the eighteen unique qualities of the Buddha, the five psycho-physical aggregates, the three bodies and the Sahajakaya, and animate emptiness. The system in which these are taught is the clear and definite instruction of the Vajri.

=== Transformation of body and mind ===
According to Vesna Wallace, the Kālacakra tradition has a unique interpretation of emptiness which is not just a mere negation of inherent existence (svabhava), but also refers to "the absence of material constituents of the individual's body and mind." This "aspect of emptiness" (sunyatakara), or "form of emptiness" (sunyata-bimba), is, according to Wallace:

a form that is empty of both inherent existence and physical particles. It is a form that is endowed with all the signs and symbols of the Buddha. That form of emptiness, also known as the "empty form," is also regarded as the "animate emptiness" (ajada-sunyata). Due to being animate, this emptiness is the cause of supreme and immutable bliss (paramacala-sukha). The non-duality of the cause and effect is the essential teaching of this tantra.

The unique Kālacakra path and goal is based on this view. Its goal is:

the transformation of one's own gross physical body into a luminous form devoid of both gross matter and the subtle body of pranas. The transformation of one's own mind into the enlightened mind of immutable bliss occurs in direct dependence upon that material transformation. The actualization of that transformation is believed to be perfect and full Buddhahood in the form of Kālacakra, the Supreme Primordial Buddha (paramadi-buddha), who is the omniscient, innate Lord of the Jinas, the true nature of one's own mind and body.

The supreme imperishable bliss is also defined as peace (santa), and pervades the bodies of sentient beings and the entire world. For beings who are in samsara, this blissful Buddha-mind also manifests as sexual bliss, during which the mind becomes free of concepts and non-dual for a brief moment. Thus, the Kālacakra tradition stresses the importance of not avoiding sexual bliss, but using it on the path, since it is a kind of facsimile of the realization of emptiness and it produces mental joy. It also stresses the importance of retaining one's semen during sexual union, as well as the importance of proper motivation and not-grasping at blissful states.

The goal of Kālacakra is also described as access to gnosis or knowledge (jñana, also called vajra-yoga, prajñaparamita, vidya "spiritual knowledge" and Mahamudra) which is defined as "the mind of immutable bliss," and the union of wisdom and method, or emptiness and compassion. Jñana is also the mind free of causal relations (niranvaya) and empty of inherent existence. The Adibuddhatantra (i.e. the root Kālacakratantra) describes jñana as follows:

It has passed beyond [the designations:] "It exists" and "It does not exist." It is the cessation of existence and non-existence. It is nondual. It is the vajra-yoga that is non-differentiated from emptiness and compassion. It is the supreme bliss. It has transcended the reality of atoms. It is devoid of empty dharmas. It is free of eternity and annihilation. It is the vajra yoga that is without causal relations.

Jñana is a pure radiant mind, devoid of any impurities of habitual tendencies (vasana). It has no form and is devoid of atomic particles and is beyond subject and object. It is free of conceptualizations, and is a self-aware (svasamvedana) natural luminosity which is partless and all-pervasive. Jñana is Buddhahood, the ultimate reality or thusness (tathata). It is the Dharmadhatu, which is the primordially unoriginated beginning (adi) or atemporal source (yoni) of all phenomena. Jñana is also beyond all classifications and transcends samsara and nirvana (though it appears/manifests as both). Since it is non-dual with emptiness, it is empty of inherent existence.

Jñana also manifests as bodies, including the four bodies of the Buddha (the Sahajakaya, Dharmakaya, Sambhogakaya, and Nirmanakaya) and the bodies of sentient beings (each one of which are said to contain the four Buddha bodies in unmanifest forms). According to the Kālacakratantra, enlightened awareness is innately present in an ordinary individual's body:

Just as space does not disappear [from a jar] when water is poured into the jar, in the same way, the sky-vajri, who is the pervader of the universe and devoid of sense-objects, is within the body.

However, even though all beings have this enlightened awareness, it is not actualized if one does not ascertain it and this entails the absence of mental afflictions or impurities which block recognition of enlightened awareness. These mental afflictions are also closely connected to the pranas or vital winds (which are said to cause and sustain the afflictions) and thus to an individual's psycho-physical constitution. Thus, awakening comes about through the purification of the pranas.

=== Cosmology ===
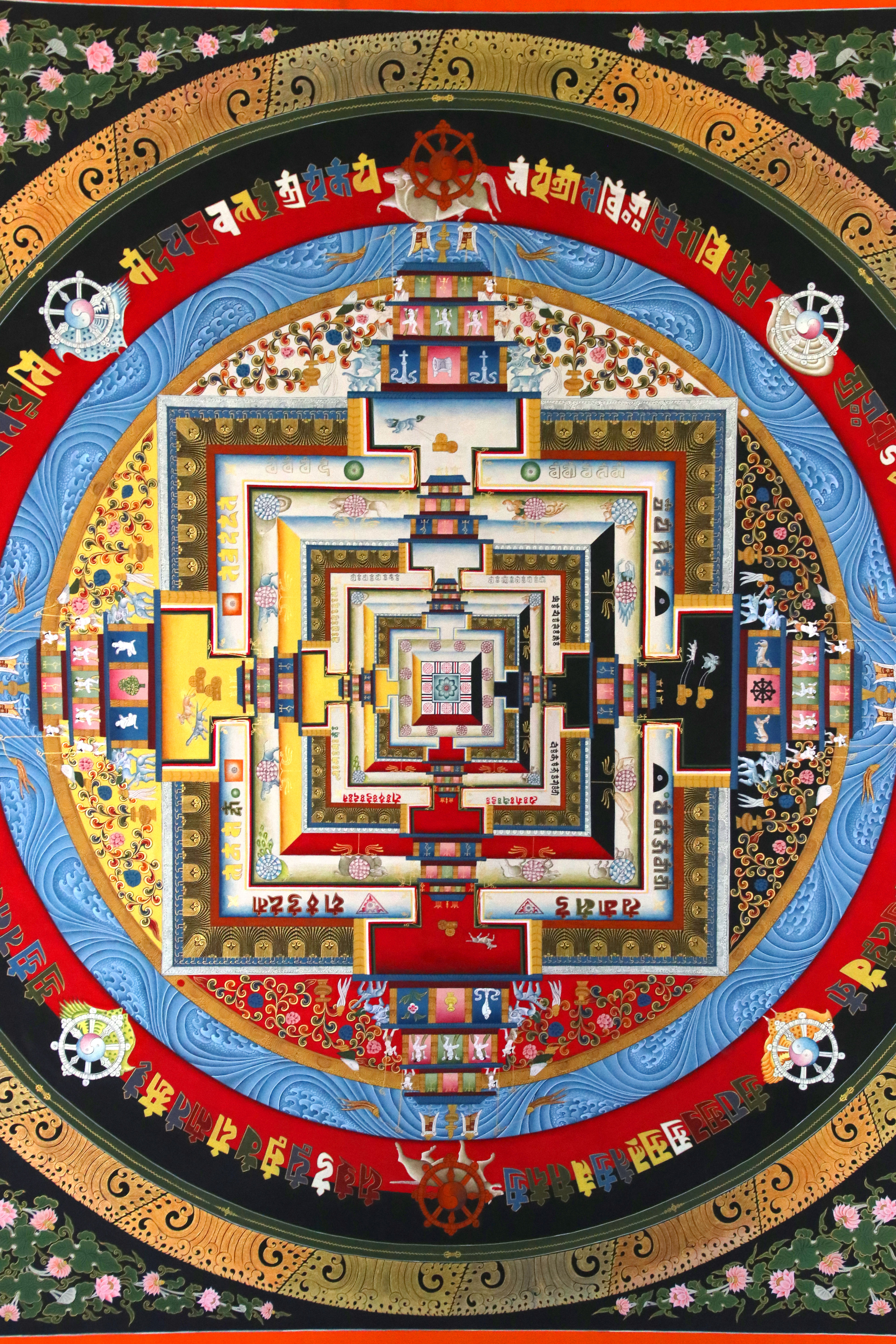
The Kālacakra Mandala depicts the teachings of the tantra in visual symbolic form.

In the Kālacakratantra's cosmology, samsara (cyclic existence) is made up of innumerable Buddha fields and of the five elements or properties (characterized by origination, duration and destruction). The whole cosmos arises due to the collective karma of sentient beings, which produces vital winds (vayu) that mold and dissolve the atomic particles that make up the various inanimate things of the world and the bodies of sentient beings.

A key element of the Kālacakratantra is the correspondence between macrocosmic processes and microcosmic processes. The Kālacakratantra maps the various features and developmental processes of the world system to various features of the human body. The phrase "as it is outside, so it is within the body" (yatha bahye tatha dehe) is often found in the Kālacakratantra to emphasize the similarities and correspondence between human beings (inner Kālacakra) and the cosmos (outer Kālacakra), as well as with the enlightened Kālacakra mandala of deities (alternative Kālacakra). This correspondence comes about because both the cosmos and the bodies of sentient beings come into existence due to the efficacy of the habitual propensities of the minds of beings. In this sense, the cosmos is like a cosmic replica of a sentient being's body. Thus, one can say that the cosmos and the individual are nondual and mutually pervasive, even in terms of their conventional existence. They are interconnected and they influence each other.

The basic reason for this exposition is that a proper understanding of conventional reality provides a basis for understanding ultimate reality. Regarding ultimate reality, Wallace further notes,

In terms of ultimate reality, the cosmos and the individual are also of the same nature, the nature of gnosis (jñāna), which manifests in the form of emptiness (sunyata-bimba). Those who are free of the afflictive and cognitive obscurations nondually perceive the world as the form of emptiness in a nondual manner; that is, they perceive the world as an inseparable unity of form and emptiness. On the other hand, ordinary sentient beings, whose perception is influenced by the afflictive and cognitive obscurations, see the world in a dual fashion, as something other than themselves. They see the world as an ordinary place inhabited by ordinary sentient beings. But in reality, the entire cosmos, with Meru in its center, is a cosmic body of the Jina, a cosmic image or reflection (pratima) of the Buddha, having the nature of form. As such, it is similar to the Nirmanakaya of the Buddha. Therefore, according to this tantric system, one should attend to this cosmic image of the Buddha, as one attends to the statue of the Buddha, created for the sake of worship.

The tantra's section on cosmology also includes an exposition of Indian astrology. In Tibet, the Kālacakra text is also the basis of Tibetan astrological calendars.

Wallace also adds that this cosmological system based on the three Kālacakras is mainly seen by the Kālacakra literature "as a heuristic model for meditative purposes". According to Wallace, all the different paradigms outlined in the Kālacakratantra are contemplative models which "serve as devices for furthering one's understanding of the interconnectedness of all phenomena and for training the mind to perceive the world in a nondual fashion" and thus by using them one can "diminish the habitual propensities of an ordinary, dualistic mind."

This view of interconnectedness is also applied among all human beings and all sentient beings and contains methods to train the mind so as to perceive all sentient beings as nondual from oneself. According to Wallace, the Kālacakratantra states that "one should look at the triple world as similar to space and as unitary." The tantra also states that "all six states of transmigratory existence are already present within every individual," and this is related to the doctrine of the three gunas.

=== Time and cycles ===
The Kālacakratantra revolves around the concept of time (kāla) and cycles or wheels (chakra). Conventionally speaking, this refers to the cycles of the planets, to the cycles of human breathing and subtle energies in the body. Regarding the outer or external aspect of conventional reality, the wheel of time refers to the passage of days, month, and years (as well as the cycles of the zodiac) while with regard to the individual or inner aspect, it refers to "the circulation of pranas [vital airs] within the wheel of the nadis [subtle channels] in the body," which is linked with the 12 aspects of dependent origination and the 12 signs of the zodiac. These different cycles are interconnected and correspond to each other.

In the first chapter, it is stated that the world emerges from emptiness and the force of time, which is a kind of power that originates the universe:

Because of time (kalat), from the voids (sunyesu), originate wind, fire, water, the earth; the continents, mountains, and oceans; the constellations, the sun, the moon, the host of star-planets, and the sages; gods, bhutas, and nagas; animals that have four types of birthplace; humans and hell beings also, on the manifold earth and below -originate in the middle of void (sunyamadhye), like salt in water, and the egg-born in the middle of an egg.

Chakra, in turn, refers to the universe and all things in it (i.e. the five aggregates, constituents and bases of the world), which exist as cyclical patterns powered by time. Kāla is also said to be knowledge (jñana) and chakra is the knowable (jneya). In the universal sense then, the term Kālacakra is all-inclusive and refers to the unity of the basis of reality and reality itself. According to Wallace, from the point of view of ultimate reality, "Kālacakra" refers to,

the nonduality of two facets of a single reality—namely, wisdom (prajña), or emptiness (sunyata), and method (upaya), or compassion (karuna). The word "time" refers to the gnosis of imperishable bliss (aksara-sukha-jñana), which is a method consisting of compassion; and the word "wheel" designates wisdom consisting of emptiness. Their unity is the Buddha Kālacakra.

Thus, Kālacakra refers to the manifestations of cyclic existence and nirvana, as well as its causes. Kālacakra therefore represents a single unified reality (also called Adibuddha, Sahajakaya, Jñanakaya, Sahajananda and Vajrayoga). When this reality manifests itself as numerous phenomena, it is called samsara. Vesna Wallace notes how the idea of time as a universal creative reality has precursors in Vedic literature and in the Upanishads and that it is likely that they inspired the Kālacakratantra's theory of the wheel of time.

However, the Kālacakratantra is clear that Kālacakra is itself empty of inherent existence (i.e. essence) and is not an independent phenomenon, but one which is dependent on conditions (a classic Madhyamaka position). As Wallace notes, the cosmic body and the body of the individual is made up of various cycles of dependent origination. Furthermore, "each cycle of dependent origination, which comprises progressively smaller cycles of dependent origination, arises in dependence upon other cycles of dependent origination and is therefore itself empty of inherent existence."

=== Deity and the Adibuddha ===
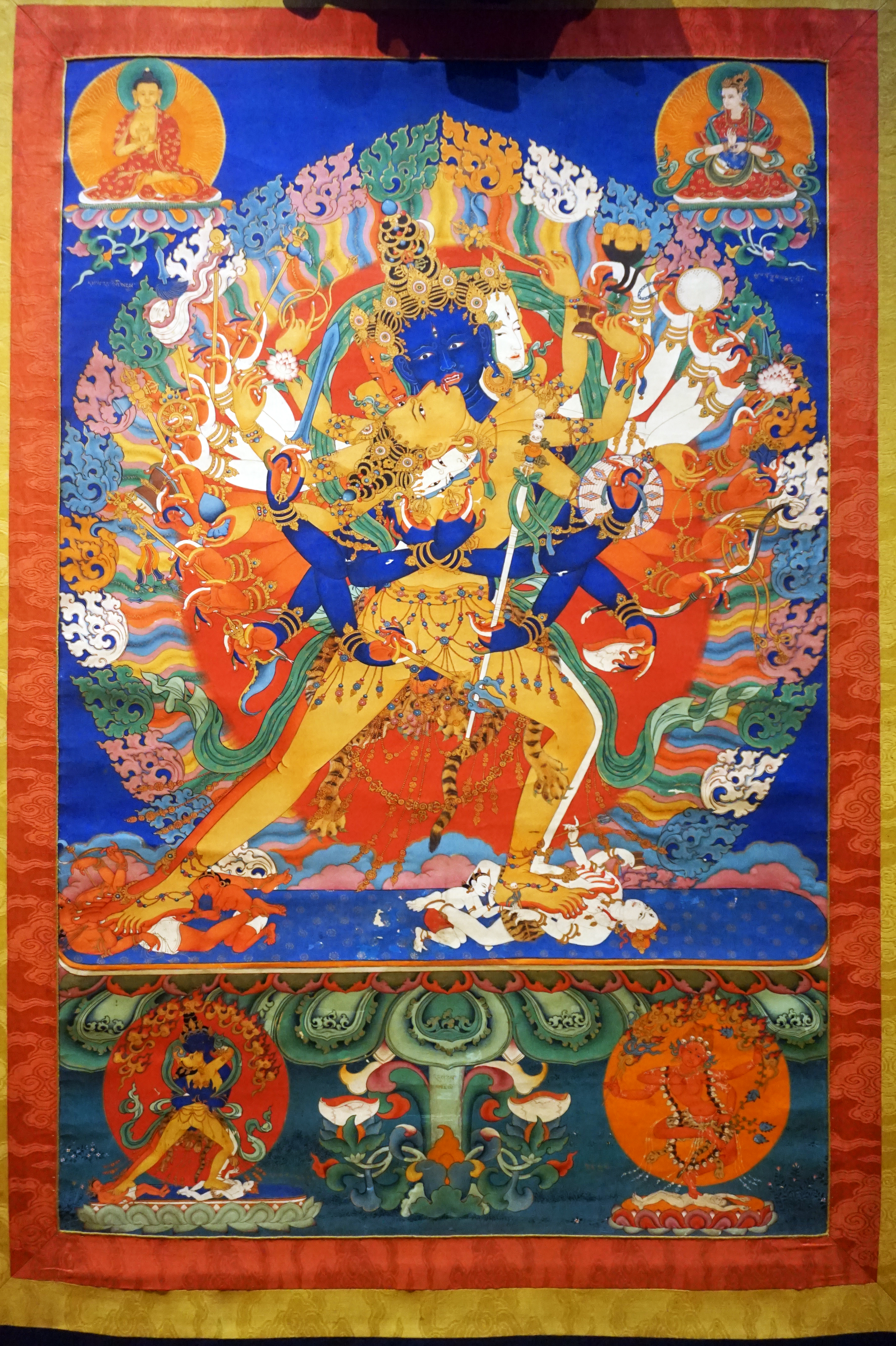
Kālacakra deity with consort Visvamata

Kālacakra also refers to a specific deity who appears as a fierce multi-armed blue deity in sexual union (yab-yum) with a consort called Visvamata (or Kālacakri). The Kālacakratantra's first chapter introduces the deity as follows:

Homage to Kālacakra, who has as his content emptiness and compassion, without origination or annihilation of the three existences, who is regarding a consistent embodiment of knowledge and objects of knowledge as non-existence.

The Kālacakra deities represent the aspects of Buddhahood: the non-dual (advaya) union of compassion and emptiness, the union of prajña and upaya, as well as the mahasukha (great bliss) of enlightenment. Since Kālacakra is time and everything is the flow of time, Kālacakra knows all. Kālacakri, his spiritual consort and complement, is aware of everything that is timeless, not time-bound or out of the realm of time. The two deities are thus temporality and atemporality conjoined. Similarly, the wheel or circle (chakra) is without beginning or end (representing timelessness), thus the term Kāla-cakra includes what is timeless and time itself. One of the key topics of the Kālacakratantra is the Adibuddha (Primordial Buddha or First Buddha). Regarding the Adibuddha, the tantra states:

To the one embraced by the Bhagavati Prajña, the one who is aspectless although possessing aspect; to the one who has the bliss of the unchanging and who has abandoned the pleasures of laughter and so forth; to the progenitor of the Buddhas, without origination and annihilation, possessing the three bodies, rightly knowing the three times – the omniscient Bhagavan Paramadhibuddha, I worship that very non-duality.

Vesna Wallace notes that in this tantra, the Adibuddha is spoken of in two distinct ways. The first one is the idea that there is a being who was "the first to obtain Buddhahood by means of the imperishable bliss characterized by perfect awakening in a single moment." The Kālacakra literature also refers to an Adibuddha who has been awakened since beginningless time, "without beginning or end". According to Wallace, this refers to "the innate gnosis that pervades the minds of all sentient beings and stands as the basis of both samsara and nirvana."

Similarly, there is an ambiguity in the way the deity Kālacakra is explained in the tantra. According to Hammar, sometimes Kālacakra refers to the Adibuddha (which is uncreated, beyond time, eternal, the origin of the world, omniscient, non-dual and beyond causality), while sometimes the name Kālacakra refers specifically to the male figure in union with Visvamata. Regarding the difficult and complex term Adibuddha, Hammar concludes that one can see it as one way of describing Buddha-nature, "which means that there is a Buddha-seed in human beings which is always there." It can also be another way of describing sunyata (emptiness), which is also present everywhere.

Some passages of the tantra also mention Sakyamuni Buddha. They note how he transformed himself into Kālacakra when he taught the tantra to Sucandra, the king of Shambala. Some passages from the tantra also equate Sakyamuni with Adibuddha.

=== Mandala ===
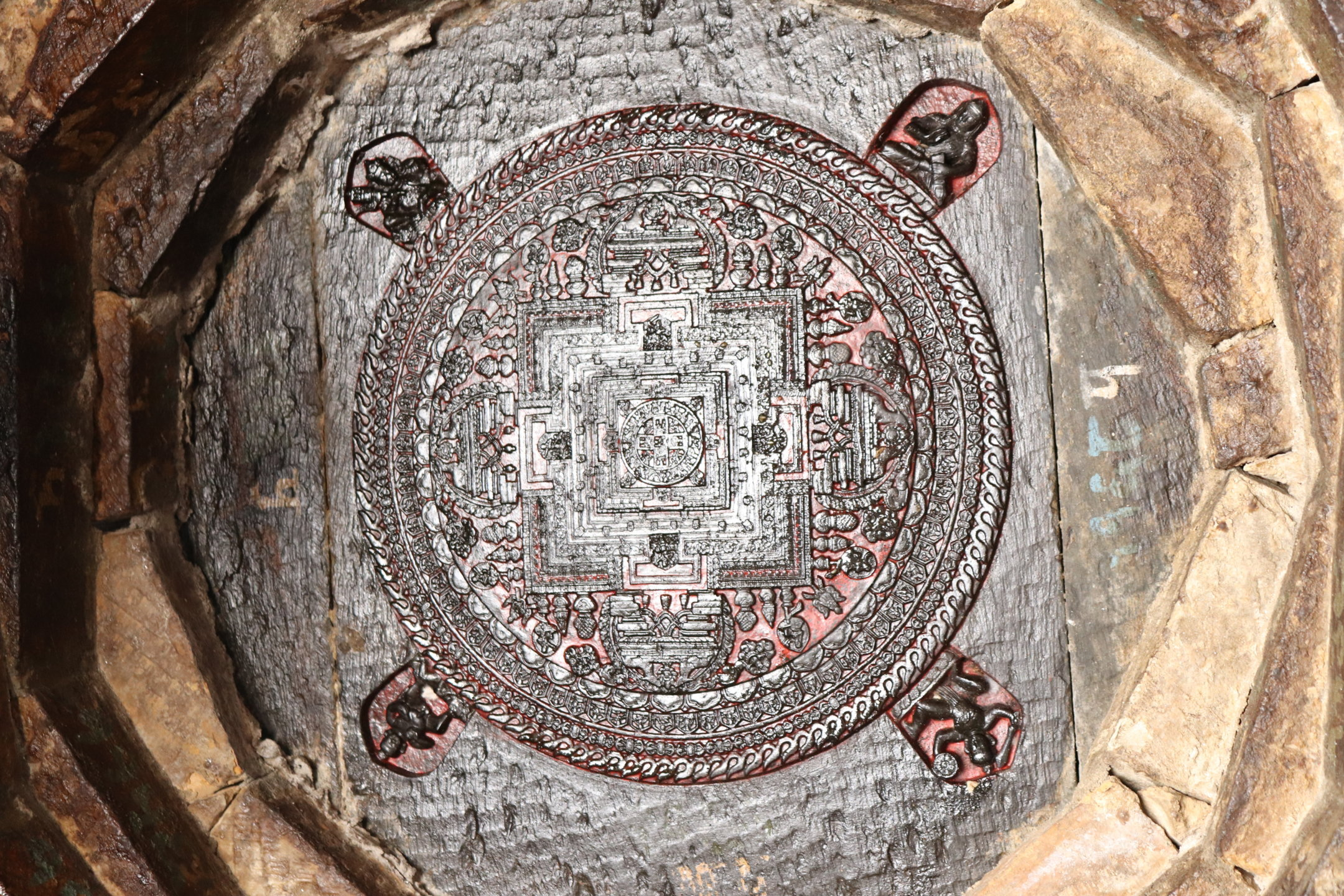
A stone Kālacakra Mandala at the Hiraṇyavarṇa Mahāvihāra, a Buddhist temple in Patan, Nepal built in the 12th century.

The Kālacakra deity and his consort reside in the center of the Kālacakra mandala in a palace consisting of four mandalas, one within the other: the mandalas of body, speech, and mind, and in the very center, wisdom and great bliss.

The deities of the mandala are classified into various sets of families or clans (kula) as follows:

- Three families representing body, speech, and mind; the left, right, and central channels; to the realms of desire, form, and formlessness and to the three bodies of the Buddha.
- The four families corresponds to uterine blood, semen, mind, and gnosis; to body, speech, mind, and gnosis; to the four drops (bindu); to the four states of the mind—namely, waking, dreaming, deep sleep, and the fourth state; to the sun, moon, Rahu, and Agni (Ketu), and in terms of society, they are the four castes.
- The five families are the five psycho-physical aggregates (skandha), and in terms of society, they are the four castes and the outcastes. With regard to ultimate reality, they are the five types of the Buddha's gnosis manifesting as the five Buddhas—Aksobhya, Vairocana, Ratnasambhava, Amitabha, and Amoghasiddhi.
- The six families are the five psycho-physical aggregates and their emptiness; and in terms of society, they are the four castes and the classes of Dombas and Candalas. With regard to ultimate reality, the six families are the five aforementioned Buddhas and the Svabhavikakaya.

=== Socio-political teaching ===
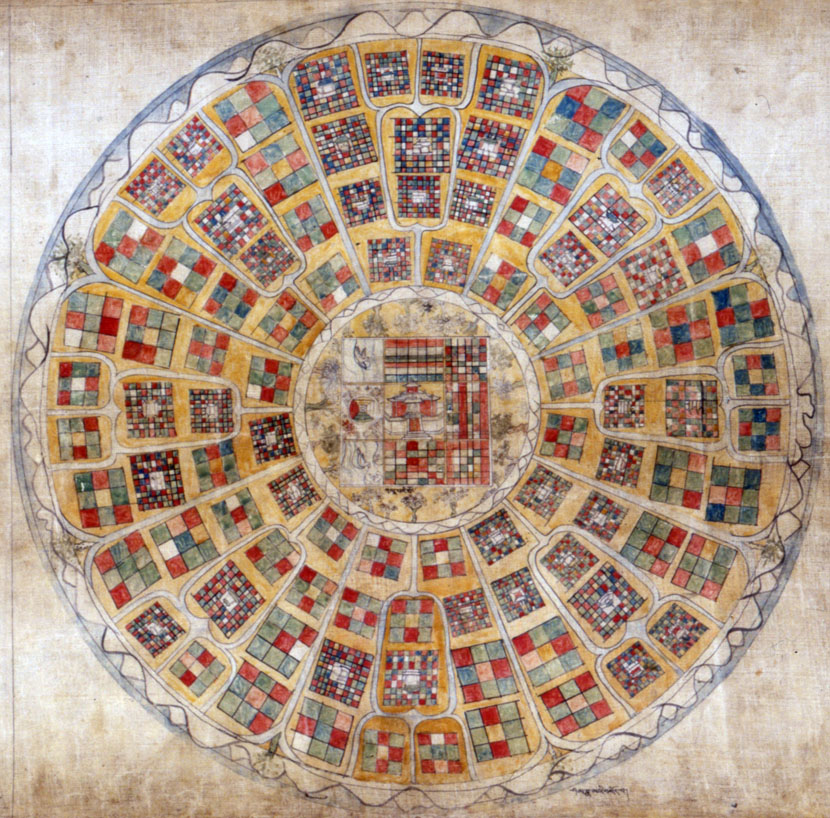
Tibetan map of Shambhala (16th century), the ideal society depicted in the Kālacakra tradition

The Kālacakratantra contains various ideas about society, the individual's place in society and how they are interrelated. These provide a sociological theory which forms the framework for the Kālacakratantra's ideas on history, prophecy and soteriology. The Kālacakra system is unique in that it is the only Buddhist tantra that explores these social and caste issues at length.

Like earlier Buddhist texts and traditions, the Kālacakra literature is sharply critical of traditional Indian caste divisions and Brahmanical views of the hierarchy and status of the castes as being divinely ordained and as having inherent moral qualities. Indian Buddhists replaced this model with the idea that all humans are roughly equal and that caste divisions are mere conventional designations. The Kālacakratantra adopts these views and also interprets them through a tantric lens. In the Kālacakra system, all people are equal since they are all empty of inherent existence, are all part of the same non-dual reality, i.e. Kālacakra and thus all have the potential for Buddhahood.

The Kālacakra tradition saw attachment to caste and family as spiritual blocks and Kālacakra texts warn against social discrimination, which is based on this attachment and has negative effects on one's practice of the path. Indeed, Kālacakra texts often see the absence of attachment to social status as a prerequisite for receiving tantric teachings. Because of this, Kālacakra texts attempts to show the insubstantiality of social class and caste and thus to refute the basis for attachment to caste. According to Wallace, "to demonstrate the untenability of social discrimination, the Kālacakratantra at times uses a type of analysis that is similar to the one frequently applied in Buddhist refutations of the independent existence of a personal identity."

The Kālacakra system also links the soteriological implications of social relationships to socio-political events. Negative events, such as the Muslim conquests of India and the decline of Buddhism in India, are linked to social segregation and divisions (based on corrupt Puranic teaching). Meanwhile, positive events such as the defeat of "the barbarian Dharma" (i.e. Islam) are linked with social and spiritual unification of all castes, outcastes and barbarians into one single vajra-family. Because the Vaisnava and Saiva Dharmas promote class prejudice (jati-vada), create a false sense of identity based on caste, and thus create social divisions, the Kālacakra tradition admonishes Buddhist practitioners not to admire or follow these Dharmas. The tradition also sees caste theory as being related to false theories of a self (atman), to linguistic prejudice (based around the belief in the superiority of Sanskrit) and to theories of a creator god.

Due to these concerns, the tantric pledges found in the Kālacakra system involve transgressions of Indian social conventions, such as associating with and being in physical contact with all the various social classes without distinction, and seeing them as equal. This was often acted out in tantric ritual feasts known as ganachakras, wherein everyone was considered part of one vajra-family. This practice of social equality was also not meant to be limited to ritual contexts, as seems to have been the case within Saiva tantra.

The Kālacakra system also explains how all of society is in a way also included within the microcosm of the individual's body, which is a manifestation of the socio-religious body. Thus, the different types of persons and castes are mapped into the physical features of a person's body and the elements which make up a sentient being (aggregates, sense faculties, etc.). According to Wallace, the interrelatedness and mutual pervasiveness of the various components of the individual's mind and body represent the social and ethnic integration of a socially and ethnically mixed society."

Regarding the sociology of the Kālacakratantra, Wallace concludes:

the mutual relations and influences of the individual, the cosmos, and time parallel those in the society. Thus, the organization and functions of the different members of the social body are non-dual from the structure and functions of the different members of the bodies of the individual, the cosmos, and enlightened awareness...Just as the transformation and unification of the various components of one's own mind and body on this tantric path transform one's experience of one's natural environment, so it transforms one's experience of one's social environment. Likewise, in this tantric tradition, the unification of all the phenomenal and ultimate aspects of the vajra-family, which abolishes all dualities, is nothing other than the state of self-knowing: the state of knowing oneself as the cosmos, society, individual, and enlightened awareness; and that self-knowledge is what is meant by omniscience (sarva-jnana) in the tradition of the Kālacakratantra.

=== Shambhala kingdom and Islamophobia ===
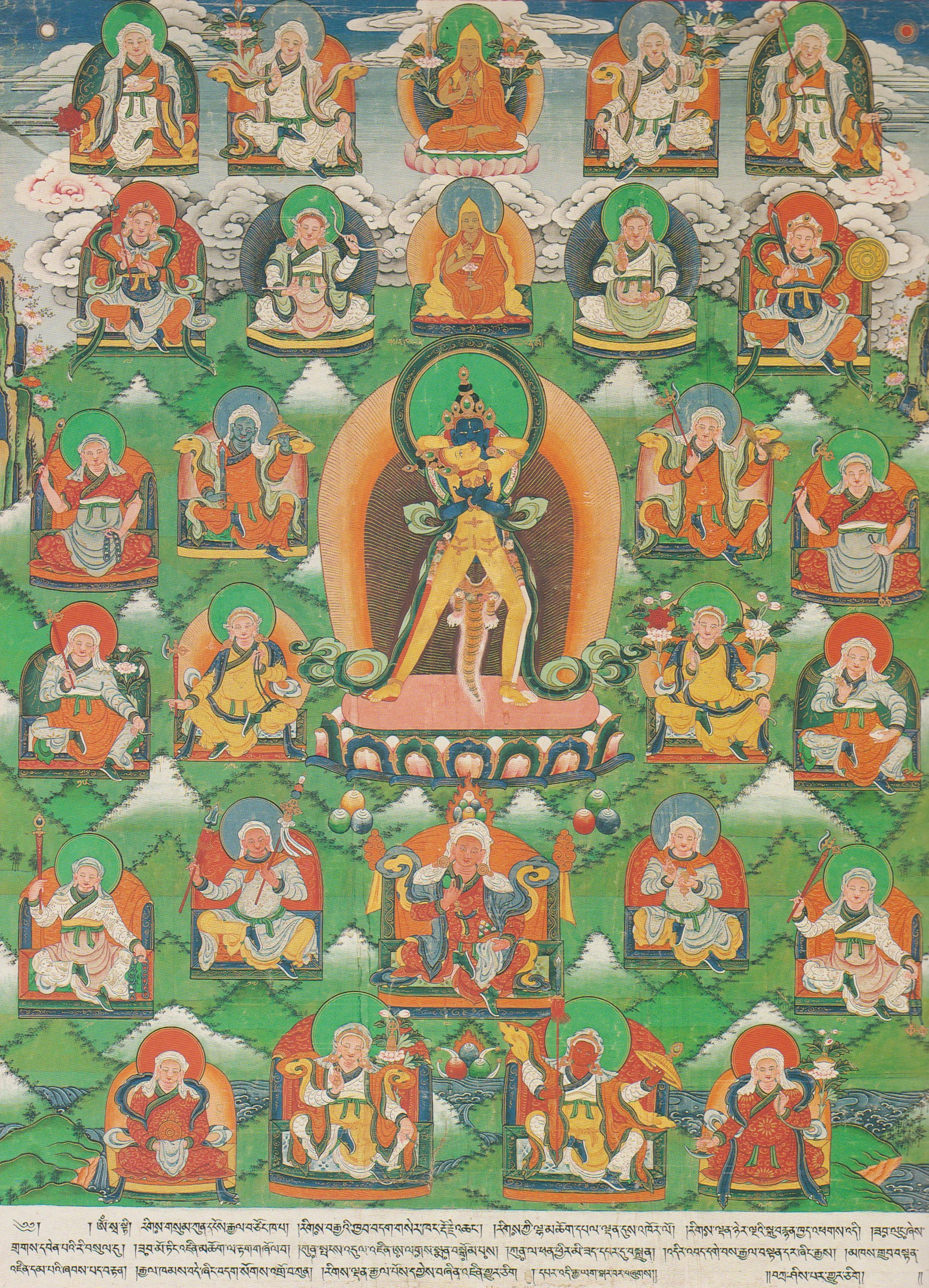
The 25 Kings of Shambhala. Central figure is a yidam, a meditation deity in Tantric Buddhism. The middle figure in the top row represents the Tibetan Buddhist yogi and philosopher Je Tsongkhapa.

The Kālacakratantra contains passages that refer to a Buddhist kingdom called "Shambhala", which is ruled by a line of thirty-two Buddhist kings that preserve the Kālacakra teachings. This kingdom is said to be located near Mount Kailasa and its capital is Kalāpa. It also mentions how this kingdom comes into conflict with invaders called mleccha ("barbarians"), which most scholars agree refers to Muslims and the Muslim invasions of India.

According to John Newman, the Buddhists who composed the Kālacakratantra likely borrowed the Hindu concept of Kalki and adapted the concept. They combined their idea of Shambhala with Kalki to reflect the theo-political situation they faced after the arrival of Islam in Central Asia and western Tibet. The text prophesies a war fought by a massive army of Buddhists and Hindus, led by King Raudra Kalkin, against the Muslim persecutors. Then after the victory of good over evil and attainment of religious freedom, Kalki ushers in a new era of peace and Sambhala will become a place of perfection. Further battles with the barbarians are described as well in later eras.

Urban Hammar notes that a passage from the tantra mentions a series of figures who are said to be in the service of demonic snakes. These figures are "Adam, Noah, Abraham, Moses, Jesus, "The white-clad one", Muhammed, and Mathani." Hammar adds that "Muhammed and his teaching of Islam is presented as a barbaric teaching and consequently the main enemy of Buddhism."

According to John Newman, passages from the Vimalaprabhā also mention a year from the Islamic calendar (403 AH, 1012–1013 CE). This supports the dating of this Kālacakra tradition text to the 11th century by Tibetan and Western scholars, as well as the link to the Indian history of that era which saw conflicts with Islamic Ghaznavid invaders. Alexander Berzin also notes that Tibetan sources mention the "barbarians" slaughtering cattle while reciting the name of their god, the veiling of women, circumcision, and five daily prayers facing their holy land, all of which leaves little doubt that the prophecy part of the text is referring to Muslims.

According to the Kālacakratantra, the battle with the barbarians will be an "illusory battle". Furthermore, some passages of the Kālacakratantra describes the holy war against the barbarians from a microcosmic perspective as taking place within the body and mind of the Buddhist practitioner. These verses equate the barbarians with mental defilements and bad mental states such as ignorance. They equate victory in battle to the attainment of liberation and the defeat of Mara (Death).

The Kālacakratantra states:

The fight with the mleccha-kings is actually taking place in the body of human beings. That which in the Makha district is an illusory battle with the barbarians is no battle.

The Vimalaprabhā states:

The fight takes place in the body because the battle with the mleccha king is tied to the body, in the middle of the body and because the outer is the form of illusion and the mleccha-battle in the Makha-kingdom is not the battle.

Hammar concludes:

A radical conclusion is given in this verse. The fight is really in the body and is a way of liberation in the Buddhist sense. In the texts, it is obvious that the inner fight has a higher value of truth than the outer. Reading what is actually written in the text, it is said that the fight in the outer world is not going to take place. The famous eschatological battle between the king of Shambhala, the Kalkin, will not take place and instead it is a method of meditation. The inner way with liberation and illumination is superior. But in the end, because maya (the illusory world) is mentioned in this context, it is possible to imagine that what happens in the outer world indeed is an illusion, but it still has a certain value of reality. The explanation written in these verses is normally not given in the Kalacakra initiations where much stress is laid on the point that everybody who participates in the initiation is going to take part in the eschatological battle by the side of the twenty-fifth king of Shambhala, the Raudra Kalkin in the year 2325. Here it seems rather to be a method of meditation.

=== Subtle body ===
A key element of the Kālacakra teachings is an understanding of certain subtle energetic aspects of the human body. In Kālacakra (as in other tantric traditions), the human body is believed to contain certain subtle elements, mainly the three channels (nadis, left, right and central), the vital winds (lung, prana), the four drops (bindus) and six chakras. These elements function in a cyclical fashion, similar to how cosmological elements also have their cyclical movements. The Kālacakratantra contains detailed descriptions of these subtle body elements. In the Kālacakra system, the six chakras that lie along the central channel are as follows:

1. The Crown Chakra
2. Forehead Chakra
3. Throat Chakra
4. Heart Chakra
5. Navel Chakra
6. Secret Place Chakra

These subtle elements are used during tantric meditation practice to attain immutable bliss and primordial wisdom. Alexander Berzin writes that "during the Kalachakra empowerment, visualizations of different syllables and colored discs at these spots purify both the chakras and their associated elements."

According to Gen Lamrimpa: "The Kālacakra Tantra emphasizes the attainment of a buddha body by means of the empty form body, which is used to attain immutable bliss, the mind of a buddha. This differs from other highest yoga tantras, in which the buddha body is attained by transforming the extremely subtle primordial energy into the illusory body."

=== Adoption of non-Buddhist content ===
According to Vesna Wallace, in the Kālacakratantra one finds "a self-conscious absorption, or appropriation, of the modes of expression that are characteristic of the rival religious systems of India." This adoption of non-buddhist content extends to various areas of the tantra's system, including its theory, language, medicine and cosmology. Wallace argues that this is "inextricably related to Buddhist tantric conversionary efforts" and is justified by the tantra "as a skillful means for leading individuals of diverse mental dispositions to spiritual maturation." The tantra also warns that one should not grasp at one's own view in a dogmatic way, but it also states that one should be careful not to fall under the influence of other teachings "by familiarizing one-self with those teachings in order to refute them."

The Kālacakratantra refers to and draws from many different traditions, including non-Buddhist traditions such as the Shaiva, Samkhya, Vaishnava, Jain, Vedic, and Puranic traditions. The Kālacakra mandala also includes deities which are equally accepted by Hindus, Jains and Buddhists. The ideas of these traditions are adopted and re-interpreted from a Buddhist perspective. Some examples of non-buddhist doctrines that the Kālacakratantra makes use of include: the Samkhya doctrines of prakrti and purusha (as well as the 25 tattvas and the three gunas), the concept of the fourth state (turiya) possibly drawn from the Saiva Agamas, and the ten avatars of Vishnu. Also, according to Wallace, the tantra "incorporates into its mandala the diverse deities that were worshipped by both Buddhists and non-Buddhists."

Vesna Wallace further notes that,

The fact that the conversion of heterodox groups was one of the motivations behind the Kālacakratantra's adoption of specific non-Buddhist ideas implies that its teachings pertaining to the Kalacakra worldview were not kept secret from the public; that is, they were not guarded as secret teachings intended for an initiated elite. Moreover, the Kālacakra tradition's preference for explicitly presenting its specific tantric views is a result of its openly professed conversionary endeavors.

Wallace notes that a study of the Kālacakra literature shows that the teachings were meant to be accessible to non-Buddhist groups. The Kālacakratantra states that "one will obtain purity and all virtues by receiving the initiation" whether one is Buddhist, Saiva, Brahmana, Jaina, etc. It also says that initiation into the Kālacakra mandala is also initiation into the mandalas of all deities, including those of non-Buddhists. The tantra also states that the Kālacakra Buddha is the source and teacher of all religious systems, and thus affirms their value while also subsuming them into Buddhist tantra and providing a justification for the tantra's adoption of non-buddhist ideas. These religious systems are of course, reinterpreted in new ways. For example, the Vedic sacrifice is reinterpreted in terms of the practice of tantric yoga.

However, while the Kālacakratantra adopts non-buddhist content, it criticizes the Brahmanical Puranic religion. According to Wallace, the text "frequently refers to the Brahmanic teachings, especially those of the Puranas, as false teachings, devoid of reasoning, creating confusion among foolish people, and composed by corrupt Brahmanic sages for the sake of promoting their own social class."

== Practice ==
=== Initiation and preliminaries ===
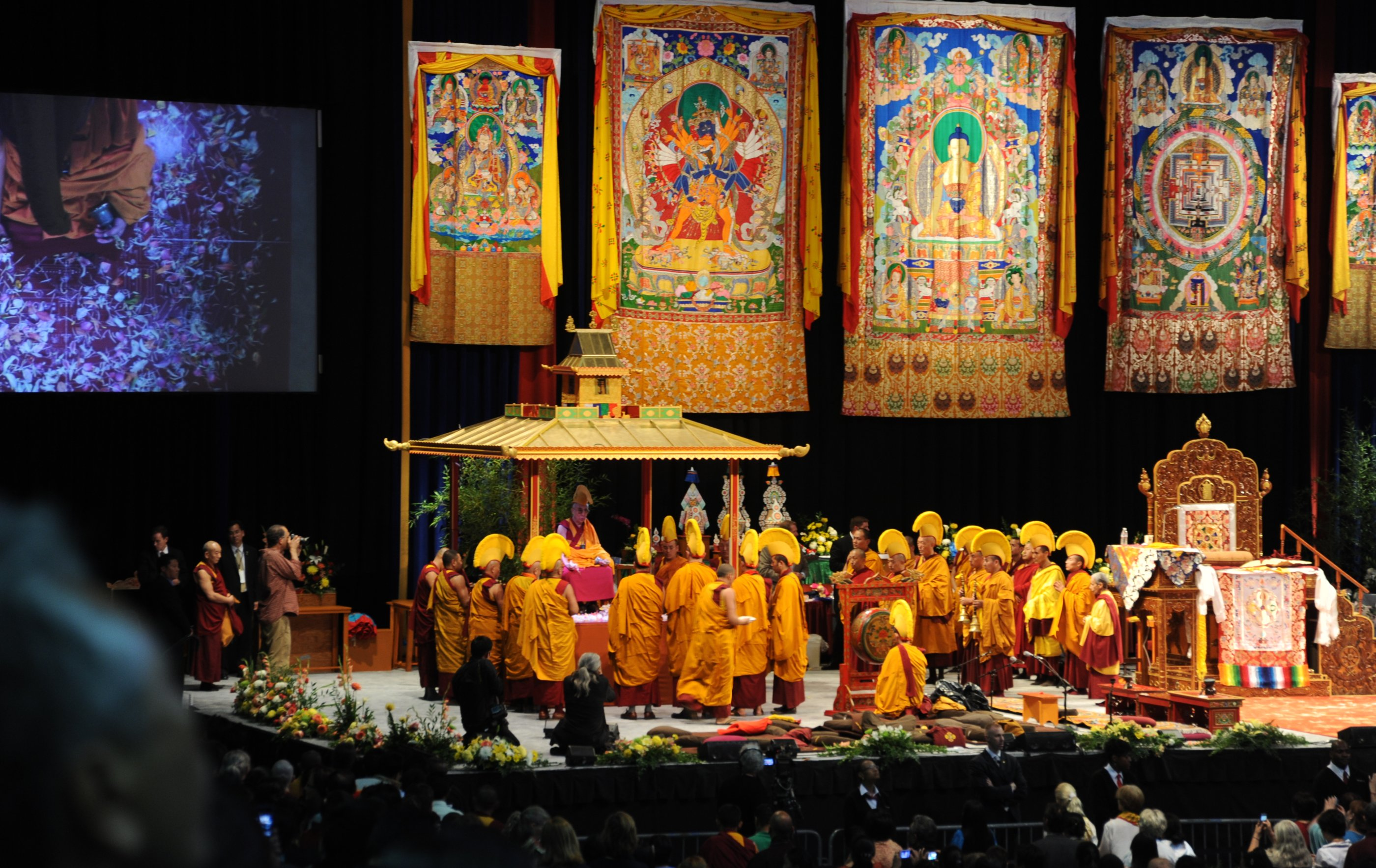
The 14th Dalai Lama praying in the pavilion, closing the Kālacakra mandala and offering flowers, during a Kālacakra initiation in Washington, D.C., 2011

Most Tibetan Buddhist lineages require initiates to practice various preliminary practices before attempting Kālacakra yoga proper. In the Jonang school for example, the common preliminaries are:

1. Refuge in the three jewels and prostrations
2. Awakening bodhicitta (the compassionate resolve to awaken for the sake of all beings)
3. Vajrasattva meditation and recitation for purification purposes
4. Mandala offerings
5. Guru yoga

Geshe Lharampa Ngawang Dhargyey notes that bodhicitta is particularly essential, along with having renunciation and right view (these three common practices are also seen as necessary by Sakya Pandita). Without these foundational Buddhist elements (which are shared with common Mahayana), tantric practice will not bear fruit. Gen Lamrimpa similarly notes that without Mahayana great compassion, one will not attain Buddhahood through tantra. Lamrimpa also notes that one must have some understanding of emptiness before receiving initiation.

As in all Vajrayana practices, a disciple must undergo ritual initiation (abhiseka) under a qualified Vajra master to practice the Kālacakra methods. The Kālacakratantra states that disciples must carefully investigate one's tantric master beforehand, so as not to end up practicing a distorted teaching. The tantra also lists various qualities of a proper tantric master, such as being free of greed, having tantric pledges, and being devoid of mental afflictions (klesa). A corrupt teacher however is conceited, angry and greedy.

There are two main sets of initiations in Kālacakra: the “Entering as a child” set and the “Supreme” set of initiations. The first of these two sets concerns preparation for the generation stage meditations of Kālacakra. The second concerns preparation for the completion stage meditations known as the Six Yogas of Kālacakra. Attendees who don't intend to carry out the practice are often only given the lower seven initiations. The tantric initiations are also said to facilitate the purification of the four drops (bindus). The initiations include a series of ritual acts, meditations and visualizations. The supreme initiations include visualizing oneself as the deity, engaging in sexual union with the deity's consort and experiencing sexual bliss.

The tantric initiations include sets of tantric vows or pledges called samaya (such as the fourteen root downfalls etc.). If these are not kept, the practice will not bear fruit. The same applies to the bodhisattva precepts.

After the preparatory steps have been taken, one can embark on the actual practice of Kālacakra, which relies on two main methods. Vesna Wallace outlines these as follows:

One is a conceptual method of familiarizing oneself with the ultimate nature of one's own mind by means of autosuggestion, specifically by means of generating oneself in the form of the deities of the kalacakra-mandala. The other method is a non conceptual method of spontaneous and direct recognition of gnosis as the ultimate nature of one's own mind. The first method, which is characteristic of the stage of generation (utpatti krama), is contrived and based on one's faith in the innately pure nature of one's own mind, and it uses primarily one's powers of imagination. Even though it is characterized by freedom from grasping onto one's own ordinary psycho-physical aggregates, or one's self-identity as an ordinary being, it is still characterized by holding onto the imagined self-identity. The second method, which is characteristic of the stage of completion (sampatti krama), draws upon the experience of imperishable bliss and the direct perception of the innately pure nature of one's own mind, which is devoid of grasping onto any identity.

Unlike other anuttara-yoga tantras, the goal of Kālacakra practice is not the transformation of the vital winds (pranas) into an illusory body, rather, the Kālacakra system's goal is the "windless state" (avata), which is "the complete eradication of all present and future pranas." This is said to lead to the arising of the body of empty form ("the form of emptiness"), and the mind of immutable bliss.

=== Generation stage ===
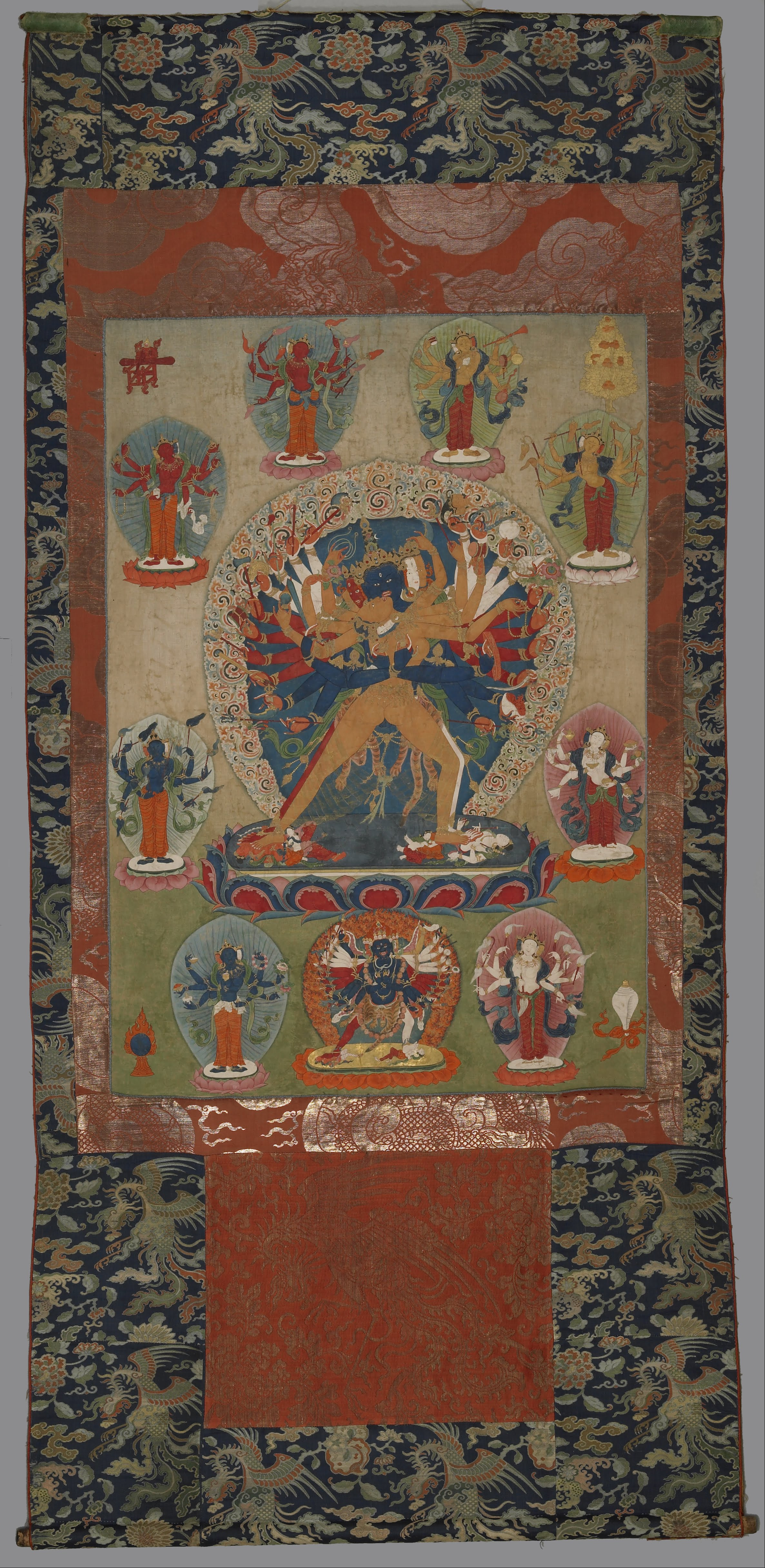
Kālacakra and core assembly.

Generation stage (bskyed rim) practices generally consist of meditative visualizations, mainly of oneself as the Kālacakra deity in union with his consort Visvamata, and of the Kālacakra mandala and attendant deities. The first part of this stage is also known as deity-yoga (devata-yoga).

This is generally preceded by classic Mahayana practices such as taking refuge, arousing bodhicitta and so on. Then the meditator "imaginatively dissolves the atomic structure of his own body and the body of the universe," in a process which is supposed to mimic the dying process. Then they meditate on empty form. Then follows the meditation on the mandala and of oneself as the deities. The various features and symbols of the mandala (including the deities) correspond to various Buddhist doctrines and to aspects of the bodies of the Buddha. For example, the four sides of the mandala correspond to the four applications of mindfulness.

The visualizations are also paired with mantra recitation. There are different mantras in the system, but the main mantra is:

Oṃ āḥ hūṃ ho haṃ kṣa malavaraya hūṃ phaṭ

There are also various sadhanas (texts outlining the practice) of different complexities, the most complex of which can include up to 634 deities while one of the simplest ones includes nine deities. Generation stage practice is said to continue to purify the four drops.

According to Geshe Lharampa Ngawang Dhargyey, there is no need to practice samatha ('clear stillness') separately, as the culmination of the generation stage leads to the attainment of samatha. Furthermore, this practice also facilitates the attainment of insight (vipasyana) into the impermanent, empty and blissful nature of the visualized imagery.

According to Geshe Lharampa, the main objective of the generation stage is to dispel ordinary appearances and ordinary conceptions. Everything in one's experience (what one sees, ones thoughts, etc.) is to be seen as being the mandala and deities. There are two elements of this, divine pride (the self-confidence that one actually is the deity) and clear appearance (of the visualization).

The development of "divine pride" is based on some understanding of the emptiness of inherent existence of the deities that one is identifying with. Indeed, according to the Kālacakratantra, generation stage practice is based on one's understanding of emptiness, and thus should only be done once one has had some realization into emptiness. Furthermore, it is also based on the understanding that the entire mandala is an illusion (maya) and an ideation (kalpana).

Following the practice of deity yoga visualization, there are two further yogic practices which are part of the stage of generation: the yoga of drops (bindu-yoga) and the subtle yoga (suksma-yoga). Both of these involve a sadhana on sexual bliss, most often done with an imagined consort or "gnosis-consort" (jnana-mudra). The yoga of drops requires generation of inner heat or candali (tummo), which incinerates the pranas in the channels and allows the seminal essence or bodhicitta to flow into the chakras, generating the four blisses. During the practice of the subtle yoga, a drop of purified bodhicitta enters the secret chakra and ascends up the central channel generating the four blisses and transforming the four drops into the four bodies of the Buddha.

=== Six Yogas of the Completion Stage ===
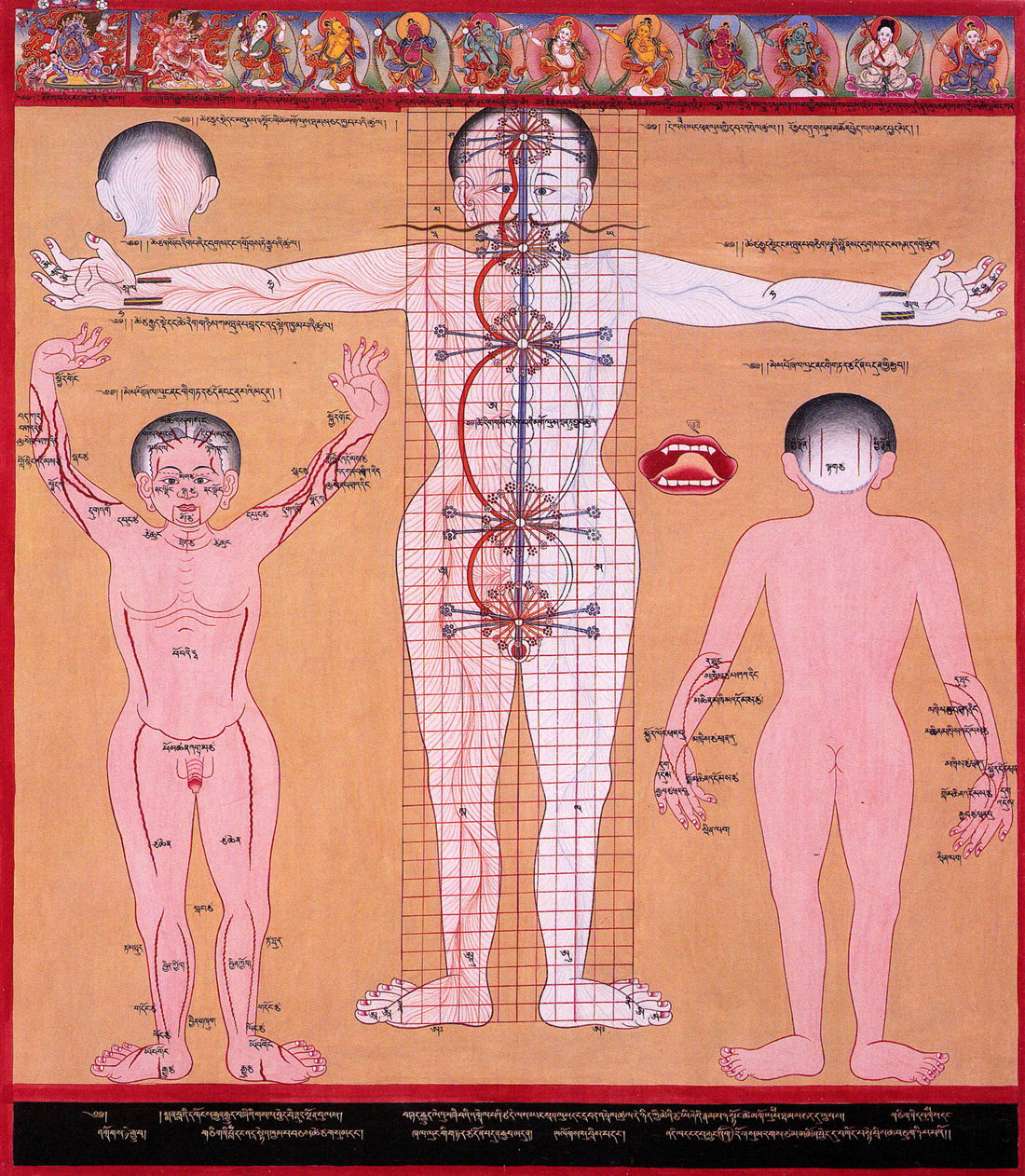
A Tibetan illustration depicting the central channel and the two side channels as well as five chakras where the channels loop around each other. The Kālacakra system adds one more chakra at the crown of the head, the Ushnisha.

In Kālacakra, the yoga of the generation stage is seen as being characterized by ideation or imagination (kalpana), and thus can only indirectly induce spiritual awakening (as well as mundane siddhis). The Completion Stage yogas however are seen as free of ideation, uncontrived and non-conceptual (since their focus is the form of emptiness, not the deity's bodily form). They are thus the most important yogas for the direct attainment of the mahamudra-siddhi (i.e. prajnaparamita) and thus of the attainment of Buddhadhood.

The Kālacakra system's Completion Stage (rdzogs rim) practices include a set of practices known as the "Six Phase Yoga" (Ṣaḍaṅga-yoga, sbyor drug) also known as the "Six Vajra-Yogas". This system has a close connection to previous Indian systems of six phased yogas, the first of which appears in the Maitri Upanishad. The practices of the six phased yoga are based on the subtle body system of channels (nadis), winds (lung, prana), drops (bindus) and chakras, and require a foundation of generation stage practice.

The six yogas are as follows:

- The Yoga of Retraction (pratyāhara, so sor sdud pa). This practice involves bringing the vital winds (pranas) into the central channel where they are dissolved. This is done by focusing the mind on the aperture of the central channel in the top of the forehead with eyes open and an upward gaze (the "gaze of Ushnishacakri"). When the vital winds cease to flow in the side channels, the connection between the five sense faculties and their objects is severed and craving for material things diminishes. When this happens, extraordinary signs which are also called empty forms arise (the sign of smoke, a mirage, fire-flies, a lamp, a flame, the moon, the sun, the supreme form, and a drop/bindu) and become more vivid the more stabilized the mind becomes. The first four signs appear when practicing at night or in a dark enclosed space and the others appear while practicing in the daytime and while meditating on open space. A drop/bindu with a Buddha at the center will appear as the tenth sign.
- Yoga of Meditation (dhyāna, bsam gtan). This yoga refers to meditative absorption of the "all-pervading form" (visva-bimba), which is also practiced with the gaze of Ushnishacakri. It is defined as a mind that has become unified with empty form as an object and has the five factors of wisdom (prajna), investigation (tarka), analysis (vicara), joy (rati), and immutable bliss (acala-sukha). The ten signs also may spontaneously reappear. Daytime practice of this yoga is achieved by gazing at the cloudless sky with one's back turned to the sun until a shining black line appears in the center of the sign of the sign of the drop. The body of the Buddha will appear in the central channel, looking like the sun's image in water with all colors.
- Yoga of Wind Control (prāṇāyāma, srog rtsol). By concentrating on the navel chakra, one draws in and stabilizes the pranas in that chakra, which is the seat of the drop associated with the fourth state of mind (turiya). Then one apprehends and moves the arisen form of Kālacakra's sambhogakaya into the navel where it merges with the drop. The deities remain in the navel chakra, and then ascend and descend the central channel during the process of inhalation and exhalation. The external breath ceases and the meditator practices kumbhaka (breath hold). This allows one to stabilize the mind on the navel chakra, which leads to the arising of inner heat (candali, tummo) which melts the four drops. One then experiences the four blisses.
- Yoga of Retention (dharāṇā, ‘dzin pa). This entails the unification of the vital winds or pranas in the navel chakra accompanied by the manifestation of Kālacakra and consort, followed by the sequential concentration on the chakras of the heart, throat, forehead and ushnisha which cause the pranas to dissolve the four elements of water, fire, wind and space associated with these chakras. This leads to the experience of the four blisses. Afterwards, the pranas cease and the mind becomes unified. One then apprehends the form of emptiness (sunyata-bimba).
- Yoga of Recollection (anusmṛiti, rjes dran). This is the non-conceptual union of the mind with empty form. One perceives innumerable rays of light consisting of five colors in the navel chakra. This results in the realization of the form of gnosis (jnana-bimba) or the empty form. One becomes purified and appears as a stainless disc of light.
- Yoga of Samādhi (ting nge ‘dzin). The red and white drops are stacked along the central channel causing immutable blisses, the cessation of all pranas and the transformation of the material body into a body that is not material, the empty form body, which is also the four bodies of the Buddha. According to Wallace: "the object of gnosis (jneya) and gnosis (jnana) itself become unified and give rise to supreme, imperishable bliss. For that reason, the samadhi that is practiced here is defined as 'a meditative concentration on the form of gnosis (jnana-bimba).' It is also interpreted as the imperishable bliss that arises from the union of the apprehended object (grahya) and the apprehending subject (grahaka) "

== Kālacakra lineages ==
Butön Rinchen Drup had considerable influence on the later development of the Gelug and Sakya traditions of Kālacakra while Dölpopa and Tāranātha were the main figures who developed the Jonang tradition on which the Kagyu, Nyingma, and the Tsarpa branch of the Sakya draw. The Jonang tradition mainly use the texts of Jonang masters Bamda Gelek Gyatso and Tāranātha to teach Kālacakra. The Nyingma and Kagyu rely on the Kālacakra works of Jamgon Ju Mipham Gyatso and Jamgon Kongtrul, both of whom took a strong interest in the Jonang Kālacakra tradition. The Tsarpa branch of the Sakya maintain the practice lineage for the six branch yoga of Kālacakra in the Jonang tradition.

There were many other influences and much cross-fertilization between the different traditions, and indeed the 14th Dalai Lama asserted that it is acceptable for those initiated in one Kālacakra tradition to practice in others.

=== Jonang ===
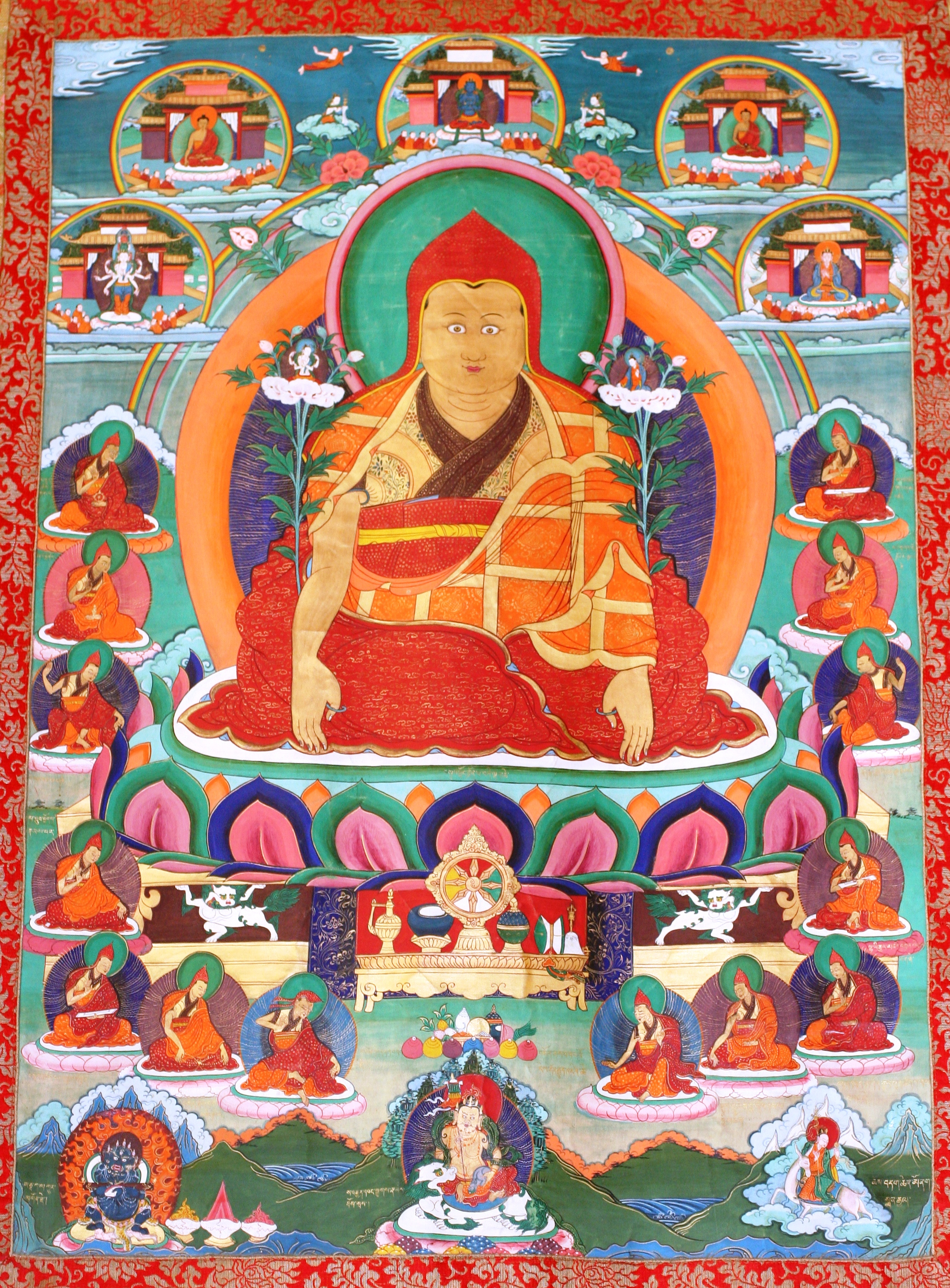
Thangkha of Dolpopa Sherab Gyaltsen

Some of the main promoters of Kālacakra in Tibet were scholar-yogis of the Jonang school, such as Dolpopa Sherab Gyaltsen (1292–1361) and Tāranātha (1575–1634). In fact, the Jonang tradition specializes in Kālacakra, its practice (especially that of the six vajra yogas), its philosophy and its rituals. This began with the work of Kunpang Thukje Tsöndru (1243–1313) who synthesized seventeen different transmission lineages of the Kālacakra sixfold vajrayoga into the Jonang Kālacakra tradition. Jonang is particularly important in that it has preserved this complete Kālacakra system (which has now entered other schools like Kagyu and Nyingma).

In the 17th century, the government of the 5th Dalai Lama outlawed the Jonang school, closing down or forcibly converting most of its monasteries and banning their writings. The Jonang tradition has survived and is now officially recognized by the Tibetan Government in exile as a fifth school of Tibetan Buddhism. Khenpo Kunga Sherab Rinpoche and Khentrul Rinpoche are contemporary Jonangpa Kālacakra masters.

=== Gelug ===
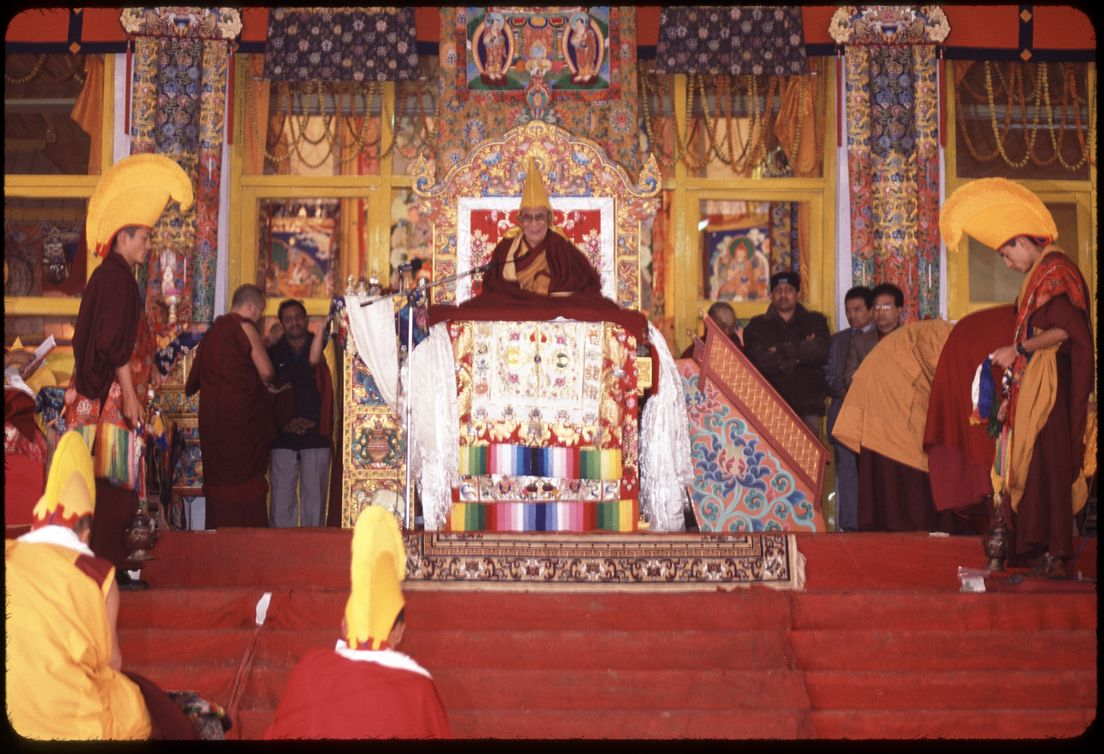
The Dalai Lama presiding over the Kālacakra initiation in Bodh Gaya, India, in January 2003

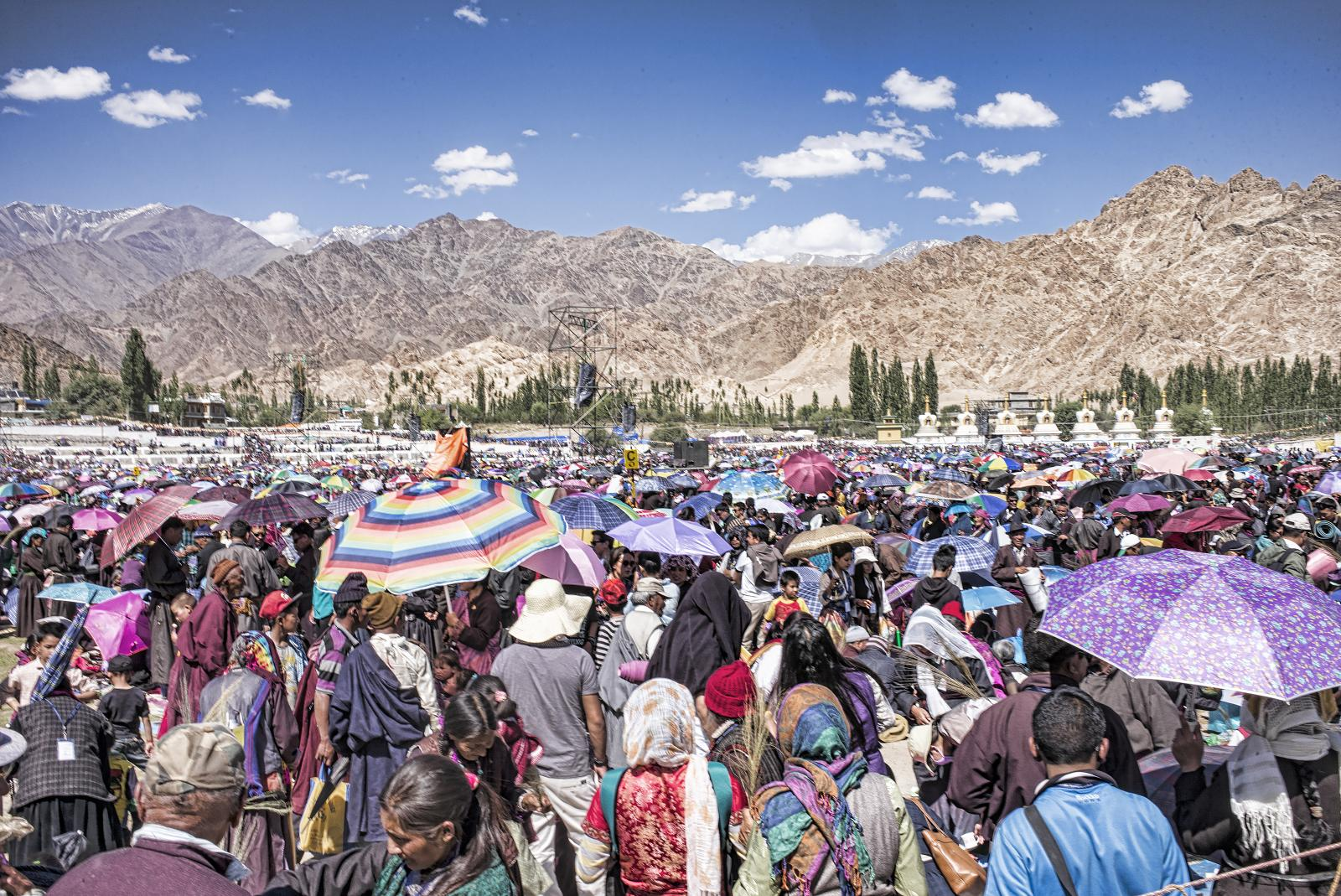
An initiation ceremony in Ladakh, 2014

The Dalai Lamas have had specific interest in the Kālacakra practice, particularly the First, Second, Seventh, Eighth, and the current (Fourteenth) Dalai Lamas. The present Dalai Lama has given over thirty Kālacakra initiations all over the world, and is the most prominent Kālacakra lineage holder alive today. Billed as the "Kālacakra for World Peace," they draw tens of thousands of people. Generally, it is unusual for tantric initiations to be given to large public assemblages, but the Kālacakra has always been an exception.

The 14th Dalai Lama's 33rd Kalachakra ceremony was held in Leh, Ladakh, India, from July 3 to July 12, 2014. About 150,000 devotees and 350,000 tourists were expected to participate in the festival.

The Dalai Lama, Kalu Rinpoche, and others have stated that the public exposition of this tantra is necessary in the current degenerate age. The initiation may be received simply as a blessing for the majority of those attending, however, many of the more qualified attendees do take the commitments and subsequently engage in the practice.

Kirti Tsenshab Rinpoche (1926–2006), the 9th Jebtsundamba Khutughtu, Jhado Rinpoche and the late Gen Lamrimpa (d. 2003) were also among prominent Gelugpa Kālacakra masters.

=== Kagyu ===
The Kālacakra tradition practiced in the Karma Kagyu and Shangpa Kagyu schools is derived from the Jonang tradition and was largely systematized by Jamgon Kongtrul, who wrote the text that is now used for empowerment. The 2nd and 3rd Jamgon Kongtrul (1954–1992) were also prominent Kālacakra lineage holders, with the 3rd Jamgon Kongtrul giving the initiation publicly in North America on at least one occasion (Toronto 1990).

The chief Kālacakra lineage holder for the Kagyu lineage was Kalu Rinpoche (1905–1990), who gave the initiation several times in Tibet, India, Europe and North America (e.g., New York 1982). Upon his death, this mantle was assumed by his heart son, Bokar Tulku Rinpoche (1940–2004), who in turn passed it on to Khenpo Lodro Donyo Rinpoche. Bokar Monastery, of which Donyo Rinpoche is now the head, features a Kālacakra stupa and is a prominent retreat center for Kālacakra practice in the Kagyu lineage.

Tenga Rinpoche was also a prominent Kagyu holder of the Kālacakra; he gave the initiation in Grabnik, Poland in August, 2005. Lopon Tsechu performed Kālacakra initiations and build Kālacakra stupa in Karma Guen buddhist center in southern Spain. Another prominent Kālacakra master is the Second Beru Khyentse.

Chögyam Trungpa, while not a noted Kālacakra master, became increasingly involved later in his life with what he termed Shambhala teachings, derived in part from the Kālacakra tradition, in particular, the mind terma which he received from the Kalki.

=== Nyingma ===
Among the prominent recent and contemporary Nyingma Kālacakra masters are Dzongsar Khyentse Chökyi Lodrö (1894–1959), Dilgo Khyentse (1910–1991), and Penor Rinpoche (1932–2009). An important Nyingma/Shambhala Buddhist Kālacakra lineage holder alive today is Sakyong Mipham.

=== Sakya ===
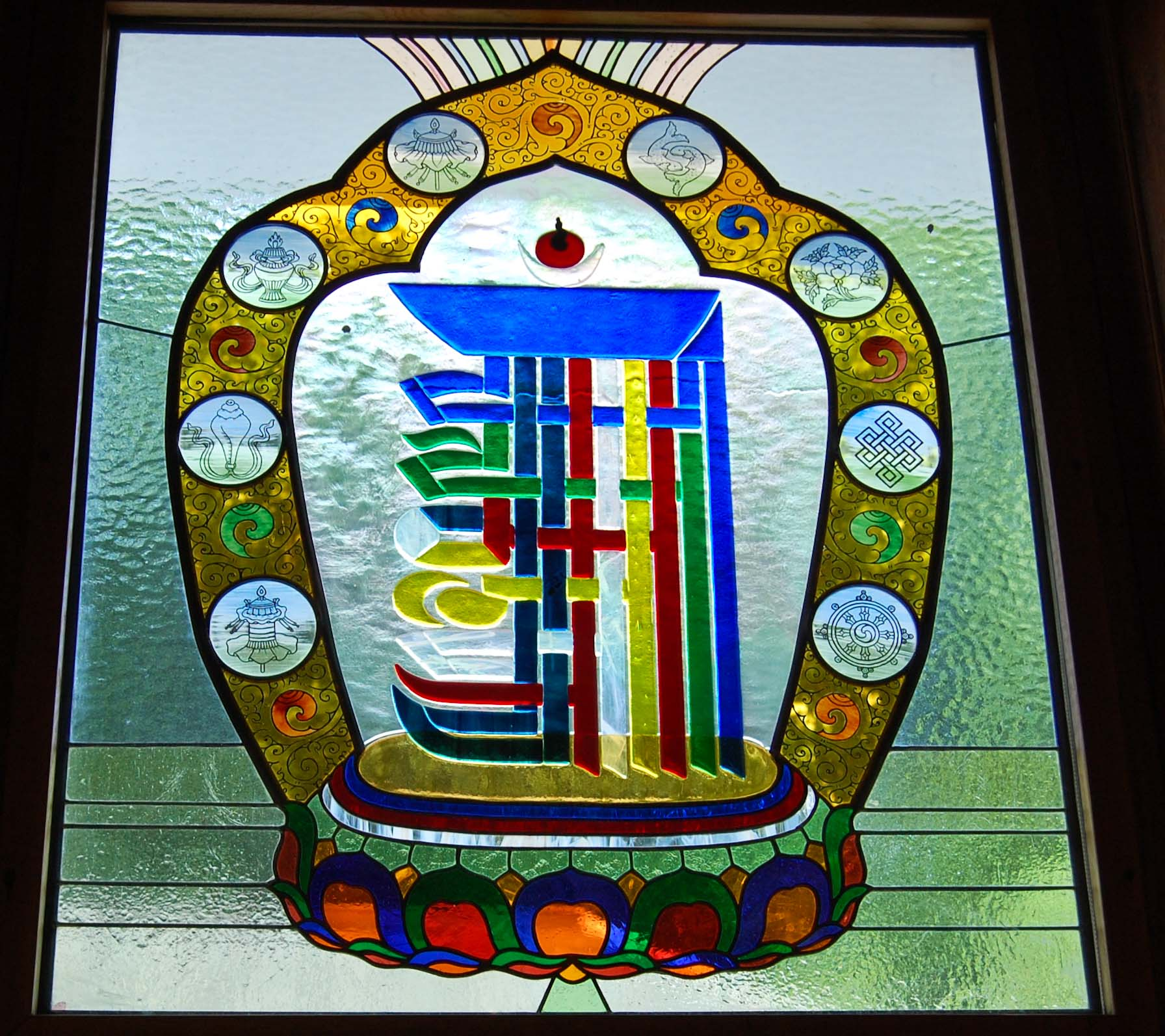
Kālacakra Tenfold Powerful symbol in stained glass

Sakya Trizin, the present head of the Sakya lineage, has given the Kālacakra initiation many times and is a recognized master of the practice.

The Sakya master H.E. Chogye Trichen Rinpoche is one of the main holders of the Kālacakra teachings. Chogye Rinpoche is the head of the Tsharpa School, one of the three main schools of the Sakya tradition of Tibetan Buddhism. Chogye Trichen Rinpoche is the holder of six different Kālacakra initiations, four of which, the Bulug, Jonang, Maitri-gyatsha, and Domjung, are contained within the Gyude Kuntu, the Collection of Tantras compiled by Jamyang Khyentse Wangpo and his disciple Loter Wangpo. Rinpoche has offered all six of these empowerments to Sakya Trizin, the head of the Sakya School of Tibetan Buddhism. Rinpoche has given the Kālacakra initiation in Tibet, Mustang, Kathmandu, Malaysia, the United States, Taiwan, and Spain, and is widely regarded as a definitive authority on Kālacakra. In 1988 he traveled to the United States, giving the initiation and complete instructions in the practice of the six-branch Vajrayoga of Kālacakra according to the Jonangpa tradition in Boston.

== Iconography ==
Tantric iconography including sharp weapons, shields, and corpses similarly appears in conflict with those tenets of non-violence but instead represent the transmutation of aggression into a method for overcoming illusion and ego. Both Kālacakra and his dharmapala protector Vajravega hold a sword and shield in their paired second right and left hands. This is an expression of the Buddha's triumph over the attack of Mara and his protection of all sentient beings. Symbolism researcher Robert Beer writes the following about tantric iconography of weapons and mentions the charnel ground:

Many of these weapons and implements have their origins in the wrathful arena of the battlefield and the funereal realm of the charnel grounds. As primal images of destruction, slaughter, sacrifice, and necromancy these weapons were wrested from the hands of the evil and turned – as symbols – against the ultimate root of evil, the self-cherishing conceptual identity that gives rise to the five poisons of ignorance, desire, hatred, pride, and jealousy. In the hands of siddhas, dakinis, wrathful and semi-wrathful yidam deities, protective deities or dharmapalas these implements became pure symbols, weapons of transformation, and an expression of the deities' wrathful compassion which mercilessly destroys the manifold illusions of the inflated human ego.

== See also ==
- Chakravartin
- Horology
- Lodrö Chökyong
- Kalachakra stupa
- Kalki
- Kings of Shambhala
- Shambhala Buddhism
- Shambhala
- Tibetan calendar

== Sources ==
- ed, by Edward A. Arnold on behalf of Namgyal Monastery Institute of Buddhist Studies, fore. by Robert A. F. Thurman. As Long As Space Endures: Essays on the Kalacakra Tantra in Honor of the Dalai Lama Snow Lion Publications, 2009.
- Berzin, A. Taking the Kalachakra Initiation, Snow Lion Publications, 1997, ISBN 1-55939-084-0 (available in German, French, Italian, Russian)
- Brauen, M. Das Mandala, Dumont, ISBN 3-7701-2509-6 (also available in English, Italian, Dutch and other languages)
- Bryant, B. The Wheel of Time Sand Mandala, Snow Lion Publications, 1995
- Dalai Lama, Hopkins J. The Kalachakra Tantra, Rite of Initiation Wisdom, 1985
- Dhargyey, N. et al. Kalachakra Tantra Motilal Barnassidas
- Henning, Edward (2007). Kalacakra and the Tibetan Calendar. Treasury of the Buddhist Sciences. NY: Columbia University Press. p. 408. ISBN 978-0-9753734-9-1.
- Khedrup Norsang Gyatso; Kilty, Gavin (translator) (2004). Jinpa, Thupten (ed.). Ornament of Stainless Light: An Exposition of the Kālacakra Tantra. The Library of Tibetan Classics. Wisdom Publications. p. 736. ISBN 0-86171-452-0.
- Kumar, Niraj. "The Kalacakra Tantra Vol.I. Translation, Annotation and Commentary"( DK Printworld 2022)
- Kumar, Niraj. "The Kalacakra Tantra Vol.II. Translation, Annotation and Commentary"( DK Printworld 2025)
- Gen Lamrimpa and B. Allan Wallace Transcending Time, an Explanation of the Kalachakra Six-Session Guru Yoga (Wisdom 1999)
- Haas, Ernst and Minke, Gisela. (1976). "The Kālacakra Initiation." The Tibet Journal. Vol. 1, Nos. 3 & 4. Autumn 1976, pp. 29–31.
- Mullin, G.H. The Practice of Kalachakra Snow Lion Publications, 1991
- Namgyal Monastery Kalachakra, Tibet Domani 1999
- Newman, J.R. The Outer Wheel of Time: Vajrayana Buddhist cosmology in the Kalacakra tantra, a dissertation 1987, dissertation. UMI number 8723348.
- Reigle, D. Kalacakra Sadhana and Social ResponsibilitySpirit of the Sun Publications 1996
- Tomlin, A The Chariot that Transports to the Four Kayas: Stages of Meditation on the Glorious Kalacakra by Bamda Gelek Gyatso. Library of Tibetan Works and Archives, 2019.
- Wallace, V.A. (2001). The Inner Kalacakratantra: A Buddhist Tantric View of the Individual. Oxford University Press.
- Wallace, Thurman, Yarnall Kalacakratantra: The Chapter On The Individual Together With The Vimalaprabha American Institute of Buddhist Studies, 2004
