= Suchandra =

According to Indian and Tibetan legend, King Suchandra (Tib. Dawa Sangpo) of the northeastern Indian Kingdom of Shambhala was the one who requested teaching from the Buddha that would allow him to practice the dharma without renouncing his worldly enjoyments and responsibilities. In response to his request, the Buddha gave the first Kalachakra tantra initiation and teachings at Amaravati, a small town in Andhra Pradesh in southeastern India, supposedly emanating at the same time he was also delivering the Prajñā-Pāramitā Sūtras at Vulture Peak Mountain at Rajgir in North India. Along with King Suchandra, 96 minor kings and emissaries from Shambhala are also said to have received the teachings.

Suchandra is considered to be an emanation of Vajrapani, and a bodhisattva on the 10th ground. By practicing the Kalachakra, the whole of Shambhala became an enlightened society, with Suchandra as the ruler. King Suchandra wrote down the Kalachakra teachings he received, composing the 12,000-verse "Mula" or root text, which has not survived. He also built a huge three-dimensional Kalachakra mandala in the center of the kingdom. Suchandra is said to have died only two years after receiving the teachings. The six kings who followed him were known as "dharmarajas" or "truth kings," and each is said to have reigned for over 100 years. The twenty-five rulers that follow them are known as Kalki kings.

== Tāranātha's version ==
From the website www.kalachakra.org (by Kalachakra scholar Edward Smith):

″The following is taken from "dpal dus kyi 'khor lo'i chos bskor gyi byung khungs nyer mkho", by Tāranātha:

On the full moon of the month Caitra in the year following his enlightenment, at the great stupa of Dhānyakaṭaka (dpal ldan 'bras dpung kyi mchod rten), the Buddha emanated the mandala of "The Glorious Lunar Mansions". In front of an audience of countless Buddhas, Bodhisattvas, vīras, ḍākinīs, the twelve great gods, gods, nāgas, yakṣas, spirits and fortunate people gathered from the 960 million villages north of the river Śītā, was requested by the emanation of Vajrapani, the king Sucandra (zla ba bzang po), to teach the tantra.

He taught not just this tantra, but all tantras. Countless men and non-humans achieved the realisations of their desires. Some teachings were taken to other human realms, and the Dharma king Sucandra wrote the Tantras in textual form in his land of Sambhala. He composed the explanatory Tantra in 60,000 verses to the Mūlatantra of 12,000. (Both of these are now lost.)

He had divine workers construct from jewels a maṇḍala palace of Kālacakra, 400 cubits across. He taught the mantrayāna to many humans and many of them achieved the highest realisation. In the second year after the teaching of the Mūlatantra, having installed as regent his son, the emanation of Kṣitigarbha, Sureshvara (lha'i dbang po), he passed on.

After him came other emanations of tenth level Bodhisattvas: Sureśvara (lha dbang), Tejī (gzi brjid can), Somadatta (zla bas byin), Sureśvara (lha'i dbang phyug), Viśvamūrti (sna tshogs gzugs) and Sureśāna (lha'i dbang ldan). They also spread the teachings as did Sucandra.″

== See also ==
- Kings of Shambhala
