= Montecollum, New South Wales =

Montecollum New South Wales
- Coordinates: 28°35′20″S 153°27′51″E
- Population: 54 (2016 census)
- Postcode(s): 2482
- LGA(s): Byron Shire
- State electorate(s): Ballina
- Federal division(s): Richmond

Montecollum is a small town located in the Northern Rivers region of New South Wales. It sits within the Byron Shire local government area and is approximately 22 kilometres (14 mi) from the regional centre of Byron Bay.

It is on the lands of the Arakwal of the Bundjalung nation, who are its traditional owners.

The major tourist attraction in the town is the Crystal Castle and Shambhala Gardens.

== Origin of place name ==
The origin of the name Montecollum is unclear and it is likely to have been named one of three ways: the combination of two Latin words 'monte' meaning mountain and 'columna' meaning high; after a kind of feldspar; or use of the place name 'munggulam' from the Bundjalung language.
