= Vimalaprabha =

11th-century Tibetan Buddhist text in the Kalachakra tantra tradition

Vimalaprabhā is a Sanskrit word that means "The Radiance of Purity", or "Drimé Ö" (Tibetan: དྲི་མེད་འོད།, Wylie: dri med ‘od). This 11th-century Tibetan Buddhist text is a commentary to the Kālacakra Tantra. The Vimalaprabhā is attributed to Shambhala King Pundarika (Tibetan: Pad ma dkar po). It is composed in Sanskrit and consists of 12,000 lines of text. Manuscripts of the work have survived in the libraries of Tibetan monasteries and Indian libraries.

The Vimalaprabhā commentary, together with the Laghutantra, form the basis of the Kālacakra practice as it is currently known and practiced in Tibetan Buddhism, as part of the Vajrayana practices. It is one of the three major commentaries on Kālacakra system, along with Hevajrapindarthatika and Laksabhidhana duddhrta laghutantra pindartha vivarana nama.

== History and date ==
According to John Newman, the Vimalaprabhā mentions an event in the year "403" in Tibetan number symbols stating it to be the "year of the lord of the barbarians". This combined by the text's statement that "Muhammad is the incarnation of al-Rahman" and the teacher of the barbarian dharma (religion), states Newman, suggests that the 403 year must be in the era of Hijra, or equal 1012-1013 CE. This supports the dating of this text to about 1027 CE by Tibetan and Western scholars.

== The Vimalaprabhā and other religious traditions ==
The text criticizes Shaiva tantric tradition as ineffective, states Vesna Wallace, stating that the Shaiva method leads to a "few limited Siddhis" and that the consciousness of its followers "does not make them Shiva like". The Vimalaprabhā states that the knowledge of Buddha dharma is essential before the successful teaching of tantra, and one who does not know the path of the Buddha "teaches the evil path".

According to Johan Elverskog, the Vimalaprabhā provides evidence that the Buddhists who composed this text, along with the Kālacakra Tantra, were aware of the Islamic theology and the core differences between the precepts and premises of Muslims and Buddhists by the 11th-century. The differences were deemed so significant that the text refers to Muslims as barbarians. In other sections it calls Muslims as enemies or mlecchas, assertions that have led scholars to date the text after the 10th-century Islamic invasions of regions inhabited by Buddhist monks.

== The Vimalaprabhā as early testimony for Haṭhayoga ==
Verse 4.119 of the Vimalaprabhā offers one of the earliest known definitions of the term "Haṭhayoga". The Vimalaprabhā mentions, says James Mallinson, that Hatha yoga brings about an "unchanging moment through the practice of nāda by forcefully making the breath enter the central channel and through restraining the bindu of the bodhicitta in the vajra of the lotus of wisdom". What is striking about this passage is that it uses several Mahāyāna Buddhist keywords.
