= Kalachakra stupa =

Type of stupa in Buddhism

In Buddhism, a Kalachakra stupa is a stupa whose symbolism is not connected to events in the Buddha's life, but instead to the symbolism of the Kalachakra Tantra, created to protect against negative energies. It is the rarest kind of stupa.

== Symbolism ==
The specific symbolism of the Kalachakra stupa refers both to the symbolism of a stupa and the Buddhist conception of the universe, described in the Kalachakra teachings.

Stupas express the nature of mind in a perfect way. It symbolizes both enlightened state of the Buddha with body, speech and mind, the ten Bodhisattva levels, as well as the universe: It shows harmony and perfection of all universal principles. There are 8 different types of stupas in the sutras, all referring to important events in the Buddhas life. A ninth stupa, the Kalachakra stupa, can be found among the highest teaching of the Buddha in the non-dual Maha-Anuttarayoga tantra, also known as the “Wheel of Time” or Kalachakra.

The Kalachakra Tantra refers to external, internal and alternative aspects. The external aspects deals with cosmology, astronomy and astrology, the internal deals with the individuals inner energy-system; the interrelationship between body and mind. The alternative aspect meditation deity practice on the Kalachakra. The stupa has great protective power.

== Kalachakra stupas in the world ==
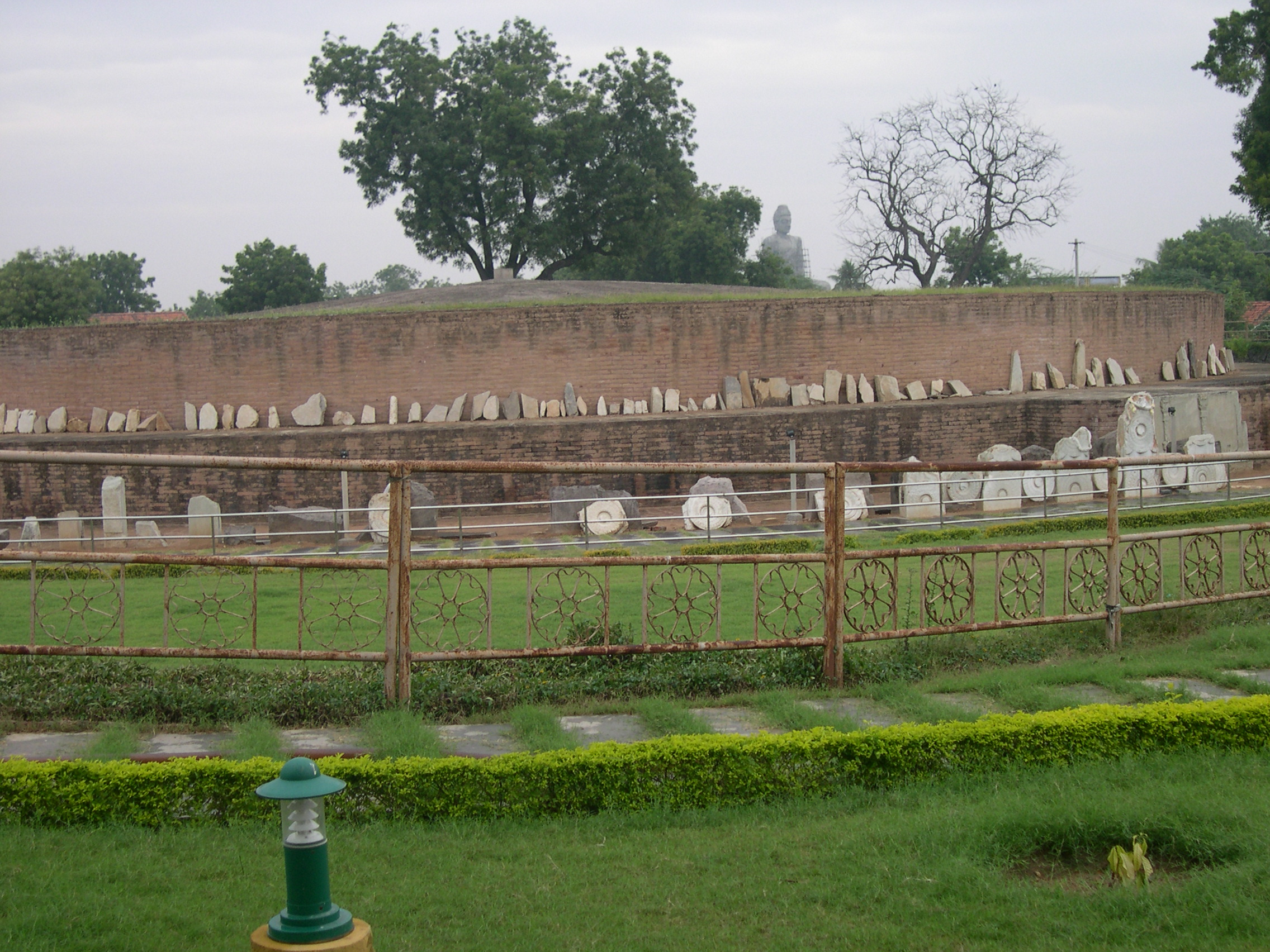
The ancient Dhanyakataka Stupa at Amaravati, Andhra Pradesh, India

=== Ancient Dhanyakataka Stupa at Amaravati, Guntur district, India ===
This is the oldest of all Kalachakra Stupas and the place where according to Vajrayana oral transmission the Kalachakra tantra was first revealed by the historical Buddha. The stupa is not intact, however, there is a nearby museum with a smaller replica of the original Dhanyakataka Stupa. The museum also features some of the original stele and marble carvings from the original Stupa.According to Vajrayana traditional sources the Buddha taught Dharma at Dhanyakataka and conferred the Kalachakra ceremony on selected disciples, which would take the antiquity of the Amaravati Stupa back to 500 BCE. Taranatha, the Buddhist monk writes: "On the full moon of the month Caitra in the year following his enlightenment, at the great stupa of Dhanyakataka, Buddha manifested the mandala of "The Glorious Lunar Mansions" (Kalachakra) at Dhanyakataka. In Vajrayana Tantrism, Dhanyakataka (Amaravati) is considered a very important place in regard to the revelation of the Kalachakra tantra.

=== Stupa in Bokar Monastery, Mirik, India, 1988 ===
This Kalachakra stupa at Bokar Monastery was built in 1988. The monastery is both Karma and Shangpa Kagyu. Inside the stupa are relics of Buddhas and Bodhisattvas, mantras and sacred objects. Mandalas of specific deities are placed inside the different levels of the stupa.

=== Stupa in Eastern Tibet ===
There is a Kalachakra stupa near the border of the old Tibet, built to protect against negative energies from outside the country. This stupa gave the inspiration for building the Kalachakra stupa in southern Spain.

=== Stupa in Karma Guen, Spain, 1994 ===
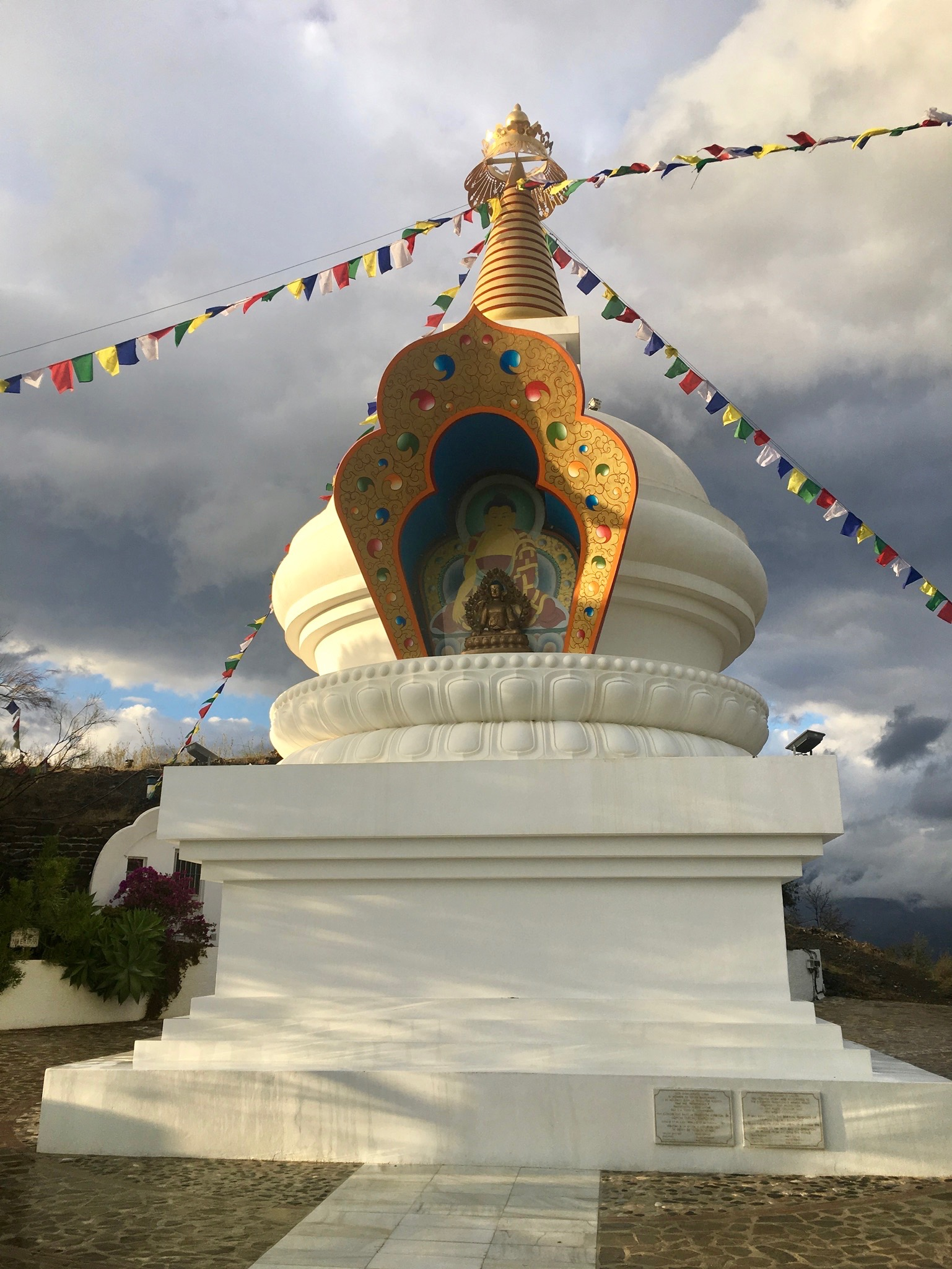
The Kalachakra Stupa in Karma Guen, Spain

This stupa was built in 1994 under guidance of Lopon Tsechu Rinpoche, in the south of Spain. It was the first stupa assisted by Tsechu Rinpoche, a stupa he considered to be the “Mother stupa”, for the other stupas in the west. It is located in a Diamond Way Buddhist (Karma Kagyu) centre, and designed by Woitek Kossowski, who was the architect of the project. It was constructed in the period from July 18 to September 12, 1994. It is 13 meters high and covers a ground area of 49 square meters. Inside it are relics from the present and former Buddhas, the complete Kanjur and Tanjur (all Buddhas teachings and commentaries). At the time it was built, it was only the third of its kind in the world. This stupa has eyes painted on it, a Nepalese custom also seen on the famous Boudhanath stupa in Kathmandu.

=== Stupa in Dharamsala, India ===
This stupa is located at the residence of the Dalai Lama in Dharamsala, India. It was built just before the stupa in Garanas, Austria.

=== Stupa in Garanas, Austria, 2002 ===
The stupa was built on the ground of the Kalachakra Kalapa Centre in southwest Styria, Austria. It is an exact copy of the stupa built at the residence of the Dalai Lama in Dharamsala, India. The stupa was constructed by Geshe Tenzin Dhargye, from December 2000 to October 2002. Ngawang Lodoe, from the monastery of the Dalai Lama in Dharamsala, were supervising the construction. Inside is incense, holy scriptures, valuable items of everyday use. The relics were provided by the Dalai Lama, and the venerable representatives of the five Tibetan Buddhist lineages and other important masters.

=== The Kalachakra Stupa at Kurukulla Center, Medford, Massachusetts, 2010 ===
The Kalachakra stupa at Kurukulla Center was built at the suggestion of Lama Zopa Rinpoche, spiritual head of the FPMT, with which Kurukulla Center is affiliated. The project was initiated when Wendy Cook was the director of the Center and completed after Nick Ribush took over from her September 2008. The artistic director was Kurukulla's interpreter, Thubten Damchoe, and the Center's resident teacher, Geshe Tsulga, gave valuable advice. It is based on the ones at Dharamsala and Garanas (above) and Ngawang Lodoe helped with plans and advice.

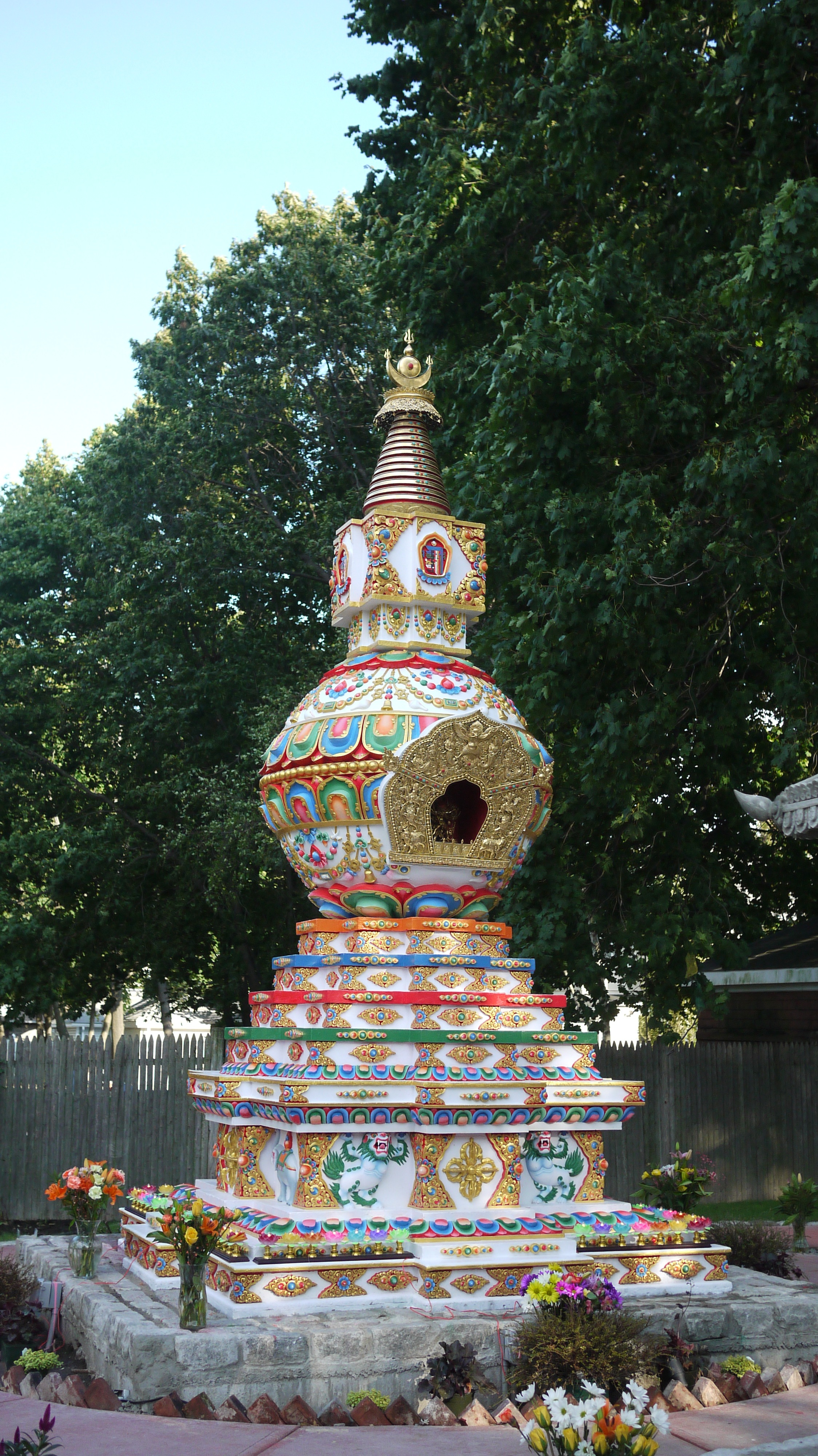
Kalachakra Stupa for World Peace at Kurukulla Center, Medford, Massachusetts

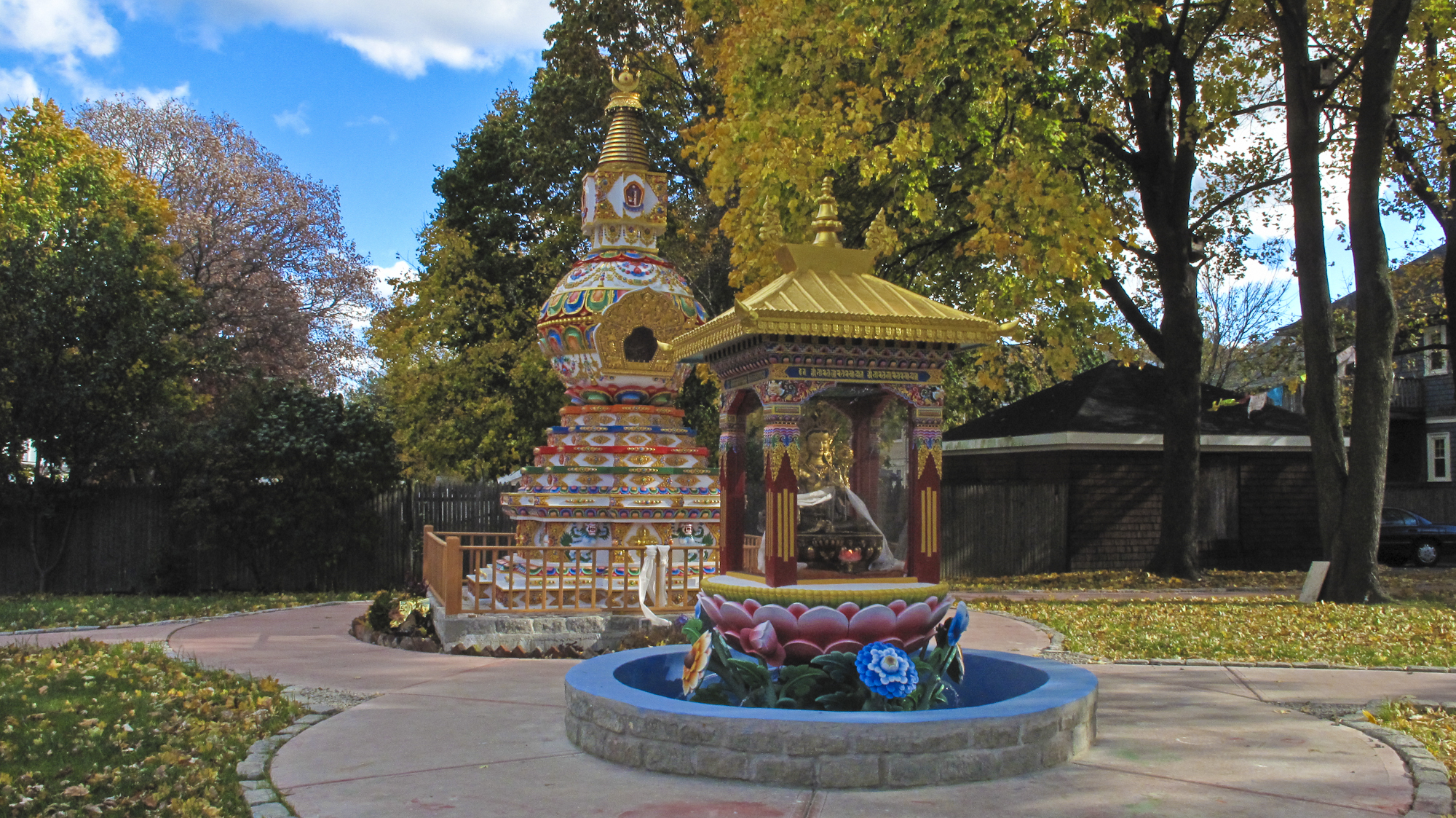
Stupa and Tara Pond

=== The Kalachakra Stupa at Karma Berchen Ling Buddhist Centre, Xylokastro, Greece, 2010 ===
Kalachakra Stupa is a stupa located just outside Lagkadaiika village, in the Xylokastro area of the Corinthia region of southern Greece, overlooking the Gulf of Corinth. It is the largest stupa in Southeastern Europe.

=== Kalachakra Stupa Mullumbimby, New South Wales, Australia 2012 ===
Kalachakra World Peace Stupa was opened to the public at a solemn ceremony at the Crystal Castle, Mullumbimby near Byron Bay in Australia on 27 October 2012. It is the first Kalachakra Stupa in the Southern Hemisphere dedicated to the world peace and Tibetan people

The Stupa at the Crystal Castle is a Kalachakra Stupa, a rare sacred monument created to protect against negative energies. It is known as the World Peace Stupa, and its specific purpose is to restore balance to the earth in times of war, conflict and environmental destruction.

== See also ==
- Benalmádena Stupa
- Buddhist architecture
- Buddhist art
- Buddhist symbolism
- Mankiala
