= Griddharaj Parvat =

Hill in India

- Location within India

Highest point
- Elevation: 717.5 m (2,354 ft)
- Coordinates: 24°18′00″N 81°15′00″E

Griddharaj Parvat, which means "the hill of vultures" (also called Griddhakut Parvat, known locally as Giddhaila Pahar and known in English as Vulture Peak), is a hill of religious, archeological and ecological importance.

It is situated near Devrajnagar village in the tehsil of Ramnagar, in the district of Satna and the state of Madhya Pradesh, in India. It is located 65 km south of Satna and 8 km from Ramnagar town. Its latitude and longitude are 24°18' North and 81°15' East. The altitude of the hill is 717.5 metres (2,354 ft). The hill is situated between the Kaimur Range to the north and the Maikal Hills to the south.

== Rock painting ==
An archaeological survey was conducted at this site by the Department of Archaeology at Awadhesh Pratap University. Dr. Srivastava (Head of the Department of Archaeology), Assistant Professor Govind Singh Dangi, and Research Scholar Rajshekhar Samdariya gathered detailed information regarding Chalcolithic-era rock paintings found here. These rock paintings provide comprehensive insights into the lifestyle, dietary habits, and daily lives of humans from the Chalcolithic period.
