= Chatmonchy discography =

- Studio albums: 7
- Extended plays: 3
- Compilation albums: 2
- Singles: 20
- Video albums: 11
- Music videos: 31

The discography of the Japanese rock band Chatmonchy consists of seven studio albums, two compilation album, three extended plays, twenty singles and thirty-one music videos. On 24 November 2017, Chatmonchy announced that they will be disbanding in July 2018 and their final album, Tanjō is set to be released in June 2018.

== Studio albums ==
Title	Album details	Peak chart positions
Title	Album details	JPN Oricon
Miminari	Released: 5 July 2006; Label: Ki/oon Records; Formats: CD	10
Seimeiryoku	Released: 24 October 2007; Label: Ki/oon; Formats: CD	2
Kokuhaku	Released: 4 March 2009; Label: Ki/oon Records; Formats: CD	2
You More	Released: 6 April 2011; Label: Ki/oon; Formats: CD	4
Henshin	Released: 10 October 2012; Label: Ki/oon; Formats: CD, CD+DVD	2
Kyōmei	Released: 13 May 2015; Label: Ki/oon Records; Formats: CD	8
Tanjō	Released: 27 June 2018; Label: Ki/oon; Formats: CD	13

== Compilation albums ==
Title	Album details	Peak chart positions
Title	Album details	JPN Oricon
Chatmonchy Best 2005-2011	Released: 15 February 2012; Label: Ki/oon	2
Best Monchy 1 -Listening-	Released: 31 October 2018; Label: Ki/oon	6

== Extended plays ==
Title	Album details	Peak chart positions
Title	Album details	JPN Oricon
Chatmonchy ni Naritai	Released: 2004; Label: Independently released	—
Chatmonchy Has Come	Released: 23 November 2005; Label: Ki/oon	49
Awa Come	Released: 27 October 2010; Label: Ki/oon	6
"—" denotes a recording that did not chart or was not released in that territory.

== Singles ==
Title	Year	Peak chart positions	Album
Title	Year	JPN Oricon	Album
"Koi no Kemuri"	2006	34	Miminari
"Renai Spirits"	2006	26	Miminari
"Shangri-La"	2006	6	Seimeiryoku
"Joshi Tachi ni Asu wa Nai"	2007	17	Seimeiryoku
"Tobi Uo no Butterfly/Sekai ga Owaru Yoru ni"	2007	9	Seimeiryoku
"Daidai"	2007	12	Seimeiryoku
"Hira Hira Hiraku Himitsu no Tobira"	2008	11	Kokuhaku
"Kaze Fukeba Koi"	2008	8	Kokuhaku
"Somaruyo"	2008	10	Kokuhaku
"Last Love Letter"	2009	7	Kokuhaku
"Mangetsu ni Hoero"	2012	10	Henshin
"Thermae Roman"	2012	13	Henshin
"Hatena/Yume Mitai da"	2012	18	Henshin
"Kirakira Hikare"	2012	16	Henshin
"Convenience Honeymoon"	2012	23	Henshin
"Kokoro to Atama/Itachigokko"	2014	22	Kyōmei
"Tokimeki/Tonari no Onna"	2015	23	Kyōmei
"Majority Blues/Kienai Hoshi"	2016	41	Best Monchy 1 -Listening-
"Magical Fiction"	2017	33	Best Monchy 1 -Listening-
"Tatta Sakki kara 3000 Nen made no Hanashi"	2018	40	Tanjō

== Videography ==
=== Music videos ===
Year	Title	Director(s)
2005	"Hana no Yume"	Hideaki Fukui
2006	"Koi no Kemuri"	Hideaki Fukui
2006	"Renai Spirits"	Seki★Ryuji
2006	"Shangri-La"	Hideaki Fukui
2007	"Joshi Tachi ni Asu wa Nai"	Tetsuro Takeuchi
2007	"Tobi Uo no Butterfly"	Tetsuro Takeuchi
2007	"Sekai ga Owaru Yoru ni"	Shinpei Uno
2007	"Daidai"	Shuichi Bamba
2008	"Hira Hira Hiraku Himitsu no Tobira"	Hideaki Fukui
2008	"Kaze Fukeba Koi"	Takashi Yamaguchi
2008	"Somaruyo"	Yasuhiko Shimizu
2009	"Last Love Letter"	Hisashi Eto
2010	"Bus Romance"	Shota Sakamoto
2010	"Haru Natsu Aki"	Kasumi Hiraoka
2010	"three sheep"	Shinpei Uno
2010	"Koko Dake no Hanashi"	Yasuhiko Shimizu
2011	"Birthday Cake no Ue wo Aruite Kaetta"	Yuuji Matsumuya/Naoto Nakanishi
2012	"Mangetsu ni Hoero"	Yasuhiko Shimizu
2012	"Thermae Roman"	Hideaki Fukui
2012	"Hatena"	Yasuhiko Shimizu
2012	"Kirakira Hikare"	Kazuaki Seki
2012	"Convenience Honeymoon"	Smith
2014	"Kokoro to Atama"	NuQ
2014	"Itachigokko"	Santa Yamagishi
2015	"Tokimeki"	Yasuhiko Shimizu
2015	"Tonari no Onna"	Tokyosoko
2015	"Kimi ga Sonoki nara"	Hideaki Fukui
2016	"Majority Blues"	MINORxU
2016	"Kienai Hoshi"	Daigo Matsui
2017	"Magical Fiction"	Hideaki Fukui
2018	"Tatta Sakki kara 3000 Nen made no Hanashi"	Yasuhiko Shimizu

=== Video albums ===
Chatmonchy Restaurant Zensai (28 November 2007)
- Chatmonchy Restaurant Zensai (チャットモンチー レストラン 前菜; Chatmonchy Restaurant Appetizer)
1. Hana no Yume (ハナノユメ; A Flower's Dream) / Dir.福井英晃
2. Koi no Kemuri (恋の煙; Smoke of Love) / Dir.福井英晃
3. Renai Supirittsu (恋愛スピリッツ; Love Spirits) /Dir.福井英晃
4. Shangurira (シャングリラ; Shangri-la) / Dir.福井英晃
5. Joshitachi ni Asu wa Nai (女子たちに明日はない; There Is No Tomorrow for the Girls) / Dir.竹内鉄郎
6. Tobiuo no Batafurai (とび魚のバタフライ; The Butterfly of Flying Fish) / Dir.竹内鉄郎
7. Sekai ga Owaru Yoru ni (世界が終わる夜に; The Night the World Ends) / Dir.宇野心平
8. Daidai (橙; Bitter Orange) / Dir.番場秀一
9. Behind-the-scenes footage
Chatmonchy Restaurant Soup (27 February 2008)
- Chatmonchy Restaurant Soup (チャットモンチー レストラン スープ; Chatmonchy Restaurant Soup)

Live show recorded on 7 July 2007 at Hibiya Field Music Hall during the Star Festival.

1. Joshitachi ni Asu wa Nai (女子たちに明日はない; Girls Have No Tomorrow)
2. Hana no Yume (ハナノユメ; A Flower's Dream)
3. Te no Naka no Nokoribi (手の中の残り日; The Rest of the Day in My Hands)
4. Sayonara Good bye (さよならGood bye)
5. Weekend no Maboroshi (ウィークエンドのまぼろし; Weekend Illusion)
6. Tsumasaki (ツマサキ)
7. Basu Romansu (バスロマンス; Bus Romance)
8. Purazuma (プラズマ; Plasma)
9. Owari Naki BGM (終わりなきBGM; Endless BGM)
10. Renai Supirittsu (恋愛スピリッツ; Love Spirits)
11. Donaru, Denwa, Doshaburi (どなる、でんわ、どしゃぶり; Angry Shout, Telephone, Downpour)
12. Tobiuo no Batafurai (とび魚のバタフライ; Flying Fish Butterfly)
13. Ittousei ni Narenakatta Kimi e (一等星になれなかった君へ; To You, Who Wasn't Able to Become a First-Magnitude Star)
14. Hotaru Hotaru (惚たる蛍; Charmed Firefly)
15. Sekai ga Owaru Yoru ni (世界が終わる夜に; The Night the World Ends)
16. Koi no Kemuri (恋の煙; Smoke of Love)
17. Yuge (湯気; Steam)
18. Shangurira (シャングリラ; Shangri-la)

Encore:

1. Kaze (風; Wind)
2. Toukyou Hachimitsu Orchestra (東京ハチミツオーケストラ; Tokyo Honey Orchestra)
Chatmonchy Restaurant Main Dish (5 November 2008)
- Chatmonchy Restaurant Main Dish (チャットモンチー レストラン メインディッシュ; Chatmonchy Restaurant Main Dish)

Two disk live DVD including a show recorded on 1 April 2008 at the Nippon Budokan in Tokyo. The second disk includes footage from shows during the band's Seimeiryoku MINAGIRI Tour (生命力みなぎりTOUR; Vitality Minagiri Tour). A Blu-ray Disc version of the release was announced on 24 December 2008 for release on 4 March 2009.
