= Tokimeki =

Tokimeki is the romanization of the Japanese term ときめき, which can mean "excitement" or "heartbeat". It can refer to:

- Tokimeki Tonight, an animanga series that began in 1982
- Tokimeki Alice, a manga by Hideo Azuma that ran from 1985 to 2006
- Nakayama Miho no Tokimeki High School, a 1987 dating sim
- Tokimeki Memorial (video game), the first of a dating sim series that began in 1994
- Tokimeki Couple, a 1996 manga series by Mariko Kubota produced in Manga Life
- Sailor Moon Sailor Stars Tokimeki Party, a 1997 release by Sega Pico
- "Tokimeki", a December 1999 comedic song by Missalina Rei produced by Key Party Records and released by Enamell Records
- Tokimeki Momoiro High School, a May 2002 manga series by Chiharu Sasano (also in Manga Life)
- Tokimeki Midnight, a December 2002 retelling of Tokimeki Tonight
- "Tokimeki DREAMing!!!", a 2008 song in "Shokugyō: Idol"
- "Tokimeki no Rumba", an August 2009 single released by singer Kiyoshi Hikawa
- Kaitō Tenshi Twin Angel: Tokimeki Paradise!!, a 2011 anime adaptation of a 2007 manga
- Tokimeki Crisis, a video game of the TV series Kamen Rider Ex-Aid
- Tokimeki/Tonari no Onna, is a 2015 double A-side single by Chatmonchy
- "Made in Tokimeki", the ending song by the unit Ra*bits from the franchise Ensemble Stars!
- "Tokimeki Runners", the first song sung by the unit Nijigasaki High School Idol Club from the franchise Love Live!
