= Dongsong =

Dongsong may refer to these places in China:

- Dongsong, Henan (东宋), a town in Luoning County, Henan
- Dongsong Township (洞松乡), a township in Xiangcheng County, Sichuan
