= Kokuhaku =

Kokuhaku may refer to:

- "Kokuhaku" (Idoling!!! song), 2008
- "Kokuhaku" (Angela Aki song), 2012
- Kokuhaku (album), a 2010 album by Chatmonchy
- Confessions (2010 film) or Kokuhaku, a Japanese drama film
- Confessions (Minato novel), 2008 novel by Kanae Minato
