= Shambhala (disambiguation) =

Shambhala or Shambala is a mythical kingdom in Tibetan Buddhism.

Shambala may also refer to:

== In Buddhism ==
- Shambhala Buddhism, a Buddhist lineage named by Sakyong Mipham Rinpoche
  - Shambhala School, a non-denominational private school in Halifax, Nova Scotia
  - Shambhala Training, a secular approach to meditation developed by Chogyam Trungpa
- Shambhala Publications, a publishing company that has no affiliation with Shambhala Buddhism, which specializes in books that deal with Buddhism or related topics

== Media and entertainment ==
- Shambhala (2024 film), a Nepalese film
- Shambhala (2012 film), a Thai film
- Shambhala (music festival), a Canadian music festival
- Shambhala Publications, an American publisher
- "Shambala", a song by Beastie Boys from their 1994 album Ill Communication
- Shambhala, a mythical location in the video game Fire Emblem: Three Houses
- Shambhala, a mythical location in the video game Uncharted 2: Among Thieves
- Shambala (film), a 2021 Kyrgyz submission for the Academy Award for Best International Feature Film
- "Shambala" (song), a 1973 song by Daniel Moore
- Shambala Festival, a UK festival
- Shambhala (roller coaster), a roller coaster at PortAventura World in Spain
- Shamballa: Duets with Thurston Moore and Elliott Sharp, a 1993 album by William Hooker (musician)

== Places, peoples and languages ==
- Shambala, Xiangcheng County, Sichuan, China
- Shambaa people, a people of Tanzania, sometimes known as "Shambala"
- Shambala language, a separate Tanzanian language

== Other ==
- Shamballa, the dwelling place of the governing deity of Earth, Sanatkumara, and his attendants
- Shambhala Preserve, an animal refuge founded by actress Tippi Hedren
- Shambhala: Expedición al Himalaya, a roller coaster at PortAventura Park
- Sambhal, city in Uttar Pradesh, India, origin of the Shambala concept
  - Sambhal district
  - Sambhal (Lok Sabha constituency), Indian parliamentary constituency
  - Sambhal (Vidhan Sabha constituency), state assembly constituency

== See also ==
- Shambu (disambiguation)
- Shangri-La (disambiguation)
- Abdul Khaliq Sambhali (1950–2021), Indian Muslim scholar and writer
- Burhanuddin Sambhali (1938–2020), Indian Islamic scholar, teacher and jurist
- Ishaq Sambhali, Indian politician, freedom activist and journalist
