= Dingzhai =

Village in Henan, People's Republic of China

Dingzhai 丁寨村
- County
- Country: People's Republic of China
- Province: Henan
- Prefecture-level city: Luoyang
- County: Luoning
- Town: Dongsong
- Time zone: UTC+8 (China Standard)

Dongzhai (Chinese: 丁寨村) is a village in the west of Henan province, China. It is under the administration of Dongsong town, in Luoning County, Luoyang. Road building and clean water projects were started in Dingzhai in the late 2010s.
