= Kumiko Takahashi =

Kumiko Takahashi may refer to:

- Kumiko Takahashi (writer) (高橋 久美子, born 1982), Japanese writer
- Kumiko Takahashi (animator) (高橋 久美子), Japanese animator and character designer
- Kumiko Takahashi (singer) (高橋 久美子, born 1954), Japanese singer
