= Shangri-La (disambiguation) =

Shangri-La is a fictional valley in the 1933 novel Lost Horizon by James Hilton.

Shangri-La may also refer to:

== Buildings ==
- Shangri La (Doris Duke), a mansion built by Doris Duke outside Honolulu, Hawaii
- Shangri-La (house), a Denver, Colorado, mansion built by Harry E. Huffman
- Hotel Shangri-La, a hotel in Santa Monica, California
- Living Shangri-La, a skyscraper in Vancouver
- The St. Francis Shangri-La Place, a condominium in Mandaluyong, Philippines
- Shangri-La Hotels and Resorts
  - Edsa Shangri-La, Manila, Mandaluyong, Philippines
  - Makati Shangri-La, Manila, Makati, Philippines
  - Shangrila Resort, on Lower Kachura Lake, Skardu, Gilgit−Baltistan, Pakistan
  - Shangri-La Hotel (Dubai), a hotel on the Sheikh Zayed Road, Dubai
  - Shangri-La Hotel Singapore
  - Shangri-La Colombo, Sri Lanka
  - Shangri-La Plaza, the retail arm of the Kuok group
  - Shangri-La Toronto, a hotel/condominium under construction in Toronto

== Music ==
- The Shangri-Las, an American girl group of the 1960s

=== Albums ===
- Shangri-La, a 2008 album by BeForU
- Shangri-La (The Blackeyed Susans album) (2003)
- Shangri-La (Edenbridge album) (2022)
- Shangri-La (Elkie Brooks album) (2003)
- Shangri La (Jake Bugg album) (2013)
- Shangri-La (Mark Knopfler album) (2004)
- Shangri-La (Mucc album) (2012)
- Shangri'la (Rubettes album) (1992)
- Shangri-La (Sonny Stitt album) (1964)
- Shangri-La (EP), by VIXX (2017) or the title track
- Shangri-La (Wang Leehom album) (2004)
- Shangri-La (Yacht album) (2011)
- Shangri-La, by Bardeux (1990)
- Shangri-La, by Jackie Chan (1986)

=== Songs ===
- "Shangri-La", by Sylvie Kreusch, 2021
- "Shangri-La" (1946 song), popularized by The Four Coins in 1957 and The Lettermen in 1969
- "Shangri-La" (Chatmonchy song), 2006
- "Shangri-La", a 1997 song by Denki Groove
- "Shangri-La" (Gerard Joling song), the Dutch entry to the Eurovision Song Contest 1988
- "Shangri-La" (The Kinks song), 1969
- "Shangri-La", by EOB from the album Earth, 2020
- "Shangri La", by A*Teens from the album New Arrival
- "Shangri La", by Angela and the opening theme of the anime series Fafner in the Azure
- "Shangri-La", by Lola Blanc
- "Shangri-La", by Digitalism from the album Mirage
- "Shangri-La", by Electric Light Orchestra from A New World Record
- "Shangri-La", by Gotthard from Need to Believe
- “Shangri-La”, by Teena Marie from the album Emerald City
- "Shangri La", by Roman Grey
- "Shangri-La", by Don Henley from The End of the Innocence
- "Shangrila", by Billy Idol from Cyberpunk, 1993
- "Shangri-La", by The Rutles from The Rutles Archaeology
- "Shangri-La", by Steve Miller Band from Italian X Rays
- "Shangri-La", by Versus, from the album Hurrah and the Shangri-La EP
- "Shangri-La", by Kim Wilde from the album Teases & Dares
- "Shangri-La", by Diaura from the album Versus
- "Shangri-La", by Asami Imai as the opening theme of the 2008 video game Corpse Party
- "Shangri-La", by Mac Miller from the posthumous album Balloonerism
- "Shangri-La", by Donald Byrd from album Royal Flush

=== Record labels ===
- Shangri-La Music, a Santa Monica-based record label
- Shangri-La Records, a Memphis-based record label

== Other media ==
- Shangri-La (film), a 2002 film by Takashi Miike
- Shangri-La (musical), a 1956 musical stage adaptation of the Hilton novel
- Shangri-La (novel), a 2009 Japanese novel adapted into a manga and an anime series
- Shangri-La Frontier, a 2020 web novel adapted into a manga
- Shangri-La Plaza (TV pilot), an American musical-comedy pilot
- Lost in Shangri-La, a 2011 non-fiction book by Mitchell Zuckoff
- The Shangri-La Diet, a 2006 book by Seth Roberts.
- Shangri-La, a map from the zombies mode on Call of Duty: Black Ops
- Shangri-La, a mystical dreamland where players battle demons in Far Cry 4

== Places ==
- Shangrila Lake (شنگریلا جھیل), formally named Lower Kachura Lake (Urdu: زیریں کچورا جھیل), a lake near Skardu in Gilgit−Baltistan, Pakistan
- Shangri-la (Antarctica), a valley in the McMurdo Dry Valleys of Antarctica
- Shangri-La, Yunnan, a county-level city in Yunnan province, China
- Shangri-La (Xianggelila) Town, formerly called Riwa, a town in Daocheng County, Garzê Tibetan Autonomous Prefecture, Sichuan
- Shangri-La Speedway, a former auto racing track in the state of New York (United States)
- Shangri-LA II Speedway, an auto racing track in the state of New York (United States)
- Xangri-lá, a coastal city in Rio Grande do Sul state, Brazil
- Shangrilá, a former seaside resort in Uruguay
- Shangri La Botanical Gardens and Nature Center, a botanical garden in the United States
- Camp David or Shangri-La
- Baliem Valley, a valley in Papua which became famous after the 1945 New Guinea Gremlin Special rescue
- Shangri-La, a popular live music and late-night area located in the south-east corner of the Glastonbury Festival site
- Shangri-La, a 600-acre estate on Roberts Island, Nova-Scotia, once owned by socialite Carlo Amato

== Various uses ==
- Shangri-la (Titan), a region on Saturn's main satellite, Titan
- USS Shangri-La (CV-38), an aircraft carrier of World War II
- Shangri-La Dialogue, an inter-government security forum for Asia-Pacific states
- Shangri-La Entertainment, an American production company
- Shangri-La (recording studio), a recording studio in Malibu, California
  - Shangri-La (miniseries), a 2019 miniseries about the recording studio of the same name

== See also ==
- Shambala (disambiguation)
- Xanadu (disambiguation)
