= Xinghua, Henan =

Xinghua 兴华镇
- Town
- Location in Henan
- Coordinates: 34°15′38″N 111°25′53″E
- Country: People's Republic of China
- Province: Henan
- Prefecture-level city: Luoyang
- County: Luoning
- Village-level divisions: 25 villages
- Elevation: 491 m (1,611 ft)
- Time zone: UTC+8 (China Standard)
- Area code: 0379

Xinghua (simplified Chinese: 兴华; traditional Chinese: 興華; pinyin: Xīnghuá) is a town of Luoning County in western Henan province, China, located 24 kilometres (15 mi) southwest of the county seat. As of 2011, it has 12 villages under its administration.

== See also ==
- List of township-level divisions of Henan
