= Xanadu =

Xanadu most often refers to:

- Shangdu, the summer capital of the Yuan dynasty ruled by Kublai Khan, grandson of Genghis Khan
- A metaphor for opulence or an idyllic place, based upon Samuel Taylor Coleridge's description of Shangdu in his 1816 poem Kubla Khan

Xanadu may also refer to:

== Other places ==
- Xanadu Hills, a range near Ward Valley in Antarctica
- Xanadu (Titan), an enigmatic bright feature on the surface of Saturn's moon Titan
- Xanadu 2.0, the nickname of Bill Gates's house
- Xanadu Beach Resort & Marina, Freeport, Grand Bahama Island, Bahamas
- Xanadu Houses, a series of experimental homes built to showcase computers and automation in the home
- Madrid Xanadú, a large shopping precinct and entertainment centre in Spain
- Meadowlands Xanadu, the original name of the New Jersey mall American Dream

== Art, entertainment, and media ==
=== Film, television, and theatre ===
- Xanadu (Citizen Kane), a mansion in the 1941 film Citizen Kane
- Xanadu (film), 1980, starring Olivia Newton-John
  - Xanadu (musical), a 2007 Broadway musical based on the film
- Xanadu (TV series)
- Xanadu: The Marco Polo Musical, a 1953 Seventh Army musical
- Xanadu, a ballet by Mildred Couper
- Xanadu, a virtual world in "Garage Kids", the pilot of Code Lyoko
- Xanadu, a world in "Ariel", an episode of The Adventures of the Galaxy Rangers
- Xanadu, a fictional hotel which imploded in Ocean's Eleven

=== Music ===
==== Albums ====
- Xanadu (ExWhyZ album) (2023)
- Xanadu (Menudo album) (1981)
- Xanadu (soundtrack), the soundtrack of the film

==== Songs ====
- "The Legend of Xanadu", a hit song by Dave Dee, Dozy, Beaky, Mick & Tich (1968)
- "Xanadu" (Olivia Newton-John and Electric Light Orchestra song) (1980)
- "Xanadu" (Rush song) (1977)
- "Xanadu (A Vision in a Dream)", 2001, by Stormlord from At the Gates of Utopia
- "Xanadu", 2007, by Moi dix Mois from Dixanadu
- "Xanadu", by Screw (2012)
- "Xanadu", by the Party Animals (2003)
- "Xanadu", by The Ghost of a Saber Tooth Tiger (2014)
- "Xanadu", by Ummet Ozcan (2022)
- "Xanadu", by The Winery Dogs (2022)

==== Other uses in music ====
- Xanadu Records, a jazz record label
- "Mona Lisa Overdrive -Xanadu-", a 2003 concert video by Buck-Tick

=== Other media ===
- Xanadu (video game), 1985
- Tokyo Xanadu a 2015 action role-playing game developed by Nihon Falcom
- Faxanadu, a 1987 video game for the NES/Famicom
- Madame Xanadu, a DC comics character
- The home of comics character Mandrake the Magician
- The Xanadu Adventure (2005), a Vesper Holly series novel

== Computing ==
- Project Xanadu, an early non-markup hypertext project by Ted Nelson
- Xanadu Quantum Technologies, a photonic quantum computing company based in Toronto, Canada

== Other uses ==
- Philodendron xanadu, plant in the family Araceae
  - Xanadu, a shade of gray whose name is derived from the Philodendron
- AirAsia X, airline (callsign XANADU)

== See also ==
- Xandu (comics), a fictional character in Marvel comics
- Shanadoo, a Japanese dance and pop girl group
- Shangdu (disambiguation)
- Shangri-La (disambiguation)
