= Shambhala =

Mythical kingdom in Tibetan Buddhist and Hindu tradition

Shambhala (Sanskrit: शम्भल, IAST: Śambhala), also spelled Shambala or Shamballa (Tibetan: བདེ་འབྱུང, Wylie: Bde'byung; Chinese: 香巴拉; pinyin: Xiāngbālā), is a spiritual kingdom in Tibetan Buddhist tradition. Shambhala is mentioned in the Kalachakra Tantra. The Bon scriptures speak of a closely related land called Tagzig Olmo Lung Ring.

The Sanskrit name is taken from the name of a city near the Ganges, sometimes identified with Sambhal in the Indian state of Uttar Pradesh, as mentioned in the Hindu Puranas. The mythological relevance of the place originates with a prophecy in Vishnu Purana (4.24) according to which Shambhala will be the birthplace of Kalki, the next incarnation of Vishnu, who will usher in a new age (Satya Yuga); and the prophesied ruling Kingdom of Maitreya, the future Buddha.

== Kalachakra tantra ==
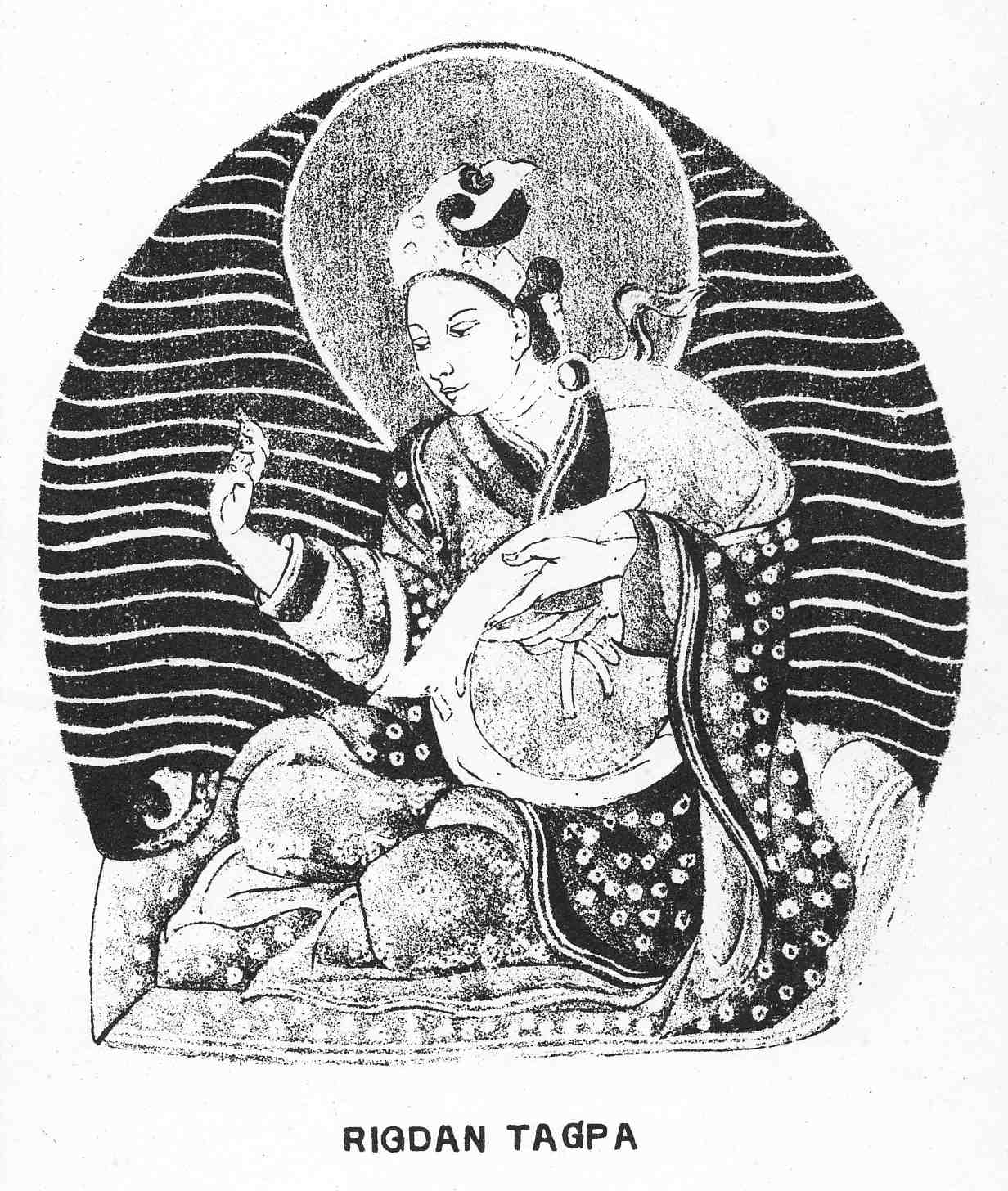
Manjuśrīkīrti, King of Shambhala

Shambhala is ruled by the future Buddha Maitreya. The Shambhala narrative is found in the Kalachakra tantra, a text of the group of the Anuttarayoga Tantras. Kalachakra Buddhism was presumably introduced to Tibet in the 11th century, the epoch of the Tibetan Kalachakra calendar. The oldest known teachers of Kalachakra are Dolpopa Sherab Gyaltsen (d. 1361) and Buton Rinchen Drub (d. 1364).

In the narrative, King Manjuśrīkīrti is said to have been born in 159 BC and ruled over a kingdom of 300,510 followers of the Mlechha religion, some of whom worshiped the Sun. He is said to have expelled 20,000 people from his domain who clung to Surya Samadhi (solar worship) rather than convert to Kalachakra (Wheel of Time) Buddhism. After realizing these were the wisest and best of his people and how much he was in need of them, he later asked them to return, and some did.

Those who did not return are said to have set up the city of Shambhala. Manjuśrīkīrti initiated the preaching of the Kalachakra teachings in order to try to convert those who returned and were still under his rule. In 59 BC he abdicated his throne to his son, Puṇḍārika, and died soon afterward, entering the Sambhogakaya of Buddhahood.

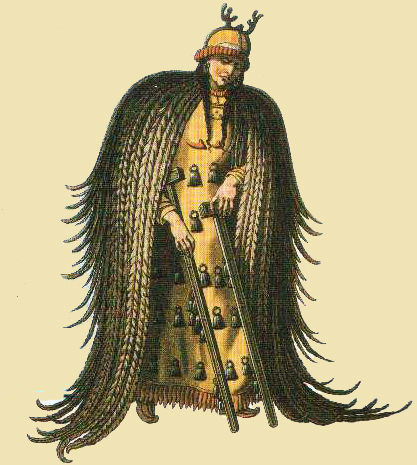
Portrait of an Alti Himalian Shaman. Detail from "A Sorceress from Tungusy" 1812–1813 by: E. Karnejeff

The Kalachakra tantra prophesies that when the world declines into war and greed, and all is lost, the 25th Kalki king Maitreya will emerge from Shambhala, with a huge army to vanquish Dark Forces and usher in a worldwide Golden Age. This final battle is prophesied for the year 2424 or 2425 (in the 3304th year after the death of the Buddha). Thereafter, Buddhism would survive another 1,800 years.

== Western reception ==
Tibet and Tibetan Buddhism were largely unknown in the West prior to the beginning of the 20th century. The name itself, however, was reported as early as the 17th century, by way of Estêvão Cacella, the Portuguese missionary who had heard about Shambhala (transcribed as Xembala), and thought it was another name for Cathay or China. Cacella in 1627 headed to Tashilhunpo, the seat of the Panchen Lama and, discovering his mistake, returned to India.

=== Neo-Theosophy ===
Later esoteric writers further emphasized and elaborated on the concept of a hidden land inhabited by a hidden mystic brotherhood whose members labor for the good of humanity. Alice A. Bailey claims Shamballa (her spelling) is an extra-dimensional or spiritual reality on the astral plane, a spiritual centre where the governing deity of Earth, Sanat Kumara, dwells as the highest Avatar of the Planetary Logos of Earth, and is said to be an expression of the Will of God.

=== Expeditions and location hypotheses ===
Nicholas and Helena Roerich led a 1924–1928 expedition aimed at Shambhala. They also believed that Belukha Mountain in the Altai Mountains was an entrance to Shambhala, a common belief in that region. They led a second expedition to look for Shambhala in Mongolia between 1934 and 1935.

Inspired by Theosophical lore and several visiting Mongol lamas, Gleb Bokii, the chief Bolshevik cryptographer and one of the bosses of the Soviet secret police, along with his writer friend Alexander Barchenko, embarked on a quest for Shambhala, in an attempt to merge Kalachakra-tantra and ideas of Communism in the 1920s. In a secret laboratory affiliated with the secret police, Bokii and Barchenko experimented with Buddhist spiritual techniques to try to find a key for engineering perfect communist human beings.

They contemplated a special expedition to Inner Asia to retrieve the wisdom of Shambhala – the project fell through as a result of intrigues within the Soviet intelligence service, as well as rival efforts of the Soviet Foreign Commissariat that sent its own expedition to Tibet in 1924.

French Buddhist Alexandra David-Néel associated Shambhala with Balkh in present-day Afghanistan, also offering the Persian Sham-i-Bala, "elevated candle" as an etymology of its name. In a similar vein, the Gurdjieffian J. G. Bennett published speculation that Shambalha was Shams-i-Balkh, a Bactrian sun temple.

=== Shangri-La ===
Shambhala may have been the inspiration for Shangri-La, a fictional paradise on Earth, hidden in a Tibetan valley, which features in the 1933 novel Lost Horizon by British author James Hilton.

== See also ==
- Agartha
- Himavanta
- Kingdom of God
- Kumari Kandam
- Lost city
- Sagala
- Shambala (disambiguation)
- Shangri-La
- Kalki 2898 AD

== General and cited references ==
- Allen, Charles. (1999). The Search for Shangri-La: A Journey into Tibetan History. Little, Brown and Company. Reprint: Abacus, London. 2000. ISBN 0-349-11142-1.
- Bernbaum, Edwin. (1980). The Way to Shambhala: A Search for the Mythical Kingdom Beyond the Himalayas. Reprint: (1989) St. Martin's Press, New York. ISBN 0-87477-518-3.
- Berzin, Alexander (2003). Study Buddhism. Mistaken Foreign Myths About Shambhala.
- D'Montford, Dr. S. (2004). Tibetan Buddhist Atrocities and Propaganda. Sydney: Happy Medium Publishing.
- Martin, Dean (1999). "'Ol-mo-lung-ring, the Original Holy Place". Huber, Toni, ed. Sacred Spaces and Powerful Places in Tibetan Culture: A Collection of Essays. pp. 125–153. The Library of Tibetan Works and Archives, Dharamsala, H.P., India. ISBN 81-86470-22-0.
- Meurois, Daniel, and Anne Givaudan (1987). Le Voyage a Shambhalla. Un pèlerinage vers soi. Ed. Le Passe-Monde.
- Meyer, Karl Ernest and Brysac, Shareen Blair (2006) Tournament of Shadows: The Great Game and the Race for Empire in Central Asia. ISBN 0-465-04576-6.
- Rock song "Halls of Shambala" by B. W. Stevenson, covered and popularized by the rock band Three Dog Night in "Shambala".
- Symmes, Patrick. (2007). "The Kingdom of the Lotus" in Outside, 30th Anniversary Special Edition, pp. 148–187. Mariah Media, Inc., Red Oak, Iowa.
- Trungpa, Chogyam. Shambhala: The Sacred Path of the Warrior. Shambhala Publications. ISBN 0-87773-264-7
- Znamenski, Andrei (2011). Red Shambhala: Magic, Prophecy, and Geopolitics in the Heart of Asia. Quest Books, Wheaton, IL (2011) ISBN 978-0-8356-0891-6.
- Znamenski, Andrei. Red Shambhala: Magic, Prophecy, and Geopolitics in the Heart of Asia. Wheaton, IL: Quest Books, 2011. ISBN 978-0-8356-0891-6.
- Rock opera Szambalia (Shambhala; 2014). Official premiere in Poland, Warsaw (24 June 2014).
