= Manjushrikirti =

King of Shambhala

Manjushrikirti or Manjughoshikirti (Skt. Mañjuśrīkīrti; Chinese: 妙吉祥稱; pinyin: Miàojíxiángchēng; Wylie: Jam-dpal Grags-pa, ZYPY: Qambai Chagba) is the 8th King of Shambhala, and a precursor in the lineage of the Panchen Lamas of Tibet. It is also a name which refers to two different figures in Indian Buddhism.

== Buddhist scholars ==
Mañjuśrīkīrti is the name of a student of Candrakīrti (c. 600 – c. 650).

Mañjuśrīkīrti is also the name of an Indian Buddhist scholar who wrote a commentary to the Samādhirāja Sūtra (King of Samādhis Sūtra) called the Kīrtimala (Tibetan: grags pa'i phreng ba) which survives in Tibetan translation. Four other works in the Tibetan canon are attributed to him, one text on Grammar and three works on tantra. His work shows strong influence of Yogacara Buddhism. Little else is known about this author.

It is doubtful that these two are the same figure, since the author of the Kīrtimala is strongly influenced by Yogacara vijñanavada, a view rejected by Candrakīrti.

== King of Shambhala ==
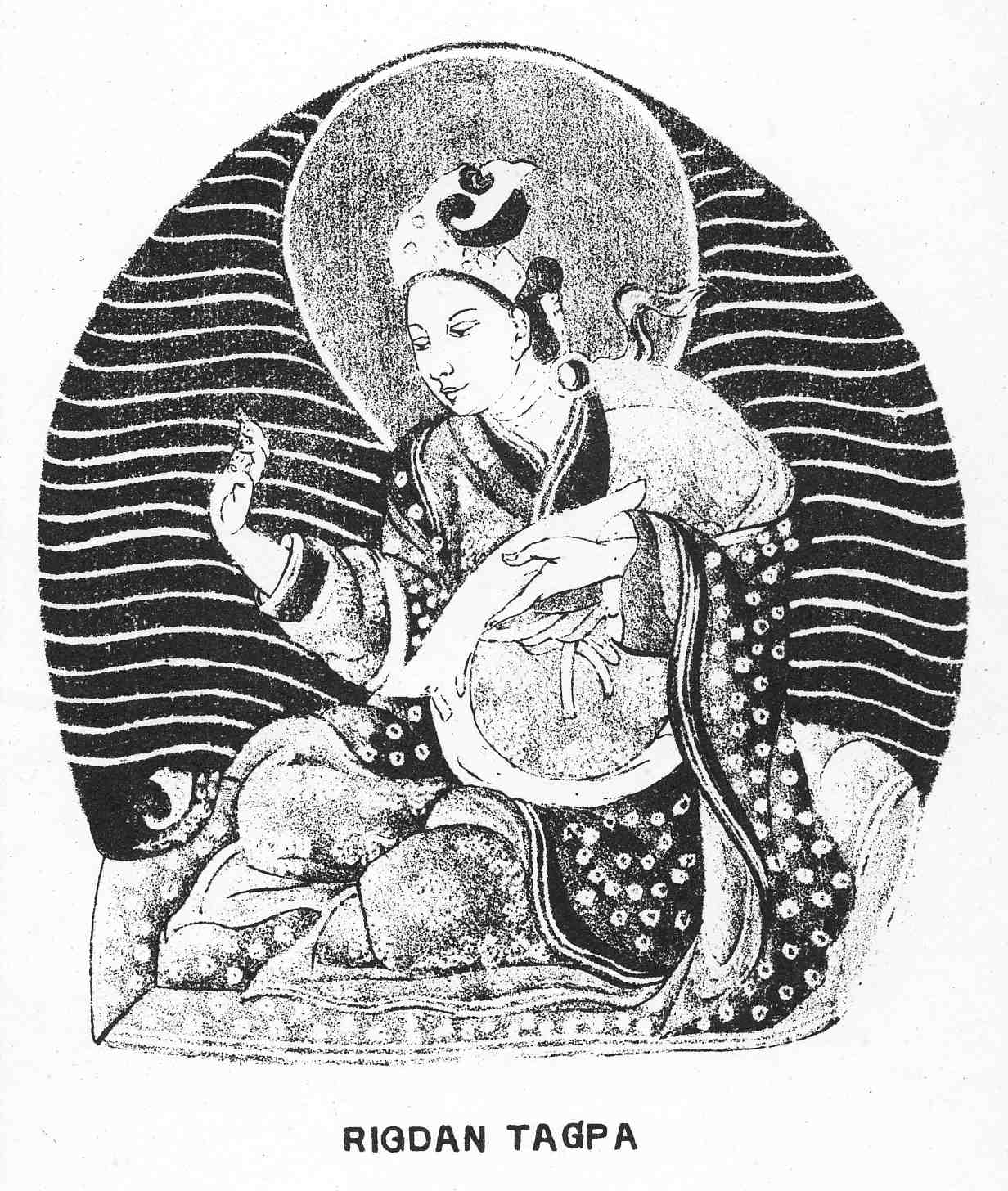
Rigden Trakpa or Manjushríkírti, King of Shambhala

Mañjuśrīkīrti is said to have been the Eighth King of Shambhala and is considered to be the second incarnation in the precursors of the lineage of the Panchen Lamas of Tibet. As his name indicates, he is considered to have been an incarnation of Manjushri, the Bodhisattva of Wisdom.

Manjushrikirti was born in Shambhala, the son of King Deva-Indra and his queen, Kauśikí. His rule is said to have extended over "hundreds of petty kings and a hundred thousand cities." He is said to have expelled 300,510 followers of heretical doctrine of the Mlechhas or "materialistic barbarians", some of whom worshipped the sun, but after reconsidering, he brought them back and they asked for his teachings. Next he united all the castes, or religious factions, of Shambala into one Vajra or 'Diamond' Caste. Consequentially, he was the first king of Shambhala to be given the title Kalki (Tib. Rigden), meaning "Holder of the Castes" or "Wisdom Holder."

He is said in Tibetan sources to have taken the throne 674 years after the death of Gautama Buddha. The most widely accepted dates for the Buddhas birth and mahaparinirvana follow the Sri Lankan convention : 624 BCE - 544 BCE. Using this convention, the 8th King of Shambhala sat on his throne in c. 130 CE. Other dating conventions could place him on the throne earlier.

The king then put the Kalachakra teachings in a condensed and simplified form called the "Sri Kalachakra" or "Laghutantra".

This work is also called the Condensed Kālachakra Tantra (bsdus rgyud, laghutantra). It is usual now simply called the Kālachakra Tantra, the original longer version one is no longer extant.

=== Lineage before the 1st Panchen Lama ===
In the lineage of the Panchen Lamas of Tibet, there are considered to be four Indian and three Tibetan incarnations (seven total incarnations) of Amitabha Buddha before Khedrup Gelek Pelzang, who is recognised as the 1st Panchen Lama. This lineage of seven incarnations before the Panchen Lama starts with Subhuti, and Manjushrikirti is considered the second incarnation.

== See also ==
- Kings of Shambhala
- Shambhala
