= Xiangcheng County, Sichuan =

Xiangcheng County 乡城县 · ཕྱག་ཕྲེང་རྫོང་། Qagchêng
- County
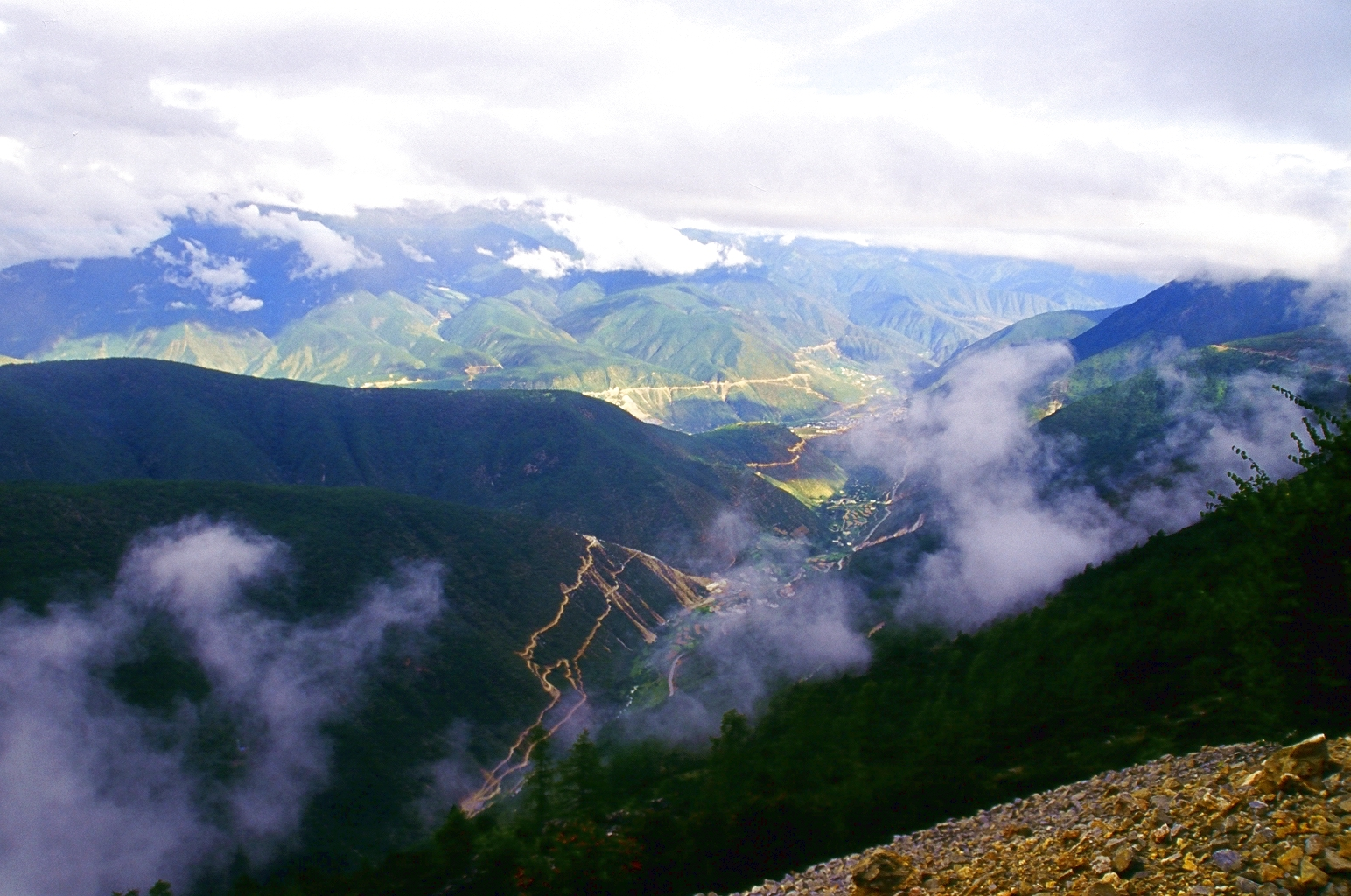

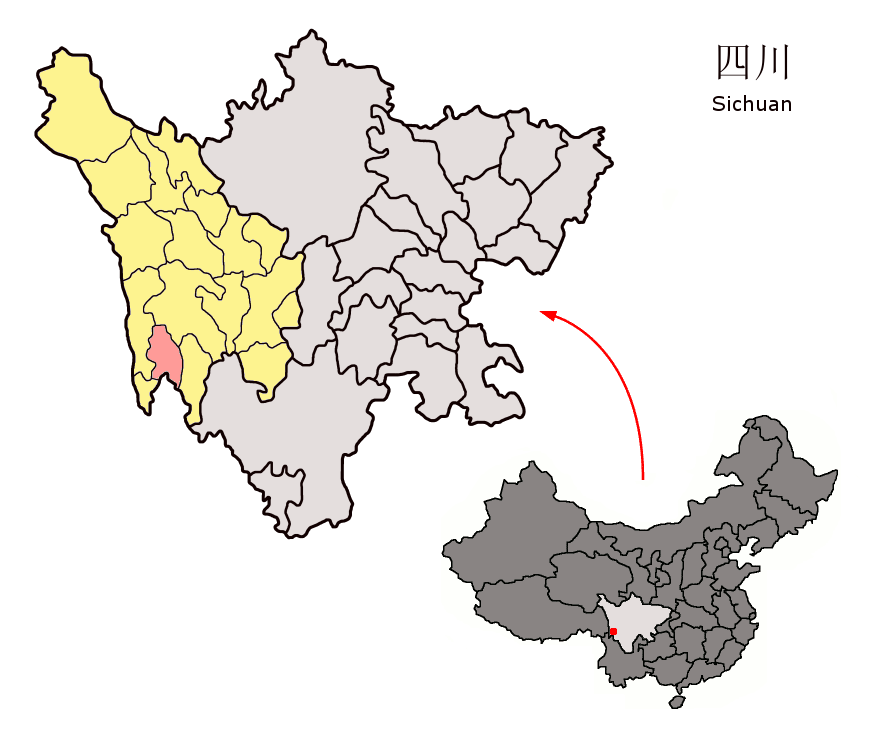
- Location of Xiangcheng County (red) within Garzê Prefecture (yellow) and Sichuan

- Location of the seat in Sichuan Xiangcheng (China)
- Coordinates: 29.2825°N 99.6081°E
- Country: China
- Province: Sichuan
- Autonomous prefecture: Garzê
- County seat: Shambala

Area
  - Total: 5,016 km^{2} (1,937 sq mi)

Population (2020)
  - Total: 31,407
  - Density: 6.261/km^{2} (16.22/sq mi)
- Time zone: UTC+8 (China Standard)
- Website: www.xcx.gov.cn

Xiangcheng County, Sichuan

Chinese name
- Simplified Chinese: 乡城县
- Traditional Chinese: 鄉城縣
Transcriptions
Standard Mandarin
- Hanyu Pinyin: Xiāngchéng Xiàn

Tibetan name
- Tibetan: ཕྱག་ཕྲེང་རྫོང་།
Transcriptions
- Wylie: phyag phreng rdzong
- Tibetan Pinyin: Qagchêng Zong

Xiangcheng County or Qagchêng (Chinese: 乡城县; Tibetan: ཕྱག་ཕྲེང་རྫོང་།) is a county in the west of Sichuan Province, China, bordering Yunnan province to the south. It is under the administration of the Garzê Tibetan Autonomous Prefecture.

== Administrative divisions ==
Xiangcheng County is divided into 3 towns and 7 townships.

Name	Simplified Chinese	Hanyu Pinyin	Tibetan	Wylie	Administrative division code
Towns
Shambala Town (Xambala, Xiangbala)	香巴拉镇	Xiāngbālā Zhèn	ཤམ་བྷ་ལ་གྲོང་རྡལ།	sham bha la grong rdal	513336100
Chêngdoi Town (Qingde)	青德镇	Qīngdé Zhèn	ཕྲེང་སྟོད་གྲོང་རྡལ།	phreng stod grong rdal	513336101
Radag Town (Reda)	热打镇	Rèdǎ Zhèn	རྭ་རྟགས་གྲོང་རྡལ།	rwa rtags grong rdal	513336103
Townships
Sakong Township (Shagong)	沙贡乡	Shāgòng Xiāng	ས་གོང་ཤང་།	sa gong shang	513336201
Siwa Township (Shuiwa)	水洼乡	Shuǐwā Xiāng	བསིལ་བ་ཤང་།	bsil ba shang	513336202
Ragwa Township (Ranwu)	然乌乡	Ránwū Xiāng	རག་ཝ་ཤང་།	rag wa shang	513336205
Dongsum Township (Dongsong)	洞松乡	Dòngsōng Xiāng	གདོང་གསུམ་ཤང་།	gdong gsum shang	513336206
Dêmo Township (Dingbo)	定波乡	Dìngbō Xiāng	བདེ་མོ་ཤང་།	bde mo shang	513336208
Zhodog Township (Zhengdou)	正斗乡	Zhèngdǒu Xiāng	སྒྲོ་མདོག་ཤང་།	sgro mdog shang	513336209
Bayü Township (Baiyi)	白依乡	Báiyī Xiāng	དཔའ་ཡུལ་ཤང་།	dpa' yul shang	513336210

== Climate ==
Climate data for Xiangcheng, elevation 2,844 m (9,331 ft), (1991–2020 normals, extremes 1981–present)
Month	Jan	Feb	Mar	Apr	May	Jun	Jul	Aug	Sep	Oct	Nov	Dec	Year
Record high °C (°F)	22.0 (71.6)	22.7 (72.9)	27.4 (81.3)	29.7 (85.5)	30.5 (86.9)	32.5 (90.5)	34.4 (93.9)	32.5 (90.5)	31.0 (87.8)	28.2 (82.8)	24.9 (76.8)	20.6 (69.1)	34.4 (93.9)
Mean daily maximum °C (°F)	12.2 (54.0)	14.1 (57.4)	16.6 (61.9)	19.5 (67.1)	23.1 (73.6)	25.8 (78.4)	24.5 (76.1)	23.8 (74.8)	22.9 (73.2)	20.4 (68.7)	16.6 (61.9)	13.3 (55.9)	19.4 (66.9)
Daily mean °C (°F)	2.7 (36.9)	5.1 (41.2)	8.1 (46.6)	11.5 (52.7)	15.6 (60.1)	18.6 (65.5)	17.7 (63.9)	16.9 (62.4)	15.6 (60.1)	11.8 (53.2)	6.7 (44.1)	3.0 (37.4)	11.1 (52.0)
Mean daily minimum °C (°F)	−5.3 (22.5)	−3.0 (26.6)	0.4 (32.7)	4.2 (39.6)	8.4 (47.1)	12.3 (54.1)	13.1 (55.6)	12.5 (54.5)	10.7 (51.3)	5.0 (41.0)	−1.0 (30.2)	−4.8 (23.4)	4.4 (39.9)
Record low °C (°F)	−14.4 (6.1)	−11.3 (11.7)	−6.3 (20.7)	−3.5 (25.7)	−1.0 (30.2)	3.6 (38.5)	5.1 (41.2)	5.6 (42.1)	1.9 (35.4)	−3.5 (25.7)	−8.3 (17.1)	−13.3 (8.1)	−14.4 (6.1)
Average precipitation mm (inches)	1.6 (0.06)	1.4 (0.06)	5.9 (0.23)	11.0 (0.43)	26.5 (1.04)	73.8 (2.91)	159.9 (6.30)	130.4 (5.13)	69.2 (2.72)	15.3 (0.60)	2.6 (0.10)	0.5 (0.02)	498.1 (19.6)
Average precipitation days (≥ 0.1 mm)	1.3	1.6	4.0	7.2	9.1	14.7	22.3	21.1	14.0	5.5	1.5	0.6	102.9
Average snowy days	2.4	3.1	2.1	0.1	0	0	0	0	0	0.1	1.1	1.2	10.1
Average relative humidity (%)	34	34	39	44	47	56	70	73	69	56	43	36	50
Mean monthly sunshine hours	200.5	184.3	202.2	196.7	203.5	176.3	140.7	145.2	140.3	176.2	189.5	204.7	2,160.1
Percentage possible sunshine	61	58	54	51	48	42	33	36	38	50	60	64	50
Source: China Meteorological Administration All time August record high All-time October highall-time November record high

== Terrain maps ==
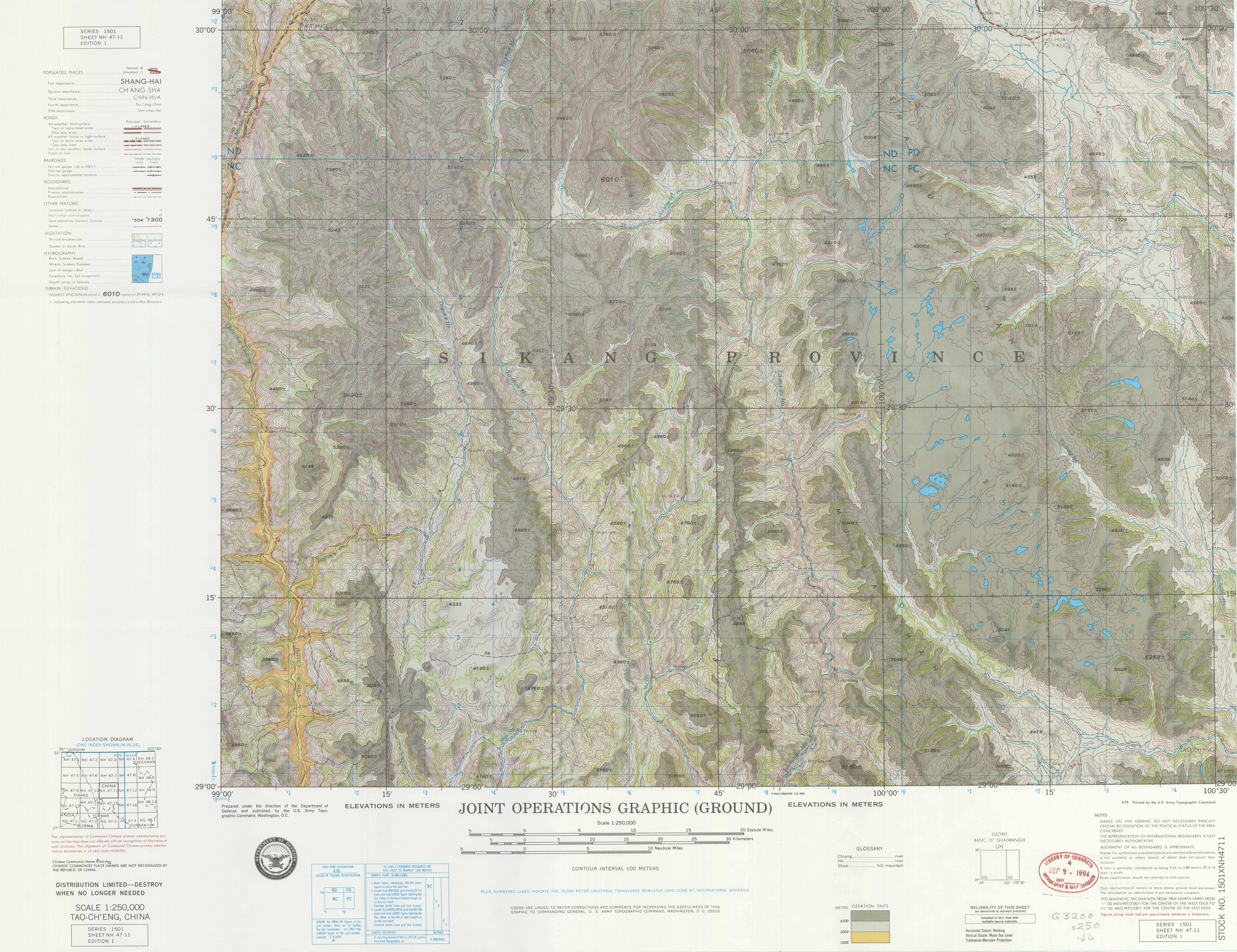
NH 47-11 (Taocheng)

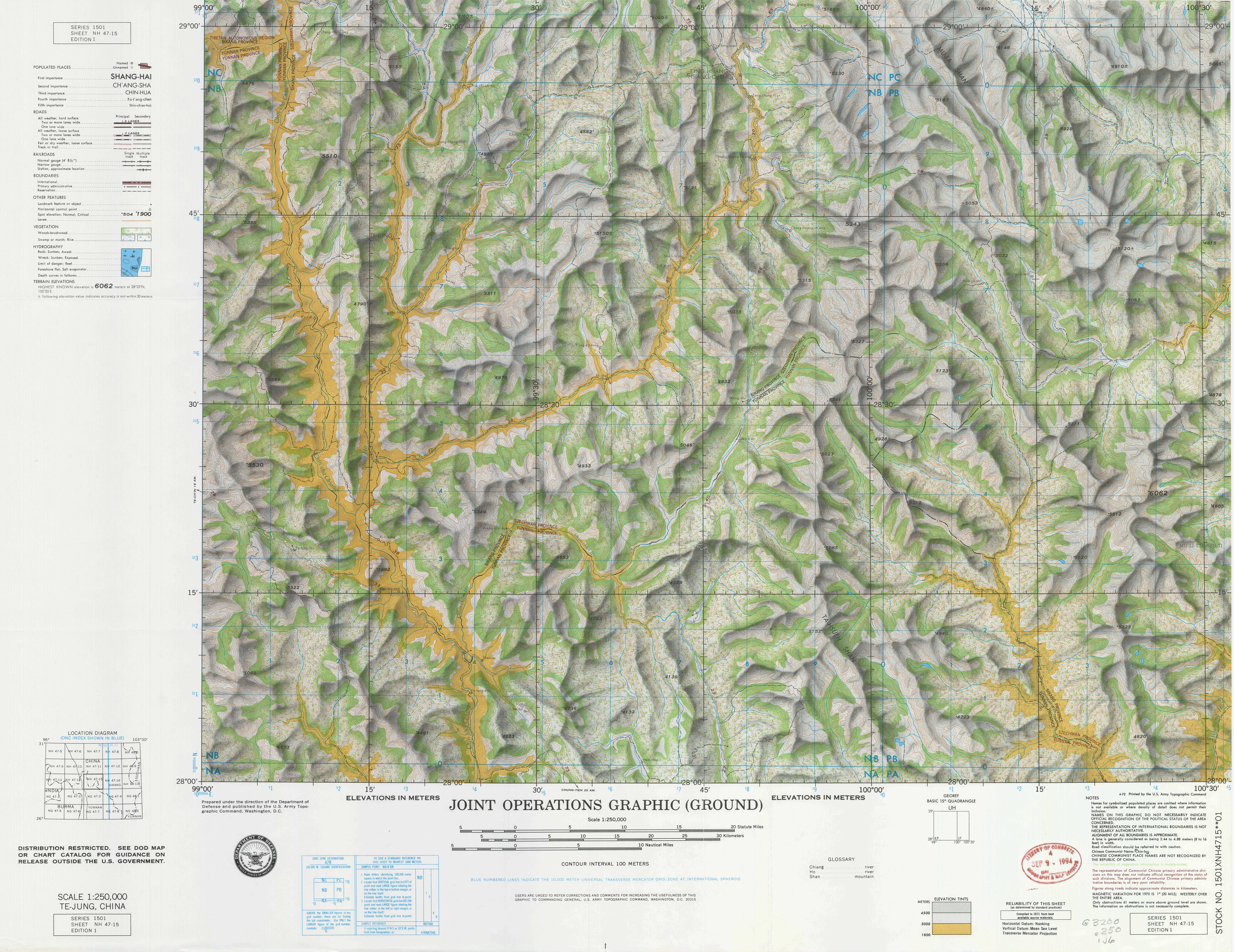
NH 47-15 (Tejung)
