= Samadhiraja Sutra =

Sutra in Mahāyāna Buddhism

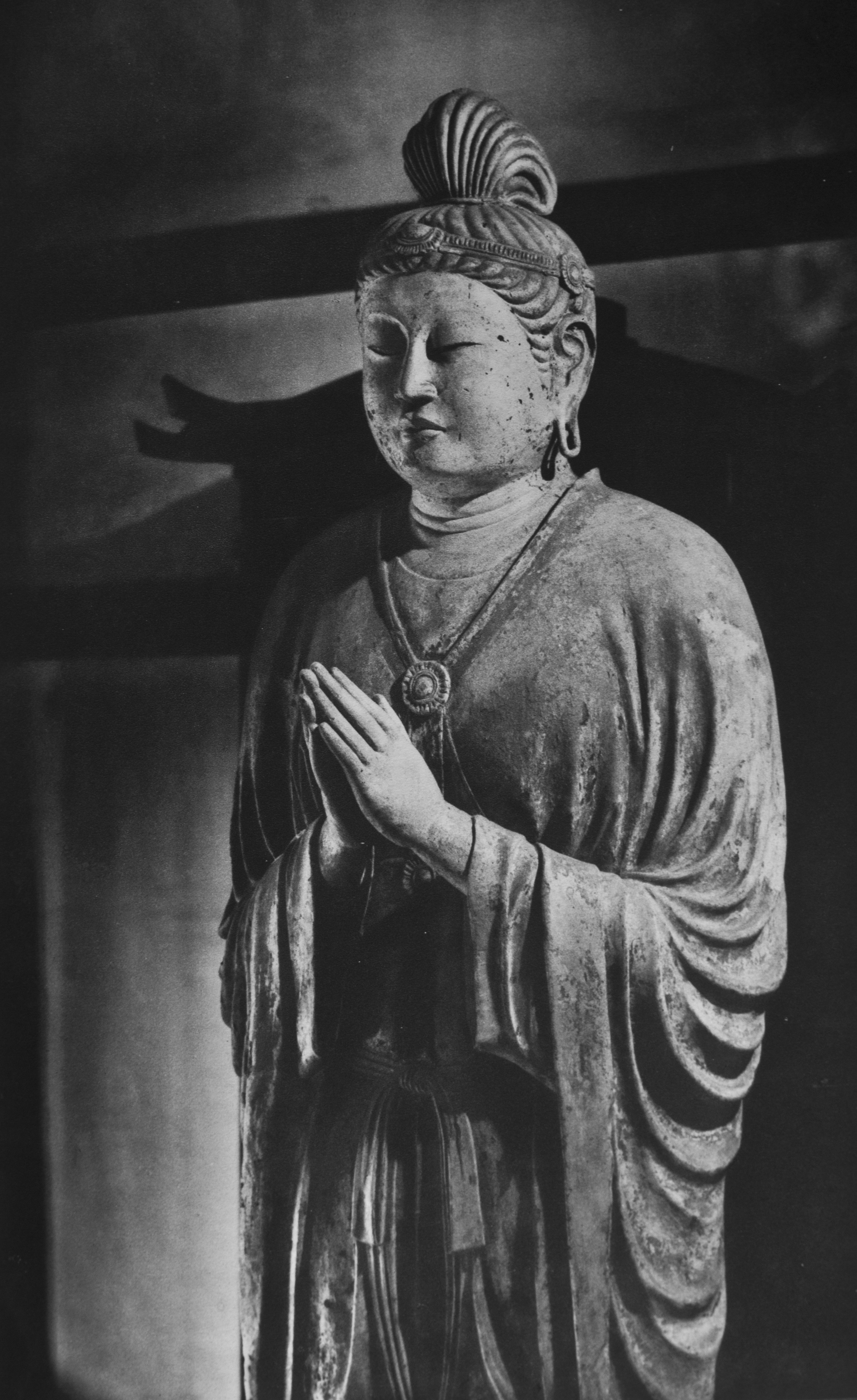
Candraprabha (Gakkō Bosatsu, Moonlight Bodhisattva) sculpture, Tōdai-ji, Nara. Candraprabha is the Buddha's main interlocutor in the Candrapradīpa.

The Samādhirāja Sūtra (King of Samādhis Sūtra) or Candrapradīpa Sūtra (Moonlamp Sūtra) is a Buddhist Mahayana sutra. Some scholars have dated its redaction from the 2nd or 3rd century CE to the 6th century (the date of the earliest manuscript found), but others argue that its date just cannot be determined. The Samādhirāja is a very important source for the Madhyamaka school and it is cited by numerous Indian authors like Chandrakirti, Shantideva and later Buddhist authors. According to Alex Wayman, the Samādhirāja is "perhaps the most important scriptural source for the Madhyamika." The Samādhirāja is also widely cited in Tantric Buddhist sources, which promote its recitation for ritual purposes. A commentary to the sutra, the Kīrtimala (Tibetan: grags pa'i phreng ba), was composed by the Indian Manjushrikirti and this survives in Tibetan.

== Title ==
The text is commonly known as the King of Samadhis Sutra (Samādhirājasūtra, Tib. ting nge 'dzin gyi rgyal po'i mdo), and it is also known as the Moon Lamp Sutra (Skt. Candrapradīpa Sutra, Tib. zla ba sgron me’i mdo) after the main bodhisattva in this sutra.

The full Tibetan title in the Kanjur is:

- ’phags pa chos thams cad kyi rang bzhin mnyam pa nyid rnam par spros pa ting nge ’dzin gyi rgyal po zhes bya ba theg pa chen po’i mdo
- Sanskrit: Ārya-sarvadharma-svabhāvasamatā-vipañcita-samādhirāja-nāma-mahāyānasūtra
- In English, this long title may be translated as The Noble Mahāyāna Sūtra “The King of Samādhis, the Revealed Equality of the Nature of All Phenomena” (Roberts) or "the samadhi that is manifested as the sameness of the essential nature of all dharmas," (Luis and Gomez) or "the Mahayana discourse that is called the king of samadhi, as received from the samadhi elaborated as the sameness in their essence of all phenomena" (Skilton).

The Chinese have preferred Yueh-teng san-mei ching, corresponding to *Candrapradīpa-samādhisūtra (Moon Lamp Samadhi Sutra).

== History and Texts ==
Peter Alan Roberts writes that "it is impossible to be sure when this work first appeared in writing; indeed, the sūtra is very likely a compilation of earlier shorter works. None of the complete extant Sanskrit manuscripts can be dated to earlier than the sixth century." However, he also notes that it is cited in the Sūtrasamuccaya (c. 4th century or later) and also may have been referenced to by Asanga (4th century). Gomez and Silk write that "an educated guess is that the text took form between the second century C.E., when it is generally believed Madhyamaka thought emerged as a distinct philosophical tradition, and the sixth century, the date of the Gilgit manuscript, the earliest extant recension of the text. This does not mean that the text was not in existence in some form before the second century." They also note that a Chinese translation of the text by An Shigao (fl. mid-second century CE) is recorded in Chinese sutra catalogues.

Andrew Skilton writes that this large sutra is probably a composite work which "bears certain affinities with the Prajñāpāramitā literature and other early Mahayana scriptures". He also writes that there were various recensions and versions of this sutra in circulation in India.

According to Roberts, "at least two shorter independent works that may have existed earlier appear to have been incorporated into the King of Samadhis Sutra." These are:

- The Mahāprajñāsamādhisūtra (The Sūtra of the Samādhi of Great Wisdom), also called the Mañjuśrībodhisattvacāryā (The Bodhisattva Conduct of Mañjuśrī). This was translated into Chinese by Shih Sien-kung (420–479). This sutra which focuses on the six perfections corresponds to chapters 27–29 in the Tibetan King of Samadhis, with the only difference being that Mañjuśrī has been replaced with Candraprabha.
- Chapter 36 of the Tibetan translation also seems to have circulated as an independent sutra.

The King of Samadhis was translated into Chinese by Narendrayaśas (517–589), an Indian monk from Orissa, who titled it The Sūtra of the Samādhi of the Lamp of the Moon (月燈三昧經, Taishō 639). Two other Chinese translations include an alternative version of the equivalent of the sixth fascicle by Xiangong (逮慧三昧經, The Attainment of Wisdom Samādhi Sūtra) and an alternative translation of the equivalent of the seventh fascicle by Xiangong (文殊師利菩薩十事行經, The Ten Practices of Mañjuśrī Bodhisattva Sūtra).

Fragments from three Central Asian Sanskrit manuscripts of the sutra have been found. They date to the fifth or sixth centuries. A Tibetan translation was made in the ninth century by Śīlendrabodhi and Chönyi Tsultrim (Dharmatāśīla). This Tibetan version is longer than the earlier Chinese translation and is divided into forty chapters. The Chinese edition meanwhile is in ten fascicles (juans 卷).

A complete Indian Sanskrit manuscript was discovered near Gilgit in 1938 which has been dated to the sixth century. According to Roberts, this text is "significantly shorter than the Tibetan translation, with fewer verses and prose passages." Other Sanskrit manuscripts which have been found in Nepal are longer and closer to the Tibetan translation, some Nepalese versions even contain material not found in the Tibetan. The Sanskrit versions of the sutra are mostly composed in Buddhist Hybrid Sanskrit (BHS) or strongly influenced by BHS.

A Sanskrit version of the sutra was published in Devanagari along with an English summary of the chapters in 1941 by Nalinaksha Dutt. According to Gomez and Silk, "Dutt's edition is wanting in more than one respect. It is, unfortunately, at its best a conflation of manuscripts, at its worst a reconstruction from the Tibetan." They also note that a more recent edition by P. L. Vaidya (1961) is "equally problematic" since it is "essentially a copy of Dutt's edition" with some modifications by the author. They finally add that "a more rigorous task has been accomplished by Seiren Matsunami."

== Content and themes ==
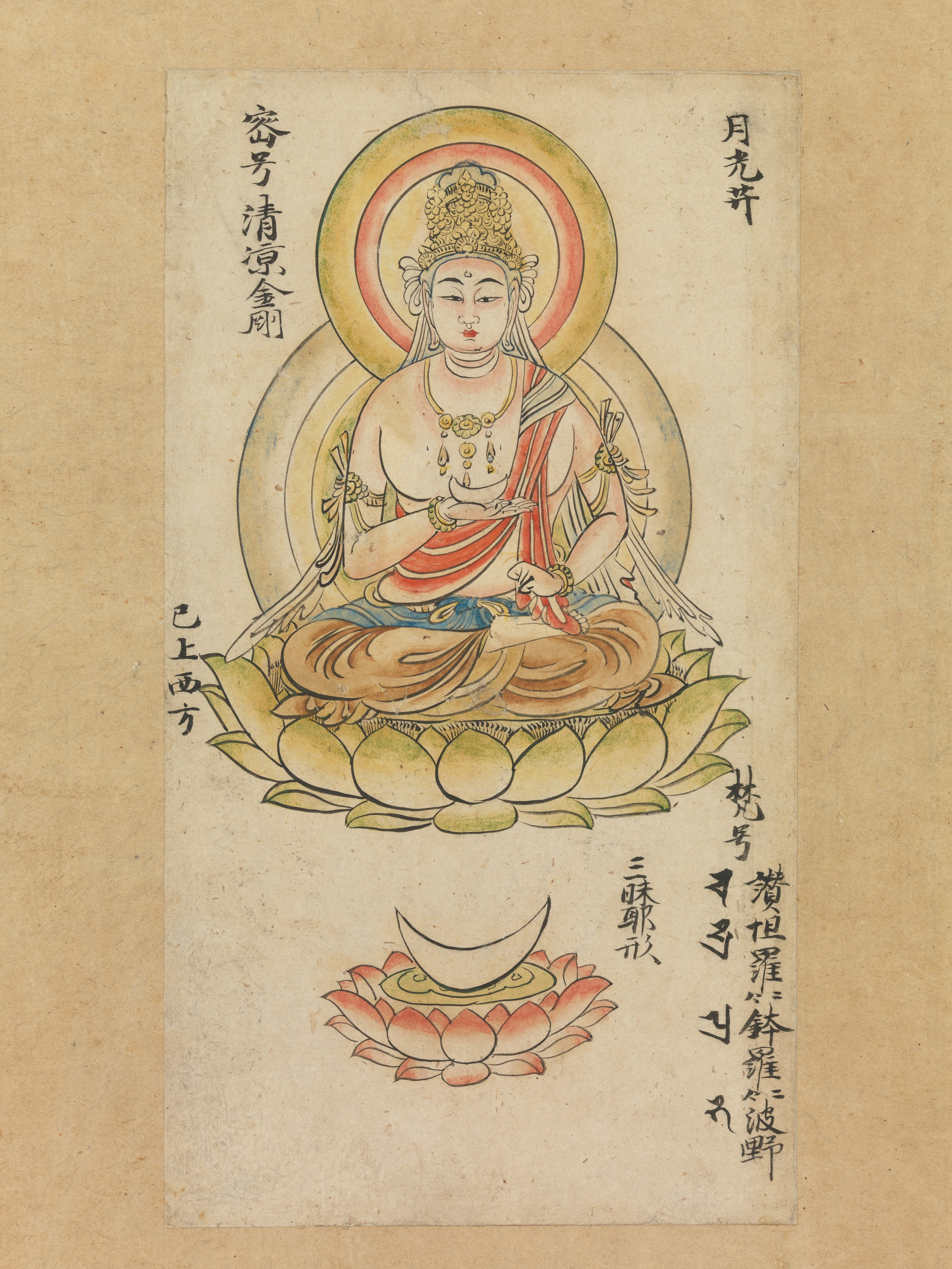
A 12th century Japanese depiction of bodhisattva Candraprabha

The King of Samādhis Sūtra is written in mixed prose and verse. Gomez and Silk outline the main stylistic form of the sutra's chapters (this analysis uses the long version found in the Tibetan translation and some Sanskrit mss) as follows:

- Five chapters-I, X, XIV, XV and XL form the "main narrative or backbone of the text, that is, the events surrounding the Buddha's meeting with Candraprabha."
- Various chapters which contain avadanas or purvayogas (mainly stories of past lives of the Buddha) are found inserted throughout the sutra, these are chapters II, V, VIII, XVI, XX, XXI, XXIX, XXXIII, XXXIV, XXXV and XXXVII.
- The bulk of the text (24 chapters) contain mostly expository prose and verse.

=== The King of Samādhis ===
The King of Samādhis Sūtra claims its main theme is a samādhi (which is the "King of Samādhis") that is the key to all virtues of the Buddhas and bodhisattvas and is thus "the single dharma [ekadharmena] that summarizes all teachings and practices". This samādhi is called "the samādhi that is manifested as the sameness of the essential nature of all dharmas" (sarva-dharma-svabhavā-samatā-vipañcita-samādhi). Skilton notes that this samādhi is the main subject of the sutra. While Gomez and Silk take vipañcita to mean 'manifested', Skilton interprets the term as "elaborated", and sees this samādhi as (at least partly) a kind of literary theme which is explained and elaborated upon in the sutra.

The sutra begins at Vulture Peak, where the main bodhisattva in this sutra, Candraprabha, asks the Buddha how to acquire certain important qualities of the Buddhas. The Buddha replies that there is "one single dharma" which leads to these virtues. The Buddha first describes the samadhi called "the elaboration of the sameness in their essence of all phenomena" through the following short statement: "his mind is equable towards all beings, his mind is beneficial, his mind is sympathetic, his mind is not inclined to retaliation, his mind is not vexatious."

Silk and Gomez write that the Samādhirāja uses the term "samādhi" in a very broad way. This supreme samādhi "is at the same time the cognitive experience of emptiness, the attainment of the attributes of buddhahood, and the performance of a variety of practices or daily activities of a bodhisattva—including service and adoration at the feet of all buddhas." The Samādhirāja also uses the term to refer to itself, equating the sutra with samādhi and emptiness.

The sutra then goes on to list over three hundred descriptions of this samadhi, such as: restraint of body, speech and mind, "purity of actions", "going completely beyond supports," "comprehension of the aggregates", "indifference towards the bases of consciousness", "withdrawal from the sense-fields," "abandonment of craving," "direct realization of non-arising," "friendliness," "sweetness," good conduct, lack of aversion and attachment, knowledge of the Truths, the teaching, the analytical knowledges, knowledge of "the divisions of words and syllables," and so on.

Skilton argues that the list is explicitly introduced as being the samadhi itself, while the Chinese translations suggests that they are aspects or benefits of the samadhi. According to Skilton, the sutra uses the term "samadhi" here to refer to the list of terms itself and he argues that this usage is also found in other Mahayana texts. He also lists various passages from the sutra which speak of "hearing", "memorizing", "reciting," and "holding in one's hand" the samadhi taught in this sutra. Skilton argues that these passages show that the term samadhi must be referring to a text (i.e. the list of over 300 items).

Gomez and Silk meanwhile write that the list contains "the virtues or extraordinary qualities" and "the merits and powers" of the samadhi, which they describe as a deep meditative state (which is the typical meaning of the term samadhi in Indian Buddhism). They also write that "it is not clear whether the terms or epithets are meant as definitions or descriptions or if they are attributes of the samadhi, its causes or effects." On the other hand, Constantin Regamey argues that this samadhi (i.e. this list) is "the subject of the concentration, a verbal formula to be meditated upon." He thinks that this was to be done by repeating the formula in a similar manner to a dharani. He also notes that the recommendation found throughout the sutra to read, recite and learn this samadhi indicate how important this list of terms was for the authors of the sutra.

After listing the various qualities or descriptions of the samadhi, the Buddha urges Candraprabha to practice and "preserve the samadhi" which refers to preserving the text in memory or in written form as well as a variety of spiritual exercises associated with the Indic term samadhi. This practice of "preserving the samadhi" is said to lead to many merits, which are outlined in the sutra. Another element of this samadhi is a kind of mindfulness of the Buddha (buddhānusmṛti). The Buddha also explains how all phenomena are to be seen as being without essence, like a dream or a magic show, which is the "essential nature of all phenomena" (sarva-dharma-svabhavā).

In a later passage from chapter 4 of the sutra, Candraprabha asks the Buddha for a definition of "samadhi", the Buddha responds:

Young man, the term samadhi is being used; that is to say: comprehension of the mind; not a state of rebirth; knowledge of non rebirth; the state of having laid aside one’s burden; knowledge of the Tathagatas; ... the protection of secret spells, harmlessness, the state of not oppressing those who are well behaved, the state of possessing subtle speech, the state of being free from the entire threefold world system, acceptance in conformity with emptiness in respect of all dharmas,, a state of intense desire for the knowledge of the All Knowing; the term samadhi is being used thus, young man. Correct and not incorrect practice (avi/pratipatti) in respect of such items (dharmas) as these—it is this, young man, for which the term samadhi is used.

=== Other topics ===
While the sutra claims to be about samādhi, it does not only focus on this topic or on meditation in general. Rather, the sutra covers numerous topics and also contains many long narrative passages (avadanas) related to the Buddha's past lives which illustrate different teachings. Interspersed with these narratives are verse teachings given by past Buddhas, some of which are widely celebrated and quoted verses on the ultimate nature of phenomena.

The Samādhirāja contains a broad and eclectic range of teachings and ideas and so it is hard to place it in a single category. According to Gomez and Silk, the sutra "makes room for more than one dimension of Buddhist religion: meditation, worship of the Buddhas, the cult of the Book, philosophical speculation, rehearsal of myth (in avadanā style) and so on." They also write that the bulk of the sutra contains various passages on other ancillary topics like "buddhānusmṛti, the nature and virtues of a buddha, a buddha's body, the nature of his speech and silence, his realization of emptiness" as well as the six perfections and the precepts. They also note that "one should not underestimate the importance of the narrative sections, both as fine examples of Buddhist literature and as doctrinal statements."

Peter Alan Roberts writes that this sutra "contains teachings on emptiness, bodhisattva conduct, and mendicancy, as well as tales of previous lifetimes and prophecies for the future."

Roberts writes that the Samādhirāja emphasizes Buddhist mendicancy, forest living, having few possessions and other austere Buddhist monastic practices while criticizing Buddhist monks who do not follow this lifestyle. The sutra also "likens nirvāṇa to a flame being extinguished, bringing any activity to an end." It also repeatedly emphasizes how bodhisattvas take many aeons to reach Buddhahood.

Like the Perfection of Wisdom sutras, the Samādhirāja also discusses only two bodies of the Buddha, the rupa-kaya and the Dharma-kaya and does not mention the later "Trikaya" doctrine.

== Influence ==
Mark Tatz calls the sutra's thought "early Madhyamika" and "closely rooted in the Perfection of Wisdom." Gomez and Silk note that even though the Samādhirāja has been seen as a Madhyamaka school text by some scholars, "the sutra's doctrinal position cannot be described accurately as unambiguously Mādhyamika" and is instead an "eclectic and universalistic, so that it would be pointless to attempt to box it in some general category." Whatever the case, the Samādhirāja was a very important and authoritative text for Mādhyamika scholars in India (while it was ignored in Yogacara) and its doctrines have "a strong leaning towards a philosophic position that can be described as akin to that of the Madhyamaka."

The sutra is cited by Candrakīrti (7th century) twenty times in his Prasannapadā, and it is also cited in his Madhyamakāvatāra. Indeed, Gomez and Silk write that "Candrakīrti quotes it so frequently in his Prasannapadā that one can construe many of his comments on Nagarjuna's Karikas as comments on the sutra, at least in the sense that they place the sutra within a wider interpretive context." Another important Madhyamaka author, Śāntideva quotes the sutra twenty times in his Śikṣasamuccaya. The sutra is also cited by Śāntarakṣita in his Madhyamakālaṃkāra, by Kamalaśīla in his Bhāvanākrama (Stages of Meditation), by Prajñākaramati in his Bodhisattvacaryāvatārapañjikā (A Commentary on Śāntideva's Bodhisattvacaryāvatāra) as well as by Atiśa Dīpankara, Vimalamitra, and Jñānaśrīmitra (fl. 975-1025 C.E.).

Two Indian commentaries on the Samādhirāja are known, one of which is Manjushrikirti's Kīrtimala (Garland of Fame, Toh 4010; P 5511). Chandragomin (c. 5th to 7th-century CE) also wrote a commentary, which has not survived.

The Samādhirāja remained a popular source in the Tantric Age, and it is cited in numerous Buddhist tantric works, some of which also promote its recitation. Roberts writes that "the Maṇḍala Rite of Cakrasamvara says that four sūtras should be recited, one in each of the four main directions around the maṇḍala. The sūtras are the Prajñāparāmitā (Perfection of Wisdom in Eight Thousand Verses); Gaṇḍavyūha (Array of Trees), which is the last chapter of the Avataṃsaka; Laṅkāvātara (Entry into Laṅka); and Samādhirāja (King of Samādhis). Similarly, the Mañjuśrīmūlakalpa teaches the recitation of the Samādhirāja for two ritual occasions: for a consecration ceremony for a painted scroll (pata) and for a western door of a tantric mandala.

The sutra remains influential in Nepalese Buddhism, where it is one of the nine principal Mahayana texts (the "nine Dharmas") in that tradition, which include the four texts cited above as well as the Saddharmapuṇḍarīka (The White Lotus of the Good Dharma), Lalitavistara (The Play in Full), Tathāgataguhyaka (The Secret of the Tathāgatas), Suvarṇaprabha (The Golden Light), and Daśabhūmika (The Ten Bhūmis).

In East Asian Buddhism, the Samādhirāja was never really very popular and is seldom quoted or commented upon.

=== In Tibet ===
According to Gomez and Silk, "although it is questionable how much the sutra itself was read in Tibet, it is often cited in Tibetan philosophical literature, probably mostly on the basis of quotations found in Indian texts."

In Tibet, the King of Samādhis Sūtra was studied by the Kadampa school of Atiśa (980–1054), for whom it was an important source. One of his students, Nagtsho Lotsawa, translated the commentary to this sutra, the Kīrtimālā (The Garland of Fame), by the Indian Mañjuśrīkīrti.

The Samādhirāja is often cited as an important source for śamatha instructions by the Kagyu tradition, particularly via commentary by Gampopa, although Andrew Skilton notes that the sūtra itself does not contain much meditation instruction. It is asserted in the Kagyu tradition that the Samādhirājasūtra predicted the dharma activity of Gampopa and the Karmapas. The modern Kagyu lama, Thrangu Rinpoche, has published an extensive commentary on this sutra.

The Samādhirāja is also widely cited by Gelug authors. Tsongkhapa quotes the sūtra thirteen times in his Lamrim Chenmo. His student Khedrup Jé also cites it widely in his works. Khedrup sees this sutra as the most important of the Madhyamaka sutras after the Perfection of Wisdom sutras.

Roberts also writes that "the sūtra is also much quoted in the best known commentarial works of the great scholars of all traditions, including several of the early Sakya masters, Longchenpa, Minling Terchen, and Drikung Chökyi Trakpa, as well as those of later authors like Jamgön Kongtrul, Mipham, Jamyang Khyentse Wangpo, and Jigme Tenpai Nyima." Buton cites it numerous times in his History of Buddhism (chos 'byung).

== English Translations ==
Full translations:

- Roberts, Peter Alan (2022). The King of Samādhis Sūtra. 84000 Translating The Words of The Buddha. Translated from the Tibetan.
- O'Neill, Alexander James (2026). The Candrapradīpa Samādhi Sūtra: A Translation of the Candrapradīpa Samādhi Sūtra and its Variants from Chinese. Dharmakāya Books. This also includes a translation of three other related texts from the Chinese canon.

Partial translations:

- The first four chapters have been translated by Luis O. Gomez and Jonathan A. Silk.
- The fourth, sixth, seventh and ninth chapters were translated by John Rockwell in an MA thesis at Naropa Institute.
- The eleventh chapter was translated by Mark Tatz in his MA thesis at the University of Washington (1972).
- The eight, nineteenth and twenty-second chapters were translated by Konstanty Regamey.

== Quotations ==
Dudjom Rinpoche (1904–1987), a prominent Nyingma lama, quotes the following passage from the Samādhirāja Sūtra:

In thousands of world systems
The sūtras which I have explained
Differ in words and syllables but have the same meaning.
It is impossible to express them all,
But if one meditates deeply on a single word,
One comes to meditate on them all.
All the buddhas, as many as there are,
Have abundantly explained phenomena.
But if those skilled in meaning
Were to study only the phrase:
All things are emptiness
The doctrine of the Buddha would not be scarce.

Constantin Regamey translates a passage from the Samadhiraja Sutra discussing the Dharmakaya:

...the Body of the Tathagata [i.e. Buddha] should be defined as … having its essence identical with Space, invisible, surpassing the range of vision – thus is the Absolute Body to be conceived. Inconceivable, surpassing the sphere of thought, not oscillating between bliss and suffering, surpassing the illusory differentiation, placeless, surpassing the voice of those aspiring to the Knowledge of Buddhi, essential, surpassing passions, indivisible, surpassing hatred, steadfast, surpassing infatuation, explained by the indications of emptiness, unborn, surpassing birth, eternal from the standpoint of common experience, undifferentiated in the aspect of Nirvana, described in words as ineffable, quiescent in voice, homogenous with regard to conventional Truth, conventional with regard to the Absolute Truth – Absolute according to the true teaching.

== Notes ==
=== Further reading ===
- Bennett, A.A.G. (1968). "Excerpts from the Samadhiraja-Sutra", The Maha Bodhi 77, Calcutta 1958, 295–298.
- Cüppers, Christopher (1990). The IXth Chapter of the Samadhirajasutra. Stuttgart.
- Gomez, L.O. and J.A. Silk, eds (1989). "The Sutra of the King of Samādhis, Chapters I-IV." Studies in the Literature of the Great Vehicle, University of Michigan.
- Hartmann, Jens-Uwe (1996). "A note on a newly-identified palm-leaf manuscript of the Samadhirajasutra", Indo-Iranian Journal 39, 105–109.
- Rinpoche, Phakchok (2020). In the Footsteps of Bodhisattvas: Buddhist Teachings on the Essence of Meditation. Shambhala Publications. ISBN 978-1611808377.
- Rockwell Jr., John (1980). Samadhi and Patient Acceptance: Four Chapters of the Samadhiraja-sutra. translated from the Sanskrit and Tibetan. M.A.Thesis, The Naropa Institute, Boulder, Colorado.
- Skilton, Andrew T. (1999). "Dating the Samadhiraja Sutra." Journal of Indian Philosophy 27, 635–652.
- Skilton, Andrew T. (2000). "The Gilgit Manuscript of the Samadhiraja Sutra." Central Asiatic Journal 44, 67–86.
- Skilton, Andrew T. (1999). '"Four Recensions of the Samadhiraja Sutra." Indo-Iranian Journal 42, 335–336.
- Skilton, Andrew T. (?). "Samadhirajasutra", MonSC 2, 97–178.
- Skilton, Andrew T. (2002). "State or statement? Samadhi in some early Mahayana Sutras", The Eastern Buddhist 34.2, 51–93.
- Tatz, Mark (1972). Revelation in Madhyamika Buddhism. M.A.Thesis, University of Washington.
- Thrangu Rinpoche (2004). King of Samadhi: Commentaries on the Samadhi Raja Sutra and the Song of Lodrö Thaye. North Atlantic Books: ISBN 962-7341-19-3.

== External sources ==
- Rangjung Dorje (root text); Venerable Khenchen Thrangu Rinpoche (commentary); Peter Roberts (translator) (2001). Transcending Ego - Distinguishing Consciousness from Wisdom (Wylie: rnam shes ye shes ‘byed pa). (accessed: Wednesday April 1, 2009)
- Philosophy in the Samādhirājasūtra: three chapters from the Samādhirājasūtra By Constantin Regamey @ Google Books
- An English translation by 84000: Translating the Words of the Buddha
