= Madian, Henan =

Madian 马店镇
- Town
- Location in Henan
- Coordinates: 34°21′59″N 111°32′7″E
- Country: People's Republic of China
- Province: Henan
- Prefecture-level city: Luoyang
- County: Luoning County
- Time zone: UTC+8 (China Standard)

Madian (simplified Chinese: 马店; traditional Chinese: 馬店; pinyin: Mǎdiàn) is a town under the administration of Luoning County, Henan, China. As of 2018, it has 24 villages under its administration.
