= Shangdu (disambiguation) =

Shangdu, also known as Xanadu, the summer capital of the Yuan Dynasty founded by Kublai Khan

Shangdu may also refer to:

- Shangdu, Xilin Gol (上都), a town (镇) in the Plain Blue Banner of Xilin Gol league, Inner Mongolia, China
- Shangdu County (商都), a county of Ulanqab, Inner Mongolia, China

== See also ==
- Xanadu (disambiguation)
