= Luoning County =

Luoning County 洛宁县 Loning
- County
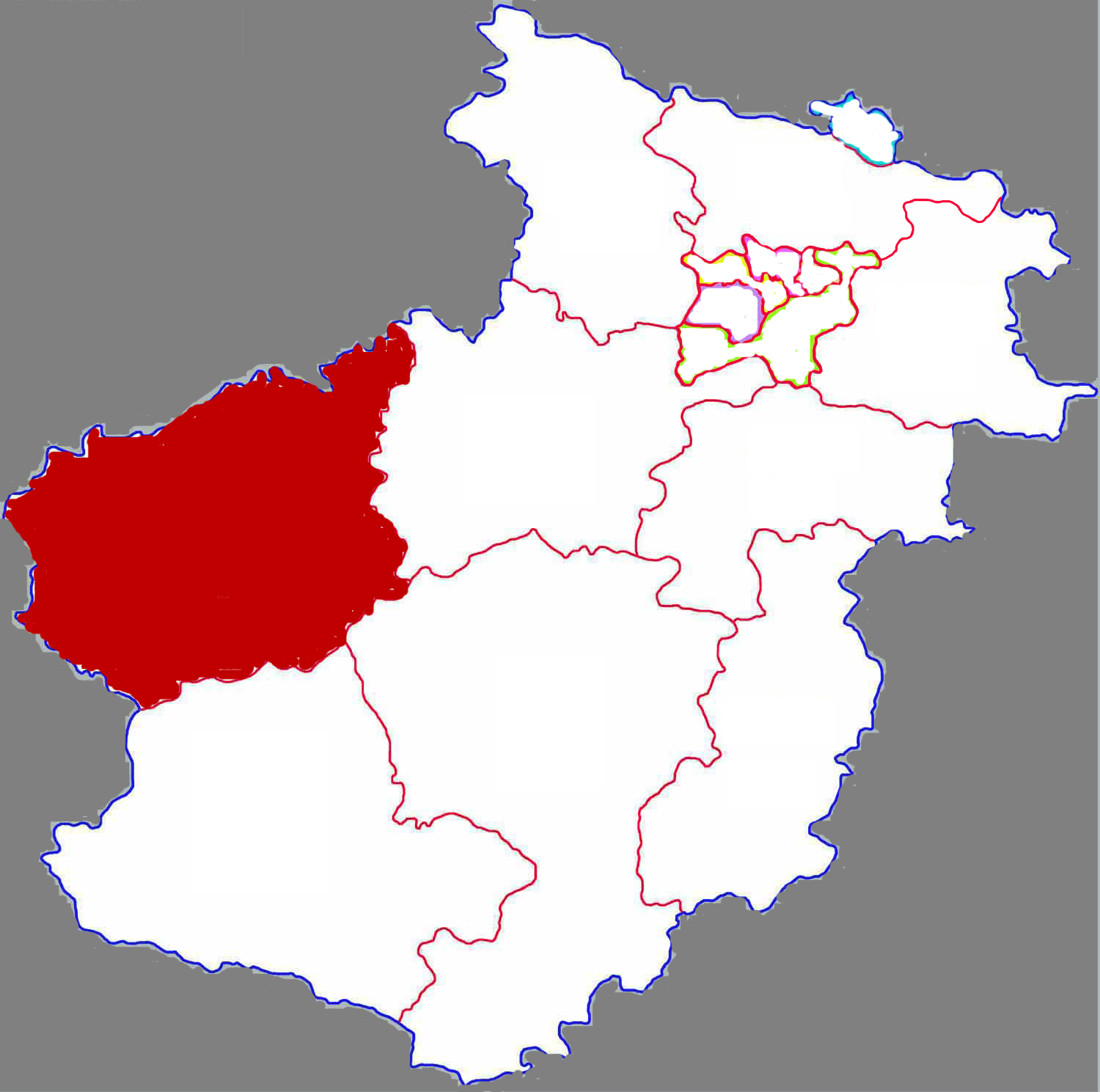
- Luoning in Luoyang

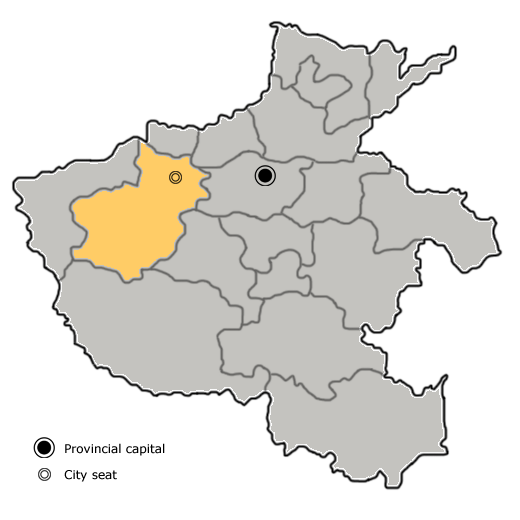
- Luoyang in Henan
- Coordinates: 34°23′17″N 111°39′14″E
- Country: People's Republic of China
- Province: Henan
- Prefecture-level city: Luoyang

Area
  - Total: 2,350 km^{2} (910 sq mi)

Population (2019)
  - Total: 435,700
  - Density: 185/km^{2} (480/sq mi)
- Time zone: UTC+8 (China Standard)
- Postal code: 471700
- Website: luoning.gov.cn

Luoning County (simplified Chinese: 洛宁县; traditional Chinese: 洛寧縣; pinyin: Luòníng Xiàn) is a county in the west of Henan province, China. It is under the administration of the prefecture-level city of Luoyang.

== Administrative divisions ==
Eleven towns:

- Chengguan (城关镇), Shangge (上戈镇), Xiayu (下峪镇), Hedi (河底镇), Dongsong (东宋镇), Xinghua (兴华镇), Madian (马店镇), Guxian (故县镇), Zhaocun (赵村镇, formerly Zhaocun Township 赵村镇), Changshui (长水镇, formerly Changshui Township 长水镇), Jingyang (景阳镇).

One ethnic township:

- Wangfan Hui Town (王范回族镇).

Six townships:

- Chengjiao Township (城郊乡), Xiaojie Township (小界乡), Luoling Township (罗岭乡), Dizhang Township (底张乡), Chenwu Township (陈吴乡), Jiankou Township (涧口乡).

Former Township:

- Shandi Township (山底乡).

== Climate ==
Climate data for Luoning, elevation 408 m (1,339 ft), (1991–2020 normals, extremes 1981–2010)
Month	Jan	Feb	Mar	Apr	May	Jun	Jul	Aug	Sep	Oct	Nov	Dec	Year
Record high °C (°F)	21.6 (70.9)	26.1 (79.0)	34.0 (93.2)	38.4 (101.1)	39.2 (102.6)	41.2 (106.2)	39.6 (103.3)	39.4 (102.9)	38.7 (101.7)	33.2 (91.8)	27.8 (82.0)	24.1 (75.4)	41.2 (106.2)
Mean daily maximum °C (°F)	6.6 (43.9)	10.1 (50.2)	16.1 (61.0)	22.8 (73.0)	27.2 (81.0)	31.0 (87.8)	31.6 (88.9)	30.1 (86.2)	25.7 (78.3)	20.5 (68.9)	14.3 (57.7)	8.6 (47.5)	20.4 (68.7)
Daily mean °C (°F)	0.8 (33.4)	3.9 (39.0)	9.5 (49.1)	15.7 (60.3)	20.5 (68.9)	24.5 (76.1)	26.2 (79.2)	24.9 (76.8)	20.1 (68.2)	14.5 (58.1)	8.1 (46.6)	2.7 (36.9)	14.3 (57.7)
Mean daily minimum °C (°F)	−3.4 (25.9)	−0.7 (30.7)	4.2 (39.6)	9.8 (49.6)	14.7 (58.5)	19.1 (66.4)	22.1 (71.8)	21.0 (69.8)	16.1 (61.0)	10.2 (50.4)	3.6 (38.5)	−1.6 (29.1)	9.6 (49.3)
Record low °C (°F)	−14.5 (5.9)	−19.4 (−2.9)	−8.4 (16.9)	−0.6 (30.9)	2.6 (36.7)	10.0 (50.0)	15.4 (59.7)	13.1 (55.6)	6.1 (43.0)	−1.9 (28.6)	−8.6 (16.5)	−14.4 (6.1)	−19.4 (−2.9)
Average precipitation mm (inches)	9.3 (0.37)	12.3 (0.48)	20.2 (0.80)	35.4 (1.39)	55.8 (2.20)	65.1 (2.56)	93.9 (3.70)	89.2 (3.51)	86.1 (3.39)	47.4 (1.87)	26.0 (1.02)	7.1 (0.28)	547.8 (21.57)
Average precipitation days (≥ 0.1 mm)	4.4	4.9	6.0	7.0	8.1	8.2	10.8	10.7	9.8	8.0	6.0	3.7	87.6
Average snowy days	5.1	4.1	1.7	0.3	0	0	0	0	0	0	1.7	3.4	16.3
Average relative humidity (%)	57	59	57	59	63	67	78	80	79	75	67	57	67
Mean monthly sunshine hours	133.6	134.3	171.5	194.5	205.2	195.8	176.4	163.3	140.2	138.2	137.8	146.1	1,936.9
Percentage possible sunshine	42	43	46	50	47	45	40	40	38	40	45	48	44
Source: China Meteorological Administration
