= Tokimeki/Tonari no Onna =

Single by Chatmonchy

from the album Kyōmei
- Released: 4 March 2015
- Studio: Greenbird Studio
- Genre: power pop
- Length: 3:47 ("Tokimeki"); 4:02 ("Tonari no Onna")
- Label: Ki/oon
- Songwriter(s): Akiko Fukuoka (Lyrics) Eriko Hashimoto (Music)
- Producer(s): Chatmonchy

Chatmonchy singles chronology
"Kokoro to Atama/Itachigokko" (2014)	"Tokimeki/Tonari no Onna" (2015)	"Majority Blues/Kienai Hoshi" (2016)

"Tokimeki" (ときめき, Heartbeat) and "Tonari no Onna" (隣の女, Next Door Woman) are songs by the Japanese rock band Chatmonchy. Both songs were released as a double A-side single on 4 March 2015. It was only single that released Limited edition with DVD. Both song also appeared on their sixth studio album, Kyōmei.

== Music video ==
The music video for "Tokimeki" was directed by Yasuhiko Shimizu, while "Tonari no Onna" was directed by NuQ. "Tokimeki" video features Chatmonchy eat strawberry and running toward heart shaped thing in red background. For "Tonari no Onna", music video features animated style with a nude woman who have a good career, then falling down.

== Track listing ==
All lyrics are written by Akiko Fukuoka; all music is composed by Eriko Hashimoto

CD
No.	Title	Length
1.	"Tokimeki" (ときめき Heartbeat)	3:47
2.	"Tonari no Onna" (隣の女 Next Door Woman)	4:02
3.	"Last Love Letter (Koji Nakamura Remix)"	3:42
Total length:		11:31

DVD
No.	Title	Length
1.	"Opening - Hatena" (live at ROCK IN JAPAN FESTIVAL 2014)
2.	"Shangri-La" (live at ROCK IN JAPAN FESTIVAL 2014)
3.	"Kokoro to Atama" (live at Zepp Diver City)
4.	"Yes or No or Love" (live at Zepp Diver City)
5.	"Henshin (Glider mix)" (live at Zepp Diver City)
6.	"Mangetsu ni Hoero" (live at Zepp Diver City)
7.	"Otomedan Recording Documentary"

== Personnel ==
Adapted from the single liner notes.

Chatmonchy

- Eriko Hashimoto – vocals, guitars,
- Akiko Fukuoka – bass guitar, vocals, chorus

Additional musicians

- Aiko Kitano – drums, chorus
- Hiroko Sebu – piano, synthesizer, chorus

Production

- Michifumi Onodera – recording, mixing
- Tsubasa Yamazaki – mastering
- Shojiro Watanabe – recording, mixing (track 3)

Artwork and design

- STOMACHACHE – illustration
- Takashi Takamori – design

== Charts ==
Year	Chart	Peak position
2015	Oricon	23

== Release history ==
Region	Date	Label	Format	Catalog
Japan	4 March 2015	Ki/oon	CD	KSCL-2609
Japan	4 March 2015	Ki/oon	CD+DVD	KSCL-2607
