= Kokuhaku (Idoling!!! song) =

Single by Idoling
- Released: 16 July 2008
- Genre: J-pop
- Label: Pony Canyon

Idoling singles chronology
"Snow celebration/Moteki no Uta"	"Kokuhaku"	"Shokugyō: Idol."

Kokuhaku (告白, Confession) is the third single by Japanese idol group Idoling. It was released both as a normal edition and limited edition CD + DVD, containing special content and rare footage of the group. Track 3 is only available on the normal edition release. Kokuhaku was used as the theme song of the Microsoft Windows Vista "Vista School" campaign. Its highest charted Oricon position was #9. As of early 2009, it is the highest-selling single by Idoling.

== Track listings ==
=== CD ===
1. Kokuhaku (告白, Confession)
2. Moteki no Uta ~season 2~ (モテ期のうた～season2～)
3. Moteki no Uta ~season 1.5~ (モテ期のうた～season1.5～) (Bonus track)
4. Kokuhaku (INST) (告白【INST】, Confession (Instrumental))

=== DVD ===
1. Special contents
