= Shangri-La (Chatmonchy song) =

Single by Chatmonchy

from the album Seimeiryoku
- Released: November 15, 2006
- Genre: Indie rock, power pop
- Length: 3:16
- Label: Ki/oon
- Songwriter(s): Kumiko Takahashi (Lyrics) Eriko Hashimoto (Music)
- Producer(s): Junji Ishiwatari

Chatmonchy singles chronology
"Renai Spirit" (2006)	"Shangri-La" (2006)	"Joshi Tachi ni Asu wa Nai" (2007)

"Shangri-La" (シャングリラ) is a song by Japanese rock band Chatmonchy. It was released on November 15, 2006 as the lead single of their second studio album Seimeiryoku. It was used as the ending for the anime Hataraki Man. The song charted at 6th on the Oricon chart, the highest singles chart position the band has achieved to date.

== Music video ==
Three girls wearing yellow raincoats, large glasses, and teal shorts jump on the variously colored rings on the floor at the beginning of the "Shangri-La" music video. As the guitar kicks in the girls start dancing. It then goes into a room where the band is playing, and soon the band is on the floor playing their instruments. The rest of the video switches from different scenes of the band playing and the girls dancing.

== Track listing ==
All music is composed by Eriko Hashimoto

No.	Title	Lyrics	Length
1.	"Shangri-La" (シャングリラ)	Kumiko Takahashi	3:16
2.	"Chiisa na Kirakira" (小さなキラキラ Small Sparkle)	Kumiko Takahashi
3.	"Mei Mei Hitsuji" (迷迷ひつじ A Strange Man)	Akiko Fukuoka

== Charts ==
Year	Chart	Peak position
2006	Oricon	6

== Release history ==
Region	Date	Label	Format	Catalog
Japan	15 November 2006	Ki/oon	CD	KSCL-1057
