= Shokugyō: Idol =

"Shokugyō: Idol."

Single by Idoling
- Released: November 19, 2008
- Genre: J-pop
- Label: Pony Canyon

Idoling singles chronology
"Kokuhaku"	"Shokugyō: Idol."	"Hannin wa Anata Desu♥/NA・GA・RA"

Shokugyō: Idol. (「職業:アイドル。」, "Occupation: Idol.") is the fourth single by Japanese idol group Idoling. It was released both as a normal edition and a limited edition CD + DVD. The normal edition contains in special trading cards in each copy, and the limited edition contains a DVD with live footage and behind-the-scenes filming. Its highest Oricon weekly chart position was #5, and it reached #3 on the December 1 daily chart. Track 2, Tokimeki DREAMing!!! was used as the image song for ROBO_JAPAN 2008, while track 3, Lemon Drop, was used as the ending song for the movie Pyokotan Profile.

== Track listings ==
=== CD ===
1. Shokugyō: Idol. (「職業:アイドル。」, "Occupation: Idol.")
2. Tokimeki DREAMing!!! (トキメキDREAMィング!!!)
3. Remon Doroppu (レモンドロップ, Lemon Drop)
4. Shokugyō: Idol. (Instrumental) (「職業:アイドル。」（インストゥルメンタル）, "Occupation: Idol." (Instrumental))

=== DVD ===
1. Tokuten 1-otakara ni Naru Kamo?! Dokidoki no Ni Kisei Ōdishon Kiroku Eizō (特典1お宝になるかも?!ドキドキの二期生オーディション記録映像, Privilege, may become a collector's item?! Exciting second live stage audition footage)
2. Tokuten 2 jaketto Seisaku - Igai na Butaiura Micchaku Eizō (特典2ジャケット製作・意外な舞台裏密着映像, Privilege 2 jacket production - surprising up-close behind-the-scenes footage)
