= Shambala, Xiangcheng County, Sichuan =

Shambala
- Town

Tibetan transcription(s)
  - Tibetan: ཤམ་བྷ་ལ་གྲོང་རྡལ།
  - Wylie transliteration: sham bha la grong rdal

Chinese transcription(s)
  - Simplified: 香巴拉镇
  - Traditional: 香巴拉鎮
  - Pinyin: Xiāngbālā Zhèn
- Location in Sichuan
- Coordinates: 28°55′51″N 99°48′03″E
- Country: China
- Province: Sichuan
- Prefecture: Garzê
- County: Xiangcheng
- Elevation: 2,888 m (9,475 ft)
- Time zone: UTC+8 (China Standard)
- Postal code: 513336100
- Area code: 0836

Shambala (Tibetan: ཤམ་བྷ་ལ, Wylie: sham bha la; Chinese: 香巴拉; pinyin: Xiāngbālā) is a town and the seat of Xiangcheng County, southwestern Garzê Tibetan Autonomous Prefecture, western Sichuan province of southwest China. Before 2005, it was called Samphel (Tibetan: བསམ་འཕེལ, Wylie: bsam 'phel, Chinese: 桑披; pinyin: Sāngpī).
