= Koi no Kemuri =

Single by chatmonchy

from the album Miminari (耳鳴り; Ringing Ear)
- Released: March 1, 2006
- Genre: J-pop, Rock
- Label: Avex Trax
- Songwriter(s): Eriko Hashimoto, Akiko Fukuoka
- Producer(s): Junji Ishiwatari

Chatmonchy singles chronology
"Koi no Kemuri" (2006)	"Renai Spirits" (2001)

Koi no Kemuri (恋の煙) is Chatmonchy's first single released under the label, Ki/oon. Released on 1 March 2006 in anticipation of Miminari (耳鳴り; Ringing Ear), Chatmonchy's first album.

== Track listing ==
All music is composed by Eriko Hashimoto, arranged by chatmonchy.

No.	Title	Lyrics	Length
1.	"Koi no Kemuri (恋の煙; Smoke of Love)"	Akiko Fukuoka
2.	"Yuge (湯気; Steam)"	Kumiko Takahashi
3.	"KimaranaiTURN (決まらないTurn; Undecided Turn)"	Eriko Hashimoto
