= Dongsong, Henan =

Dongsong 东宋镇
- County
- Location within Henan Location within China
- Country: People's Republic of China
- Province: Henan
- Prefecture-level city: Luoyang
- County: Luoning

Area
  - Total: 82.6 km^{2} (31.9 sq mi)

Population (2000)
  - Total: 26,506
  - Density: 321/km^{2} (831/sq mi)
- Time zone: UTC+8 (China Standard)

Dongsong (Chinese: 东宋镇) is a town in the west of Henan province, China. It is under the administration of Luoning County in the prefecture-level city of Luoyang. Dongsong was made a people's commune in 1958. It became a township in 1984. In 2011, Dongsong became a town.

== Administrative divisions ==
Villages:

- Dongsong (东宋村), Xi (西村), Zhangzhuang (丈庄村), Qijiagou (祁家沟村), Niuzhuang (牛庄村), Yaogou (么沟村), Zhou (周村), Jiayao (贾窑村), Dasong (大宋村), Xiaosong (小宋村), Fangli (方里村), Xiwu (西午村), Liuyu (流峪村), Ma (马村), Guo (郭村), Niefen (聂坟村), Baiyuan (柏原村), Yangshuwa (杨树洼村), Wangzhuang (王庄村), Guandong (官东村), Guanxi (官西村), Guannan (官南村), Dingzhai (丁寨村), Luowa (罗洼村), Shanzhuang (陕庄村), Xiahedi (下河堤村), Zhaiyan (宅延村), Zhonghedi (中河堤村), Beijiuxian (北旧县村), Shangsongyao (上宋窑村), Wangling (王岭村), Xiasongyao (下宋窑村), Shanghedi (上河堤村), Zhaoce (照册村), Hegou (河沟村), Miaoxia (庙下村), Nanjiuxian (南旧县村)
