= Dongsong Township =

Dongsong Township 洞松乡
- Township
- Location in Sichuan
- Coordinates: 28°45′23″N 99°48′15″E
- Country: People's Republic of China
- Province: Sichuan
- Autonomous prefecture: Garzê Tibetan Autonomous Prefecture
- County: Xiangcheng County
- Time zone: UTC+8 (China Standard)

Dongsong Township (simplified Chinese: 洞松乡; traditional Chinese: 洞松鄉; pinyin: Dòngsōng Xiāng) is a township under the administration of Xiangcheng County, Sichuan, China. As of 2018, it has seven villages under its administration.

== See also ==
- List of township-level divisions of Sichuan
