= Kumiko Takahashi (writer) =

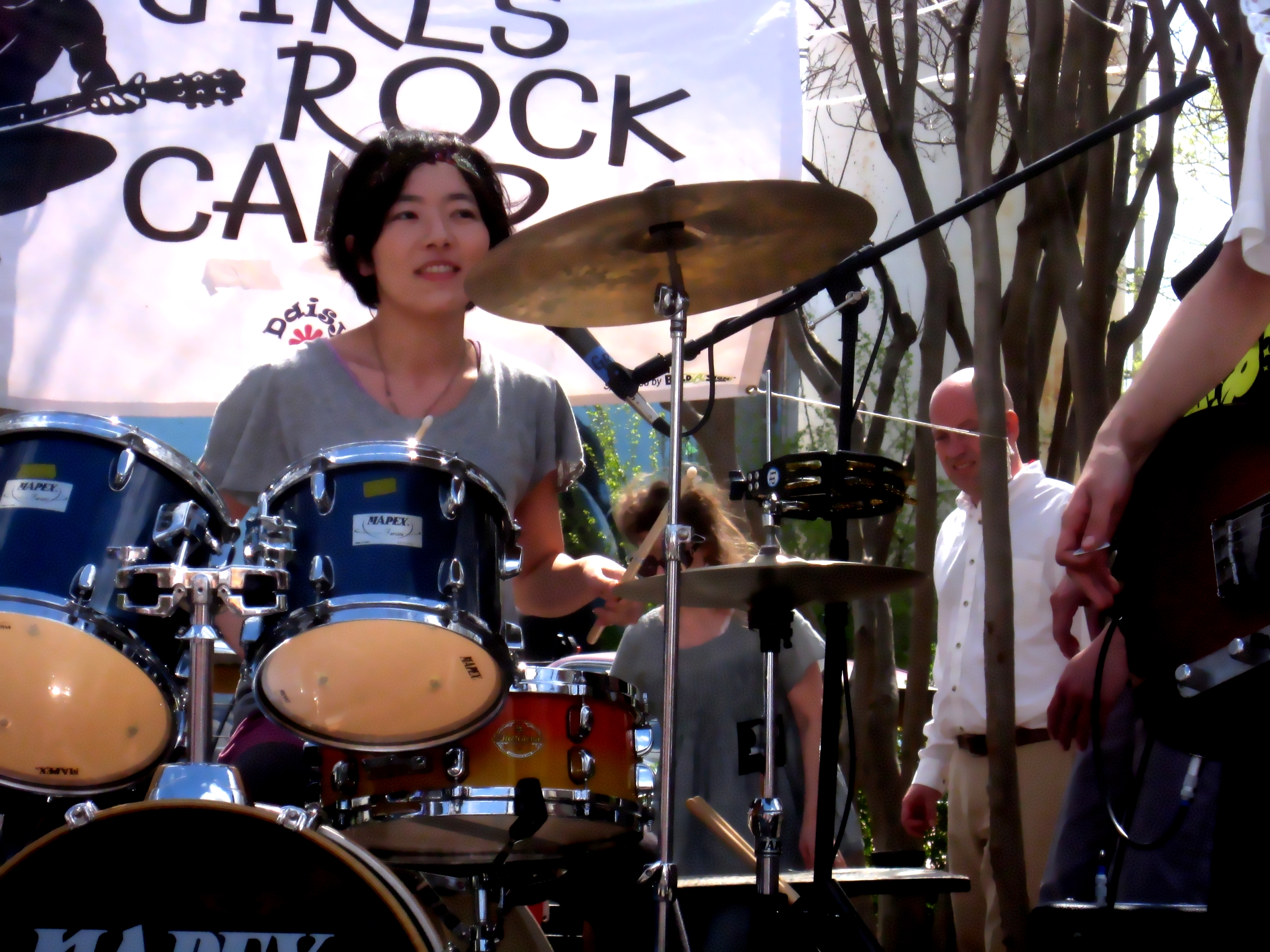
Kumiko Takahashi as a drummer in 2010.

Kumiko Takahashi (高橋 久美子, Takahashi Kumiko; born 1982) is a Japanese writer and former rock band drummer with the band Chatmonchy.

== Books ==
- The Sun Jumped Out Of The Universe (2010, poem)
- The House and the Desert (2012, poetry, short stories)
- Kumiko Takahashi go 1st small Edo Kawagoe history poetry of the journey (2013, statement, poetry)
- While Thinking, While Mourning, While Driving (2013)
- Hitonoyume and Kumiko Takahashi, Go! (2013, statement, poetry)
- Tomorrow's Rabbit (2015, statement)
