= Kokuhaku (album) =

Studio album by Chatmonchy
- Released: March 4, 2009

Chatmonchy chronology
Seimeiryoku	Kokuhaku	Hyōjō <Coupling Collection>

Kokuhaku (告白) is the Japanese musical trio Chatmonchy third album, released on March 4, 2009. It peaked at number 2 on the Oricon charts, and contained their single "Last Love Letter", which peaked at number seven on Oricon. The album was certified gold.

The band went on tour to showcase their new songs, and during this tour they played at the SXSW festival in Austin, Texas. After the success of the album, the band went on to participate in many cameos for popular anime shows, and movies. However, after the band finished one of their tours in 2011, Kumiko (drums/chorus) announced that she would be leaving the band, on friendly terms.

== Track listing ==
1. 8cm no Pin-heel 4:03
2. Hirahira Hiraku Himitsu no Tobira 3:50
3. Umi Kara Deta Sakana 4:34
4. Somaruyo 3:37
5. Cat Walk 4:34
6. Yodan 4:12
7. Hibiscus wa Fuyu ni Saku 3:09
8. Aimai na Kanjo 4:52
9. Nagai Mede Mite 3:43
10. Love is Soup 3:38
11. Kaze Fukeba Koi 3:41
12. Last Love Letter 3:22
13. Yasashisa 4:28
