= Henan =

Province in Central China

Henan 河南 Honan
- Province

Name transcription(s)
  - Chinese: 河南省 (Hénán shěng)
  - Abbreviation: HA / HEN / 豫 (Yù)
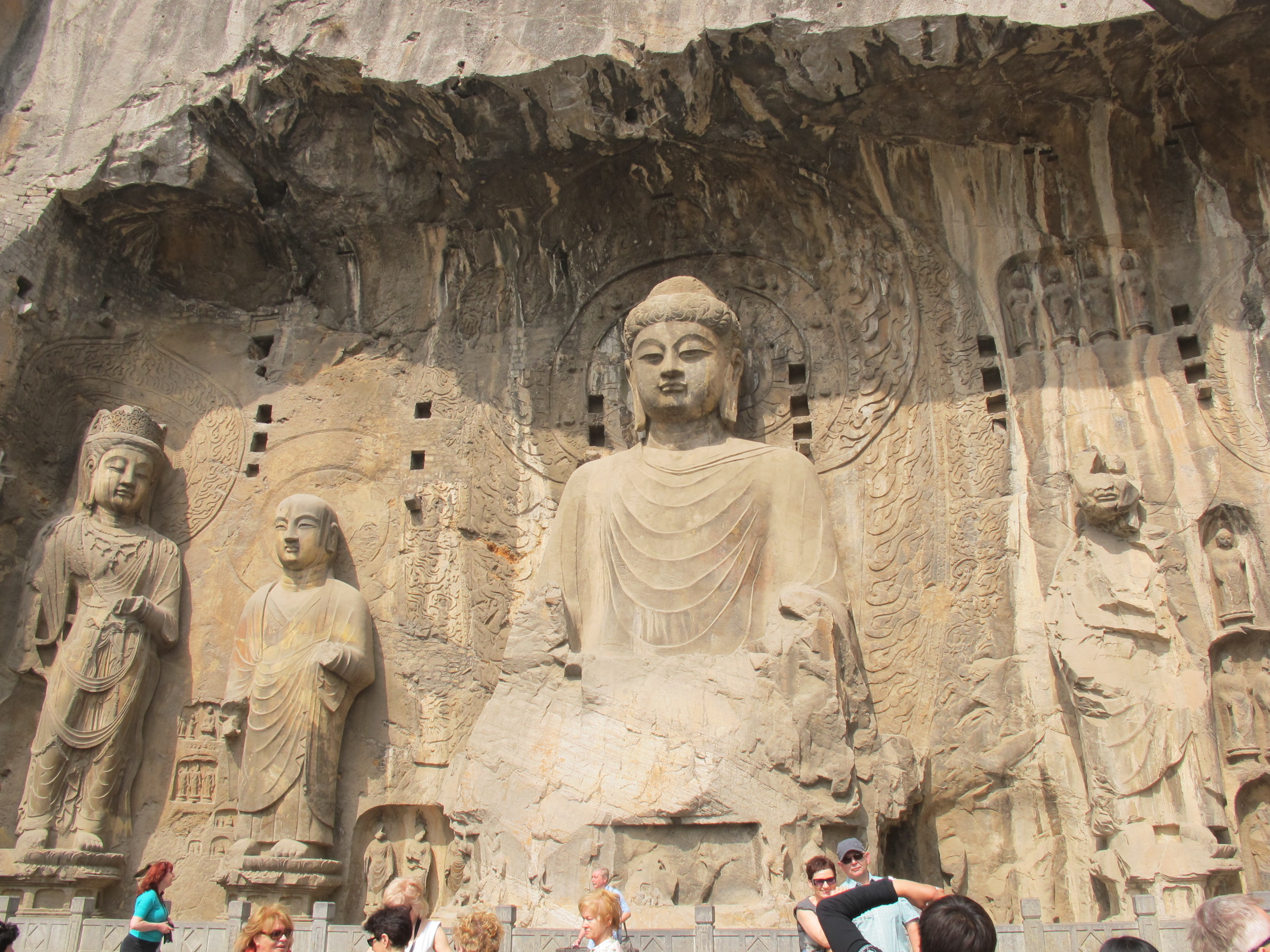
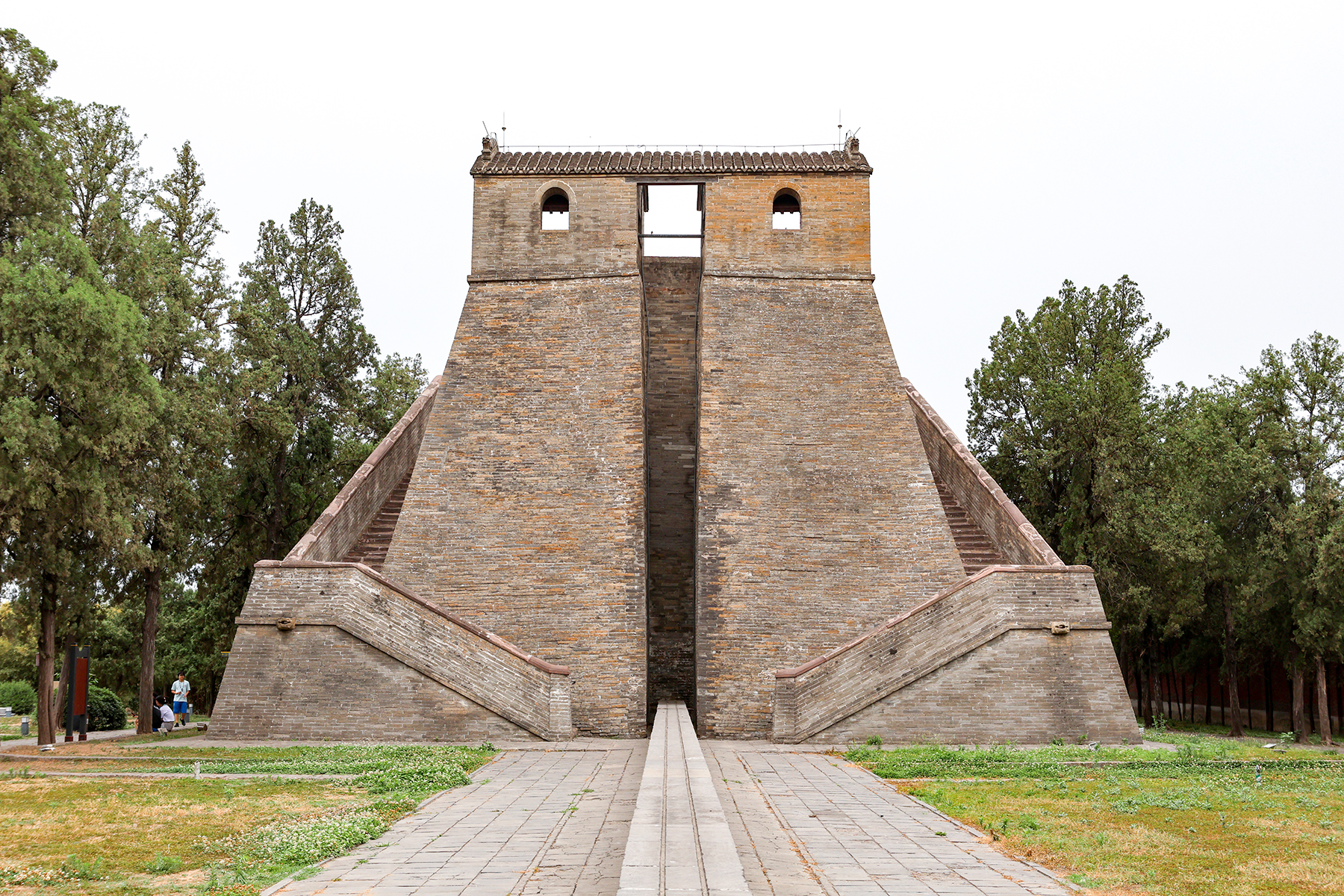
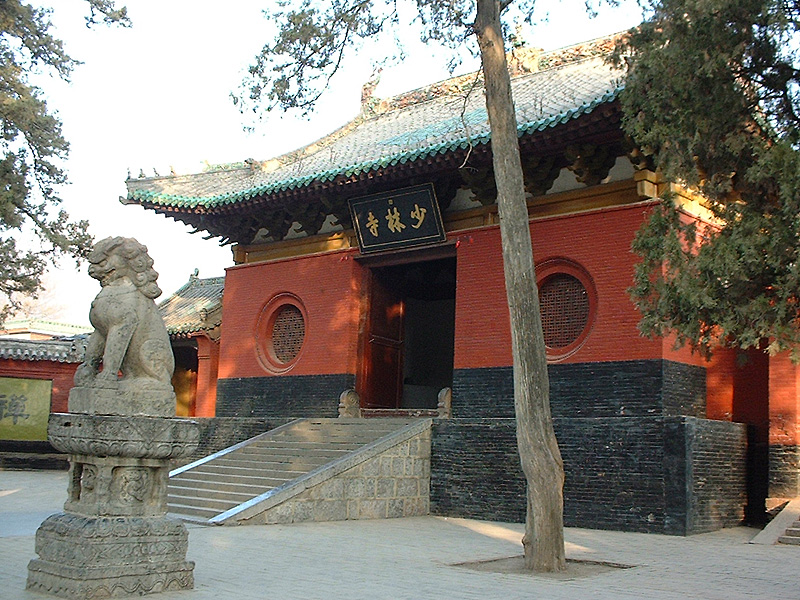
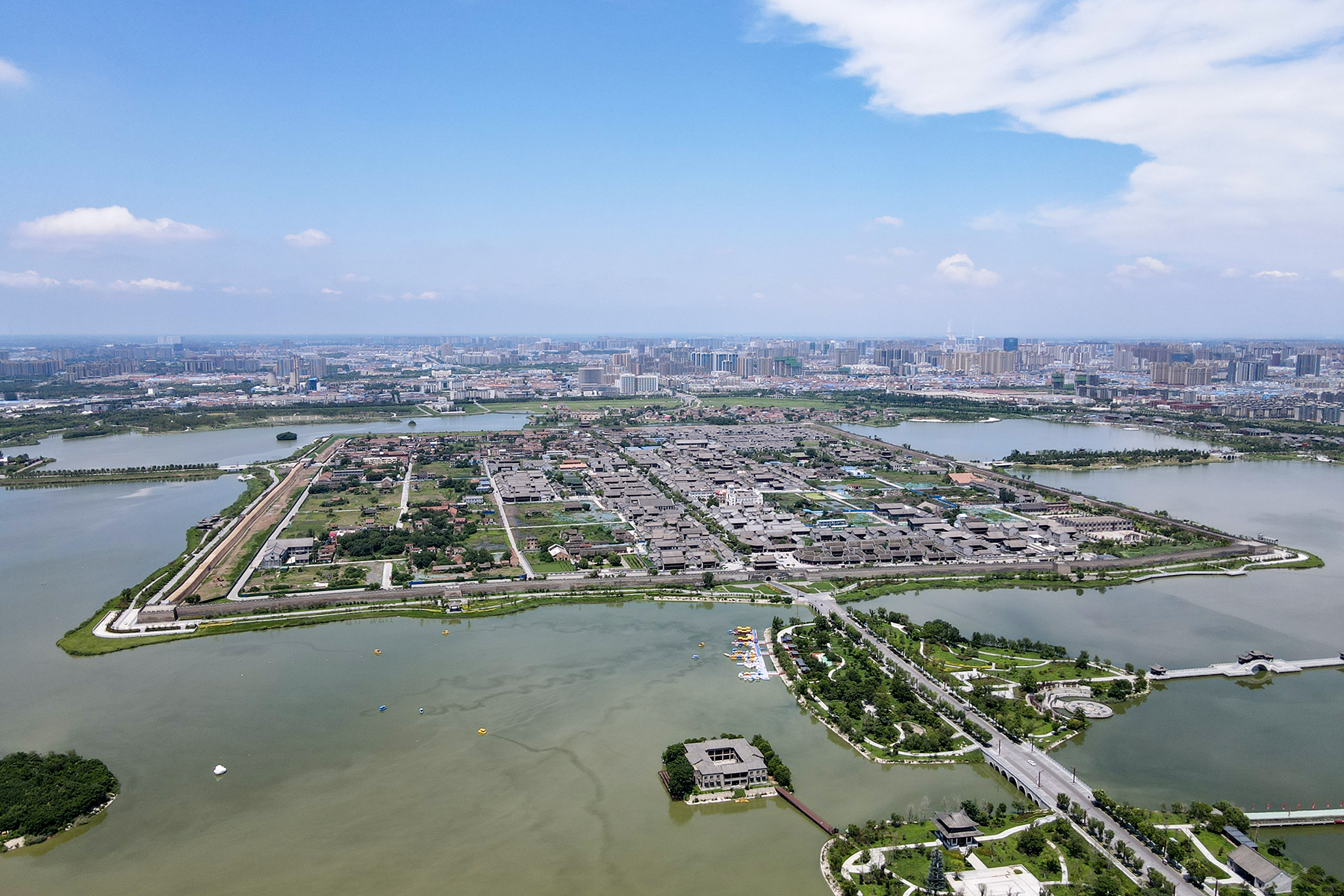
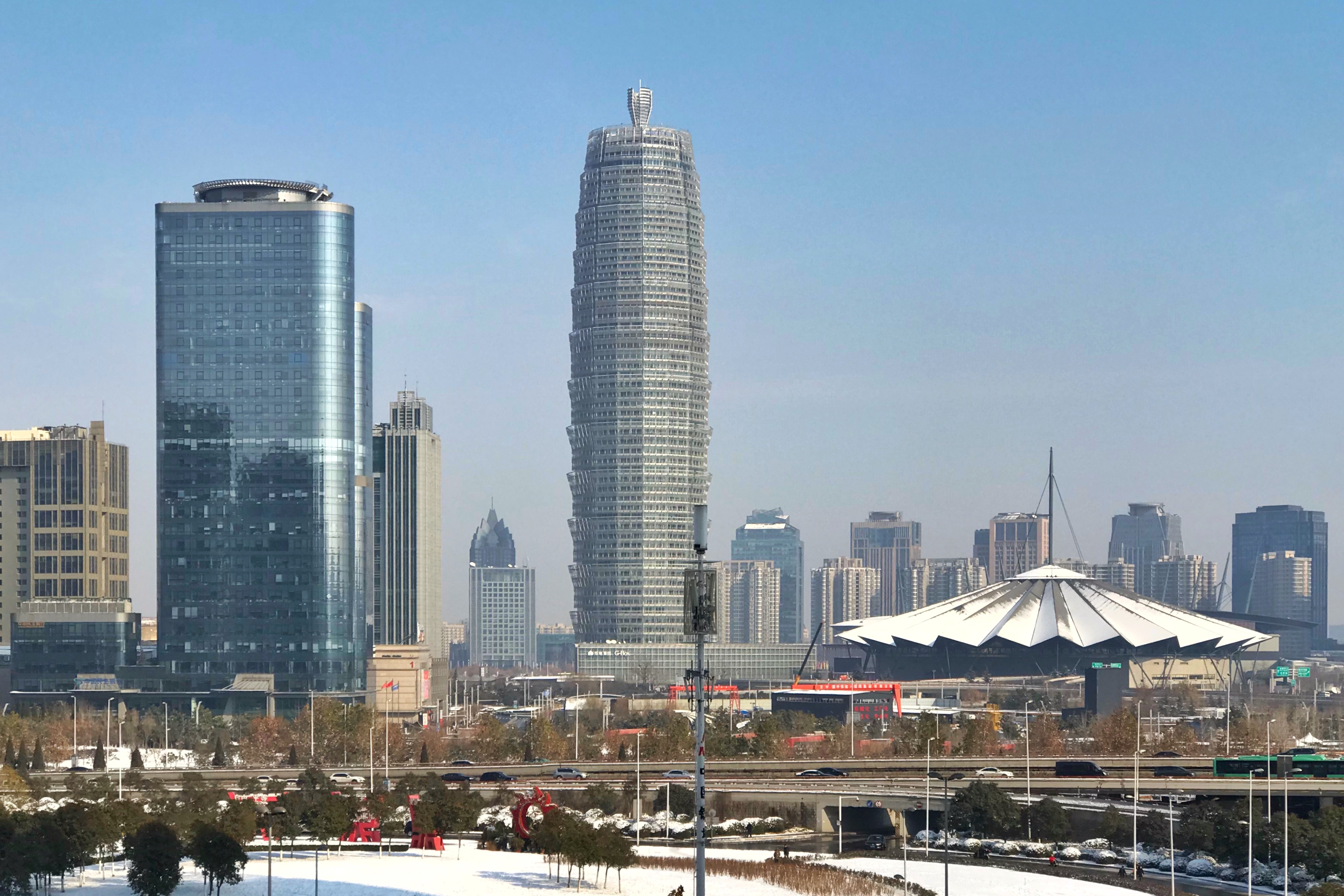
- Longmen Grottoes, Luoyang Gaocheng Astronomical Observatory Shaolin Temple, Dengfeng Historic center in Shangqiu Zhengdong New Area in Zhengzhou

- Location of Henan in China
- Country: China
- Named for: 河 hé – Yellow River; 南 nán – south; "south of the Yellow River"
- Capital (and largest city): Zhengzhou
- Divisions: 17 prefectures, 159 counties, 2,455 townships

Government
  - Type: Province
  - Body: Henan Provincial People's Congress
  - Party Secretary: Zhou Zuyi
  - Congress Chairman: Liu Ning
  - Governor: Wang Lujin (acting)
  - CPPCC Chairman: Kong Changsheng
  - National People's Congress Representation: 174 deputies

Area
  - Total: 167,000 km^{2} (64,000 sq mi)
  - Rank: 17th
- Highest elevation (Laoyachanao): 2,413.8 m (7,919 ft)

Population (2020)
  - Total: 99,365,519
  - Rank: 3rd
  - Density: 595/km^{2} (1,540/sq mi)
  - Rank: 7th

Demographics
  - Ethnic composition: Han: 98.6%; Others: 1.4%
  - Languages and dialects: Central Plains Mandarin; Jin

GDP (2023)
  - Total: CN¥5,913 billion (6th) (US$839 billion)
  - Per capita: CN¥60,073 (25th) (US$8,525)
- ISO 3166 code: CN-HA
- HDI (2023): 0.769 (25th) – high
- Website: henan.gov.cn

Henan
- "Henan" in Chinese characters
- Chinese: 河南
- Postal: Honan
- Literal meaning: South of the Yellow River
Transcriptions
Standard Mandarin
- Hanyu Pinyin: Hénán
- Bopomofo: ㄏㄜˊ ㄋㄢˊ
- Wade–Giles: Ho^{2}-nan^{2}
- IPA: [xɤ̌.nǎn]
other Mandarin
- Xiao'erjing: حېناًنْ
Wu
- Suzhounese: Ghou^{2}-noe^{2}
Yue: Cantonese
- Yale Romanization: Hòh-nàahm
- Jyutping: Ho4-naam4
- IPA: [hɔ˩.nam˩]
Southern Min
- Tâi-lô: Hô-lâm

Abbreviation
- Chinese: 豫
Transcriptions
Standard Mandarin
- Hanyu Pinyin: Yù
- Bopomofo: ㄩˋ
- Wade–Giles: Yü^{4}
- IPA: [ŷ]
other Mandarin
- Xiao'erjing: يُو
Yue: Cantonese
- Yale Romanization: Yuh
- Jyutping: Jyu6
- IPA: [jy˨]

Henan (Note: UK: /hɜːˈnæn/; or /həˈnæn/; US: /hʌˈnɑːn/; meaning 'south of the river'; alternatively Honan) is a province in Central China. Henan is China's third-most populous province and the most populous among inland provinces, with a population of over 99 million as of 2020. The area around Henan was historically known as the Central Plains (Zhongyuan) and is considered the core region of Chinese cultural history. Four of the historical capitals of China, Luoyang, Anyang, Kaifeng and Zhengzhou, are in Henan.

Henan has the 5th-largest provincial economy in China, the largest in Central China and among inland provinces, with a nominal GDP of CN¥5.88 trillion (US$926 billion) in 2021, surpassing that of Turkey (US$815 billion). If it were a country, it would be the 18th-largest economy by nominal GDP as of 2021.

== Name ==
"Henan" literally translates to "South of the River" in English. In this context, "He" (河) specifically refers to the Yellow River, and "Nan" (南) means south. However, due to the changing course of the Yellow River and administrative redivisions, about one-quarter of Henan Province's territory is now located north of the river.

"Yu" (豫) is the administrative abbreviation for Henan Province. Historically, during the ancient "Nine countries" (九州) system in China, this region was known as Yuzhou (豫州). The character "Yu" (豫) originally meant "comfort". In archaic China, this region was still home to elephants, which is why it was given this name.

== History ==
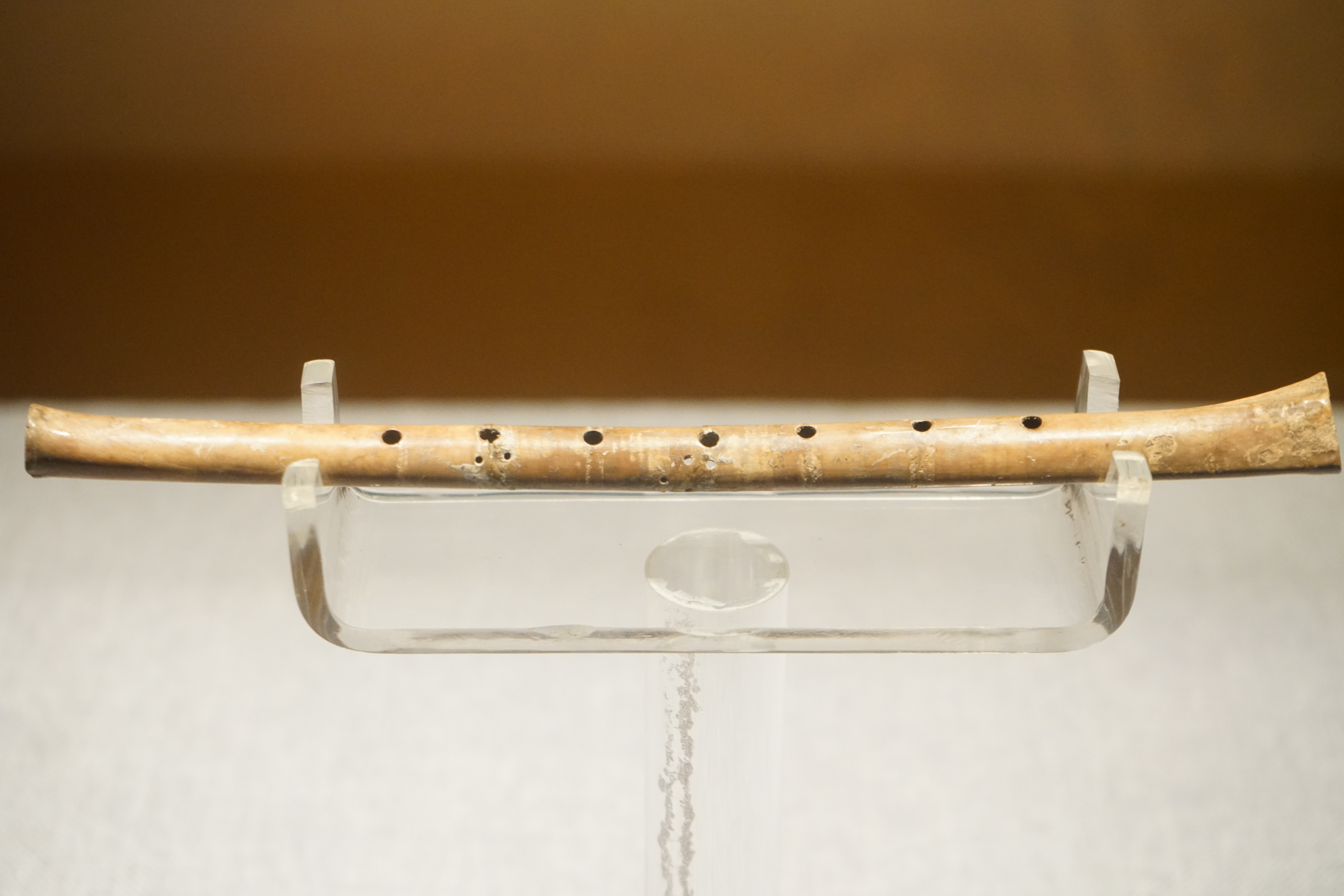
Jiahu Gudi, Wuyang County

Regarded as the cradle of ancient Chinese culture, Henan is known for its historical prosperity and periodic downturns. The economic prosperity resulted from its somewhat fertile plains and its location at the heart of the country. Its strategic location also means that it has undergone more wars compared to certain other regions in China. The floods of the Yellow River have caused damage from time to time.

=== Ancient states and dynasties ===
Archaeological sites reveal that prehistoric cultures such as the Yangshao Culture and Longshan Culture were active in what later is northern Henan since the Neolithic Era. The later Erlitou culture has been controversially identified with the Xia dynasty, the first and mostly legendary Chinese dynasty.

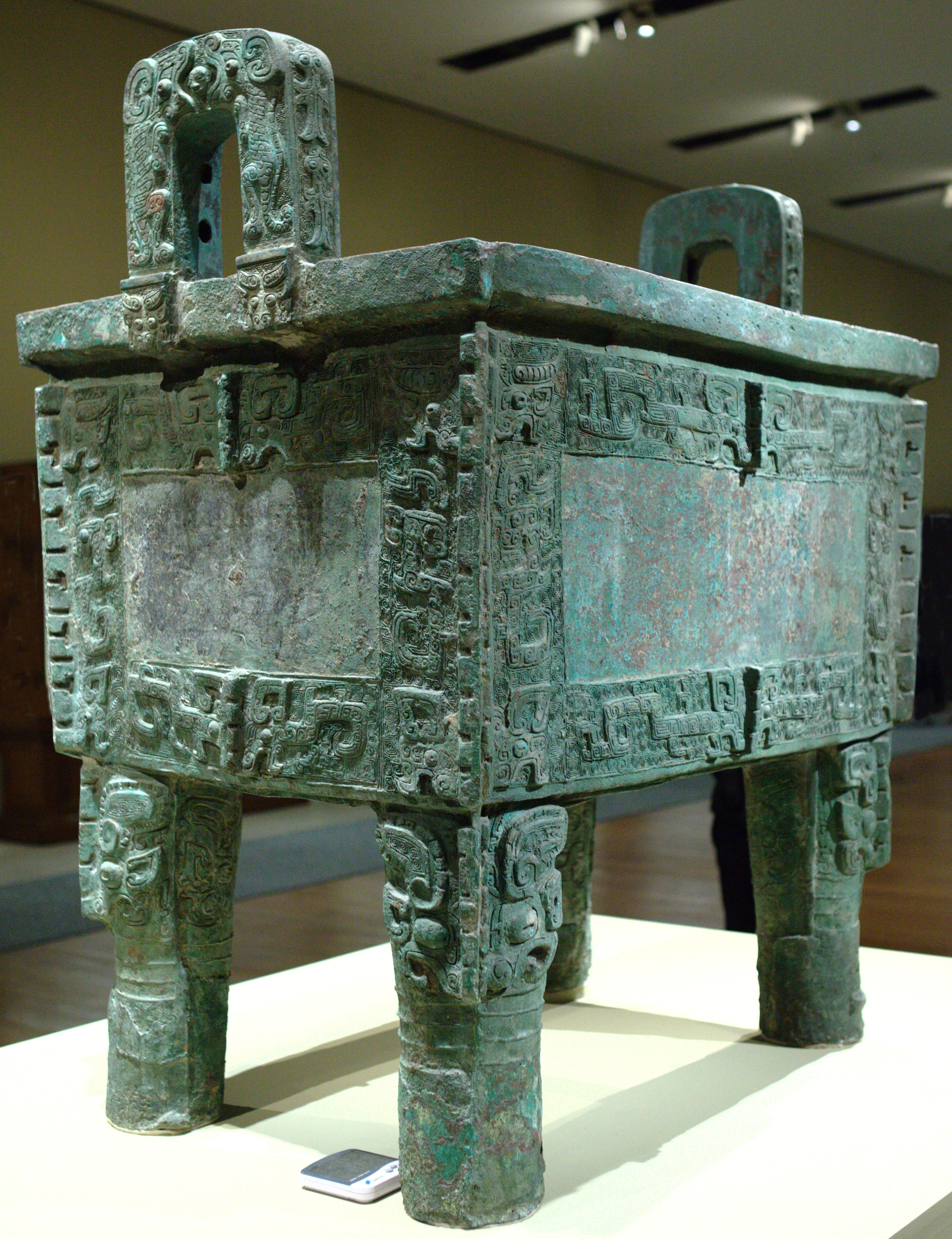
Hou Mu Wu Ding, late Shang Dynasty

The Shang dynasty (c. 1600 – c. 1046 BC) overthrew the Xia, with their capitals centered in Henan. The discovery of oracle bone scripts at the Yinxu site in Anyang provided invaluable insight into their writing, rituals, and social structure.

In the 11th century BC, the Zhou people arrived from the west and overthrew the Shang dynasty in the Battle of Muye. During the Western Zhou period (c. 1046 – 771 BC), the capital and political and economical center was moved away from Henan for the first time. The Spring and Autumn period, a period of warfare and rivalry, began in 721 BC. What later is Henan and all of China was several kingdoms, which are at war for control of the central plain. (逐鹿中原) While regarded formally as the ruler of China, the control that Zhou king in Luoyang exerted over the feudal kingdoms had virtually disappeared. Laozi, the founder of Taoism, was born in northern Chu, part of what later is Henan.

=== Imperial Era ===
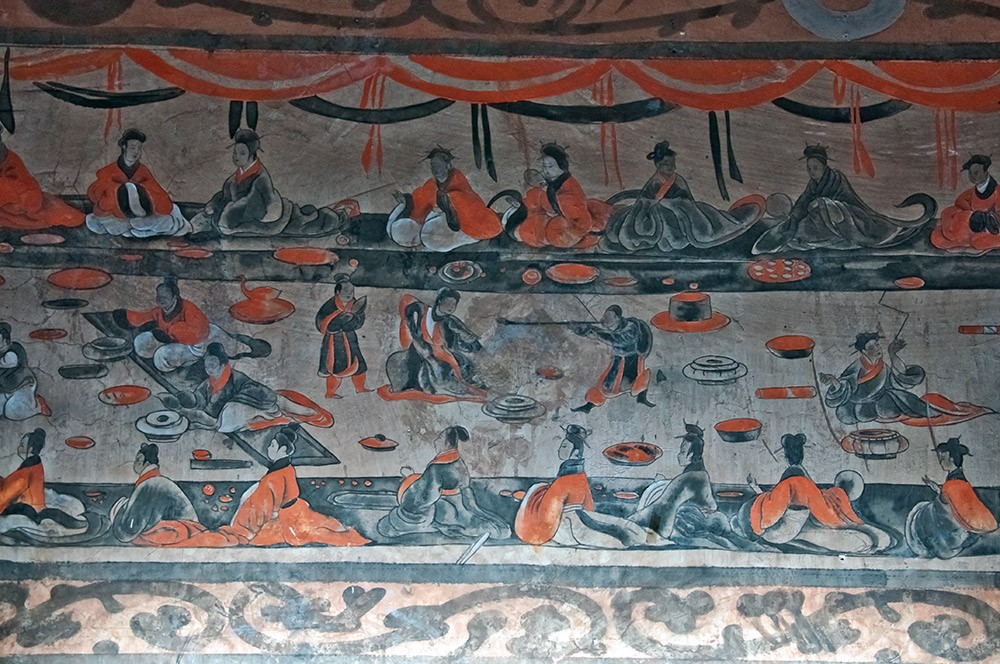
An Eastern Han (25–220 AD) Chinese tomb mural showing scenes of a banquet, dance and music, acrobatics, and wrestling, from the Dahuting Han tombs, on the southern bank of the Suihe River in Xinmi

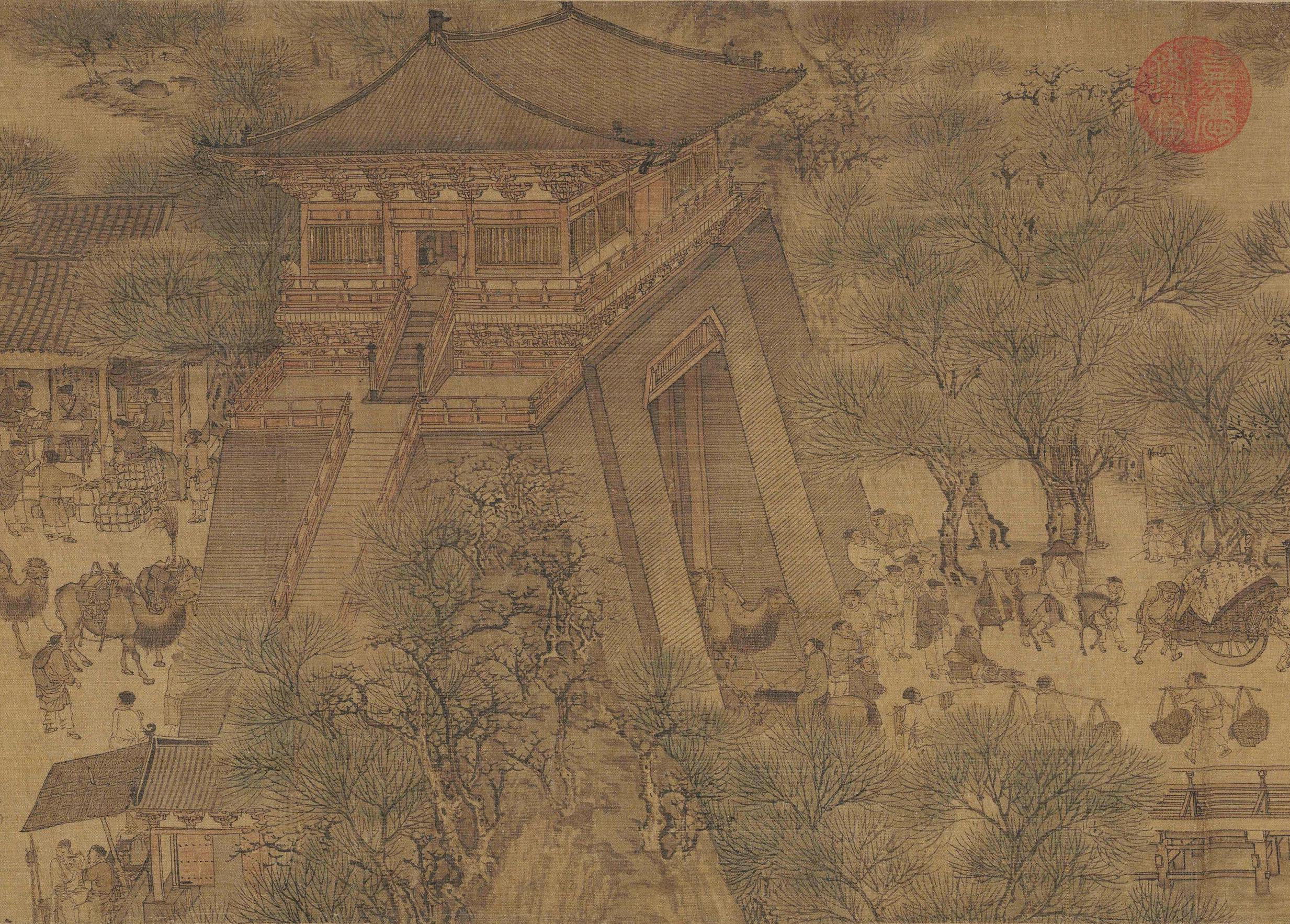
Kaifeng city gate in Along the River During the Qingming Festival

Qin Shi Huang conquered six kingdoms and unified China proper in 221 BC, and the Han Dynasty (206 BC–220 AD) made Henan Commandery. The empire made Luoyang its political and cultural heart.

Following the Han's fall, Henan entered a period of prolonged turmoil during the Three Kingdoms, Jin, and the Northern and Southern Dynasties (220–589 AD). The region changed hands repeatedly among rival regimes. Despite the destruction, Henan continued to serve as a vital agricultural base and a melting pot of diverse ethnic groups and cultures in northern China.

The Sui dynasty reunified China in 589. Emperor Yang of Sui had the Grand Canal extended to Luoyang, but the massive expenditure of manpower and resources exhausted the populace, which ultimately led to the fall of the Sui empire.

The Tang dynasty lasted for three centuries before it eventually succumbed to internal strife. In the Period of Five Dynasties and Ten Kingdoms (907–960) that followed, Kaifeng in eastern Henan became the capital of four dynasties. The Song dynasty that reunified China in 982 also had its capital at Kaifeng. Under Song rule, Kaifeng overtook Luoyang and Chang'an as the largest city in China and in the world.

=== Conquests by Northern Peoples ===
In 1127, the Jurchens, a people from the northeast, captured Kaifeng and took the Song emperor prisoner. In 1194, the Yellow River changed its course, flowing southward into the Huai River through what is now northern Jiangsu, displacing millions of people. In the early 13th century, Mongols destroyed the Jin dynasty and conquered this region, establishing the Henan Jiangbei Branch Secretariat (河南江北行省).

Due to heavy casualties and mass migration caused by warfare and flooding, the Ming court under the Hongwu reign organized large-scale, compulsory resettlement from Shanxi to Henan. In 1368, the prefectures of Weihui (衛輝), Zhangde (彰德), and Huaiqing (懷慶)—areas north of the Yellow River—were placed under Henan's government. In 1641, the peasant rebel leader Li Zicheng captured Luoyang. The following year, Li's forces besieged Kaifeng three times. During the third siege, troops of Ming court breached the Yellow River dikes at Zhujiazhai and Majiakou north of the city in an attempt to flood the rebels. The waters inundated Kaifeng, submerging the entire city under several zhang of water. Of the city's 378,000 residents, only 30,000 survived.

The wars of the late Ming and early Qing (circa 1630–1663) once again devastated Henan. During the Kangxi reign, the province's agricultural economy recovered, and it gradually regained its status as a major population center and grain-producing region.

On 30 September 1887, a major Yellow River dike breach occurred at Xiayun Shibao in Zhengzhou (present-day Shiqiao Village, Huayuankou Town, Huiji District). The disaster claimed over two million lives (with estimates ranging from 930,000 to as high as 7 million). Xia Mingfang, a scholar of Qing history, called it "the most severe flood disaster in terms of population loss in modern Chinese history," while Peter Hough, professor of international relations at Middlesex University, described it as "one of the deadliest natural disasters in human history."

=== Modern time ===
The Qing dynasty was overthrown by the 1911 Revolution and then the Republic of China was established in 1912, during which a man from Henan, Yuan Shikai, played a role and thus became the first president of Republic of China.

In 1938, during the Second Sino-Japanese War, when the Imperial Japanese Army captured Kaifeng, the government led by Chiang Kai-shek bombed the Huayuankou dam in Zhengzhou in order to prevent Japanese forces from advancing further. This caused flooding in Henan, Anhui, and Jiangsu resulting in hundreds of thousands of deaths. In 1942 Henan was hit by the Chinese famine of 1942-43 resulting from a mix of drought, locusts and destruction caused by the war.

In 1954, the government of the People's Republic of China moved the capital of Henan from Kaifeng to Zhengzhou, as a result of its railway transportation importance. The PRC had earlier established a Pingyuan Province consisting of what later is northern Henan and western Shandong with Xinxiang as its capital. This province was abolished in 1952.

In 1958, Yashan in Suiping County, Henan, became the first people's commune of China, heralding the beginning of the "Great Leap Forward". In the subsequent famines of the 1960s, which are attributed to the Great Leap Forward, millions of people died in Henan. Suffering under famine and economic chaos caused by the Great Leap, locals in Henan offered resistance mostly through banditry. In 1959, a peasant uprising erupted and was defeated after twenty days of fighting.

A destructive flooding of the Huai River in the summer of 1950 prompted construction of dams on its tributaries in central and southern Henan. Some of the dams were not able to withstand the levels of rainfall caused by Typhoon Nina in August 1975. Sixty-two dams, the largest of which was the Banqiao Dam in Biyang County collapsed; flooding, spread over counties throughout Zhumadian Prefecture and further downstream, killed at least 26,000 people. Unofficial human life loss estimates, including deaths from the ensuing epidemics and famine, range as high as 85,600, 171,000 or 230 000.

In July 2021, rainfall caused flooding, killing 302 and damaging amounting to 82 billion yuan.

== Geography ==
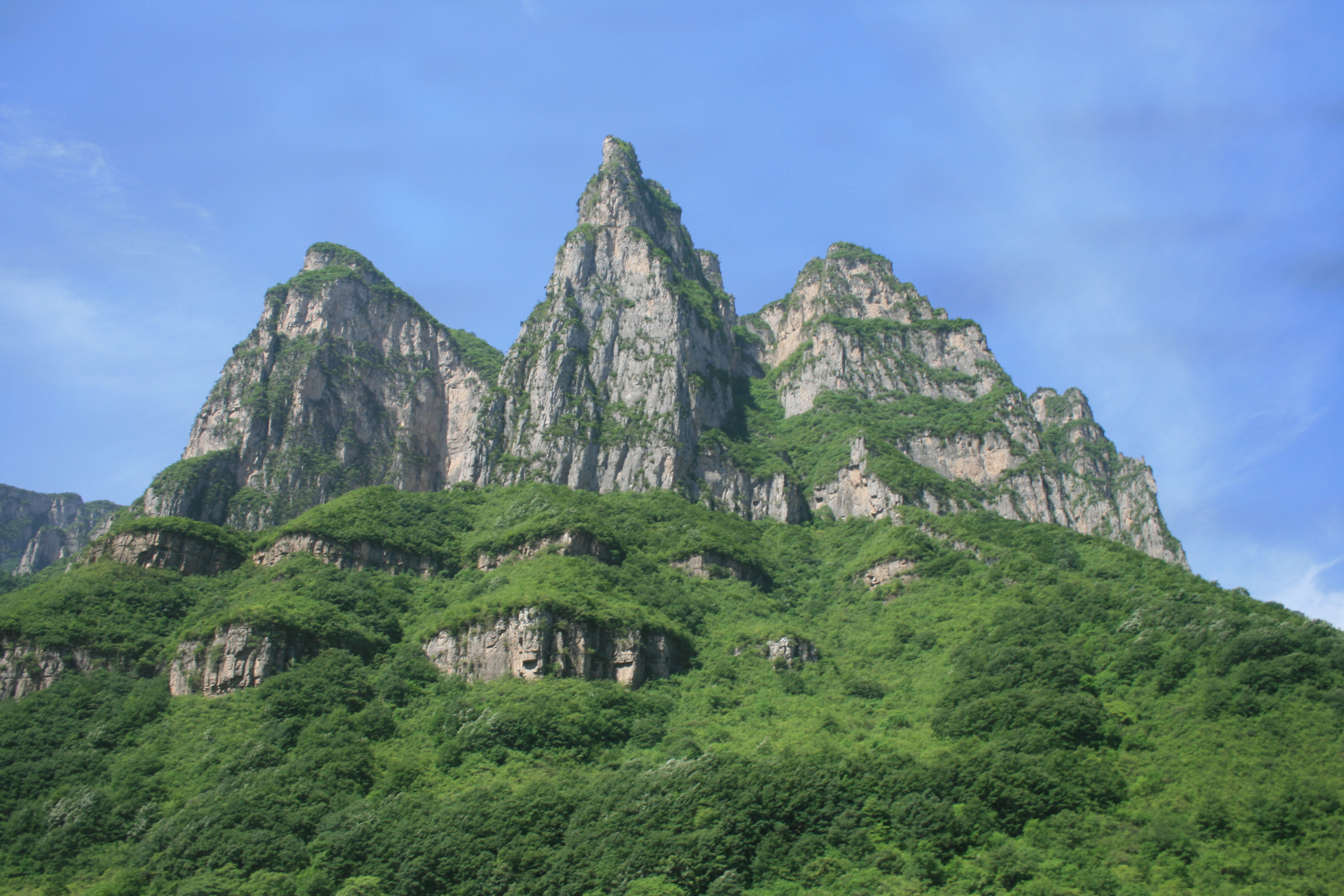
Yuntai Mountain, a part of Taihang Mountains

Henan's landscape include floodplains in the east and mountains in the west. Most of the province forms part the North China Plain, an area known as the "breadbasket of China". The Taihang Mountains intrude partially into Henan's northwestern borders from Shanxi, forming the south-eastern edge of Loess Plateau. To the west the Xionger and Funiu Mountains form a network of mountain ranges and plateaus, supporting one of the remaining temperate deciduous forests which once covered all of Henan. The Mount Song and its Shaolin Temple is located in the far east of the region, near the capital city Zhengzhou. To the far south, the Dabie Mountains divides Hubei from Henan. The Nanyang Basin, separated from North China Plain by these mountains, is another agricultural and population center, with culture and history distinct from the rest of Henan and closer to that of Hubei's. Unlike the rest of northern China, desertification is not a problem in Henan, while sandstorms are in cities near the Yellow River due to sand present in the river. At 2413.8 meters above sea level, the highest point in Henan province is Laoyachanao.

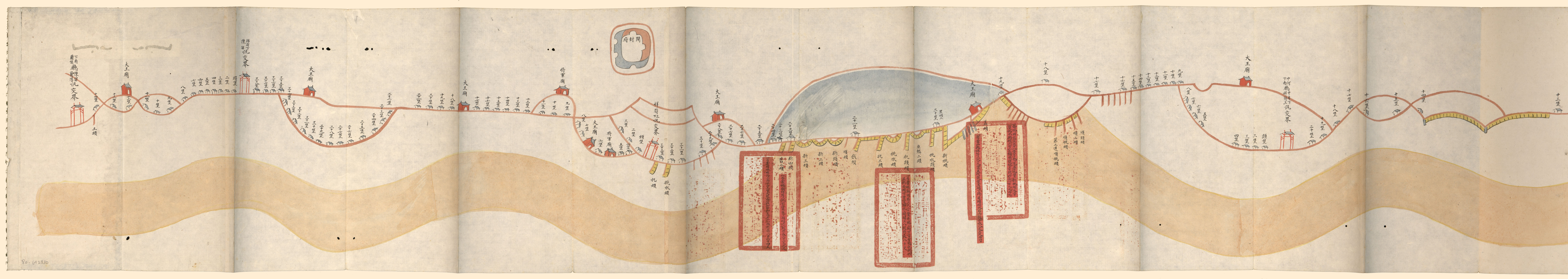
Map of the Yellow River water control system in Henan Province, 1876 (Guangxu 2nd year), watercolor and ink manuscript. Oriented with north to the bottom. Library of Congress.

The Yellow River passes through central Henan. It enters from the northwest, via the Sanmenxia Reservoir. After it passes Luoyang, the mountains gave way to plains. Sediments are formed due to the silt it picks up from the Loess Plateau, raising the river bed and causing floods which shaped the habitat of the region. Later, construction of dams and levees, and the depletion of water resources have ended the floods. The Huai River in southern Henan is another river, and has been recognized as part of the boundary dividing northern and southern Chinese climate and culture.

== Politics ==
=== Administrative divisions ===
Henan is divided into seventeen prefecture-level divisions: all prefecture-level cities; along with one directly administered county-level city (a sub-prefecture-level city):

Administrative divisions of Henan
Division code	Division	Area in km^{2}	Population 2020	Seat	Divisions		
Division code	Division	Area in km^{2}	Population 2020	Seat	Districts*	Counties	CL cities
410000	Henan Province	167,000.00	99,365,519	Zhengzhou city	54	82	21
410100	Zhengzhou city	7,532.56	12,600,574	Zhongyuan District	6	1	5
410200	Kaifeng city	6,260.95	4,824,016	Gulou District	5	4	
410300	Luoyang city	15,229.83	7,056,699	Luolong District	7	7	
410400	Pingdingshan city	7,909.42	4,987,137	Xinhua District	4	4	2
410500	Anyang city	7,354.11	5,477,614	Beiguan District	4	4	1
410600	Hebi city	2,136.85	1,565,973	Qibin District	3	2	
410700	Xinxiang city	8,249.45	6,251,929	Weibin District	4	5	3
410800	Jiaozuo city	4,000.89	3,521,078	Jiefang District	4	4	2
410900	Puyang city	4,187.90	3,772,088	Hualong District	1	5	
411000	Xuchang city	4,978.36	4,379,998	Weidu District	2	2	2
411100	Luohe city	6,260.95	2,367,490	Yancheng District	3	2	
411200	Sanmenxia city	9,936.65	2,034,872	Hubin District	2	2	2
411300	Nanyang city	26,508.69	9,713,112	Wolong District	2	10	1
411400	Shangqiu city	10,700.23	7,816,831	Liangyuan District	2	6	1
411500	Xinyang city	18,908.27	6,234,401	Shihe District	2	8	
411600	Zhoukou city	11,959.40	9,026,015	Chuanhui District	2	7	1
411700	Zhumadian city	15,095.30	7,008,427	Yicheng District	1	9	
419001	Jiyuan city**	1,893.76	727,265	Qinyuan Subdistrict			1
* – including Ethnic districts; ** – Directly administered county-level divisions (Jiyuan was formerly part of Jiaozuo)

Administrative divisions in Chinese and varieties of romanizations
English	Chinese	Pinyin
Henan Province	河南省	Hénán Shěng
Zhengzhou city	郑州市	Zhèngzhōu Shì
Kaifeng city	开封市	Kāifēng Shì
Luoyang city	洛阳市	Luòyáng Shì
Pingdingshan city	平顶山市	Píngdǐngshān Shì
Anyang city	安阳市	Ānyáng Shì
Hebi city	鹤壁市	Hèbì Shì
Xinxiang city	新乡市	Xīnxiāng Shì
Jiaozuo city	焦作市	Jiāozuò Shì
Puyang city	濮阳市	Púyáng Shì
Xuchang city	许昌市	Xǔchāng Shì
Luohe city	漯河市	Luòhé Shì
Sanmenxia city	三门峡市	Sānménxiá Shì
Nanyang city	南阳市	Nányáng Shì
Shangqiu city	商丘市	Shāngqiū Shì
Xinyang city	信阳市	Xìnyáng Shì
Zhoukou city	周口市	Zhōukǒu Shì
Zhumadian city	驻马店市	Zhùmǎdiàn Shì
Jiyuan city	济源市	Jìyuán Shì

These 17 prefecture-level cities and one directly administered county-level city of Henan are in turn subdivided into 157 county-level divisions (54 districts, 21 county-level cities, and 82 counties; the sub-prefecture-level city of Jiyuan is counted as a county-level city here). Those are in turn divided into 2454 township-level divisions (1181 towns, 598 townships, twelve ethnic townships, and 663 subdistricts).

Population by urban areas of prefecture and county cities
#	City	Urban area	District area	City proper	Census date
1	Zhengzhou	3,677,032	4,253,913	8,627,089	2010-11-01
2	Luoyang	1,584,463	1,926,079	6,549,941	2010-11-01
3	Xinxiang	918,078	1,047,088	5,708,191	2010-11-01
4	Anyang	908,129	1,146,839	5,173,188	2010-11-01
5	Nanyang	899,899	1,811,812	10,263,660	2010-11-01
6	Pingdingshan	855,130	1,034,042	4,904,701	2010-11-01
7	Kaifeng (Note: New district established after census: Xiangfu (Kaifeng County). The new district not included in the urban area and district area count of the pre-expanded city.)	725,573	896,117	4,676,483	2010-11-01
(7)	Kaifeng (new district)	168,569	698,799	see Kaifeng	2010-11-01
8	Jiaozuo	702,527	865,413	3,540,101	2010-11-01
9	Xinyang	625,302	1,230,042	6,109,106	2010-11-01
10	Shangqiu	618,549	1,536,392	7,362,975	2010-11-01
11	Luohe	575,956	1,294,974	2,544,266	2010-11-01
12	Hebi	477,659	634,721	1,569,208	2010-11-01
13	Xuchang (Note: New district established after census: Jian'an (Xuchang County). The new district not included in the urban area and district area count of the pre-expanded city.)	466,341	498,087	4,307,488	2010-11-01
(13)	Xuchang (new district)	208,168	767,449	see Xuchang	2010-11-01
14	Puyang	465,980	655,674	3,598,740	2010-11-01
15	Zhumadian	447,559	721,723	7,231,234	2010-11-01
16	Dengzhou	415,082	1,468,157	see Nanyang	2010-11-01
17	Yongcheng	414,312	1,240,382	see Shangqiu	2010-11-01
18	Yuzhou	372,815	1,131,896	see Xuchang	2010-11-01
19	Gongyi	366,265	807,911	see Zhengzhou	2010-11-01
20	Xinmi	359,148	797,256	see Zhengzhou	2010-11-01
21	Xiangcheng	355,449	1,003,698	see Zhoukou	2010-11-01
22	Xinzheng	337,356	758,128	see Zhengzhou	2010-11-01
23	Jiyuan	334,697	675,757	675,757	2010-11-01
24	Linzhou	321,755	789,702	see Anyang	2010-11-01
25	Zhoukou	308,360	505,171	8,953,793	2010-11-01
26	Yanshi	300,743	666,696	see Luoyang	2010-11-01
27	Ruzhou	296,913	927,934	see Pingdingshan	2010-11-01
28	Dengfeng	293,028	668,637	see Zhengzhou	2010-11-01
29	Sanmenxia (Note: New district established after census: Shanzhou (Shanxian County). The new district not included in the urban area and district area count of the pre-expanded city.)	285,153	325,628	2,234,018	2010-11-01
(29)	Sanmenxia (new district)	118,388	343,679	see Sanmenxia	2010-11-01
30	Changge	281,578	687,130	see Xuchang	2010-11-01
31	Xingyang	269,655	613,804	see Zhengzhou	2010-11-01
32	Huixian	261,767	740,435	see Xinxiang	2010-11-01
33	Lingbao	231,101	721,049	see Sanmenxia	2010-11-01
34	Qinyang	223,647	367,113	see Jiaozuo	2010-11-01
35	Weihui	167,454	495,744	see Xinxiang	2010-11-01
36	Wugang	147,521	313,828	see Pingdingshan	2010-11-01
37	Mengzhou	138,393	447,701	see Jiaozuo	2010-11-01
38	Yima	136,461	144,779	see Sanmenxia	2010-11-01

Most populous cities in Henan Source: China Urban Construction Statistical Yearbook 2018 Urban Population and Urban Temporary Population
Rank		Pop.	Rank		Pop.
1	Zhengzhou	6,261,900	11	Luohe	610,300
2	Luoyang	2,359,800	12	Xinyang	609,200
3	Nanyang	1,604,700	13	Xuchang	565,800
4	Kaifeng	1,023,000	14	Zhumadian	513,800
5	Shangqiu	964,800	15	Sanmenxia	494,200
6	Pingdingshan	964,500	16	Hebi	490,200
7	Jiaozuo	801,000	17	Yongcheng	466,000
8	Xinxiang	789,600	18	Yuzhou	434,400
9	Anyang	760,000	19	Zhoukou	431,300
10	Puyang	611,400	20	Ruzhou	410,000

== Demographics ==
Historical population
Year	Pop.	±%
1912	28,518,000	—
1928	30,566,000	+7.2%
1936–37	34,290,000	+12.2%
1947	29,654,000	−13.5%
1954	44,214,594	+49.1%
1964	50,325,511	+13.8%
1982	74,422,739	+47.9%
1990	85,509,535	+14.9%
2000	91,236,854	+6.7%
2010	94,023,567	+3.1%

With a population of approximately 98.2 million, Henan is the third most populous Chinese province after Guangdong and Shandong. It is the fifth most populous sub-national division in the world. If it were a country by itself, it would be the twelfth most populous in the world, behind Mexico and ahead of the Philippines. The hukou system shows Henan as the most populous province in China with over 103 million people, as it counts the migrant Henanese laborers as residents of Henan, instead of the province they reside in. 85.14 million are considered permanent residents of their registered households.

Henan exhibits demographic statistics indicative of a late stage in the demographic transition model. It has a birth rate of 7.06, decreasing from 9.24 in 2020 and 12.70 in 2015, while an aging population possibly explains an uptick in the death rate to 8.00 from 7.05 in 2015, and its overall population is experiencing a decreasing natural growth rate, ticking into the negatives at -.94% in 2023. This, in combination with consistent out-migration, can explain Henan’s slower population growth. The life expectancy is 77.6 years, matching nationwide numbers. Most households in Henan have between 2–4 people. 64.47% of the population can be considered working age–between 15 and 64, with a gross dependency ratio of 54.4%. This is similar to national levels, as China has a glut of 20s-to-middle-aged people exactly within working age.

Henan hosts an urban population of 57.01 million, a 58% urbanization rate, below that of China’s national average of 67%. It is a jump from 2014 when the urban population was 43.45 million. This urbanization process can be mostly attributed to internal migration from rural areas within Henan as overall population grew by less than 2 million in that same time frame. Among Chinese provinces, Henan's per-capita GDP ranks 25 out of 31. Per-capita disposable income averages out close to the national statistic of 31.5k yuan, while regional discrimination persists against Henanese for being poor and association with criminality.

=== Population composition ===
98.8% of the population is Han. Populations of Mongols and Manchus exist in scattered rural communities, and urban centers. Along with Jiangxi, Henan has one of the most unbalanced gender ratios in China. As a result of the Chinese government's one-child policy (some parents do not want the only child to be female and abort the fetus), the gender ratio was 118.46 males for 100 females in 2000. Subsequently, aborting fetuses due to their female sex was banned in Henan and fines are issued for those who violate the law. The ratio decreased to 117.8 in 2010 and down to 108.4 in 2020. Daughter-only families receive an annual allowance from the government. Based on a 2009 British Medical Journal study, the ratio is over 140 boys for every 100 girls in the 1–4 age group; this might be an exaggeration, as some families with more than one child do not register their daughters to the hukou in order to escape fines. The National Bureau of Statistics of China reports that to have decreased to 100.57 in 2023, presenting a conflicting narrative from outside sources.

=== Employment ===
The government is an employer in Henan. Its largest sectors include manufacturing, public bureaucracy, education, and construction. This generally mirrors larger trends across China such as the CCP’s Made in China 2025 plan to keep Chinese manufacturing central to the global supply chain. Public administration is a sector umbrellaing public servant jobs such as social security and public management. It has employed fewer and fewer numbers year-over-year since 2020. In the public sector, reported numbers show urban employment is dominated by retail. This is reflected in gross regional product numbers by industry, with Henan’s largest value-added contributors from secondary (manufacturing) and tertiary (services) industry.

=== Religion ===
Religion in Henan (2012)
1. Non religious and traditional faiths (86.1%)
2. Buddhism (6.40%)
3. Protestantism (5.60%)
4. Catholic (0.50%)
5. Islam (1.30%)
6. Others (0.20%)

According to a 2012 survey, around 13% of the population of Henan belongs to organised religions, the largest groups being Buddhists with 6.4%, followed by Protestants with 5.6%, Muslims with 1.3% and Catholics with 0.5%.

Henan has the largest Christian population by numbers and percentage of any province of China, 6.1% of the province's population as of 2012, corresponding to approximately 7 million Christians. A 2009 survey reported the share of Christians to be 9.33%. In 2019, Communist officials demolished the True Jesus Church near Zhumadian. In 2020, Communist officials demolished the Sunzhuang Church.

The reports did not give figures for other types of religion; 86% of the population may be either irreligious or involved in worship of nature deities, Confucianism, Taoism and folk religious sects (for example, a sect that is endogenous to Henan is the Tianxian miaodao). According to a 2007 survey, approximately 8% of the Henanese believe in and are involved in ancestor veneration, the traditional Chinese religion of the lineages organised into lineage churches and ancestral shrines.

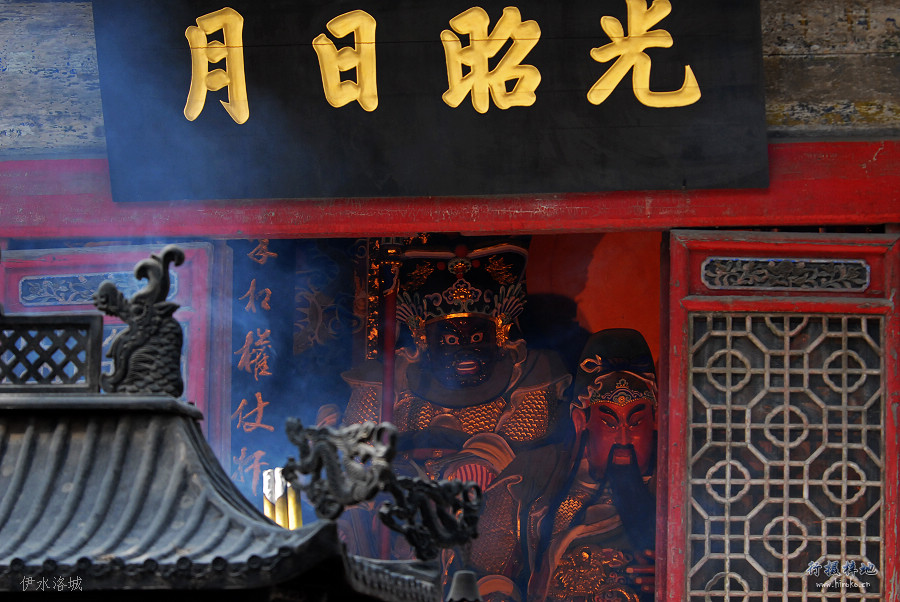
Detail with incense burner at the Guanlin, Temple Mausoleum of Guandi in Luoyang.

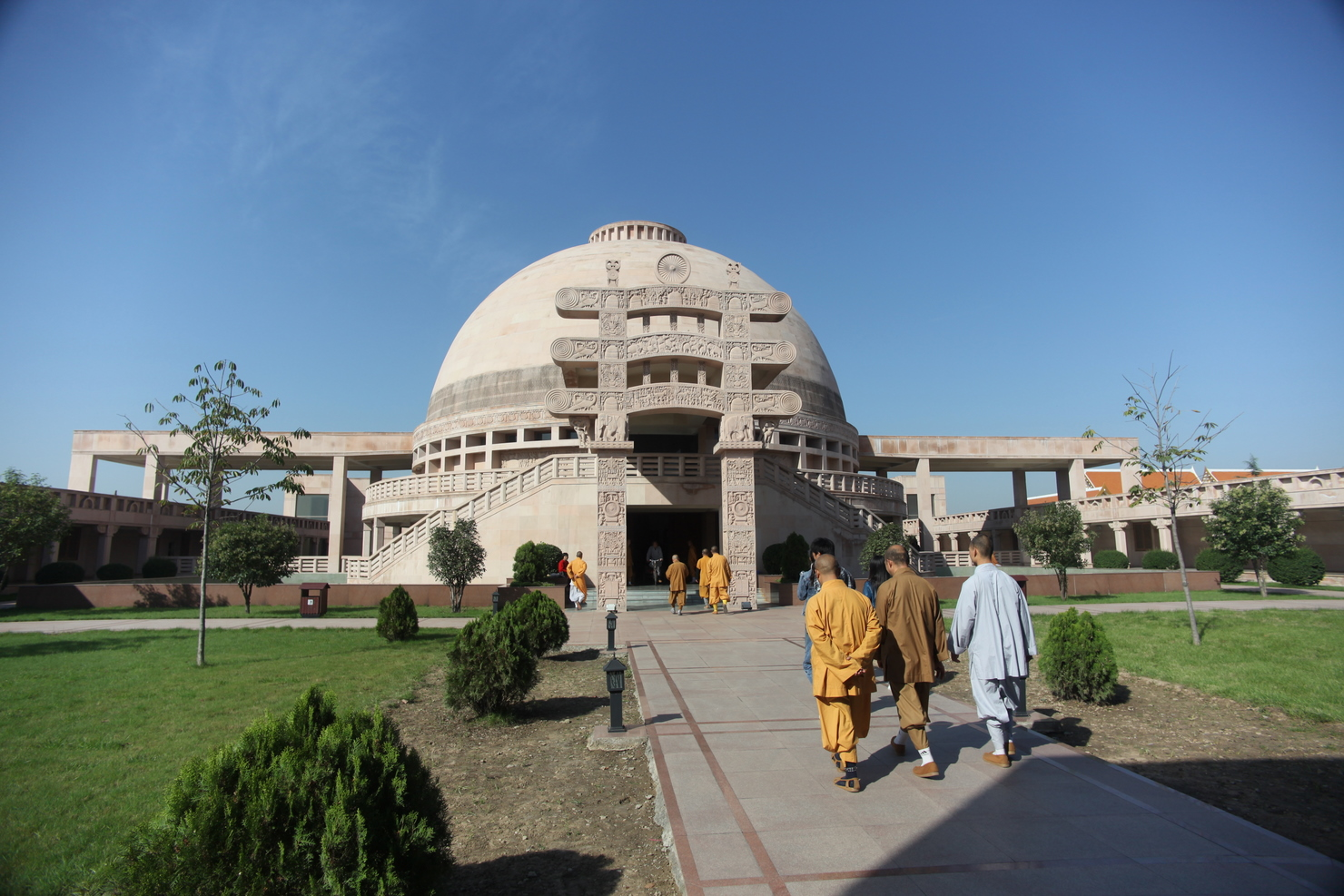
Indian stupa of the White Horse Temple, the first Buddhist temple in China.

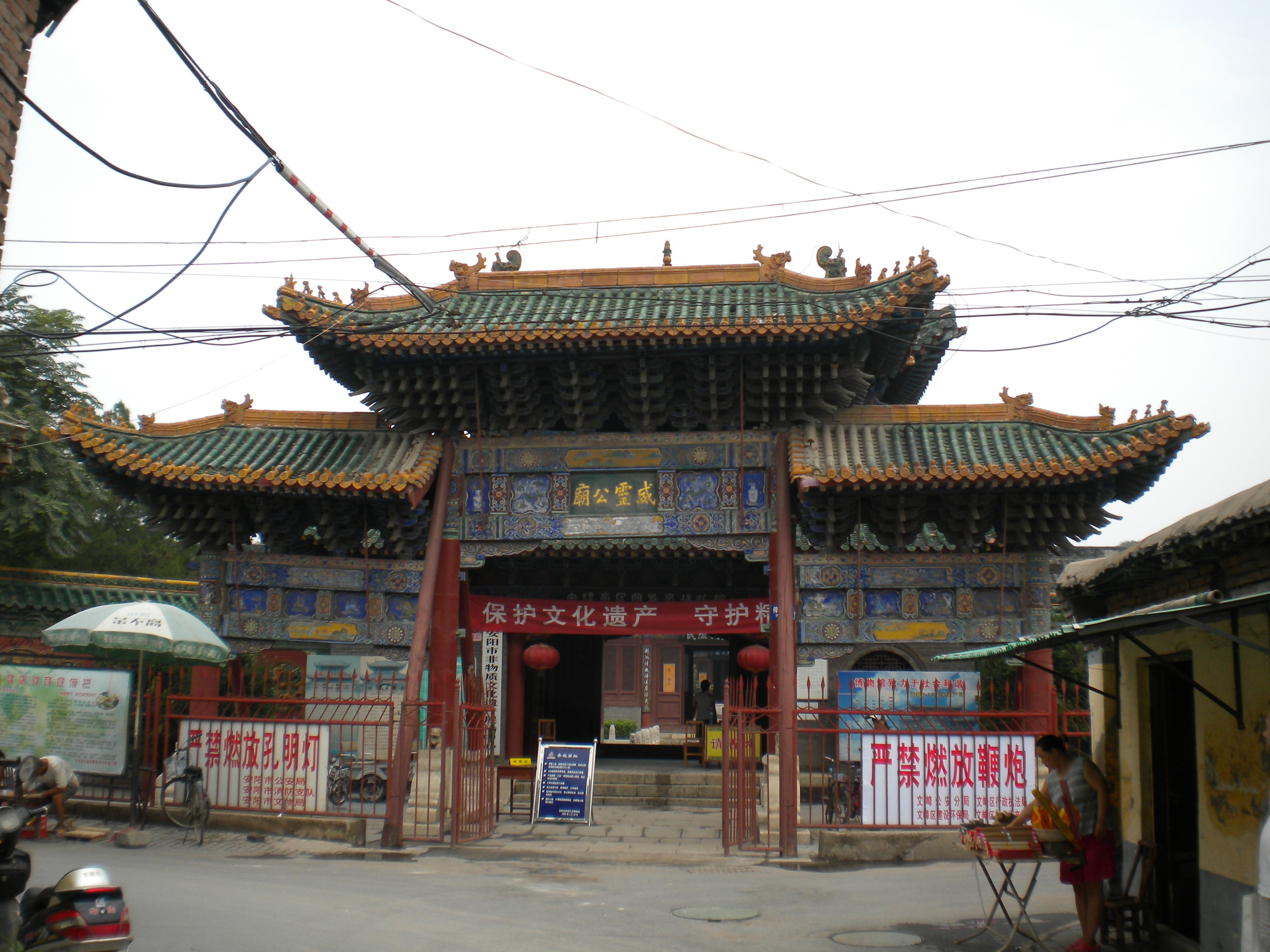
Temple of the Chenghuangshen (City God) of Anyang.

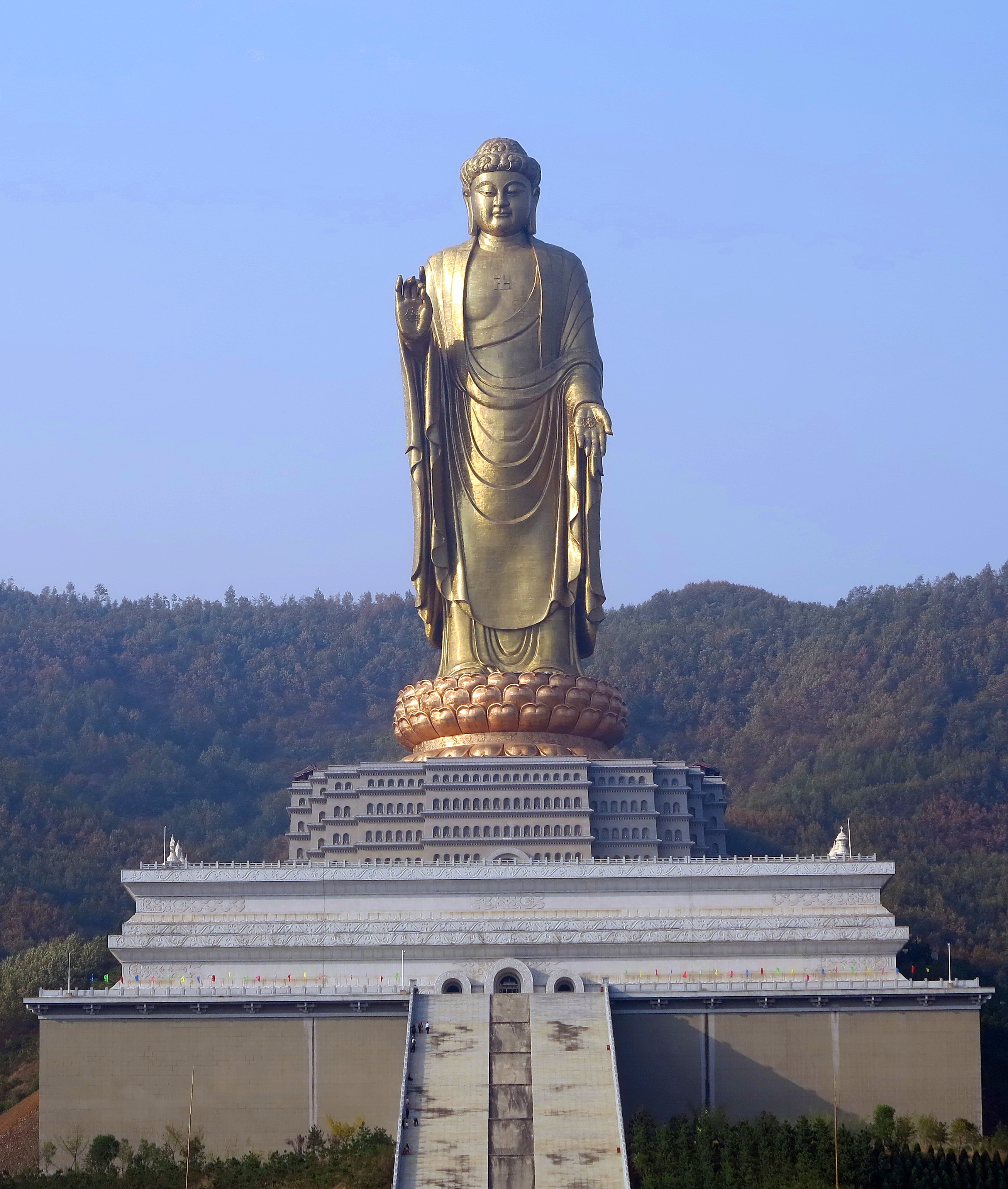
The Zhongyuan Great Buddha of the Temple of the Spring in Lushan is the second tallest statue in the world.

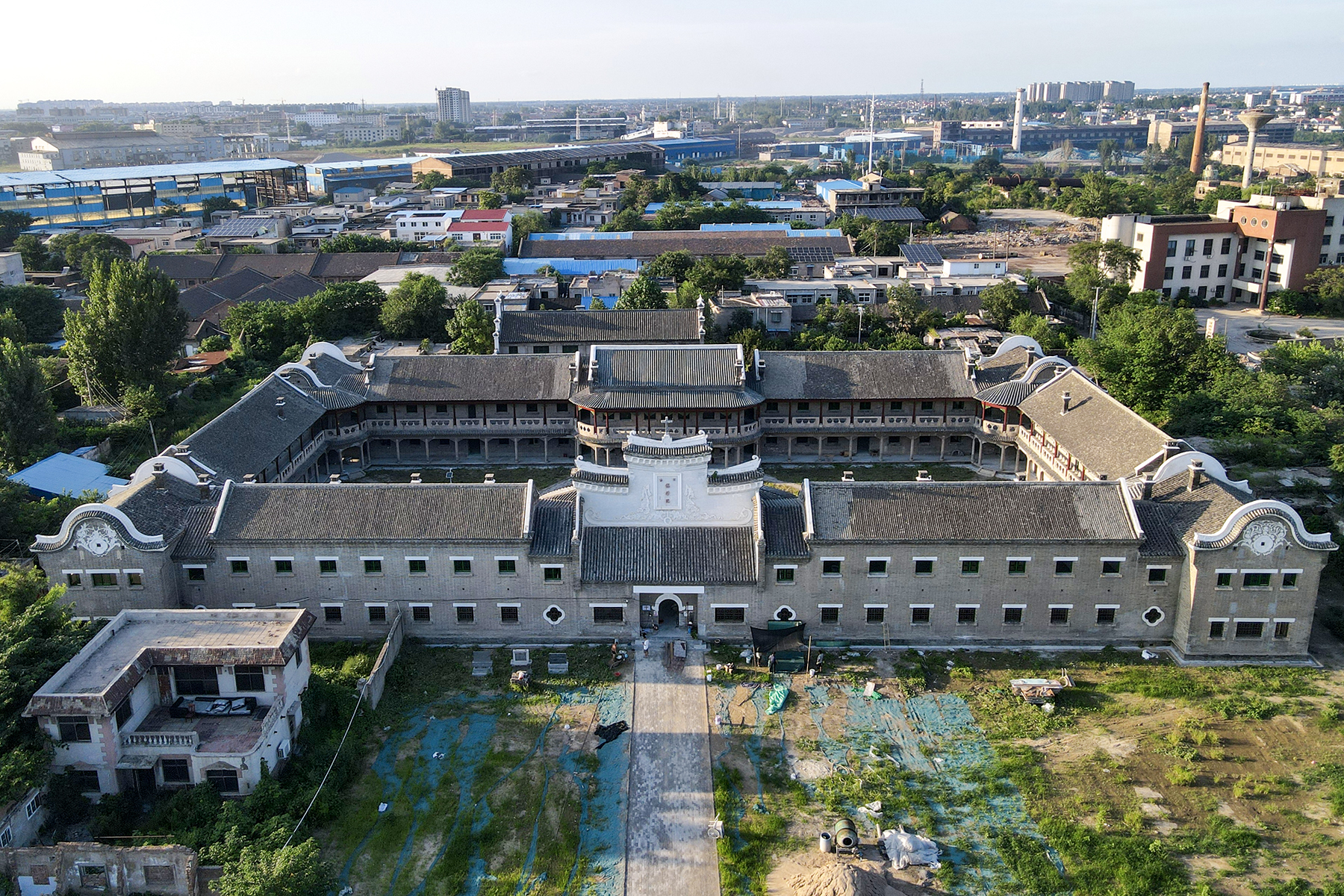
The Former Henan Catholic Convent, Kaifeng

== Economy ==
Henan is the 5th-largest provincial economy of China, the second largest in South Central China after Guangdong, the largest in Central China and the largest among inland provinces, with a nominal GDP of 5.88 trillion RMB (US$926 billion) as of 2021, ahead of the GDP of Turkey of 815 billion. If it was a country, it would be the 18th-largest economy by nominal GDP and the 17th most populous as of 2021.

The 2021 Henan floods inflicted an estimated US$12.7 billion of economic damage in Henan.

=== Agriculture ===
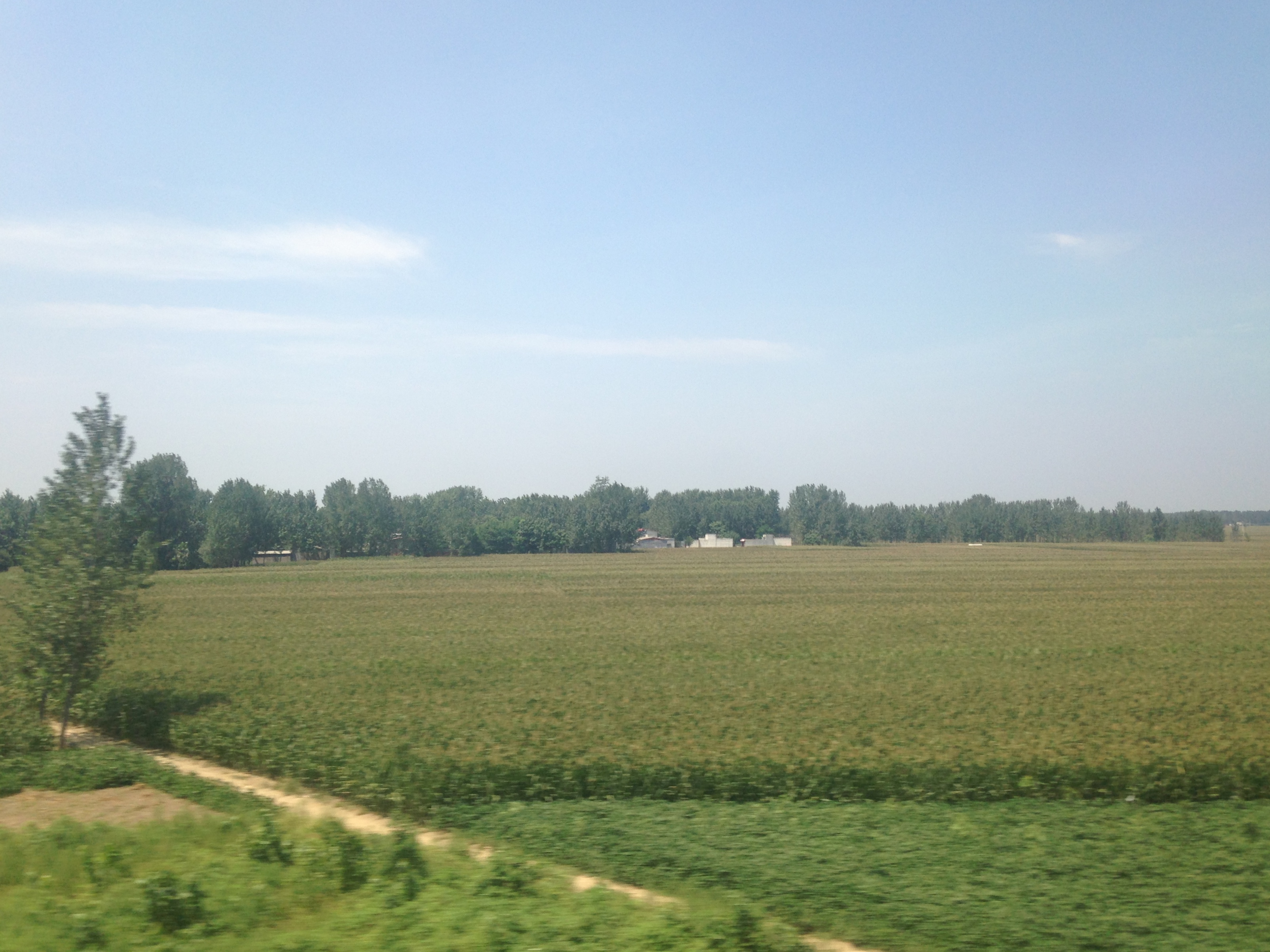
Farmland in Xiping County, Zhumadian

Henan is one of China's major agricultural provinces, with grain production as its primary characteristic. In 2025, the province's total grain output reached 135.097 billion jin (approximately 67.55 million metric tons), ranking second in the country and maintaining above 130 billion jin for nine consecutive years. The province produces roughly one-tenth of the nation's grain and over one-quarter of its wheat.

Beyond grain production, Henan has a substantial agricultural processing sector. The province is home to 6,103 industrial-scale agricultural processing enterprises, with the food industry representing a trillion-yuan sector. Products such as ham sausages, instant noodles, and quick-frozen tangyuan account for a significant share of the domestic market. In 2025, Henan's food exports reached 15.05 billion yuan, an increase of 12.4 percent year-on-year, with exports shipped to over 160 countries and regions.

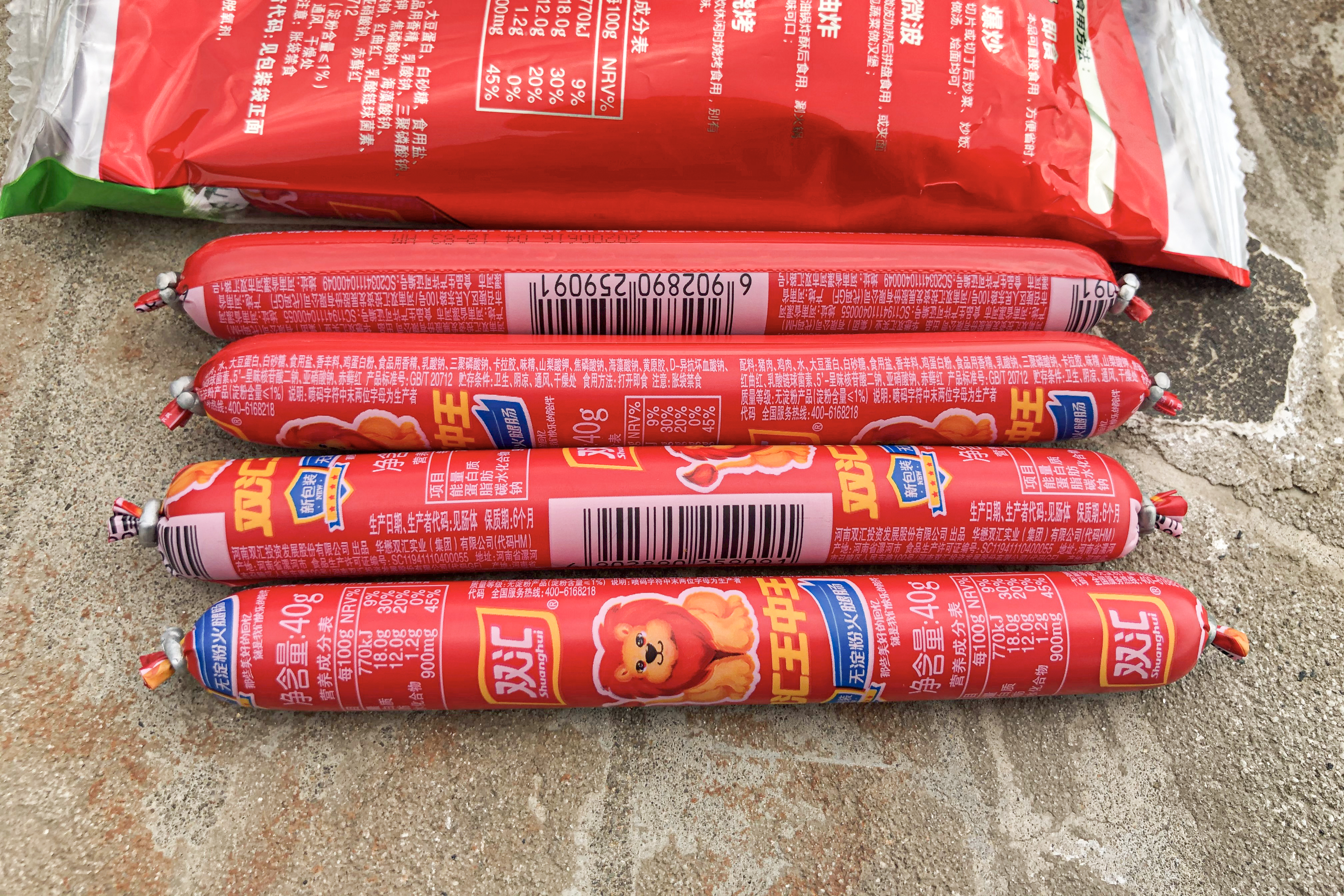
Shuanghui wheat flour sausage

In the livestock sector, Henan produced 7.534 million tons of pork, beef, mutton, and poultry meat in 2025, with 64.74 million pigs slaughtered. Vegetable and edible fungus production reached 85.03 million tons, with edible fungus output ranking first in the country for multiple consecutive years.

=== Industry ===
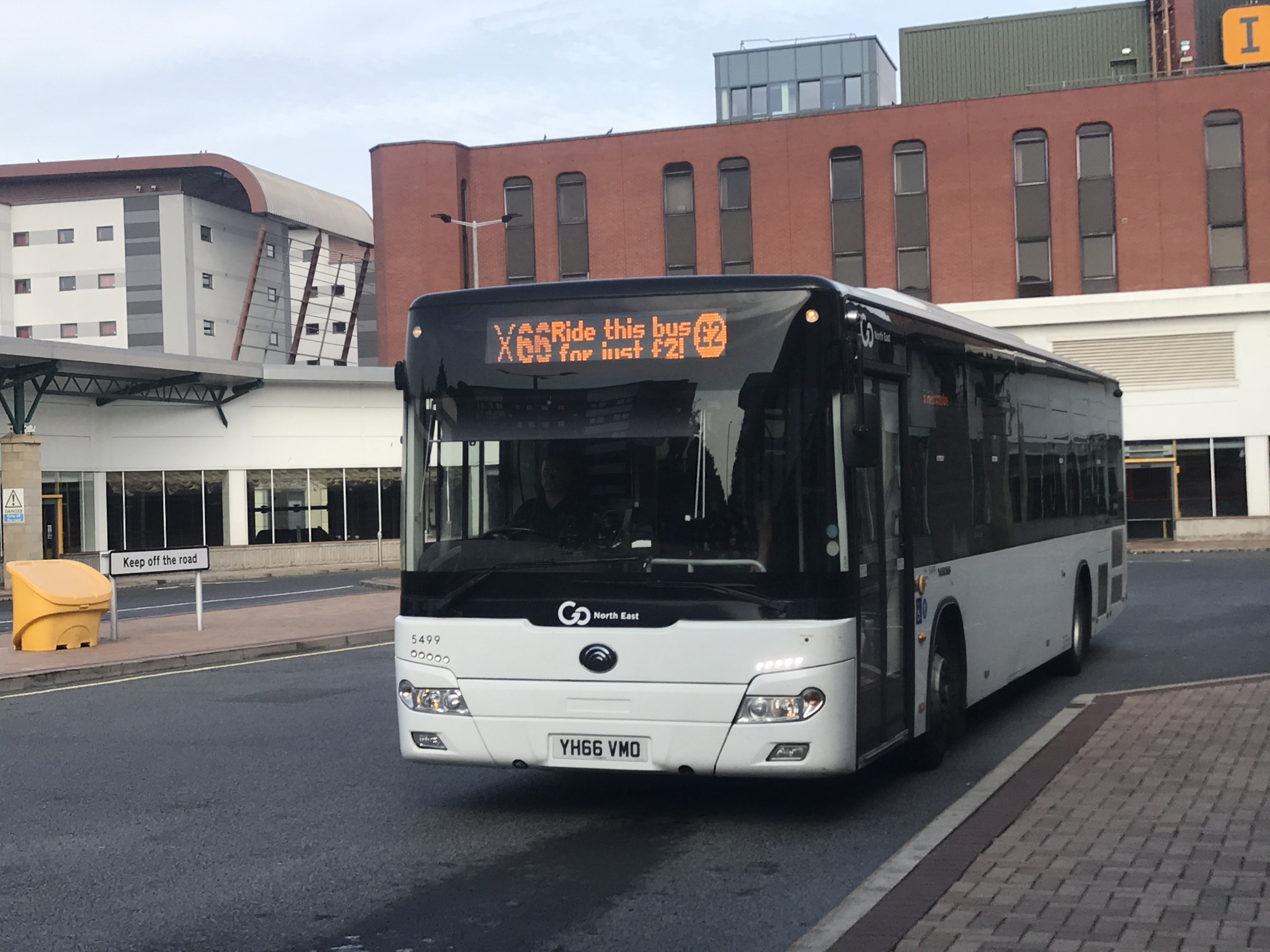
Yutong Bus

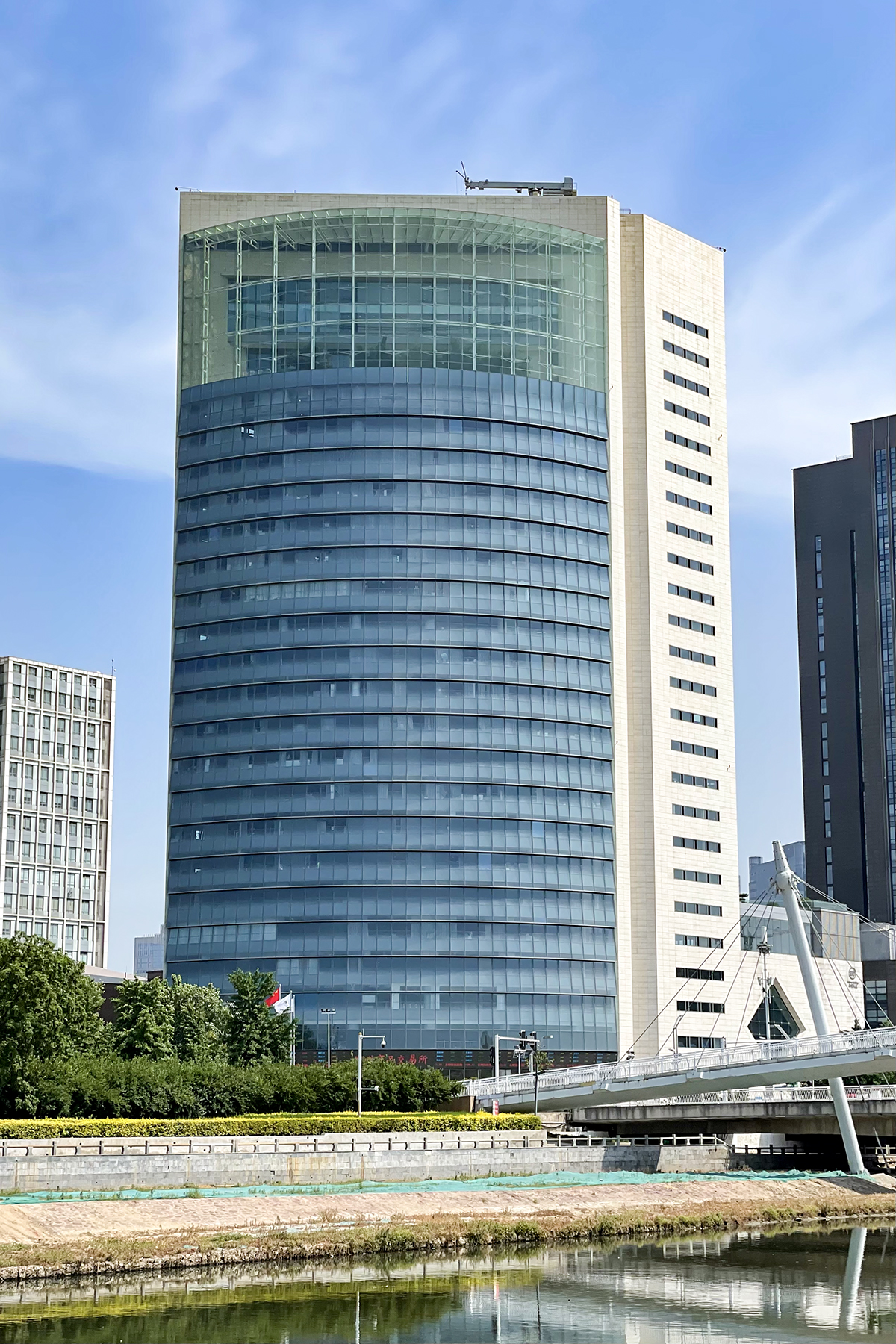
Zhengzhou Futures exchange

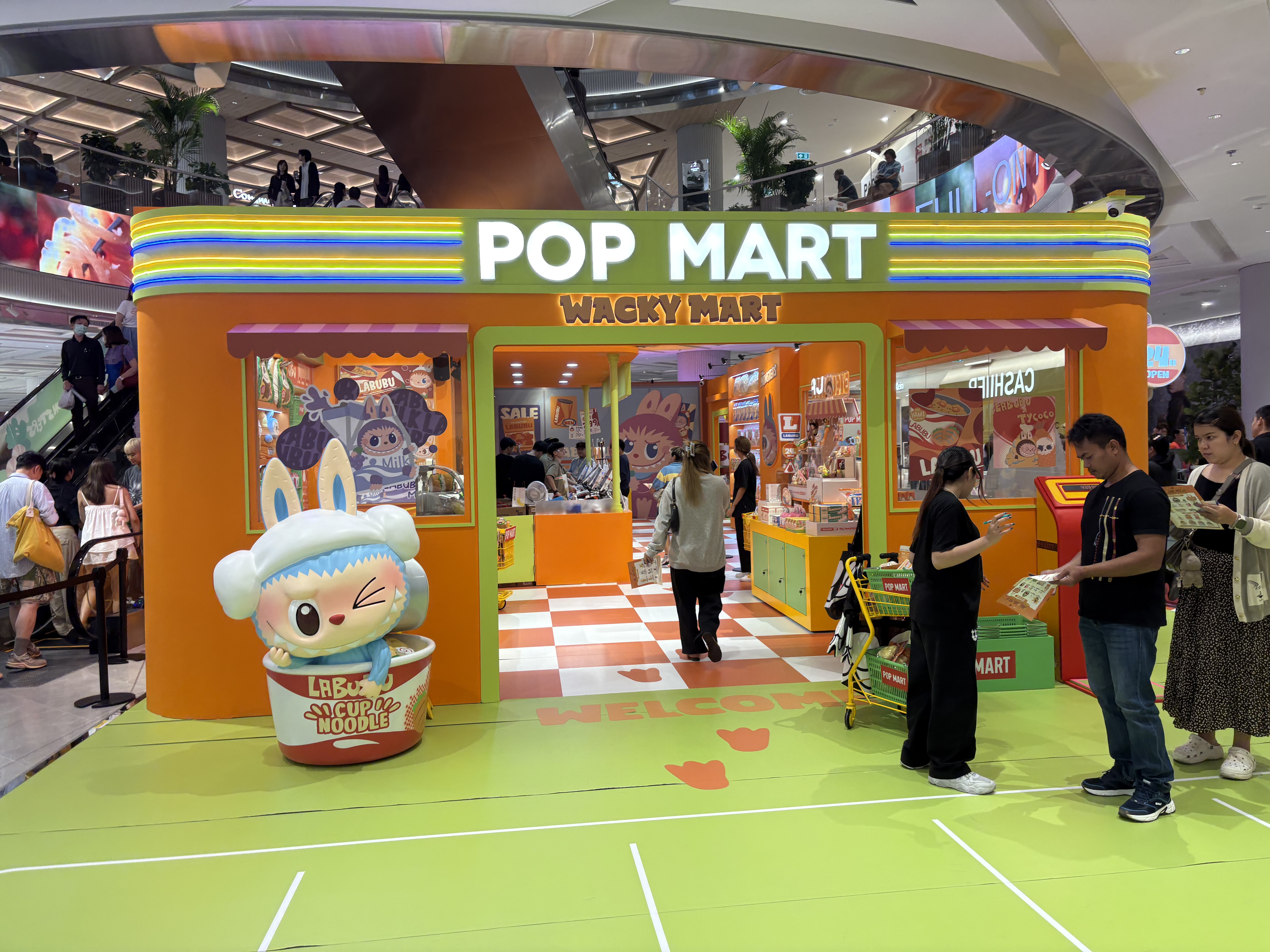
Pop Mart and Labubu

Henan is one of China's major industrial provinces and one of the few in the country that possesses all 41 industrial categories. In 2025, the province's large-scale industrial value-added output grew by 8.4 percent year on year, exceeding the national average by 2.5 percentage points. The five leading sectors—electronic information, equipment manufacturing, automobiles and parts, food processing, and new materials—made substantial contributions, with equipment manufacturing alone contributing 44.1 percent of the total industrial growth.

Mining-related industries are a part of Henan's economy. Henan has the second largest molybdenum reserves in the world. Coal, aluminum, alkaline metals and tungsten are present in larger amounts in western Henan. Henan houses limestone reserves estimated over 24 billion tons. Henan holds a dominant position in the global superhard materials industry, especially Zhecheng County. It produces approximately 80 percent of China's synthetic diamonds, accounting for the vast majority of the country's output and a significant share of the global market.

Henan has planned its economy around the provincial capital of Zhengzhou, and it is hoped that the province may become an important transportation and manufacturing hub in the years to come.

Xuchang, meanwhile, has become the world's largest wig manufacturing and distribution hub. It is home to over 4,000 wig-related enterprises and employs roughly 300,000 people, accounting for more than 60 percent of the global wig market. In 2025, Xuchang's wig industry recorded an import-export value of 21.91 billion yuan, with exports reaching 17.2 billion yuan.

New industries and high-tech manufacturing have gained considerable momentum, with value-added output rising by 13.0 percent and 16.6 percent respectively. Henan has become a significant player in new energy vehicles, hosting major manufacturers such as Yutong and BYD Zhengzhou. Annual vehicle production climbed from 66,000 units in 2021 to 681,000 in 2024, and exceeded 750,000 in 2025. In the first quarter of 2026, the province produced 195,200 new energy vehicles, ranking seventh nationwide. The province also ranks second nationwide in mobile phone production, and its domestic server brand, xFusion, holds the largest market share in China for locally manufactured servers. In 2025, the total operating revenue of Henan's large-scale industrial enterprises exceeded five trillion yuan.

=== Finance ===
Zhengzhou Commodity Exchange (郑州期货交易所), founded in October 1990, was the first Futures exchange approved by the State Council. In 2025, ZCE recorded a cumulative trading volume of 3.14 billion contracts and a trading value of 89.0 trillion yuan. By the end of 2023, the total assets of financial industry corporate entities in the province reached 14.21 trillion yuan.

=== Commerce ===
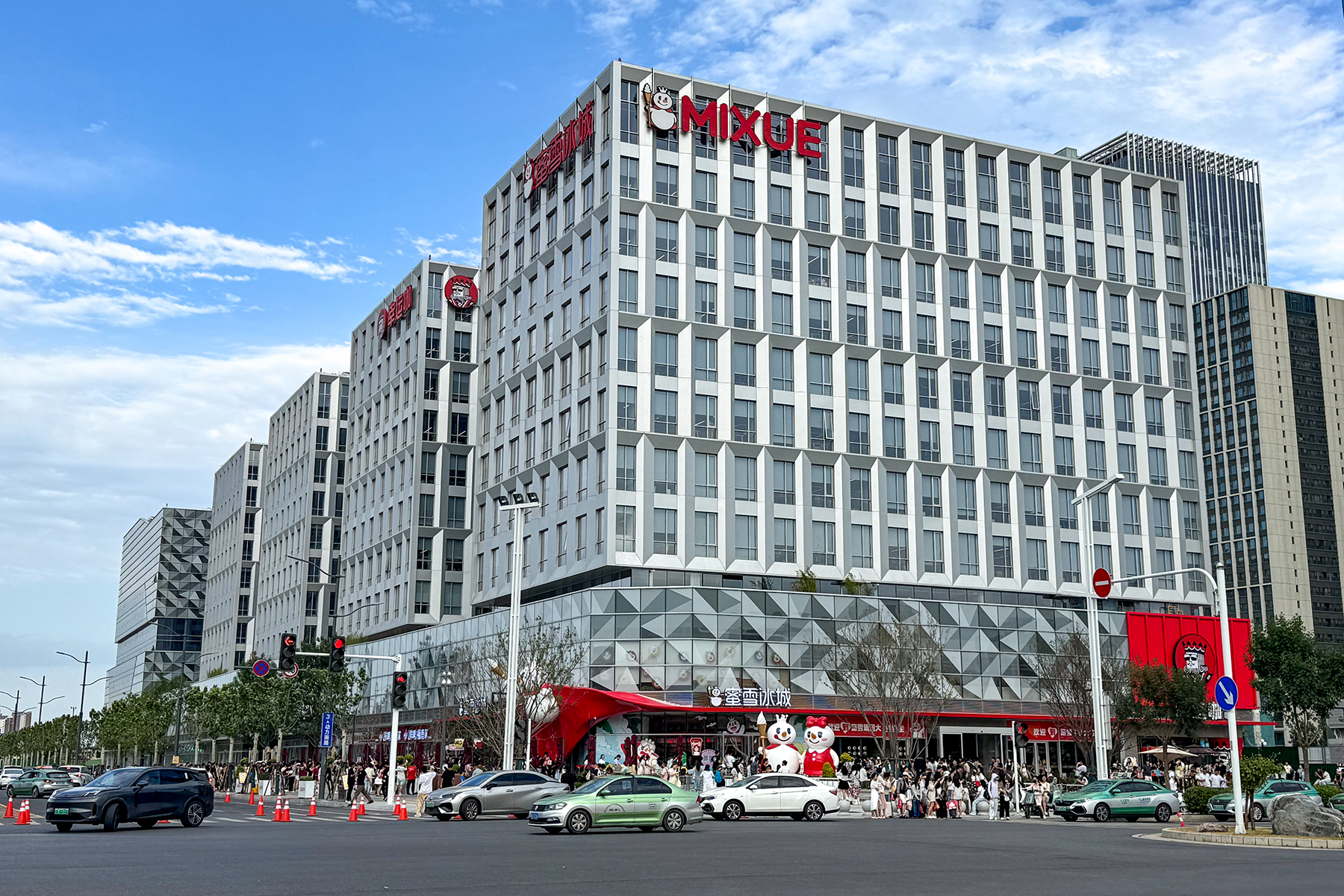
Mixue Bingcheng headquarter

With its huge hinterland population and consumer base, Zhengzhou has become an important commercial hub in central China. Pang Donglai, headquartered in Xuchang, has drawn widespread attention for its distinctive business model. The group currently carries no loans and holds 4.1 billion yuan in cash reserves, and has implemented a profit-sharing mechanism covering all employees.

Mixue Bingcheng, from the cold beverage sector, and Pop Mart, from the toy industry, are Henan-born brands that have achieved global reach in recent years.

=== Tourism ===
Classical cultural emphasis made Henan a popular destination, with the province receiving over 1.06 billion domestic visitors and generating 1.03 trillion yuan in tourism revenue in 2024. In recent years, the province has also witnessed rapid growth in inbound tourism, with international arrivals rising 60.5% year-on-year in 2025, supported by the 240-hour visa-free transit policy and digital payment upgrades that now accommodate overseas bank cards and e-wallets from 32 countries.

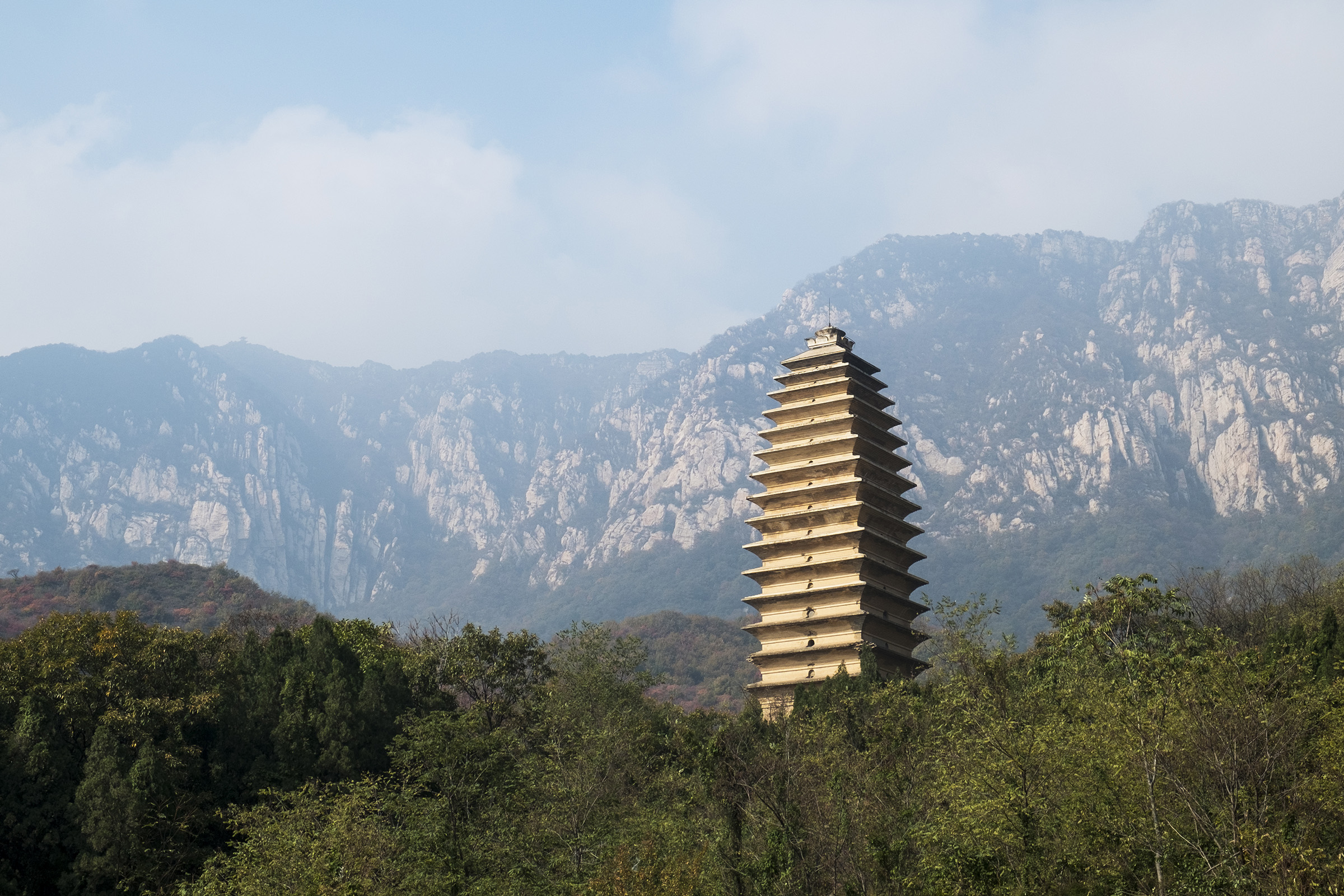
Fawang Temple pagoda in Mount Song

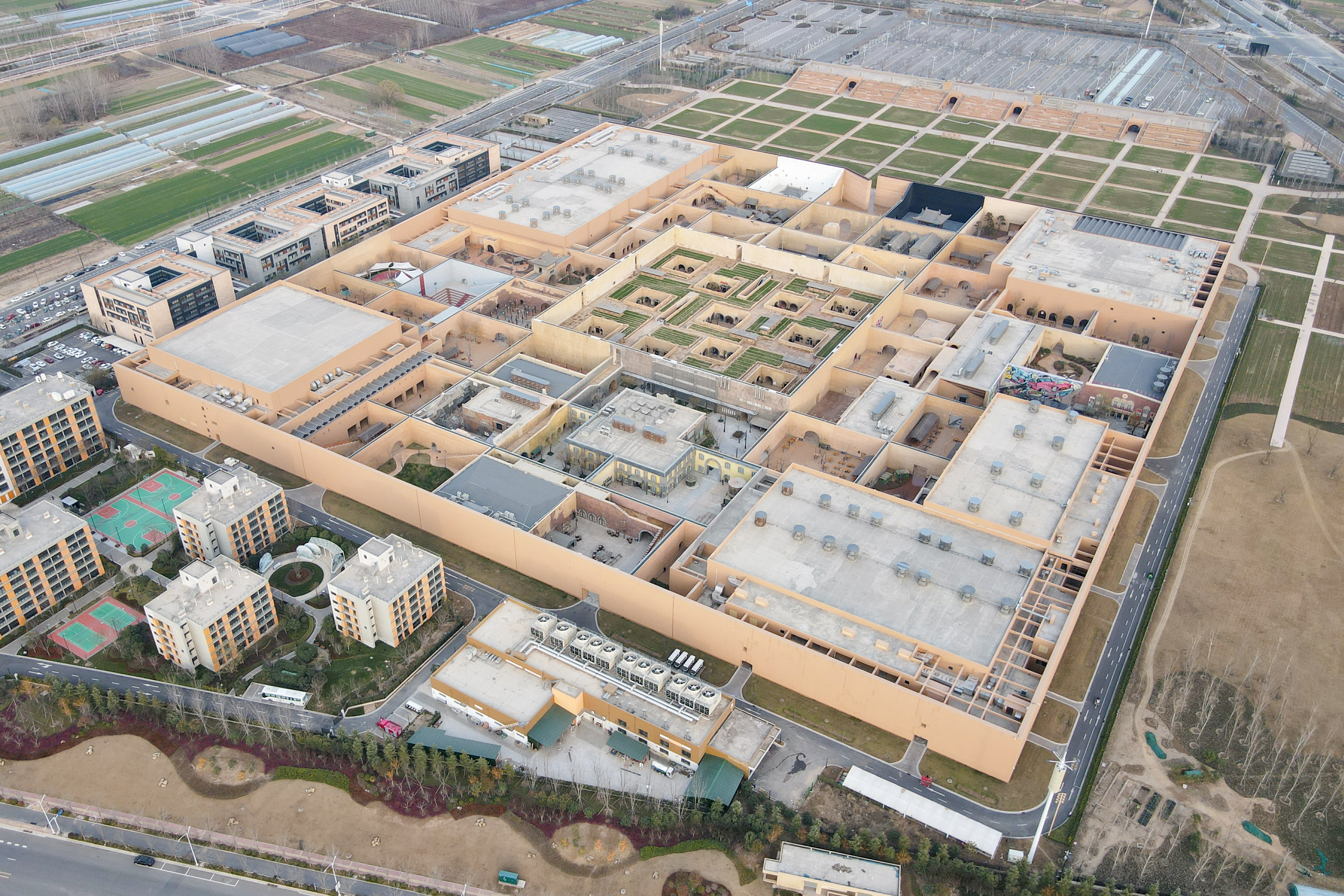
Unique Henan: Land of Dramas theme park

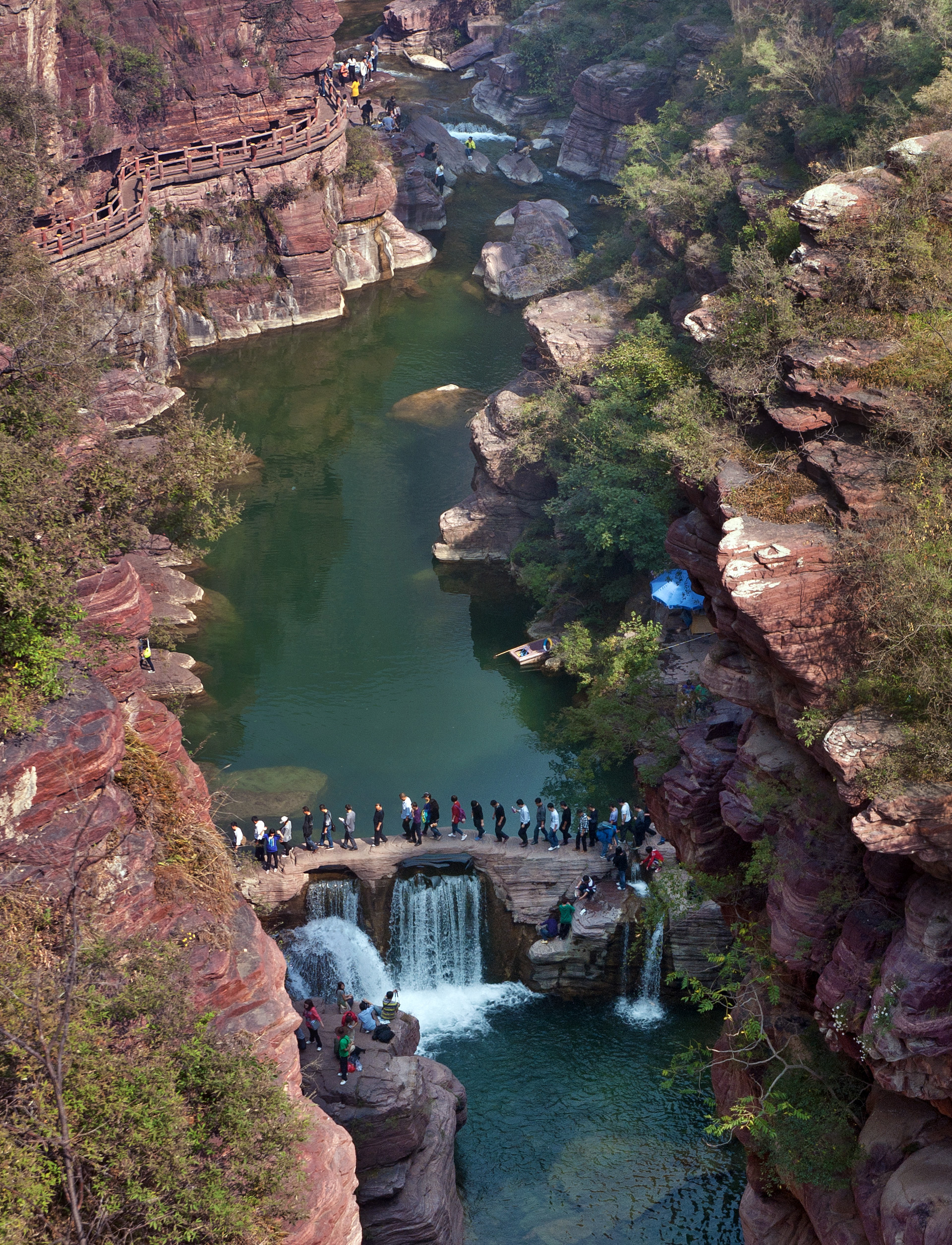
Hongshi valley, Yuntai Mountain

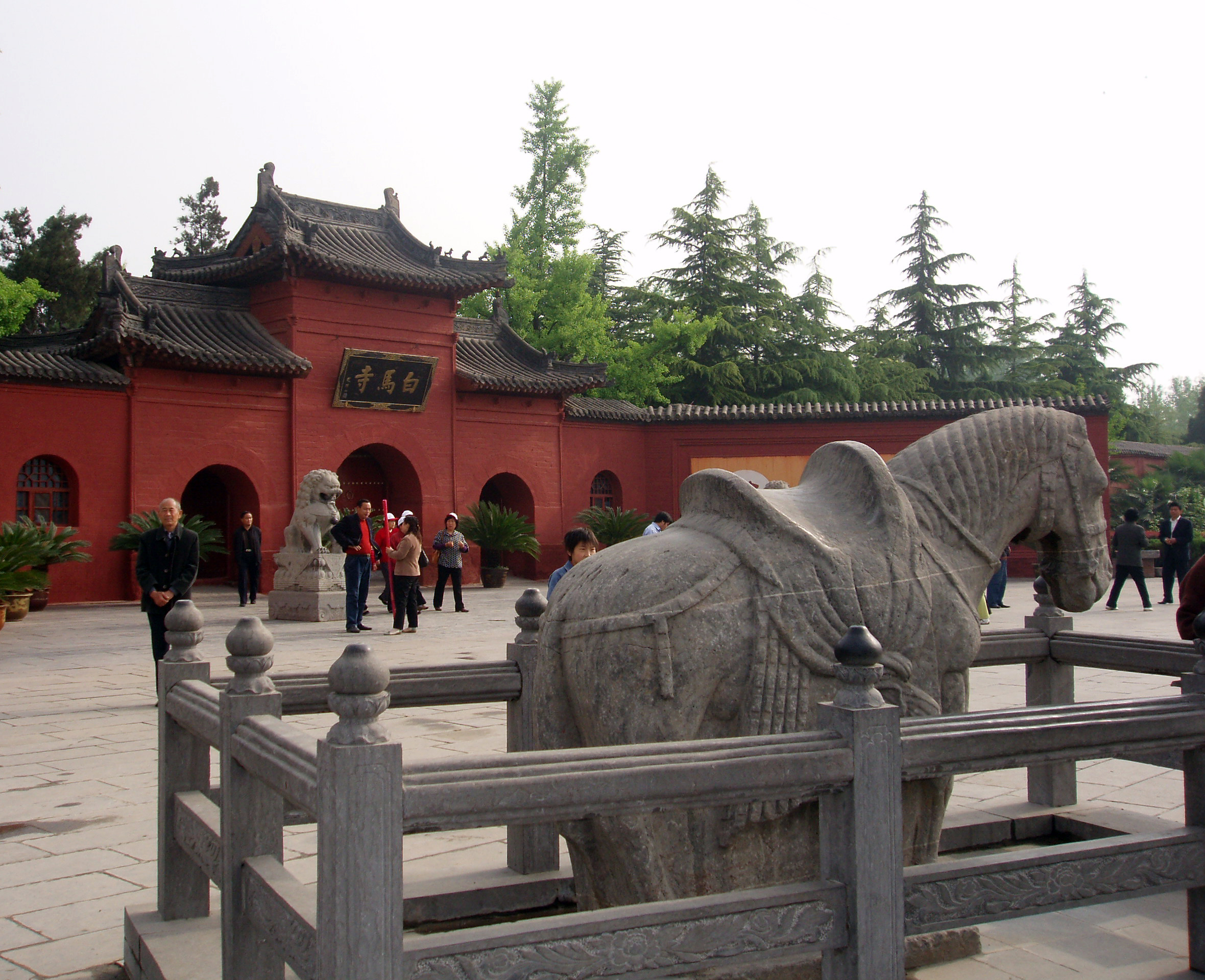
White Horse Temple, first empire-founded Buddhist temple in China

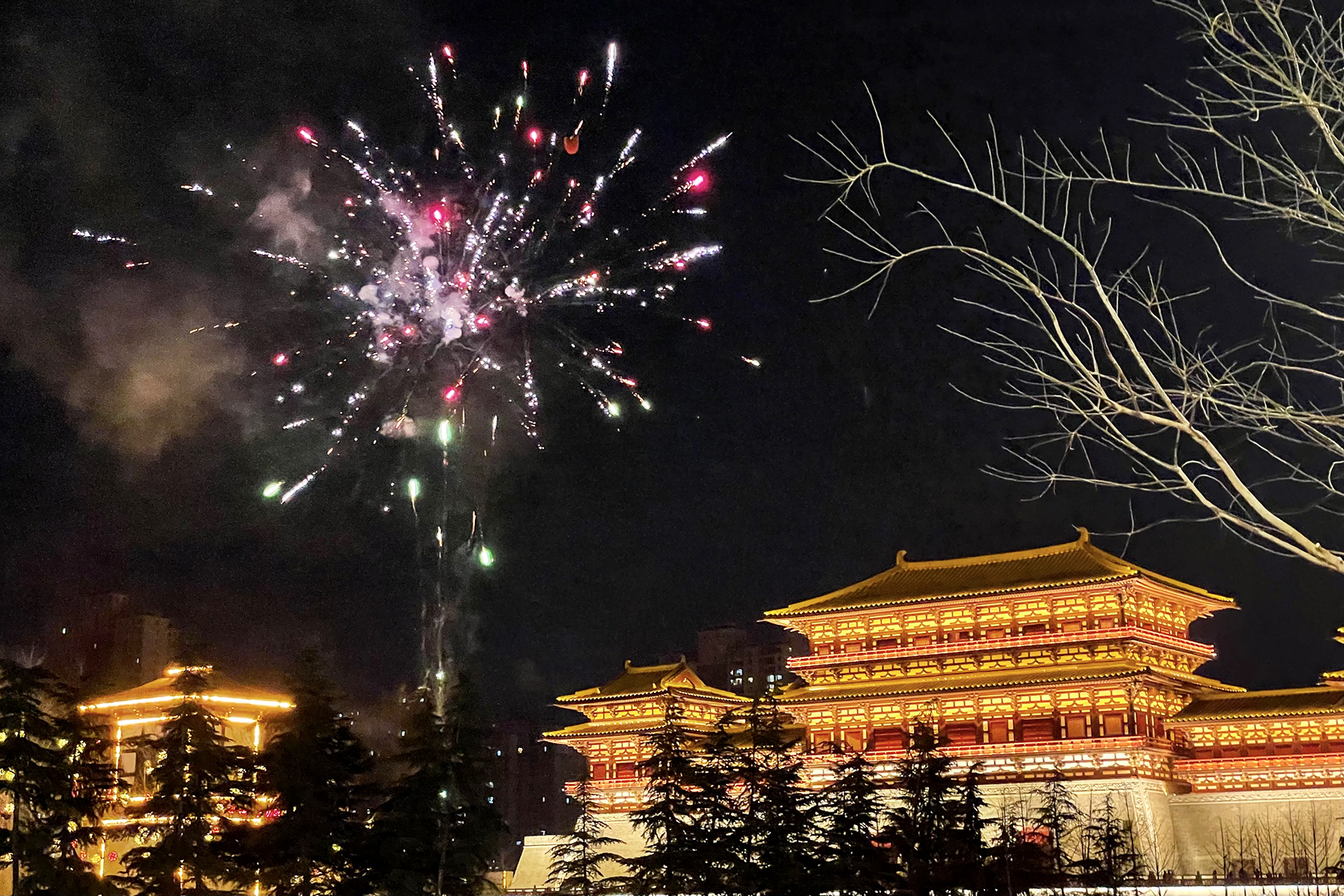
Yingtian Gate, Luoyang

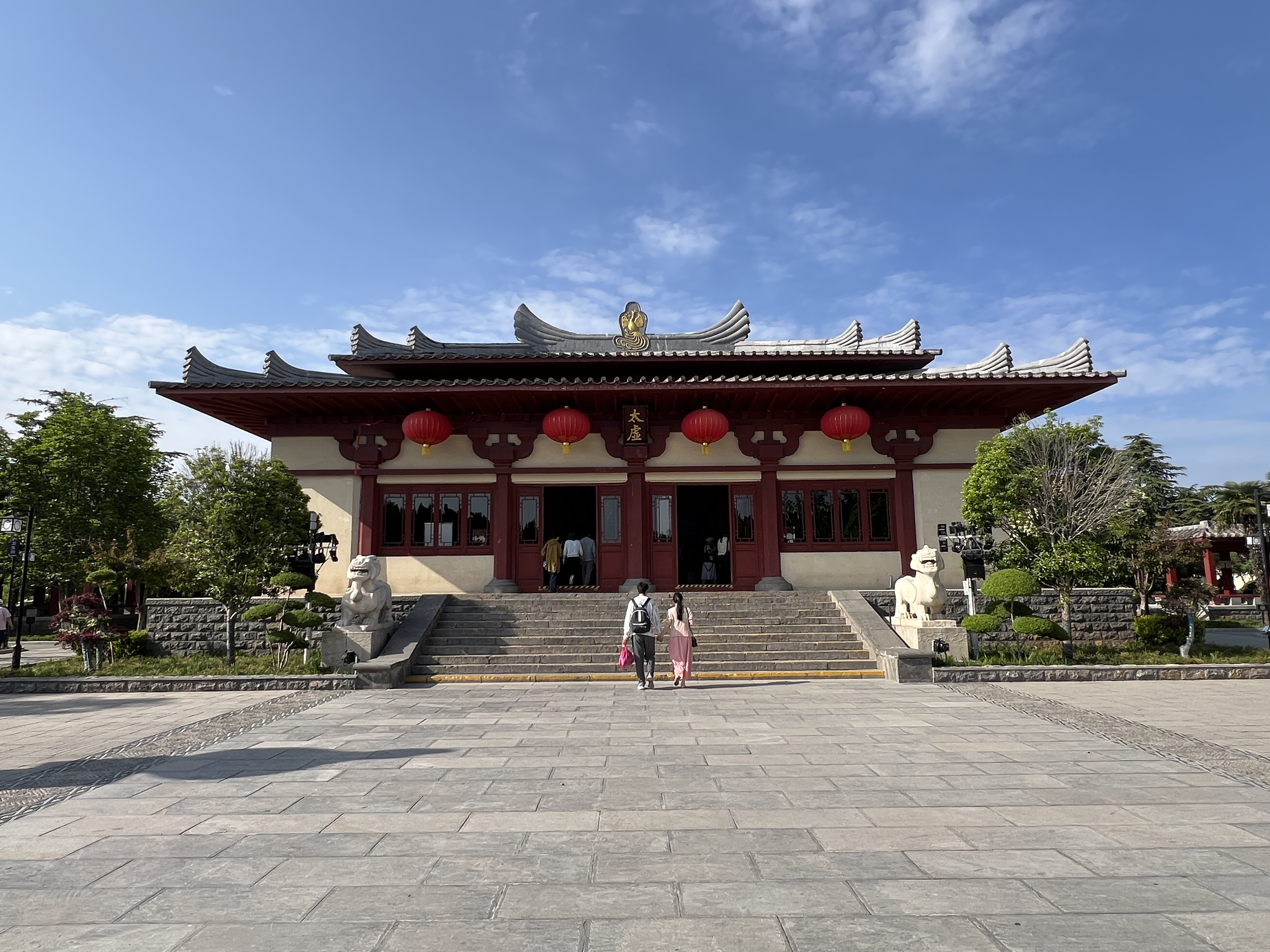
Luoyang Ancient Tombs Museum

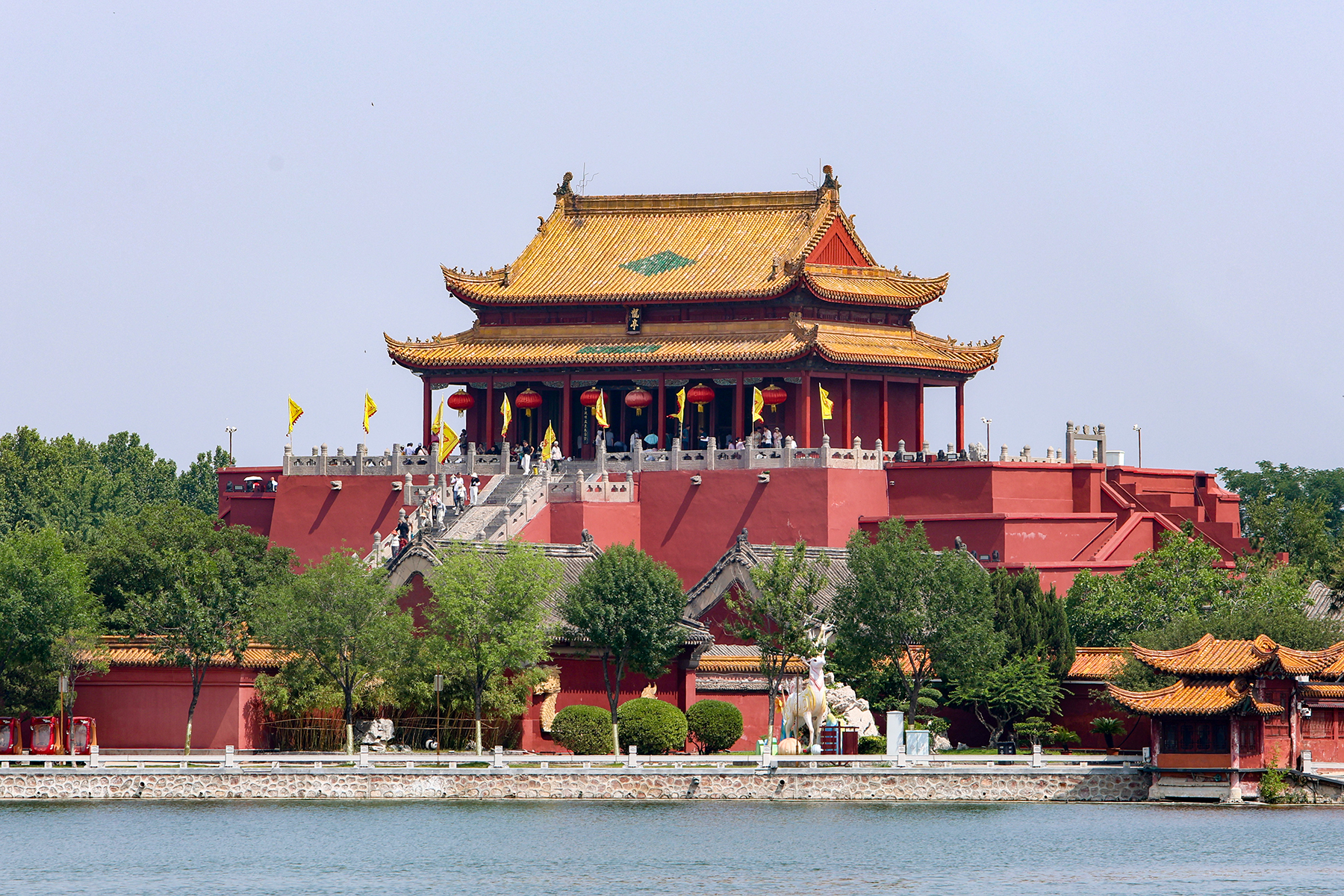
Longting, Kaifeng

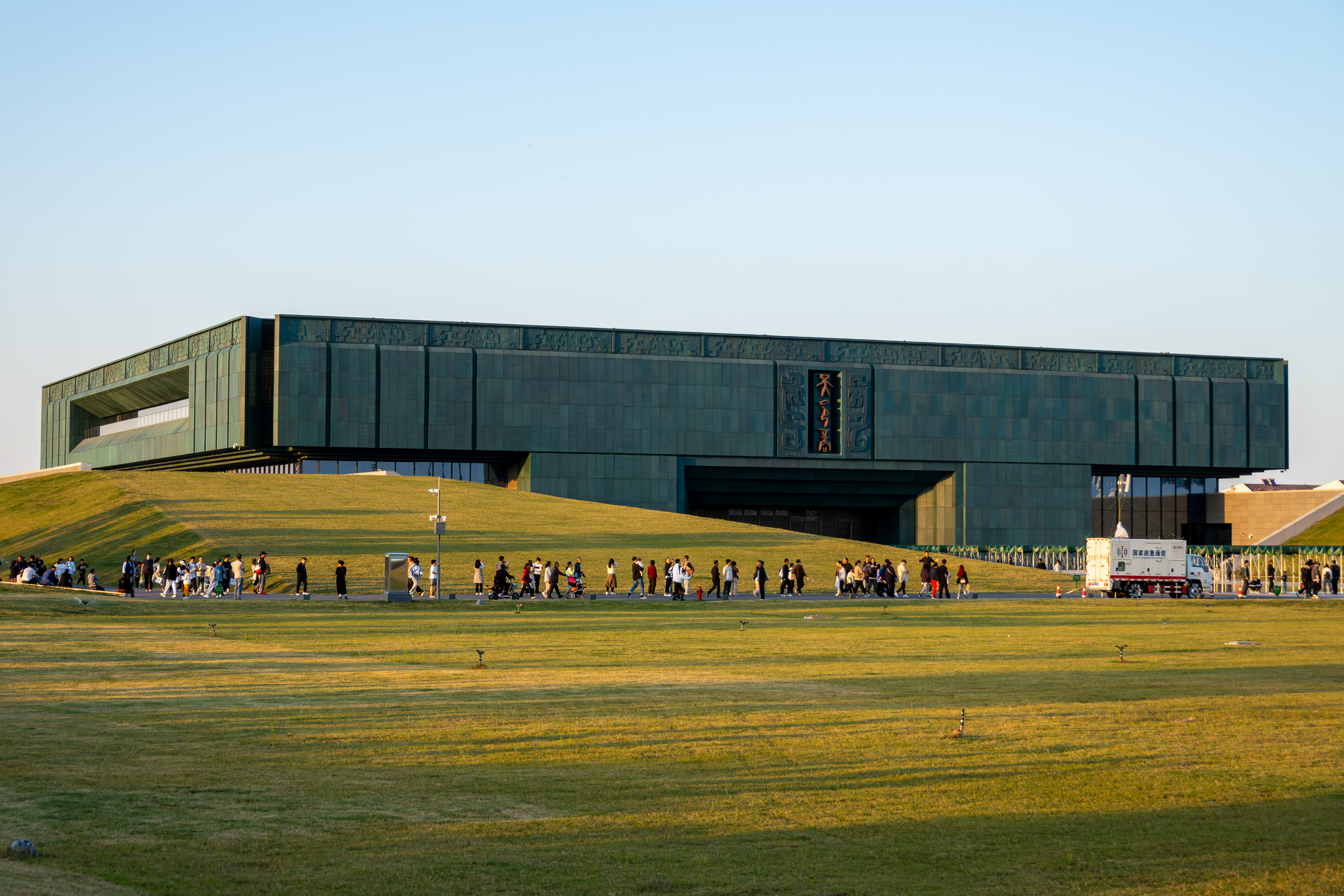
Yinxu Museum

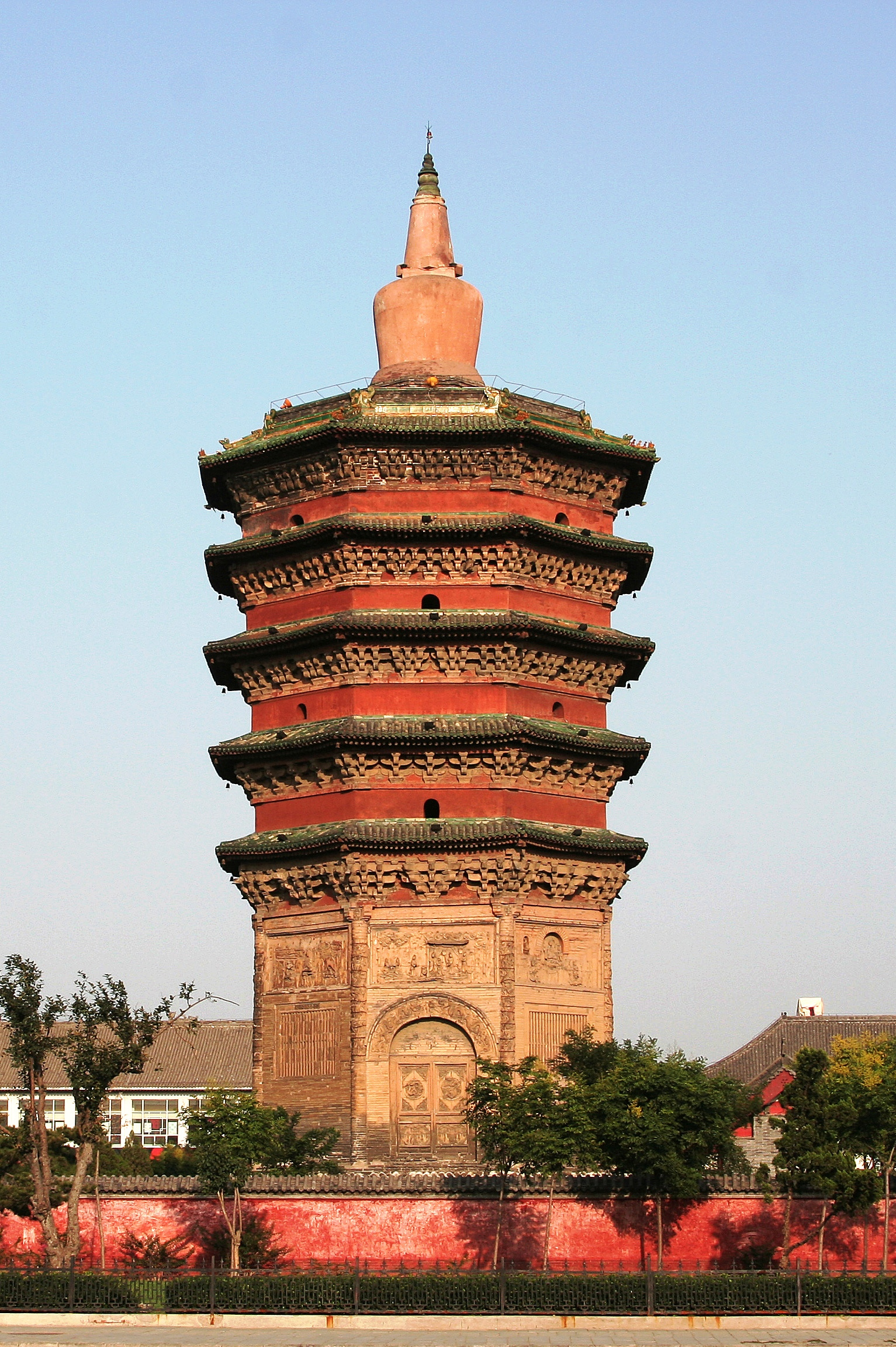
Wenfeng Pagoda in Anyang

== Transportation ==
Henan serves as a central transportation hub in China. By the end of 2025, the province had built an integrated transport network of over 292,000 kilometers. The Jingguang and Longhai Railways run through the province and intersect at Zhengzhou. Other railway hubs such as Shangqiu, Xinxiang, and Luohe have also become centers of trade and manufacturing as a result.

=== Railway ===
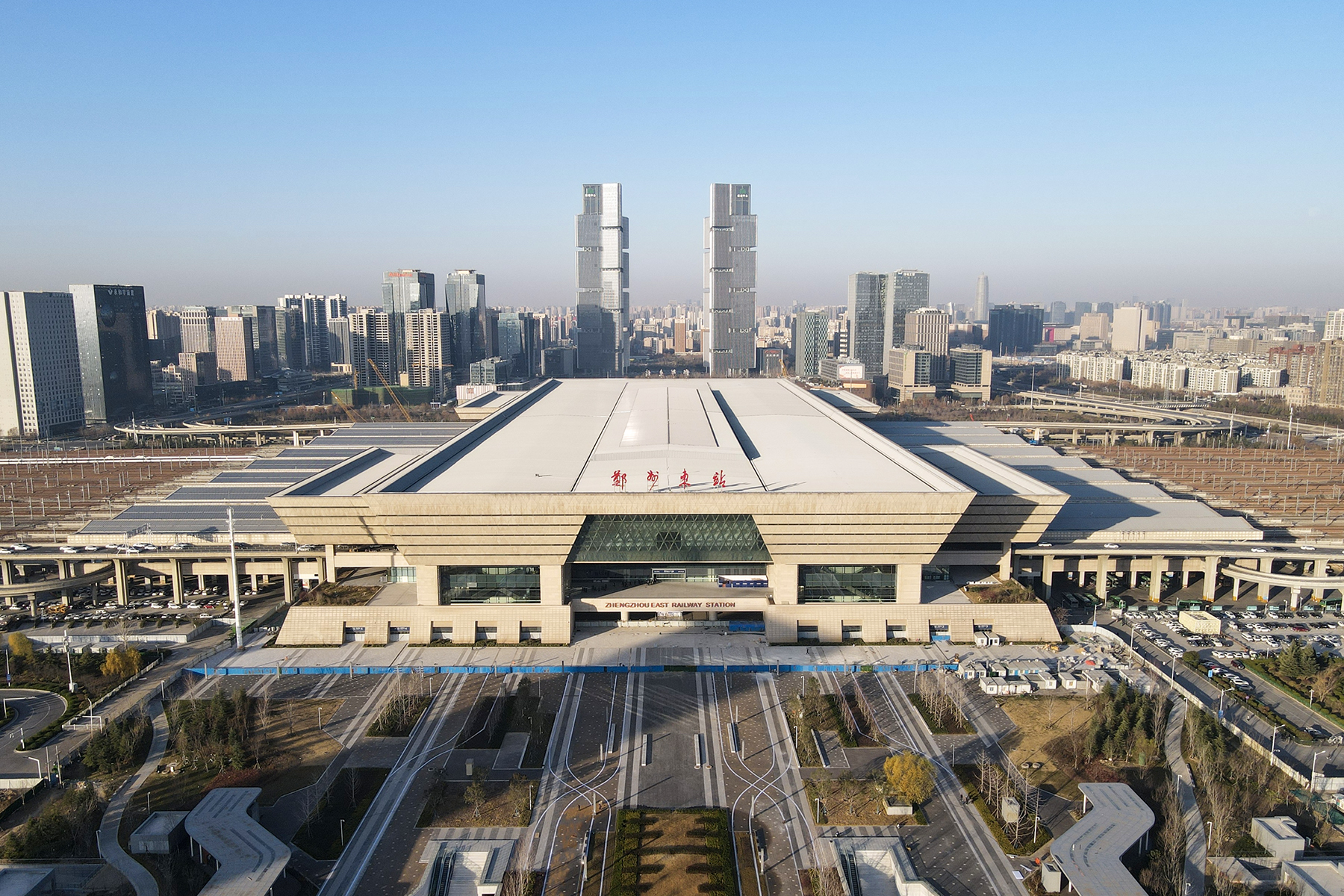
Zhengzhoudong railway station

The province operates a "米"-shaped (eight-direction) high-speed rail network centered on Zhengzhou. By 2025, Henan's total railway operations reached 6,810 kilometers, including 2,263 kilometers of high-speed rail, covering all prefecture-level cities.

=== Highway ===
Expressway mileage exceeded 8,962 kilometers by late 2025, with the total expected to surpass 10,000 kilometers. Over 80% of counties have access to at least two expressways.

=== Aviation ===
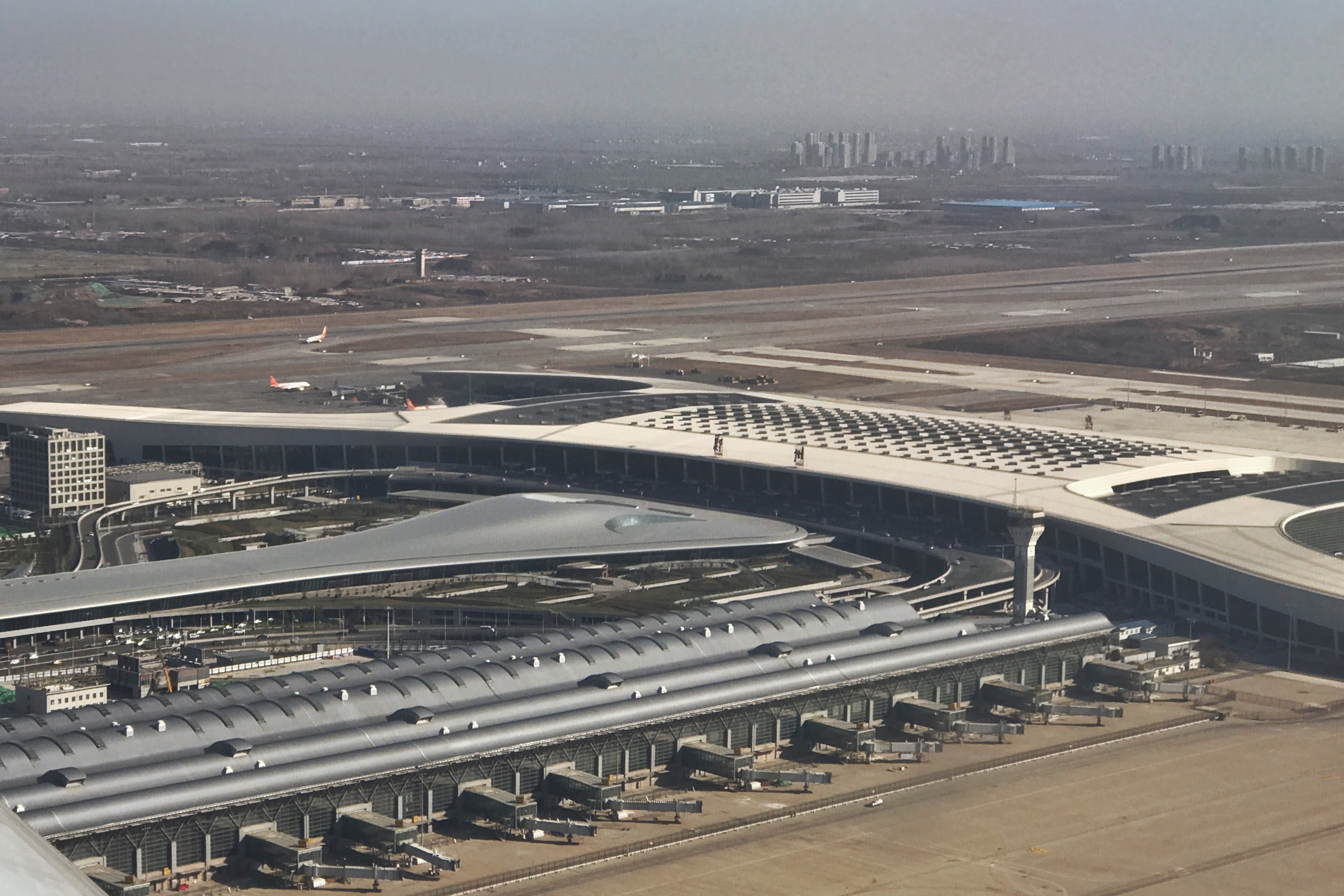
Zhengzhou-xinzheng Airport

Zhengzhou-xinzheng Airport handles 62 all-cargo routes connecting more than 30 countries. Other civil airports include Luoyang Beijiao, Nanyang Jiangying, Xinyang Minggang, and Anyang Hongqiqu.

=== Waterways ===
Henan has two major inland waterways along the Huaihe and Shaying rivers, with a total navigable length of 1,825 kilometers. Ports such as Zhoukou are classified as inland ports.

== Culture ==
=== Mythology ===
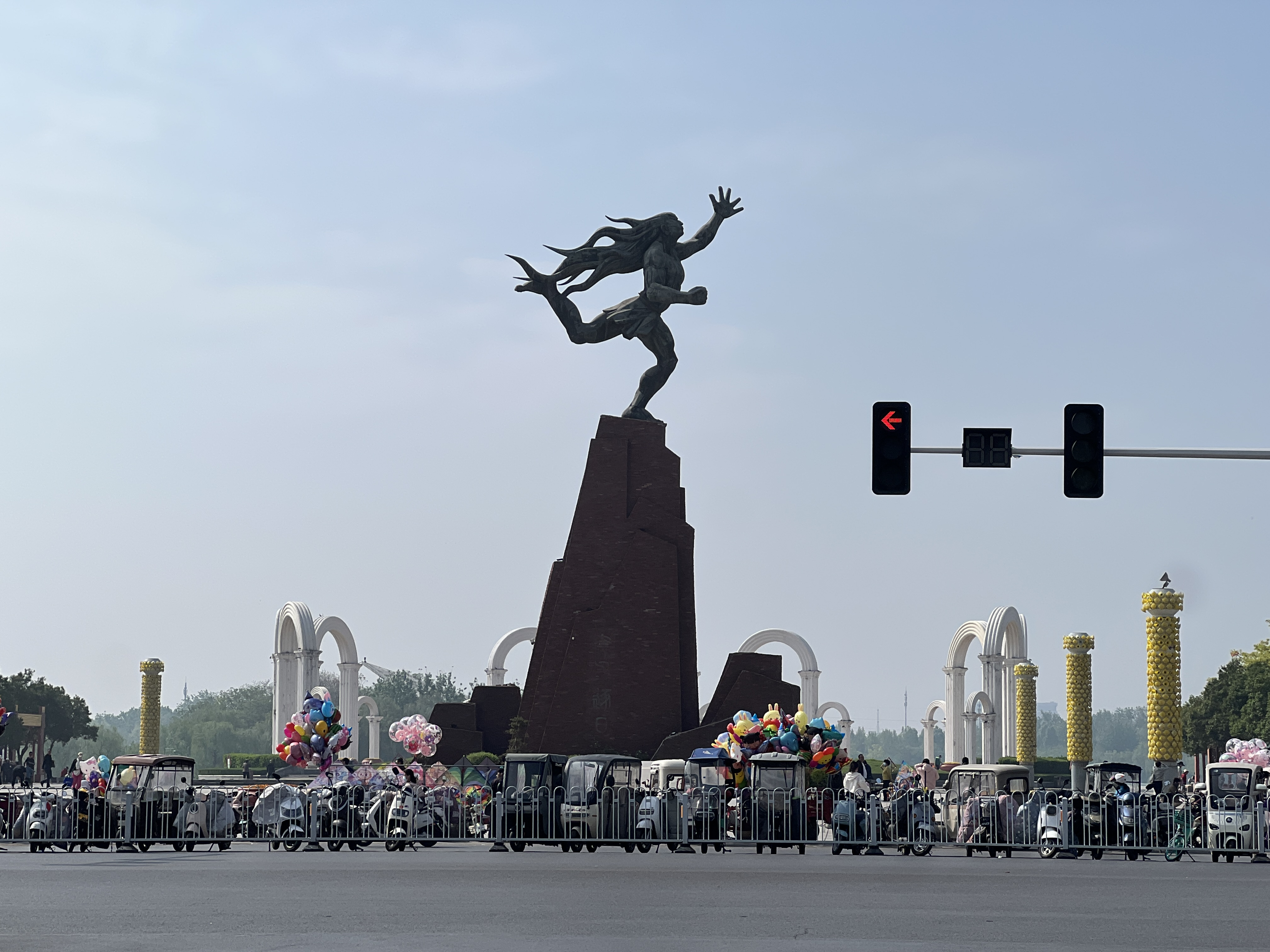
Statue Kuafu Chasing the Sun in Jiaozuo

Henan is the heartland of Chinese mythology. The goddess Nüwa (女娲), famous for repairing the heavens and creating humanity from clay, is celebrated in Jiyuan, which was named a "Home of Chinese Nüwa Mythology" in 2006. Fuxi (伏羲), the first of the Three Sovereigns, is said to have established his capital in Chen (present-day Huaiyang) and created the Eight Trigrams. Suiren (燧人), the legendary firemaker by drilling wood, is said to have lived in the area of Shangqiu, and is often listed as the first of the "Three Augusts". Shennong (神农), also known as the Yan Emperor, is credited with teaching agriculture and herbal medicine and is associated with the region of Huaiyang. According to legend, the Yellow Emperor (Huangdi) was born in Xinzheng and defeated both the Yan Emperor and Chi You (蚩尤) in major battles that led to the unification of the Central Plains. Yu the Great (大禹), famed for taming the great flood by dredging rivers rather than building dams, is said to have been active in Yuzhou, which is named for him and is home to many related sites and legends. The myth of Kua Fu (夸父), who chased the sun until he died of thirst, is said to have taken place in the mountainous regions of western Henan, such as Lingbao. The fable of Yu Gong (愚公), the old man who tried to move Mount Wangwu (王屋山) and Taihang Mountains (太行山), which are located in Jiyuan.

=== Language ===
Zhongyuan Mandarin spoken across most of the province. However, the province is not linguistically uniform: in the northern-west areas along the Yellow River, dialects belonging to Jin are spoken.

=== Literature ===
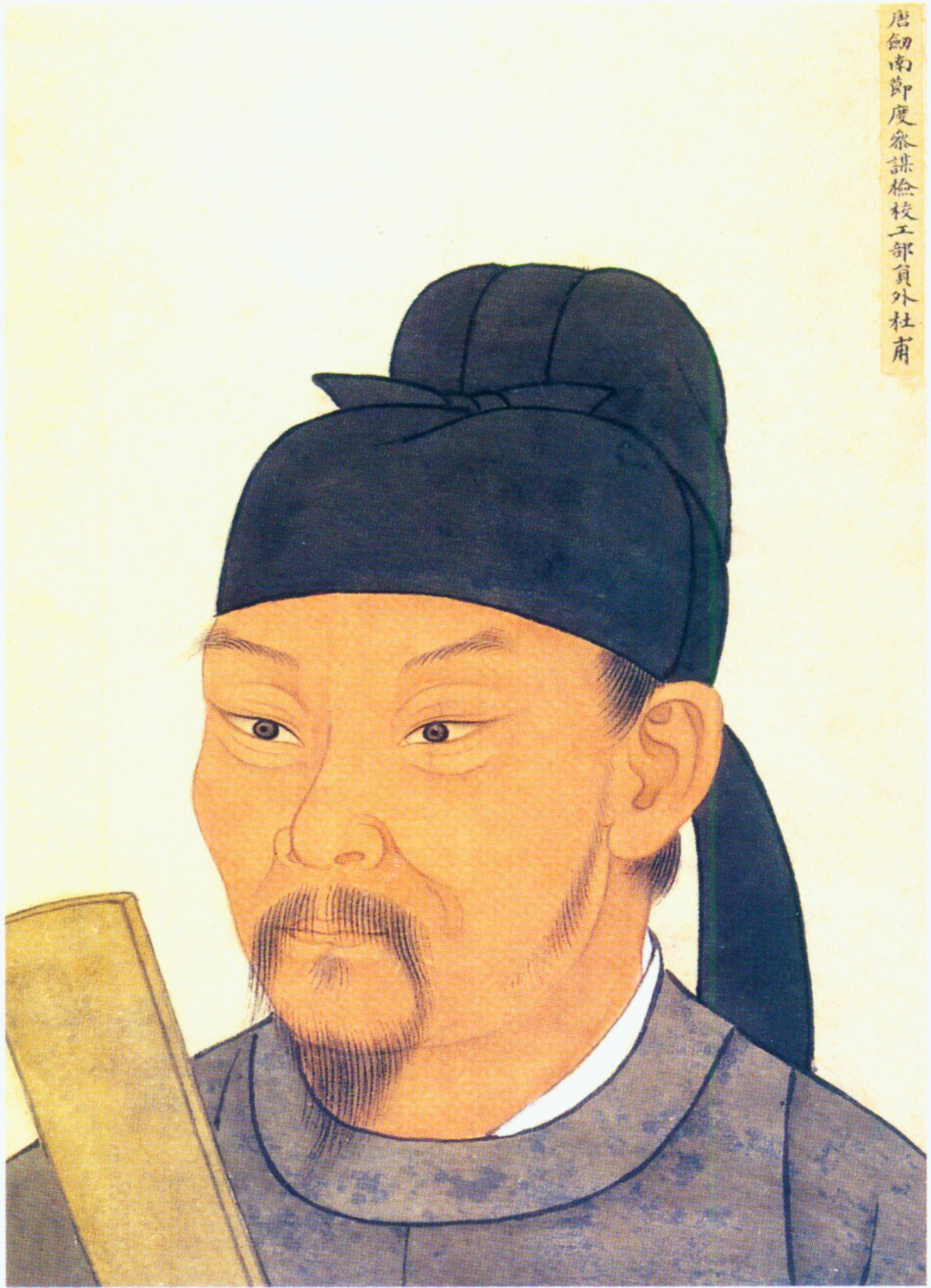
Du Fu, "the Sage of Poetry"

Henan literature roots trace back to the Classic of Poetry and texts of ancient masters. During the Han and Wei dynasties, Luoyang emerged as a literary center, giving rise to the "Jian'an" and "Zhengshi" styles that deeply influenced later literature. In the Tang and Song eras, major figures like Du Fu, Han Yu, and Bai Juyi brought Central Plains literature to its peak. In modern times, Henan literature has maintained a focus on rural life and social reality, developing a distinctive style characterized by its weighty, unadorned tone and its direct confrontation of human struggles. Today, it continues to produce influential novels, poetry, remaining an important current within contemporary Chinese literature. Henan has also produced Liu Cixin, one of China's most celebrated science fiction writers.

=== Sports ===
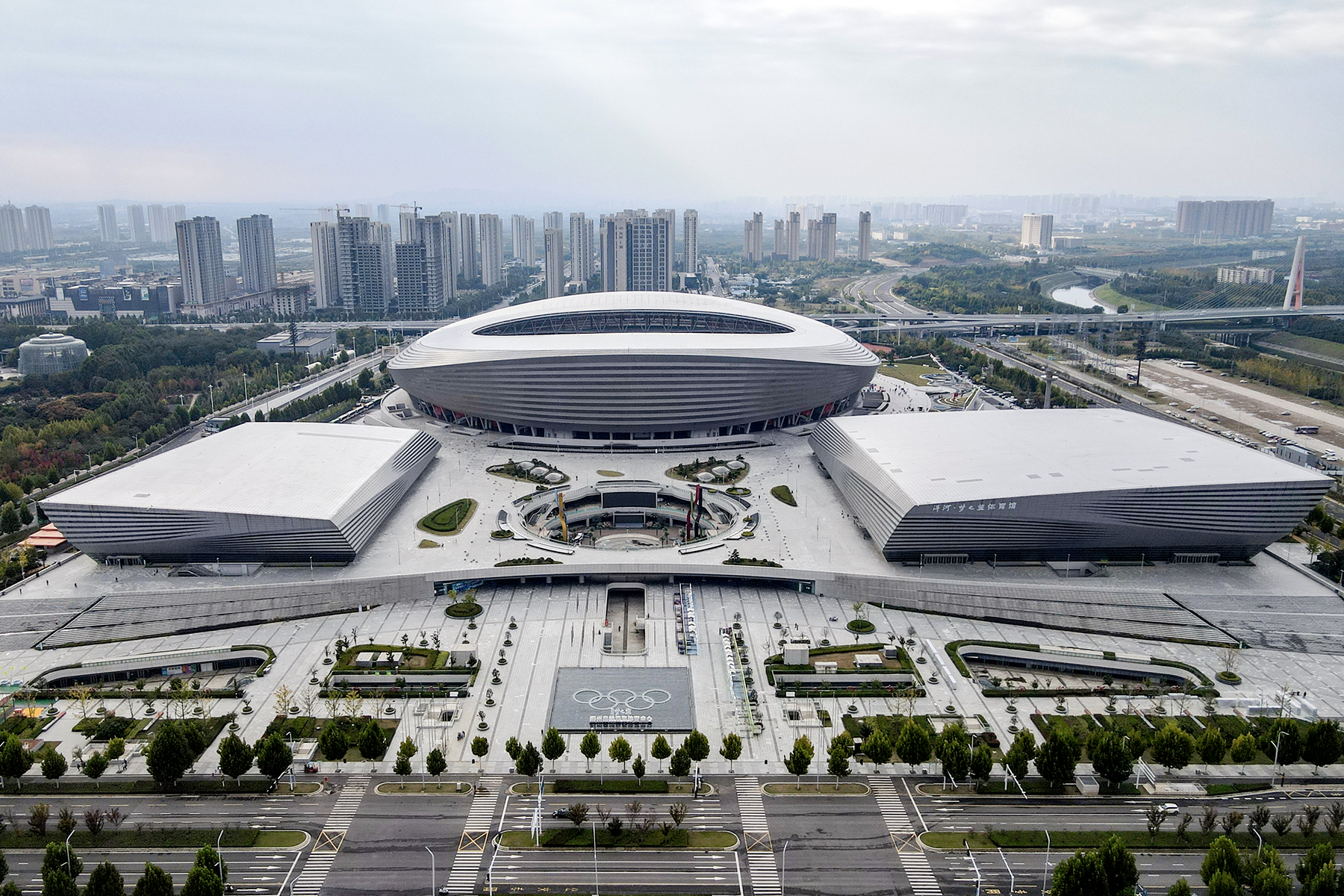
Zhengzhou Olympic Sports Centre Stadium

Henan is the birthplace of Shaolin kung fu and Chen-style taijiquan. Zhengzhou also serves as the production base for Wu Lin Feng, a globally broadcast kickboxing promotion. In the modern arena, Zhengzhou has hosted the F1H2O World Championship for multiple years, along with the ITTF Finals and a WTA tennis tournament, while Luoyang held the UCI Junior Track Cycling World Championships in 2024.

==== Sport clubs ====
Professional sports teams based in Henan include:

- Henan F.C.

=== Education ===
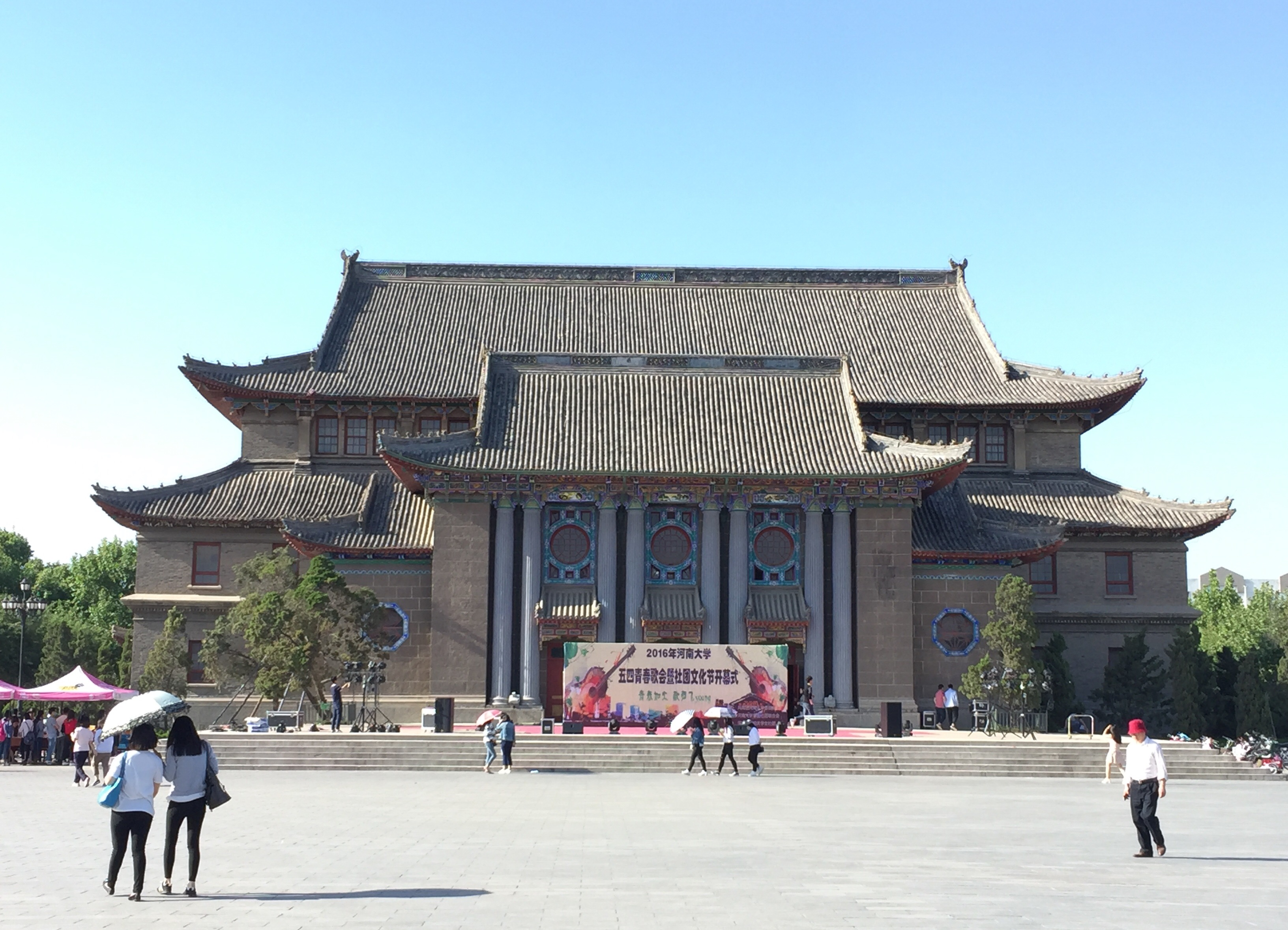
Henan University, Kaifeng

Henan hosts more than 160 higher education institutions. Along with Jiangsu and Zhejiang, Henan is one of the three Chinese provinces with at least three cities that are among the top 140 in the world by scientific research output. Major universities in Henan include Zhengzhou University, Henan University, Henan Normal University, Henan University of Science and Technology, Henan Polytechnic University, and Henan Agricultural University.

As of 2025, three cities in the province ranked in the top 140 cities in the world by scientific research output (Zhengzhou 58th, Kaifeng 136th and Xinxiang 138th) as tracked by the Nature Index.

== International relations ==
Henan is twinned with:

- Kansas, United States (since 1981)
- Mie Prefecture, Japan (since 1986)
- Saône-et-Loire, France (since 1990)
- Manitoba, Canada (since 1994)
- Samara Oblast, Russia (since 1997)
- Tyrol, Austria (established before 2001)
- North West, South Africa (since 2008)
- Lublin Voivodeship, Poland (since 2008)
- Balochistan, Pakistan (since 2023)
- Limpopo, South Africa
- Malacca, Malaysia
