= Yuanyang County, Henan =

Yuanyang 原阳县
- County
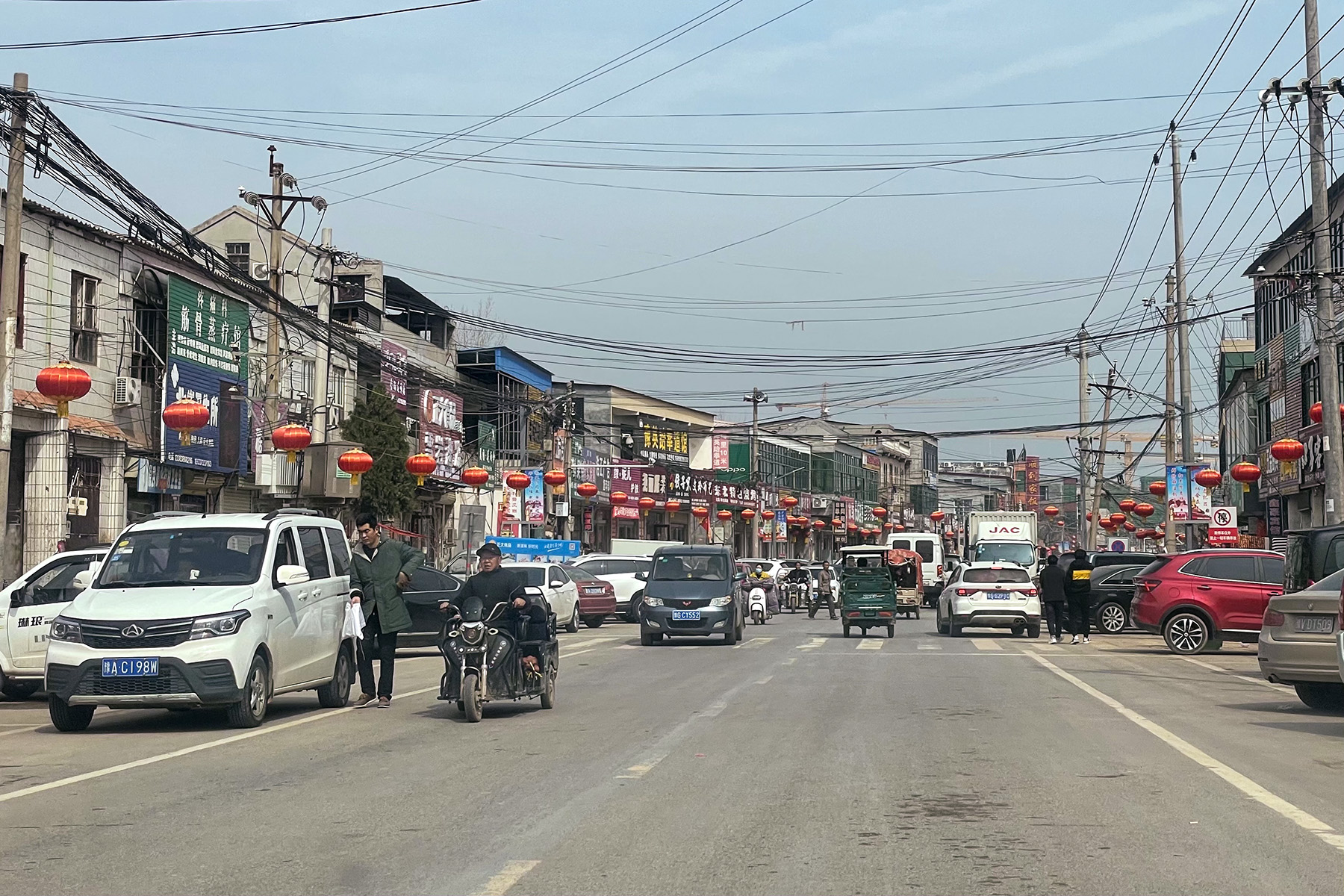

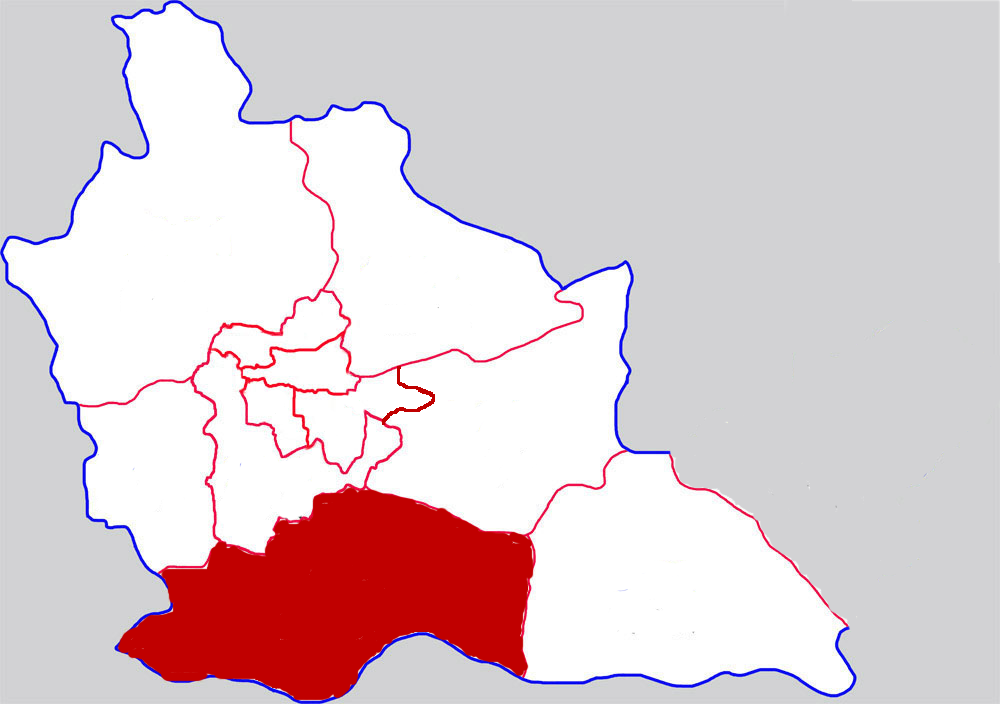
- Location of Yuanyang County in Xinxiang

- Location of the seat in Henan
- Coordinates: 35°03′56″N 113°56′24″E
- Country: People's Republic of China
- Province: Henan
- Prefecture-level city: Xinxiang

Area
  - Total: 1,339 km^{2} (517 sq mi)

Population (2019)
  - Total: 650,000
  - Density: 490/km^{2} (1,300/sq mi)
- Time zone: UTC+8 (China Standard)
- Postal code: 453500

Yuanyang County (simplified Chinese: 原阳县; traditional Chinese: 原陽縣; pinyin: Yuányáng Xiàn) is a county under the administration of the prefecture-level city of Xinxiang, in the north of Henan province, China. It covers an area of 1,329 square kilometres and has a population of 714,000 people. The People's Government of the county is located in Yanghe Street.

== Population ==
As of 00:00 on 1 November 2020, according to the statistical data of the seventh national population census: the resident population of Yuanyang County was 542,849 people.

As of the beginning of 2024, the resident population of Original County was 723,800.

== Geography ==
Yuanyang County is located on the north bank of the Yellow River, and is separated from Zhengzhou City, the capital of Henan Province, to the south. It is bordered by Wuzhi County of Jiaozuo City in the west, Huojia County, Xinxiang County and Yanjin County in the north, and Fengqiu County in the east.

The topography of the territory of Yuanyang County slopes from southwest to northeast. South of the Yellow River embankment are high flats with much dry land. The centre is low-lying and flood-prone, and north of the Wenyan Drain is a hillock. The main rivers include the Yellow River, Natural Drainage, Wenyan Drainage, and Happiness Drainage. The average annual temperature is 14.3°C, the average annual precipitation is 556 mm, and the annual frost-free period is 227 days.

== History ==
The territory of Yuanyang County belonged to the state of Wei during the Warring States period. Yangwu County was first established in the Qin Dynasty and came under Sanchuan County (Henan Commandery). In the Western Han Dynasty, Yuanwu County was set up in the present-day county seat, and Yangwu County was set up in the southeastern part of the county, and the Eastern Han Dynasty inherited the former system. During the Three Kingdoms period, it was occupied by the Cao Wei regime and belonged to Sili Province. During the Western Jin Dynasty, Yuanwu County was abolished and Yangwu County was transferred to Xingyang County. During the period of the Sixteen Kingdoms of the Eastern Jin Dynasty, it was successively occupied by the regimes of Later Zhao, Former Yan, Former Qin and Later Yan. During the Xiaochang period of the Northern Wei Dynasty, Yuanwu County was restored, and both Yuanwu and Yangwu Counties belonged to Xingyang County of the Si Prefecture. In the early years of Tianping of the Eastern Wei Dynasty, it was changed to Guangwu County. The two counties were abolished during the Northern Qi period. The two counties were restored during the Kaihuang period of the Sui Dynasty, and later changed Yuanwu to Yuanling. In the early Tang Dynasty, it was changed again from Yuanling to Yuanwu and belonged to Zhengzhou. During the Five Dynasties and Ten Kingdoms period, it was reclassified as part of Kaifeng Prefecture. In the fifth year of Xining of Emperor Shenzong of the Northern Song Dynasty (1072), Yuanwu County was downgraded to a town and merged into Yangwu County, which was returned to Kaifeng Prefecture of Jinggi Road. In the first year of Emperor Zhezong's reign (1086), Yuanwu County was reestablished as part of Zhengzhou on the North Jingxi Road. During the Jin Dynasty Yangwu belonged to Kaifengfu, and Yuanwu belonged to Zhengzhou, both under the Nanjing Road. During the Yuan Dynasty, the two counties belonged to Bianliang Road. In the early years of the Ming Dynasty, the two counties belonged to Kaifeng Prefecture. In the early years of the Qing Dynasty, following the Ming system, in the second year of the Yongzheng period (1724), Yuanwu County was transferred to the Huaiqing Prefecture, and in the Qianlong period, Yangwu County was also transferred to the Huaiqing Prefecture.

During the Republic of China period, the two counties came under the jurisdiction of Hebei Province in 1914 and were assigned to the Fourth Administrative Inspectorate of Henan Province in 1932.In 1936, Yuanwu County merged with Yangwu County to form Bolang County. It was restored in the same year. During the Second Sino-Japanese War, Yuanwu County and Yangwu County fell.In March 1945, the two counties in the liberated area built in the ‘Yuanyang County’ regime. And after the restoration of the nationalist government still set Yuanwu County, Yangwu County. After the outbreak of the Second Nationalist-Communist Civil War, there was a struggle between the Nationalists and the Communists over this area. During the Battle of North Henan in March 1947, the Jin-Hei-Lu-Yu field army occupied the county towns and strongholds of Puyang, Fengqiu, Yanjin, Yuanwu and Yangwu. By October 1948, the Communist regime controlled all of Yuanwu and Yangwu counties.Later, the People's Government of North China requested that the wartime administrative divisions be abolished and the old administrative structure be restored. The officials of Yuanyang County requested to keep it because of the small population of Yuanyang County.After the founding of the People's Republic of China in 1949, it belonged to Xinxiang Prefecture. Finally, on 13 March 1950, the People's Government of Pingyuan Province decreed that ‘the merger of the two counties of Yuanwu and Yangwu was approved, and the name was set to Yuanyang County’. In 1952, Plain Province was abolished, and Yuanyang County was transferred to Henan Province with Xinxiang Prefecture, and in January 1986 it has been under the jurisdiction of Xinxiang City since then.

Historically, during the Western Han Dynasty, Juan County was also set up in the territory of present-day Yuanyang County, belonging to Henan Commandery. Afterwards, it passed through the Eastern Han Dynasty, Cao Wei Dynasty and other dynasties, and was changed to Xingyang Commandery in Western Jin Dynasty until it was abolished during the Northern Qi Dynasty.

== Administrative divisions ==
The county is divided into 3 towns and 14 townships. The towns and townships in Yuanyang County are:

Towns

- Chengguan (城关镇)
- Yuanwu (原武镇)
- Shizhai (师寨镇)

Townships

- Gebukou Township (葛埠口乡)
- Funingji Township (福宁集乡)
- Zhulou Township (祝楼乡)
- Qiaobei Township (桥北乡)
- Handongzhuang Township (韩董庄乡)
- Jiangzhuang Township (蒋庄乡)
- Guanchang Township (官厂乡)
- Dabin Township (大宾乡)
- Doumen Township (陡门乡)
- Qijie Township (齐街乡)
- Taipingzhen Township (太平镇乡)
- Luzhai Township (路寨乡)
- Yang'a Township (阳阿乡)
- Jintang Township (靳堂乡)

Before 2005, Yuanyang County has 2 towns and 20 townships: Steep Gate Township, Chengguan Township, Yuanwu Township, Taiping Township, Dabin Township, Wang Xinglan Township, Baochang Township, Qijie Township, Yanga Township, Shi Zhai Township, Steep Gate Township, Guanchang Township, Guozhuang Township, Zhulou Township, Qiaobei Township, Heiyangshan Township, Liangzhai Township, Han Dongzhuang Township, Jiangzhuang Township, Lujai Township, Ge Bukou Township, Funingjie Township, Jintang Township. The county government is located in Chengguan Township.

Since 2005, Yuanyang County township zoning adjustments: abolish the Heiyangshan Township, its administrative area under the jurisdiction of Gebukou Township, Gebukou Township people's government residency remains unchanged;abolish the Wang Xinglan Township, its administrative area under the jurisdiction of the Funingjie Township, the Funingjie Township people's government residency remains unchanged;abolish the Baofang Township, its administrative area under the jurisdiction of Jintang Township, the Jintang Township people's government residency remains unchanged;abolish the Liangzhai Township, its Liangzhai Township was abolished and its administrative area was transferred to the jurisdiction of Taiping Township, and the residence of the People's Government of Taiping Township remained unchanged;Guozhuang Township was abolished and its administrative area was transferred to the jurisdiction of Steep Gate Township, and the residence of the People's Government of Steep Gate Township remained unchanged.

=== Successive county commissioners ===
Fan Xuegui: 1994.05-1995.09

Sun Guofu: 2006.04-2010

Li Jufeng: 2010.03-2015.04

Duan Changqing: 2015.06-2015.10

Guo Liming: 2015.11-2021.07

Liu Bing: 2021.07-2025.02

Yang Xinyi: 2025.02-

== Climate ==
Climate data for Yuanyang, elevation 76 m (249 ft), (1991–2020 normals, extremes 1981–2010)
Month	Jan	Feb	Mar	Apr	May	Jun	Jul	Aug	Sep	Oct	Nov	Dec	Year
Record high °C (°F)	18.7 (65.7)	24.4 (75.9)	28.5 (83.3)	35.7 (96.3)	38.0 (100.4)	40.8 (105.4)	40.0 (104.0)	37.8 (100.0)	37.4 (99.3)	34.3 (93.7)	27.2 (81.0)	22.4 (72.3)	40.8 (105.4)
Mean daily maximum °C (°F)	5.5 (41.9)	9.6 (49.3)	15.3 (59.5)	21.7 (71.1)	27.2 (81.0)	32.1 (89.8)	31.9 (89.4)	30.4 (86.7)	26.9 (80.4)	21.8 (71.2)	14.0 (57.2)	7.4 (45.3)	20.3 (68.6)
Daily mean °C (°F)	0.1 (32.2)	3.7 (38.7)	9.3 (48.7)	15.5 (59.9)	21.1 (70.0)	26.0 (78.8)	27.2 (81.0)	25.7 (78.3)	21.1 (70.0)	15.6 (60.1)	8.2 (46.8)	2.1 (35.8)	14.6 (58.4)
Mean daily minimum °C (°F)	−4.3 (24.3)	−1.0 (30.2)	4.0 (39.2)	9.8 (49.6)	15.3 (59.5)	20.5 (68.9)	23.3 (73.9)	22.0 (71.6)	16.7 (62.1)	10.8 (51.4)	3.6 (38.5)	−2.1 (28.2)	9.9 (49.8)
Record low °C (°F)	−15.6 (3.9)	−16.0 (3.2)	−7.7 (18.1)	−0.9 (30.4)	3.2 (37.8)	10.7 (51.3)	17.4 (63.3)	11.7 (53.1)	6.0 (42.8)	−1.8 (28.8)	−10.9 (12.4)	−12.9 (8.8)	−16.0 (3.2)
Average precipitation mm (inches)	6.7 (0.26)	9.8 (0.39)	15.3 (0.60)	32.5 (1.28)	49.8 (1.96)	63.2 (2.49)	154.6 (6.09)	116.7 (4.59)	65.2 (2.57)	30.4 (1.20)	22.0 (0.87)	5.7 (0.22)	571.9 (22.52)
Average precipitation days (≥ 0.1 mm)	2.8	3.5	4.2	5.2	6.6	7.1	10.8	9.3	7.6	6.0	4.6	2.6	70.3
Average snowy days	3.3	2.9	1.1	0.2	0	0	0	0	0	0	1.3	2.4	11.2
Average relative humidity (%)	61	60	61	65	67	64	80	83	78	70	67	62	68
Mean monthly sunshine hours	115.8	130.7	170.8	198.1	218.9	199.3	172.9	172.7	151.6	145.9	132.4	126.4	1,935.5
Percentage possible sunshine	37	42	46	50	50	46	39	42	41	42	43	42	43
Source: China Meteorological Administration
