= Dang (surname) =

Dang (鄭, 黨, 唐, 滕) is a Chinese, Vietnamese and Korean surname. It can also be found in both Punjabi Hindus and Sikhs (in Punjabi, ਡਾੰਗ).

== Chinese Dang: 黨 (Tang) ==
Dang (黨; it also means "party, association") in Cantonese (Dong2 in Jyutping) is transliterated as Dǎng in pinyin and Đặng in Vietnamese. origin from

- Xia dynasty people, Xia (夏) clan
- region name of Shangdang (上党), Changzhi, Jin (Chinese state) people, branch of Zheng (鄭) clan
- Qiang people (Chang people)
- Hui people, branch of Cui/Choi clan
- Modern Chinese with new surname

== Chinese and Korean Dang: 唐 (Tang) ==
Dang in Korean is transliterated as Táng in pinyin and Đường in Vietnamese. origin from

- Huang Di at Legend Time 26th century BCE, Gongsun (公孫) family
- Qi (祁) family of Yao tribe at 24th century BCE, branch of Liu (劉) clan
- Danzhu (丹朱), son of Emperor Yao
- Shu Yu of Tang (唐叔虞) in Tang (state), younger brother of King Cheng of Zhou 1042 BC, branch of Zheng (鄭) clan
- Qiang people (羌) of Gansu state, branch of Jin (金) clan

People, Dang;

- Dang Ye-seo

== Chinese and Vietnamese Dang: Deng 鄧 ==
In Vietnam, the surname is correctly spelled Đặng and it is a popular Vietnamese name unlike in China and Korea. The name Đặng is transliterated as Deng in Chinese and Deung in Korean, all come from the word 鄧. It may originate from:

- State of Deng, a small state in Spring and Autumn period in China
- The Clan of Man (曼姓), the ruling clan of State of Deng. Later, they used state's name (Deng) as their surname.
- Huang Di, branch of Qi (祁) clan

The origin of Vietnamese "Đặng" remains unclear, however it is assumed that the native people of Vietnam had adopted the surname from Chinese literature and history. People with the surname Đặng:

Đặng (鄧) family Vietnamese five-colour flag

- Đặng Dung (鄧容, 1373 - 1414), was the poet and general of the later Tran Dynasty
- Đặng Trần Côn (鄧陳琨 c. 1705–1745) was one of the great poets in early modern history of Vietnam
- Trường Chinh (born Đặng Xuân Khu), Vietnamese communist leader
- Đặng Thị Minh Hạnh, Vietnamese fashion designer
- Đặng Thị Ngọc Thịnh, Vietnamese politician
- Đặng Nhật Minh, Vietnamese film director
- Đặng Ngọc Ngự, Vietnamese pilot
- Đặng Văn Ngữ, Vietnamese doctor and intellectual.
- Đặng Phong, Vietnamese historian, specialized in Vietnam's economic history
- Đặng Hữu Phúc, Vietnamese pianist and film score composer
- Đặng Thái Sơn, Vietnamese pianist
- Đặng Thân, Vietnamese bilingual poet, fiction writer and essayist
- Đặng Thùy Trâm, Vietnamese doctor famous for her wartime diaries
- Đặng Hùng Dương, Vietnamese software developer famous for his PUBG application
- Johnny Dang (born Đặng Anh Tuấn), Vietnamese-American Jeweler
- Stephanie Murphy (born Đặng Thị Ngọc Dung), American congresswoman*
- Thai Dang, Vietnamese chef based in Chicago

== Fuzhounese Dang: 鄭 (Zheng) ==
- Fuzhounese surname from the Fuzhou dialect.

== Fictional characters ==
- Alexis Thi Dang, a Vietnamese American girl in the Transformers Unicron Trilogy
- Dr. Michael Dang, chief antagonist in the Hindi movie Karma.

== See also ==
- Deng
- Teng
- Tang
- Dhang
