= Zhu Changfang =

Chinese prince and calligrapher (1608–1646)

Zhu Changfang 朱常淓

Regent of the Southern Ming dynasty
- Tenure: 1 July – 6 July 1645
- Predecessor: Zhu Yousong, Prince of Fu
- Successor: Zhu Yujian, Prince of Tang

Prince of Lu (潞)
- Tenure: 1618–1645
- Predecessor: Zhu Yiliu, Prince Jian
- Born: 1608; Mansion of Prince of Lu, Weihui, Henan Province
- Died: 23 May 1646 (aged 37–38); Yanjing
Posthumous name
- Prince Min of Lu (潞閔王)
- House: Zhu
- Father: Zhu Yiliu, Prince Jian of Lu
- Mother: Lady Yang

Zhu Changfang (Chinese: 朱常淓; pinyin: Zhū Chángfāng), also known as the Jingyi Taoist (敬一道人; 1608–1646) was the last Prince of Lu (潞王) (an area claimed by one source as being near Hangzhou and by another as being centered on Weihui in Henan). Zhu Changfang was an important member of the Imperial family of the Southern Ming dynasty during the Ming-Qing transition. He is notable both due to his historical political role and as a creative artist.

== Life ==
Zhu Changfang was the son of Zhu Yiliu (簡王翊鏐) and the grandson of the Longqing Emperor. He inherited the title Prince of Lu from his father in 1618. After his father's death Zhu had an elaborate mausoleum constructed in Xinxiang County, covering over 157,000 square metres (39 acres). The mausoleum incorporated several unorthodox elements, including a separate grave for his father's concubine, a greater number of guards than normal, and novel animal sculptures.

When Zhang Xianzhong and Li Zicheng rebelled against the Chongzhen Emperor, Zhu applied to the throne for permission to undertake military action against the rebels. However his campaign was unsuccessful and he was forced to flee to Hangzhou. After the Chongzhen Emperor's suicide in 1644, Zhu was petitioned by his advisors Shi Kefa and Gao Hongtu (高弘圖) to assume the throne in exile, however it was his relative Zhu Yousong who eventually took the throne as the Hongguang Emperor. He was executed in 1646 in Beijing, after surrendering to the Qing dynasty along with a number of other Southern Ming princes.

== Works ==
Zhu Changfang was a noted practitioner of calligraphy and traditional Chinese painting, as well as being a musician who performed on the guqin. He made (or oversaw the making of) over 300 guqin, created a new type of guqin incorporating Western design elements, and developed a guqin musical style he termed the "Central Harmony". He also wrote a treatise on the instrument, the Guyin Zhengzong (古音正宗）, in 1634, as well as a book on Chinese chess. Zhu's main literary output was, however, biographical; he composed a considerable number of biographies of imperial personages.

Zhu's calligraphy was well-regarded by contemporary critics. His calligraphy was patterned after that of Wang Xizhi, and he produced calligraphic and artistic works in several styles. He was responsible for inscriptions at the City God Temple at Weihui and the Western Great Temple in Zhonghe, as well as many other inscriptions and scrolls, but after his death his work was largely overlooked, to the extent that one of his bronze inscriptions was listed in a Qing catalogue of antiquaries as being from the Zhou dynasty (which ended over 1800 years before Zhu's birth).

== See also ==
- Eight Views of Xiaoxiang

Zhu Changfang House of Zhu; Prince of Lu's (潞) line (line of one of the Longqing Emperor's sons) Born: 1608 Died: 23 May 1646
Chinese royalty
Preceded by Zhu Yiliu, Prince Jian	Prince of Lu (潞); 1618–1645	Title abolished
Regnal titles
Preceded by Zhu Yousong, Prince of Fu	Regent of the Southern Ming dynasty 1 July – 6 July 1645	Succeeded by Zhu Yujian, Prince of Tang
