= Wangcun Township, Fengqiu County =

Wangcun Township 王村乡
- Township
- Location in Henan
- Coordinates: 35°03′57″N 114°25′10″E
- Country: People's Republic of China
- Province: Henan
- Prefecture-level city: Xinxiang
- County: Fengqiu
- Elevation: 72 m (236 ft)
- Time zone: UTC+8 (China Standard)

Wangcun (Chinese: 王村; pinyin: Wángcūn) is a township in Fengqiu County in northern Henan province, China, located immediately north of the county seat. As of 2011, it has 8 residential communities (社区) and 42 villages under its administration.

== See also ==
- List of township-level divisions of Henan
