= Taishan, Henan =

Taishan 太山镇
- Town
- Location in Henan
- Coordinates: 35°11′18″N 113°41′40″E
- Country: People's Republic of China
- Province: Henan
- Prefecture-level city: Xinxiang
- County: Huojia
- Village-level divisions: 26 villages
- Elevation: 84 m (276 ft)
- Time zone: UTC+8 (China Standard)
- Area code: 0373

Taishan (Chinese: 太山; pinyin: Tàishān) is a town of Huojia County in northwestern Henan province, China, located around 9 kilometres (5.6 mi) southeast of the county seat. As of 2018, it has 26 villages under its administration.

== See also ==
- List of township-level divisions of Henan
