= Renaibao =

Traditional local dessert from Xinxiang, Henan Province, China

- Type: Rice cake
- Course: Dessert, snack
- Place of origin: Xinxiang, Henan, China
- Main ingredients: Glutinous rice, cream, sugar, wafer

Renaibao
- Traditional Chinese: 熱奶寶
- Simplified Chinese: 热奶宝
Transcriptions
Standard Mandarin
- Hanyu Pinyin: rènǎibǎo
Yue: Cantonese
- Yale Romanization: rènǎibǎu

Renaibao (Chinese: 熱奶寶) is a traditional local dessert from Xinxiang, Henan Province, China. It is a hot dessert made of glutinous rice and cream, and is also known as Hot ice cream for its similar appearance to an ice cream cone.

== Preparation ==
The most common Renaibao is glutinous rice in wafers with a layer of sweet cream on top. The cream soaks into and softens the glutinous rice. In some areas, the glutinous rice is replaced with red bean paste, the sweet cream is replaced with yogurt, or small toppings such as peanut chips and chocolate chips are added on top.

== Spread and popularity ==
With the spread of the Internet, Renaibao became one of the popular snacks in mainland China, and was quickly introduced to Taiwan, where it also became popular.

== Variations ==
In some areas of China, because of the weather, people turn Renaibao into cold food and call it Bingnaibao (Chinese:冰奶寶).
