= Xinxiang Medical University =

Medical university in Xinxiang, Henan, China

Coordinates: 35.2100°N 113.5000°E

- 新乡医学院
- Type: Public
- Established: 1950; 75 years ago
- Location: Xinxiang, Henan, China

Xinxiang Medical University (Chinese: 新乡医学院) is located at Xinxiang city in the northern part of Henan province of China. The origin of the school can be traced back to the western medicine clinic opened by Dr. Luo Weiling in 1896 in the ancient city of Weihui, and medical education began in 1922 at the Huimin Hospital Nursing School.

Xinxiang Medical University has a vast campus with about 7000 undergraduates.

The Foreign Students Programme of Xinxiang Medical University under the International Education Institute of XXMU, has been running successfully at the university since 2001.

More than 1000 foreign students from Nepal and India have already graduated from the university since 2001. There are more than 120 foreign students pursuing Western Medicine studies at this college.
