= Huangdi =

Huangdi (Wade–Giles: Huang-ti) may refer to:

- Yellow Emperor (黃帝), a legendary Chinese monarch who supposedly ruled before the Xia dynasty
- Emperor of China (皇帝), the imperial title of Chinese monarchs; and the superlative monarchical title in the Sinosphere

== Places ==
- Huangdi, Henan, a town in Huojia County, Henan, China
- Huangdi, Liaoning, a town in Suizhong County, Liaoning, China
- Huangdi, Xinjiang, a town in Yarkant County, Xinjiang, China
- Huangdi Township, a township in Longhua County, Hebei, China
