= Baoxi =

Baoxi may refer to:

- Fuxi, legendary leader of China, also known as Baoxi in some ancient texts
- Baoxi Subdistrict, Fengquan District, Xinxiang, Henan, China
- Baoxi Township in Longquan, Zhejiang, China
