= Weibin =

Weibin may refer to:

- Weibin District, Xinxiang (卫滨区), Henan, China
- Weibin District, Baoji (渭滨区), Shaanxi, China
