= Fengquan, Xinxiang =

Coordinates: 35°23′39″N 113°56′08″E

Fengquan 凤泉区
- District
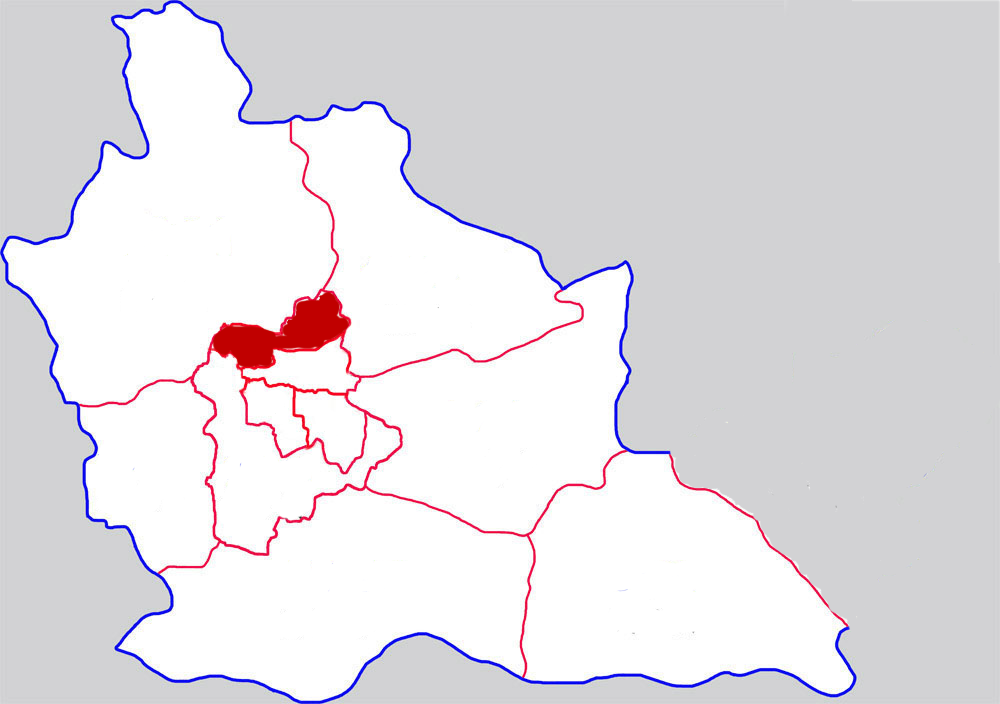
- Fengquan in Xinxiang

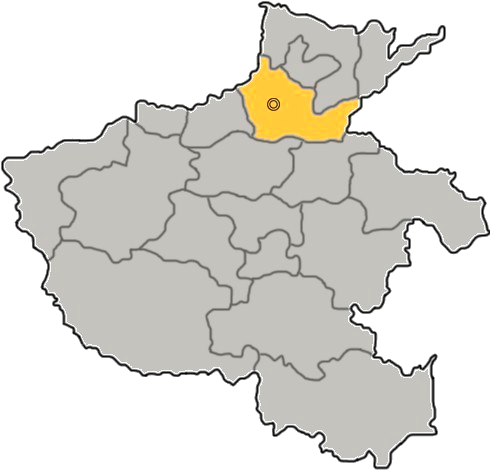
- Xinxiang in Henan
- Country: People's Republic of China
- Province: Henan
- Prefecture-level city: Xinxiang

Area
  - Total: 115 km^{2} (44 sq mi)

Population (2019)
  - Total: 158,400
  - Density: 1,380/km^{2} (3,570/sq mi)
- Time zone: UTC+8 (China Standard)
- Postal code: 453011
- Division code: FQQ

Fengquan District (simplified Chinese: 凤泉; traditional Chinese: 鳳泉; pinyin: Fèngquán; lit. 'phoenix spring') is a district of the city of Xinxiang, Henan province, China.

== Administrative divisions ==
As of 2012, this district is divided to 2 subdistricts, 1 town and 2 townships.

Subdistricts

- Baoxi Subdistrict (宝西街道)
- Baodong Subdistrict (宝东街道)

Towns

- Dakuai (大块镇)

Townships

- Luwangfen Township (潞王坟乡)
- Genghuang Township (耿黄乡)
