= Yanjin huoshao =

Chinese meat patty

Yanjin Huoshao (Chinese: 延津火烧) is a meat patty baked in a special oven. Yanjin Huoshao is larger than a shaobing and is made more crispy than a regular meatloaf. It is round in appearance, bulging in the middle, with clear layers, burnt on the outside and tender on the inside, fragrant but not greasy. It is a traditional snack unique to the north of Henan Province.

== History ==
Huoshao has long existed in the northern region of Henan, and it is said that Yanjin Huoshao is a representative of the Yanjin people's brave resistance. The people of Yanjin are simple and kind, with a strong character and a love for their hometown. They have built the beautiful Yanjin with their diligent hands. At that time, it was in the early stage of the founding of the People's Republic of China, and people's lives were very difficult. However, the Yanjin area was also plagued by sand disasters, making people's lives even more difficult.

So in order to solve this dilemma, the leading cadres mobilized everyone to plant trees and afforestation together. Trees can play a role in windbreak and sand fixation. According to the memories of the elderly, planting trees lasted for a whole day, and there was no time to go home to eat. People would bring a few Huoshao and eat a little when they were hungry. They thought to themselves that as long as they could build a good home, no matter how hard they worked, it would be worth it.

At that time, Yanjin Huoshao was the simplest method because it only needed to fill the stomach. Prepare the dough, sprinkle it with a handful of scallions, add some coarse salt, and grill it over high heat until cooked. It can be used as a dish or as dry food, which is very convenient and cheap.

== Development ==
To further develop the Yanjin huoshao industry, promoting the famous local cuisine and achieving branding is what many people think of. Some people have successfully applied for the protection of intangible cultural heritage. Registered trademarks such as "Wuchao" and "Dakouke". And innovative improvements have been made in traditional processing techniques and ingredient processes to create a new flavor of Yanjin Huoshao, which has a more delicate taste, a more delicious taste, a more dazzling appearance, and a continuous aroma.

== Production method ==
According to reports, the authentic Yanjin Huoshao practice is quite elaborate, high-quality to create the world's unparalleled Yanjin Huoshao, flour, oil, ingredients must be used with top quality products. Flour is China's first wheat origin Yanjin, meat is Shuanghui Zhongpin, seasoning is Lotus thirteen spices.

Mix flour with water. Use "shake hands water" (甩手水) at around 50 degrees Celsius in winter, "yin and yang water" (阴阳水) with half cold water and half boiling water in summer, and "top hands water" (顶手水) at 70 degrees Celsius in spring and autumn. When the weather is hot, one pound of flour needs to be mixed with about two taels of water, and when the weather is cold, one pound of flour needs to be mixed with half a pound of water. When mixing flour, knead vigorously and slowly until there is no water left in the bowl, and there is no raw flour left in the flour that has already been mixed together. The size of the dough should be moderate, and it should be tightly and slowly stretched during beating. It is required that the hands should not be separated from the oil, and the dough should not stick to the hands. Pull the dough as long as a belt, about an inch wide, then roll it into a top shape, spin it into shape, and press it flat.

When subjected to firepower for grilling, it will naturally expand and bulge out in the middle. Oil should be stored deep in the furnace groove frequently. After the Huoshao is burned into the furnace, it needs to be smoked vigorously and the fire should be simmering. Oil should be brushed from time to time until it is cooked and released. The process should be repeated in a cycle, taking as little as fifteen minutes and as long as half an hour, before it can be put into the furnace.
