= Baoxi Subdistrict =

Baoxi Subdistrict 宝西街道
- Subdistrict
- Location in Henan
- Coordinates: 35°23′30″N 113°54′9″E
- Country: People's Republic of China
- Province: Henan
- Prefecture-level city: Xinxiang
- District: Fengquan District
- Time zone: UTC+8 (China Standard)

Baoxi Subdistrict (simplified Chinese: 宝西街道; traditional Chinese: 寳西街道; pinyin: Bǎoxī Jiēdào) is a subdistrict in Fengquan District, Xinxiang, Henan, China. As of 2023, it administers five residential communities: Baoxi Community, Bailu Community (白鹭社区), Jinyuan Community (锦园社区), Xinghuhuayuan Community (星湖花园社区), and Gengzhuanghuayuan Community (耿庄花园社区).

== See also ==
- List of township-level divisions of Henan
