= Xinxiang Hygiene School =

Sanitation college

Xinxiang Hygiene School (simplified Chinese: 新乡卫生学校; traditional Chinese: 新鄉衛生學校) is a sanitation college in the Chinese city of Xinxiang.

The school was founded in 1951 as Henan Kaifeng Nursing School (Chinese: 河南省开封护校). It was renamed to Henan Xinxiang Health School (Chinese: 河南省新乡卫生学校) and then Xinxiang Medical College (Chinese: 新乡医学院) in 1958. The most recent rename to Xinxiang Hygiene School (Chinese: 新乡卫生学校) happened in 1960.

The school has 253 faculty members and over 3,000 students. The campus takes up roughly 90 acres.
