= Wangcun, Xinxiang =

Wangcun 王村镇
- Town
- Location in Henan
- Coordinates: 35°19′27″N 113°50′32″E
- Country: People's Republic of China
- Province: Henan
- Prefecture-level city: Xinxiang
- District: Muye
- Elevation: 74 m (243 ft)
- Time zone: UTC+8 (China Standard)
- Postal code: 453000

Wangcun (Chinese: 王村; pinyin: Wángcūn) is a town in Muye District, Xinxiang, Henan, People's Republic of China, located at the northwestern periphery of Xinxiang's urban area. As of 2011, it has one residential community (社区) and 19 villages under its administration.

== See also ==
- List of township-level divisions of Henan
