= Hongqi, Xinxiang =

District in China

Hongqi 红旗区
- District
- Location in Henan
- Coordinates: 35°17′16″N 113°56′03″E
- Country: People's Republic of China
- Province: Henan
- Prefecture-level city: Xinxiang

Area
  - Total: 99 km^{2} (38 sq mi)

Population (2019)
  - Total: 456,400
  - Density: 4,600/km^{2} (12,000/sq mi)
- Time zone: UTC+8 (China Standard)
- Postal code: 453000

Hongqi District (simplified Chinese: 红旗区; traditional Chinese: 紅旗區; pinyin: Hóngqí Qū; lit. 'red flag') is a district and the municipal seat of the city of Xinxiang, Henan province, China.

== Administrative divisions ==
As of 2012, this district is divided to 5 subdistricts, 2 towns and 1 township.

Subdistricts

- Xijie Subdistrict (西街街道)
- Dongjie Subdistrict (东街街道)
- Qudong Subdistrict (渠东街道)
- Nangandao Subdistrict (南干道街道)
- Xiangyangxiaoqu Subdistrict (向阳小区街道)

Towns

- Hongmen (洪门镇)
- Xiaodian (小店镇)

Townships

- Guandi Township (关堤乡)
