= Changyuan =

Changyuan 长垣市
- County-level city
- Location of the seat in Henan
- Coordinates: 35.2125°N 114.735°E
- Country: People's Republic of China
- Province: Henan
- Prefecture-level city: Xinxiang

Area
  - Total: 1,051 km^{2} (406 sq mi)

Population (2019)
  - Total: 789,300
  - Density: 751.0/km^{2} (1,945/sq mi)
- Time zone: UTC+8 (China Standard)
- Postal code: 453400
- Division code: HXS
- Website: www.changyuan.gov.cn

Changyuan (simplified Chinese: 长垣市; traditional Chinese: 長垣市; pinyin: Chángyuán Shì) is a county-level city in the east of Henan province, China, bordering Shandong province to the east. Formerly under the administration of the prefecture-level city of Xinxiang, since 1 January 2014 it has been directly administered by the province.

== Administration ==
Subdistricts:

- Puxi Subdistrict (蒲西街道), Pudong Subdistrict (蒲东街道), Nanpu Subdistrict (南蒲街道), Pubei Subdistrict (蒲北街道)

Towns:

- Dingluan (丁栾镇), Xiangxiang (樊相镇), Weizhuang (魏庄镇), Naoli (恼里镇), Changcun (常村镇), Zhaodi (赵堤镇), Menggang (孟岗镇), Mancun (满村镇)

Townships:

- Lugang Township (芦岗乡), Miaozhai Township (苗寨乡), Fangli Township (方里乡), Wuqiu Township (武邱乡), Shejia Township (佘家乡), Zhangsanzhai Township (张三寨乡)

== Climate ==
Climate data for Changyuan, elevation 62 m (203 ft), (1991–2020 normals, extremes 1981–2010)
| Month | Jan | Feb | Mar | Apr | May | Jun | Jul | Aug | Sep | Oct | Nov | Dec | Year |
|---|---|---|---|---|---|---|---|---|---|---|---|---|---|
| Record high °C (°F) | 17.7 (63.9) | 24.9 (76.8) | 27.5 (81.5) | 33.4 (92.1) | 37.7 (99.9) | 40.6 (105.1) | 40.3 (104.5) | 37.2 (99.0) | 36.8 (98.2) | 34.7 (94.5) | 26.7 (80.1) | 22.1 (71.8) | 40.6 (105.1) |
| Mean daily maximum °C (°F) | 5.1 (41.2) | 9.0 (48.2) | 15.8 (60.4) | 21.6 (70.9) | 27.1 (80.8) | 32.2 (90.0) | 32.0 (89.6) | 30.5 (86.9) | 26.8 (80.2) | 21.6 (70.9) | 13.6 (56.5) | 6.6 (43.9) | 20.2 (68.3) |
| Daily mean °C (°F) | 0.1 (32.2) | 3.7 (38.7) | 10.0 (50.0) | 15.8 (60.4) | 21.5 (70.7) | 26.4 (79.5) | 27.4 (81.3) | 26.0 (78.8) | 21.6 (70.9) | 16.0 (60.8) | 8.4 (47.1) | 1.8 (35.2) | 14.9 (58.8) |
| Mean daily minimum °C (°F) | −3.6 (25.5) | −0.4 (31.3) | 5.2 (41.4) | 10.7 (51.3) | 16.4 (61.5) | 21.3 (70.3) | 23.7 (74.7) | 22.5 (72.5) | 17.6 (63.7) | 11.7 (53.1) | 4.3 (39.7) | −1.8 (28.8) | 10.6 (51.2) |
| Record low °C (°F) | −15.6 (3.9) | −13.3 (8.1) | −8.0 (17.6) | −0.4 (31.3) | 5.1 (41.2) | 12.2 (54.0) | 17.6 (63.7) | 12.4 (54.3) | 7.7 (45.9) | −2.3 (27.9) | −11.9 (10.6) | −15.4 (4.3) | −15.6 (3.9) |
| Average precipitation mm (inches) | 7.4 (0.29) | 10.5 (0.41) | 17.1 (0.67) | 34.9 (1.37) | 53.1 (2.09) | 69.2 (2.72) | 159.6 (6.28) | 131.7 (5.19) | 69.0 (2.72) | 29.7 (1.17) | 25.6 (1.01) | 7.6 (0.30) | 615.4 (24.22) |
| Average precipitation days (≥ 0.1 mm) | 3.1 | 3.6 | 4.3 | 5.0 | 6.1 | 7.3 | 10.1 | 9.2 | 7.4 | 5.8 | 5.1 | 2.9 | 69.9 |
| Average snowy days | 3.7 | 3.2 | 1.0 | 0.3 | 0 | 0 | 0 | 0 | 0 | 0 | 1.2 | 2.5 | 11.9 |
| Average relative humidity (%) | 62 | 59 | 58 | 63 | 64 | 61 | 76 | 79 | 73 | 67 | 67 | 64 | 66 |
| Mean monthly sunshine hours | 118.0 | 126.9 | 174.2 | 201.9 | 219.6 | 196.2 | 173.4 | 169.4 | 157.6 | 151.3 | 135.5 | 125.0 | 1,949 |
| Percentage possible sunshine | 38 | 41 | 47 | 51 | 51 | 45 | 40 | 41 | 43 | 44 | 44 | 41 | 44 |
Source: China Meteorological Administration

== Economy ==
Changyuan is an important industrial base. Most notably the city has a production capacity of 260,000 cranes a year, composing 68% of the Chinese crane market. Other industries clustered around the city are medical equipment and hygiene supplies and anti-corrosion materials. The city has been named the 'Chinese capital of medical consumables'. Presumably, local farmers started making cotton swabs and balls in the 1970s, laying the groundwork for this industry.
