= Muye, Xinxiang =

Muye 牧野区
- District
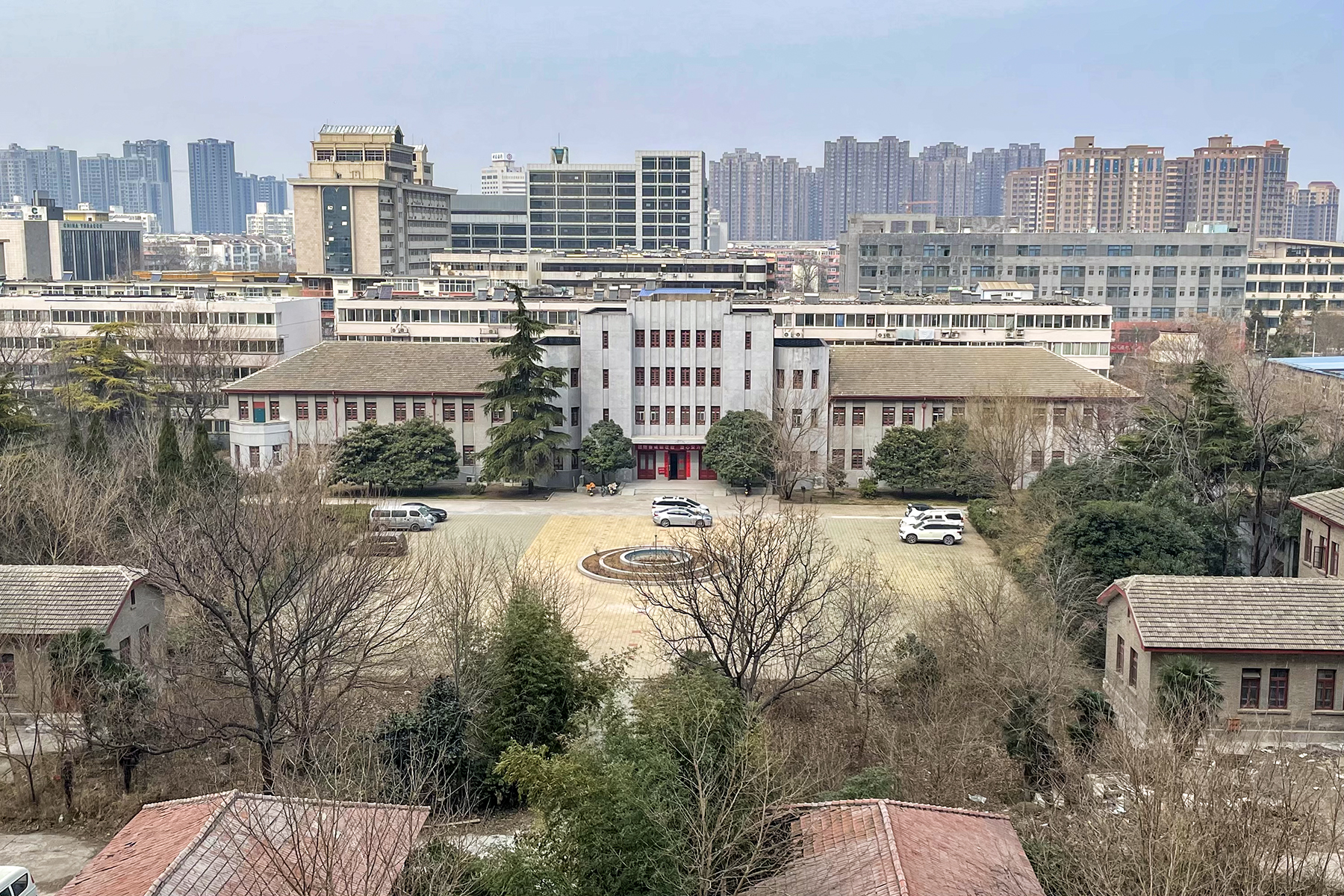
- Site of the former CPC Pingyuan Provincial Committee

- Location in Henan
- Coordinates: 35°18′54″N 113°54′32″E
- Country: People's Republic of China
- Province: Henan
- Prefecture-level city: Xinxiang

Area
  - Total: 89.2 km^{2} (34.4 sq mi)

Population (2019)
  - Total: 340,900
  - Density: 3,820/km^{2} (9,900/sq mi)
- Time zone: UTC+8 (China Standard)
- Postal code: 453002

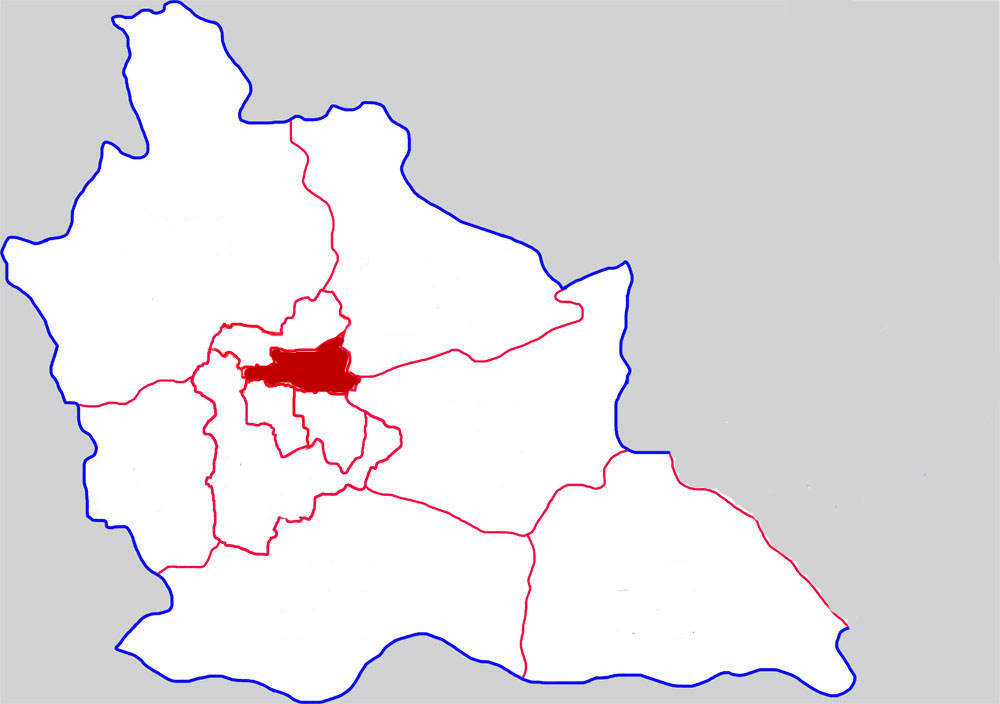
Location of Muye (牧野) district in Xinxiang city, Henan, China

Muye District (Chinese: 牧野; pinyin: Mùyě) is a district of the city of Xinxiang, Henan province, China.

== History ==
The c. 1046 BC Battle of Muye ended Shang hegemony over the Wei and Yellow Rivers and established the state of Zhou.

== Administrative divisions ==
As of 2021, Muye District has 2 towns and 7 streets and has 1 provincial industrial cluster.

=== Streets ===
- Beigandao street (北干道街道)
- Xinhuilu street (新辉路街道)
- Huayuan street (花园街道)
- Rongxiaolu street (荣校路街道)
- Weibei street (卫北街道)
- Donggandao street (冻干道街道)
- Hepinglu street (和平路街道)

=== Towns ===
- Wangcun town (王村镇)
- Muye town (牧野镇)

== Geographic Information ==
=== Location Information ===
Muye District is located in the north of Henan Province and the north-central part of downtown Xinxiang City. The total area is 89.2 square kilometers.

== Education ==
- Henan Normal University(河南师范大学)
