= Henan Commandery =

Commandery in China from Han dynasty to Tang dynasty

Henan Commandery (Chinese: 河南郡) was a commandery in China from Han dynasty to Tang dynasty, located in modern northern Henan province.

During the reign of King Xuanhui of Han, Sanchuan Commandery (三川郡) was established. It was named Sanchuan ("Three Rivers") because the Yellow River, Yi River and Luo River flowed through its jurisdiction. In 249 BC, Sanchuan was annexed by the state of Qin.

After the establishment of Han dynasty, in 205 BC, Sanchuan was renamed Henan ("south of the Yellow River"). Its seat was Luoyang, the former capital of Zhou dynasty. In 113 BC, its western half was split off to form Hongnong Commandery. In 2 AD, the commandery had 274,666 households and a population of 1,740,279. It administered 22 counties: Luoyang (雒陽), Xingyang (滎陽), Yanshi (偃師), Jing (京), Pingyin (平陰), Zhongmu (中牟), Ping (平), Yangwu (陽武), Henan (河南), Goushi (緱氏), Quan (卷), Yuanwu (原武), Gong (鞏), Gucheng (穀成), Gushi (故市), Mi (密), Xincheng (新城), Kaifeng (開封), Chenggao (成皋), Yuanling (苑陵), Liang (梁) and Xinzheng (新鄭).

In Eastern Han dynasty, the capital was moved to Luoyang, and Henan Commandery was renamed Henan Yin (河南尹, "Intendant of Henan") after the name of the chief administrative office of the area, following the naming of Jingzhao Yin in Western Han dynasty. In 140 AD, the commandery had 208,486 households and a population of 1,100,827.

In the Western Jin dynasty, the name "Henan Commandery" was restored. In 266, Xingyang Commandery was established from 8 counties in Henan.

After the establishment of Sui dynasty, Henan Commandery was abolished and merged into Luo Prefecture (洛州). In 607, the old name was restored. The commandery administered 18 counties, and had 202,230 households. In Tang dynasty, Henan Commandery was an alternative name of Luo Prefecture, also known as Henan Prefecture (河南府). In 741 AD, it had 194,746 households and the population was 1,183,092.
