= Huangdi, Henan =

Huangdi 黄堤镇
- Town
- Location in Henan
- Coordinates: 35°14′43″N 113°32′34″E
- Country: People's Republic of China
- Province: Henan
- Prefecture-level city: Xinxiang
- County: Huojia County
- Time zone: UTC+8 (China Standard)

Huangdi (Chinese: 黄堤; pinyin: Huángdī) is a town under the administration of Huojia County, Henan, China. As of 2020, it administers the following eleven villages:

- Huangdi Village
- Nanmachang Village (南马厂村)
- Beimachang Village (北马厂村)
- Jiangying Village (江营村)
- Shiziying Village (狮子营村)
- Anyi Village (安仪村)
- Sunzhuang Village (孙庄村)
- Zhangzhaizhuang Village (张翟庄村)
- Liuqiao Village (刘桥村)
- Ximachang Village (西马厂村)
- Zhongmachang Village (中马厂村)
