= Yanjin County, Henan =

County in Henan, China

Yanjin 延津县 Yentsing
- County
- Yanjin County
- Location of the seat in Henan
- Coordinates: 35°09′57″N 114°12′21″E
- Country: People's Republic of China
- Province: Henan
- Prefecture-level city: Xinxiang

Area
  - Total: 886 km^{2} (342 sq mi)

Population (2019)
  - Total: 456,900
  - Density: 516/km^{2} (1,340/sq mi)
- Time zone: UTC+8 (China Standard)
- Postal code: 453200
- Area code: 0373

Yanjin County (Chinese: 延津; pinyin: Yánjīn) is a county under the administration of the prefecture-level city of Xinxiang, in the north of Henan province, China.

== Geography ==
=== Location ===
Yanjin County is located at 35°10′N 114°36′E, in the north of Henan. The county is situated in the Central Plains City Cluster on the north bank of the Yellow River. It is 37 km (23 mi) from Xinxiang to the west, 93 km (58 mi) from Zhengzhou to the south, 50 km (31 mi) from Kaifeng to the southeast, and 130 km (81 mi) from Anyang to the north. The area is 45.5 km (28.3 mi) long from north to south and 42.5 km (26.4 mi) wide from east to west, with a total area of 886 square kilometres (342 sq mi).

=== Terrain and landforms ===
Yanjin County is located in the Yellow River basin. The entire area is composed of plains, with no mountains; the northern portion of the county has several rolling sand dunes.

=== Climate ===
Yanjin County is a humid continental monsoon climate (Köppen: Dwa, bordering on Cwa), with four distinct seasons, cold, dry winters and hot, humid summers. The annual average temperature is 14.1 °C (57.4 °F). July is the hottest month, with an average of 26.8 °C (80.2 °F). January is the coldest month, with an average of −0.4 °C (31.3 °F). The annual average precipitation is 5,842 mm (230.0 in), with most of the rainfall occurring during the summer and the winter months being the driest. The frost-free period is around 220 days, and the mean annual number of sunshine hours is 2,155 hours, with May being the sunniest month and January being the cloudiest.

Climate data for Yanjin, elevation 71 m (233 ft), (1991–2020 normals, extremes 1981–2010)
| Month | Jan | Feb | Mar | Apr | May | Jun | Jul | Aug | Sep | Oct | Nov | Dec | Year |
|---|---|---|---|---|---|---|---|---|---|---|---|---|---|
| Record high °C (°F) | 18.6 (65.5) | 25.4 (77.7) | 27.4 (81.3) | 34.5 (94.1) | 37.2 (99.0) | 40.6 (105.1) | 39.1 (102.4) | 36.9 (98.4) | 37.1 (98.8) | 33.8 (92.8) | 27.5 (81.5) | 22.5 (72.5) | 40.6 (105.1) |
| Mean daily maximum °C (°F) | 5.2 (41.4) | 9.3 (48.7) | 15.1 (59.2) | 21.3 (70.3) | 26.8 (80.2) | 32.1 (89.8) | 31.8 (89.2) | 30.4 (86.7) | 26.8 (80.2) | 21.6 (70.9) | 13.7 (56.7) | 7.1 (44.8) | 20.1 (68.2) |
| Daily mean °C (°F) | −0.1 (31.8) | 3.6 (38.5) | 9.2 (48.6) | 15.3 (59.5) | 21.0 (69.8) | 26.0 (78.8) | 27.3 (81.1) | 25.8 (78.4) | 21.2 (70.2) | 15.5 (59.9) | 8.0 (46.4) | 1.8 (35.2) | 14.6 (58.2) |
| Mean daily minimum °C (°F) | −4.4 (24.1) | −1.1 (30.0) | 3.9 (39.0) | 9.6 (49.3) | 15.2 (59.4) | 20.4 (68.7) | 23.3 (73.9) | 22.0 (71.6) | 16.6 (61.9) | 10.5 (50.9) | 3.4 (38.1) | −2.5 (27.5) | 9.7 (49.5) |
| Record low °C (°F) | −16.0 (3.2) | −15.1 (4.8) | −6.4 (20.5) | −1.2 (29.8) | 4.5 (40.1) | 9.8 (49.6) | 16.5 (61.7) | 11.4 (52.5) | 5.0 (41.0) | −1.6 (29.1) | −13.7 (7.3) | −14.0 (6.8) | −16.0 (3.2) |
| Average precipitation mm (inches) | 5.6 (0.22) | 9.4 (0.37) | 14.6 (0.57) | 32.9 (1.30) | 52.3 (2.06) | 69.3 (2.73) | 162.1 (6.38) | 124.0 (4.88) | 64.6 (2.54) | 29.4 (1.16) | 21.0 (0.83) | 5.6 (0.22) | 590.8 (23.26) |
| Average precipitation days (≥ 0.1 mm) | 2.4 | 3.4 | 4.1 | 5.0 | 6.3 | 7.2 | 10.6 | 9.0 | 7.3 | 6.0 | 4.6 | 2.7 | 68.6 |
| Average snowy days | 3.6 | 3.1 | 1.3 | 0.3 | 0 | 0 | 0 | 0 | 0 | 0 | 1.1 | 2.7 | 12.1 |
| Average relative humidity (%) | 59 | 59 | 59 | 65 | 66 | 63 | 78 | 81 | 76 | 68 | 67 | 62 | 67 |
| Mean monthly sunshine hours | 132.0 | 139.7 | 191.5 | 218.9 | 237.8 | 220.0 | 195.3 | 194.7 | 170.0 | 168.2 | 148.4 | 138.5 | 2,155 |
| Percentage possible sunshine | 42 | 45 | 51 | 56 | 55 | 51 | 45 | 47 | 46 | 49 | 48 | 46 | 48 |
Source: China Meteorological Administration

== Administrative divisions ==
As of October 2021, Yanjin County has thirteen county-level administrative districts, including three districts, four towns and six townships.

=== Districts ===
- Wenyan District (文岩街道)
- Tanlong District (潭龙街道)
- Tapu District (塔铺街道)

=== Towns ===
- Shipogu Town (石婆固镇)
- Dongtun Town (东屯镇)
- Fengzhuang Town (丰庄镇)
- Wanglou Town (王楼镇)

=== Townships ===
- Senggu Township (僧固乡)
- Weiqiu Township (魏邱乡)
- Sizhai Township (司寨乡)
- Mazhuang Township (马庄乡)
- Zuocheng Township (胙城乡)
- Yulin Township (榆林乡)

== Natural resources ==
Yanjin County is located in the Yellow River basin, with 200 million cubic metres of undeveloped state-owned sand dunes and sandy wastelands in the territory, and there is sufficient land for construction.

== Culture ==
Dapingdiao is one of the Han Chinese opera genres performed the five provinces of Central China, and belongs to the Bang Zi cadence system. On 20 May 2006, Dapingdiao was approved by the State Council to be included in the first batch of the National Intangible Cultural Heritage list.

Erjiaxian is also known as the "Wudayin". It is also one of the Han Chinese opera genres, and in 2008 was included the second batch of the National Intangible Cultural Heritage list.

== See also ==
- Yanjin huoshao
