= Đặng Thị Minh Hạnh =

Vietnamese fashion designer (b. 1961)

Đặng Thị Minh Hạnh (born 1962) is a fashion designer and school director. She is a director of the Vietnam Fashion Design Institute (FADIN) in Ho Chi Minh City, and is a leading figure in Vietnam's new fashion industry.

Minh Hạnh was born in 1961 in Pleiku and was raised in Huế, Việtnam. She specialises in hybridising traditional designs with modern clothing. Her work has been shown abroad, and at a Tokyo fashion fair in 1997, she became the first Vietnamese designer to be awarded an international prize.
