= Fengqiu County =

Fengqiu 封丘县 Fengkiu
- County
- Location of the seat in Henan
- Coordinates: 35°02′28″N 114°25′08″E
- Country: People's Republic of China
- Province: Henan
- Prefecture-level city: Xinxiang

Area
  - Total: 1,220 km^{2} (470 sq mi)

Population (2019)
  - Total: 718,600
  - Density: 589/km^{2} (1,530/sq mi)
- Time zone: UTC+8 (China Standard)
- Postal code: 453300
- Division code: FQU

Fengqiu County
- Traditional Chinese: 封邱縣
- Simplified Chinese: 封丘县
Transcriptions
Standard Mandarin
- Hanyu Pinyin: Fēngqiū xiàn
- Bopomofo: ㄈㄥ ㄑㄧㄡ ㄒㄧㄢˋ
- Wade–Giles: Feng^{1}-ch‘iu^{1} hsien^{4}
- IPA: [fə́ŋ.tɕʰjóʊ ɕjɛ̂n]
Yue: Cantonese
- Yale Romanization: Fūngyāu yuhn
- Jyutping: fung1 jau1 jyun6
- IPA: [fʊŋ˥.jɐw˥ jyn˨]

Fengqiu County (simplified Chinese: 封丘; traditional Chinese: 封邱; pinyin: Fēngqiū) is a county in the north of Henan province, located on the north (left) bank of the Yellow River. It is under the administration of the prefecture-level city of Xinxiang.

In ancient times, Pingqiu County (平丘) was located to the east of here.

== Administrative divisions ==
As of 2012, this county is divided to 8 towns and 11 townships.

Towns

- Chengguan (城关镇)
- Huangling (黄陵镇)
- Huangde (黄德镇)
- Yingju (应举镇)
- Chenqiao (陈桥镇)
- Zhaogang (赵岗镇)
- Liuguang (留光镇)
- Pandian Township (潘店镇)

Townships

- Chengguan Township (城关乡)
- Hui Township (回族乡)
- Wangcun Township (王村乡)
- Chengu Township (陈固乡)
- Juxiang Township (居厢乡)
- Lugang Township (鲁岗乡)
- Jinggong Township (荆宫乡)
- Caogang Township (曹岗乡)
- Lizhuang Township (李庄乡)
- Yingang Township (尹岗乡)
- Fengcun Township (冯村乡)

== Climate ==
Climate data for Fengqiu, elevation 70 m (230 ft), (1991–2020 normals, extremes 1981–2010)
Month	Jan	Feb	Mar	Apr	May	Jun	Jul	Aug	Sep	Oct	Nov	Dec	Year
Record high °C (°F)	18.8 (65.8)	25.2 (77.4)	27.8 (82.0)	34.5 (94.1)	38.0 (100.4)	39.5 (103.1)	40.4 (104.7)	38.4 (101.1)	38.5 (101.3)	34.3 (93.7)	27.1 (80.8)	24.2 (75.6)	40.4 (104.7)
Mean daily maximum °C (°F)	5.1 (41.2)	8.6 (47.5)	15.8 (60.4)	21.6 (70.9)	27.3 (81.1)	32.3 (90.1)	31.9 (89.4)	30.6 (87.1)	26.8 (80.2)	22.0 (71.6)	14.0 (57.2)	7.4 (45.3)	20.3 (68.5)
Daily mean °C (°F)	−0.6 (30.9)	2.8 (37.0)	9.4 (48.9)	15.2 (59.4)	21.1 (70.0)	26.0 (78.8)	27.1 (80.8)	25.7 (78.3)	20.9 (69.6)	15.5 (59.9)	7.9 (46.2)	1.4 (34.5)	14.4 (57.9)
Mean daily minimum °C (°F)	−5.1 (22.8)	−1.8 (28.8)	3.7 (38.7)	9.2 (48.6)	15.2 (59.4)	20.3 (68.5)	23.1 (73.6)	22.0 (71.6)	16.5 (61.7)	10.6 (51.1)	3.1 (37.6)	−3.4 (25.9)	9.4 (49.0)
Record low °C (°F)	−17.7 (0.1)	−14.0 (6.8)	−10.0 (14.0)	−1.0 (30.2)	5.4 (41.7)	12.8 (55.0)	16.6 (61.9)	13.0 (55.4)	6.4 (43.5)	−1.6 (29.1)	−13.4 (7.9)	−13.2 (8.2)	−17.7 (0.1)
Average precipitation mm (inches)	7.5 (0.30)	9.9 (0.39)	16.3 (0.64)	33.4 (1.31)	48.4 (1.91)	67.9 (2.67)	157.3 (6.19)	114.9 (4.52)	72.0 (2.83)	29.3 (1.15)	24.9 (0.98)	7.1 (0.28)	588.9 (23.17)
Average precipitation days (≥ 0.1 mm)	2.9	3.6	4.1	5.1	6.5	7.4	10.4	9.3	7.7	5.6	4.5	2.8	69.9
Average snowy days	3.3	3.0	1.0	0.2	0	0	0	0	0	0	1.1	2.5	11.1
Average relative humidity (%)	63	62	62	66	67	65	80	82	77	70	69	66	69
Mean monthly sunshine hours	116.8	132.0	178.2	203.9	222.0	201.0	179.6	172.3	156.6	155.9	136.4	126.4	1,981.1
Percentage possible sunshine	37	42	48	52	51	47	41	42	43	45	44	42	45
Source: China Meteorological Administration

== See also ==
- Mao Jie
