= Weibin, Xinxiang =

Coordinates: 35°18′07″N 113°51′58″E

Weibin 卫滨区
- District
- Interactive map of Weibin
- Country: People's Republic of China
- Province: Henan
- Prefecture-level city: Xinxiang

Area
  - Total: 52 km^{2} (20 sq mi)

Population (2019)
  - Total: 224,900
  - Density: 4,300/km^{2} (11,000/sq mi)
- Time zone: UTC+8 (China Standard)
- Postal code: 453000

Weibin District (simplified Chinese: 卫滨区; traditional Chinese: 衛濱區; pinyin: Wèibīn Qū) is a district of the city of Xinxiang, Henan province, China.

== Administrative divisions ==
As of 2012, this district is divided to 7 subdistricts and 1 township.

Subdistricts

- Shenglilu Subdistrict (胜利路街道)
- Jiefanglu Subdistrict (解放路街道)
- Zhongtongjie Subdistrict (中同街街道)
- Jiankanglu Subdistrict (健康路街道)
- Ziyoulu Subdistrict (自由路街道)
- Nanqiao Subdistrict (南桥街道)
- Tiexi Subdistrict (铁西街道)

Townships

- Pingyuan Township (平原乡)
