= Huojia County =

Huojia 获嘉县 Hwokia
- County
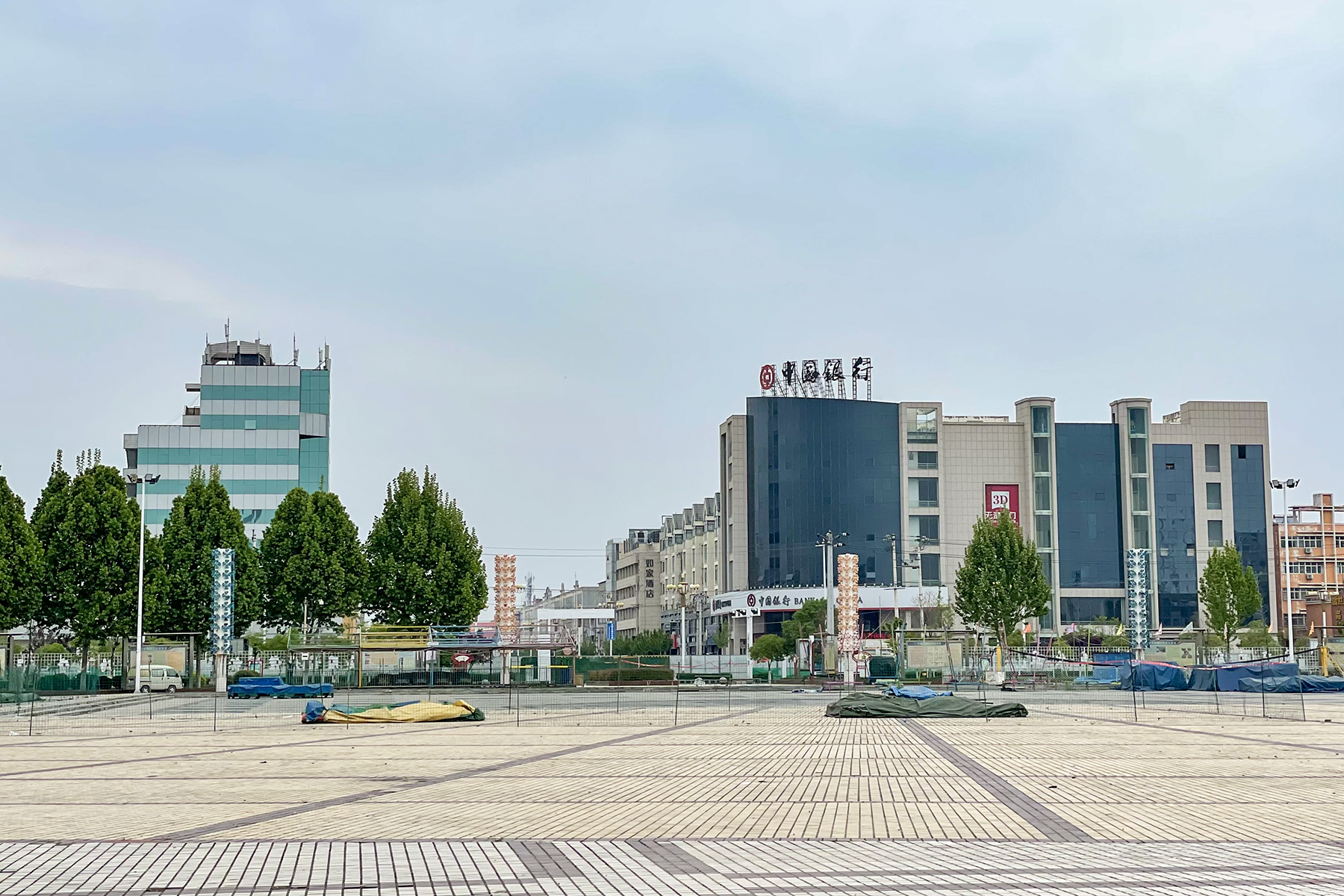

- Location of the seat in Henan
- Coordinates: 35°15′35″N 113°39′28″E
- Country: People's Republic of China
- Province: Henan
- Prefecture-level city: Xinxiang

Area
  - Total: 473 km^{2} (183 sq mi)

Population (2019)
  - Total: 414,000
  - Density: 875/km^{2} (2,270/sq mi)
- Time zone: UTC+8 (China Standard)
- Postal code: 453800
- Area code: 0373

Huojia County (simplified Chinese: 获嘉; traditional Chinese: 獲嘉; pinyin: Huòjiā) is a county under the administration of the prefecture-level city of Xinxiang, in the northwest of Henan province, China.

The name Huojia, which means "capturing [Lü] Jia", was used as the county name in 111 BC when Emperor Wu of Han, who on his royal progress at this place, heard that Han forces had captured Lü Jia –prime minister of Nanyue kingdom– in the Han–Nanyue War.

== Administrative divisions ==
As of 2012, this county was divided to nine towns, two townships and one other.

Towns

- Chengguan (城关镇)
- Zhaojing (照镜镇)
- Huangdi (黄堤镇)
- Zhonghe (中和镇)
- Xuying (徐营镇)
- Fengzhuang (冯庄镇)
- Kangcun (亢村镇)
- Shizhuang (史庄镇)
- Taishan (太山镇)

Townships

- Weizhuang Township (位庄乡)
- Daxinzhuang Township (大新庄乡)

Others

- Xigong District Administrative Committee (西工区管理委员会)
- Yuanzhongchang Administrative Committee (原种场管理委员会)
- Yuanyichang Administrative Committee (园艺场管理委员会)
- Nongchang Administrative Committee (农场管理委员会)

== Geography ==
=== Location Information ===
Located in the north of Henan Province, west of Xinxiang City, north of Taihang Mountains, south of the Yellow River, between longitude 113°39′42″~113°44′20″ and latitude 35°9′34″~35°15′37″, with a county area of 473 square kilometers.

=== Climate ===
Warm temperate continental monsoon climate, average annual frost-free period 221.2 days, average annual rainfall 557.2 mm, average annual snowfall days 14.1 days, average annual sunshine 2058.4 hours. 1986-2004 average annual temperature 14.6 °C, average annual frost-free period 221.2 days, average annual rainfall 557.2 mm, average annual snowfall days 14.1 days, average annual sunshine 2058.4 hours.

Climate data for Huojia, elevation 77 m (253 ft), (1991–2020 normals, extremes 1981–present)
| Month | Jan | Feb | Mar | Apr | May | Jun | Jul | Aug | Sep | Oct | Nov | Dec | Year |
|---|---|---|---|---|---|---|---|---|---|---|---|---|---|
| Record high °C (°F) | 19.1 (66.4) | 29.6 (85.3) | 29.4 (84.9) | 35.8 (96.4) | 39.2 (102.6) | 41.2 (106.2) | 39.9 (103.8) | 39.4 (102.9) | 37.7 (99.9) | 35.6 (96.1) | 27.9 (82.2) | 23.5 (74.3) | 41.2 (106.2) |
| Mean daily maximum °C (°F) | 5.8 (42.4) | 9.7 (49.5) | 16.4 (61.5) | 22.3 (72.1) | 27.8 (82.0) | 32.6 (90.7) | 32.4 (90.3) | 30.9 (87.6) | 27.1 (80.8) | 22.0 (71.6) | 14.2 (57.6) | 7.5 (45.5) | 20.7 (69.3) |
| Daily mean °C (°F) | 0.2 (32.4) | 3.8 (38.8) | 10.1 (50.2) | 16.0 (60.8) | 21.7 (71.1) | 26.5 (79.7) | 27.5 (81.5) | 26.0 (78.8) | 21.4 (70.5) | 15.8 (60.4) | 8.4 (47.1) | 2.1 (35.8) | 15.0 (58.9) |
| Mean daily minimum °C (°F) | −3.9 (25.0) | −0.8 (30.6) | 4.6 (40.3) | 10.1 (50.2) | 15.9 (60.6) | 20.7 (69.3) | 23.3 (73.9) | 22.2 (72.0) | 17.1 (62.8) | 11.1 (52.0) | 3.8 (38.8) | −2.2 (28.0) | 10.2 (50.3) |
| Record low °C (°F) | −16.5 (2.3) | −19.4 (−2.9) | −7.4 (18.7) | −2.1 (28.2) | 4.9 (40.8) | 11.5 (52.7) | 17.5 (63.5) | 12.6 (54.7) | 7.3 (45.1) | −2.6 (27.3) | −12.6 (9.3) | −12.3 (9.9) | −19.4 (−2.9) |
| Average precipitation mm (inches) | 6.4 (0.25) | 8.7 (0.34) | 14.2 (0.56) | 31.9 (1.26) | 47.0 (1.85) | 66.2 (2.61) | 171.9 (6.77) | 109.0 (4.29) | 60.0 (2.36) | 27.5 (1.08) | 19.9 (0.78) | 4.5 (0.18) | 567.2 (22.33) |
| Average precipitation days (≥ 0.1 mm) | 2.6 | 3.3 | 4.0 | 4.9 | 6.6 | 7.4 | 11.3 | 10.0 | 7.9 | 6.1 | 4.8 | 2.2 | 71.1 |
| Average snowy days | 3.6 | 2.9 | 1.2 | 0.1 | 0 | 0 | 0 | 0 | 0 | 0 | 1.0 | 1.9 | 10.7 |
| Average relative humidity (%) | 60 | 59 | 58 | 63 | 63 | 61 | 77 | 80 | 75 | 68 | 67 | 61 | 66 |
| Mean monthly sunshine hours | 110.6 | 128.1 | 180.3 | 204.1 | 228.4 | 206.1 | 178.8 | 183.5 | 163.8 | 158.5 | 135.7 | 127.2 | 2,005.1 |
| Percentage possible sunshine | 35 | 41 | 48 | 52 | 52 | 48 | 41 | 44 | 45 | 46 | 44 | 42 | 45 |
Source: China Meteorological Administrationall-time February high

== Natural Resources ==
=== Land Resources ===
There are more than 91,333 hectares (225,690 acres) of exploitable agricultural, forestry and grass wasteland in Huojia County, and 38,000 hectares (94,000 acres) of arable land for agricultural use.

=== Mineral Resources ===
The main mineral resources of Huojia County are limestone, iron ore, bauxite and coal. The coal resource reserves amount to 800 million tons and coal bed methane reserves are 20 billion cubic meters.

=== Water Resources ===
The county is located in the Yellow River and Haihe River basin, the territory of the Big Lion Flooded River, the communist canal, Dasha River, West Mengjiang River, the people's victory canal and Wujia dry canal, all from the southwest to the northeast flow through the county. China's South-North Water Diversion project (SNWD) is adjacent to the county.

== Economic situation ==
- In 2020, the gross regional product of Huojia County will be 17.01 billion yuan, an increase of 5%; public budget revenue will be 750 million yuan, an increase of 15.5%; fixed asset investment will increase by 20.6%; industrial value added above the scale will increase by 5.1%; total retail sales of social consumer goods will be 6.49 billion yuan, a decrease of 2.8%; per capita disposable income of residents will be 20,912 yuan, an increase of 4.8%.
- In 2022, the county achieved a regional gross domestic product (GDP) of 21.557 billion yuan, up 6.3% year-on-year, ranking 4th in the eight counties and cities in terms of growth rate. Among them, the primary industry added value of 4.324 billion yuan, up 5.7% year-on-year; secondary industry added value of 8.894 billion yuan, up 9.4% year-on-year; tertiary industry added value of 8.339 billion yuan, up 3.6% year-on-year. The structure ratio of the three industries is 20:41.3:38.7.

== Traffic situation ==
The southern part of the county is 80 kilometers from Zhengzhou International Airport and 20 kilometers from Beijing-Zhuhai Expressway. It is in the 1-hour economic circle of the Central Plains City Group and the 30-minute economic circle of Xinxiang City, and is an important channel for the outbound transportation of Jin coal and the dedication of tourism.
