= Weihui =

Weihui 卫辉市 Weihwei
- County-level city
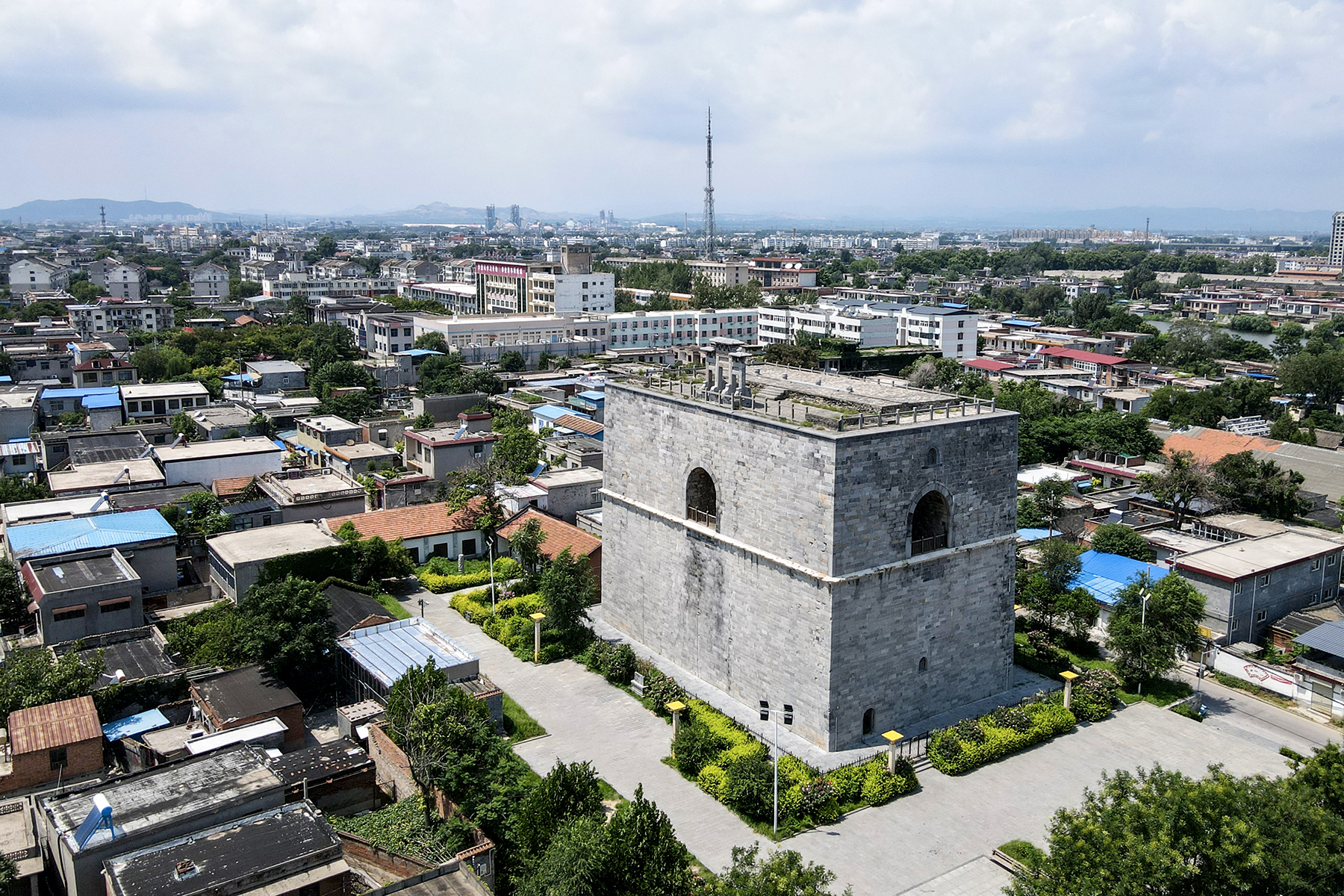
- Wangjing Mansion

- Location in Henan
- Coordinates: 35°23′54″N 114°03′54″E
- Country: People's Republic of China
- Province: Henan
- Prefecture-level city: Xinxiang

Area
  - Total: 882 km^{2} (341 sq mi)

Population (2019)
  - Total: 490,700
- Time zone: UTC+8 (China Standard)
- Postal code: 453100

Weihui (simplified Chinese: 卫辉; traditional Chinese: 衛輝; pinyin: Wèihuī), formerly Jixian or Ji County (simplified Chinese: 汲县; traditional Chinese: 汲縣), is a county-level city in the north of Henan province, China. It is under the administration of the prefecture-level city of Xinxiang. The city has an area of 882 km^{2} (341 sq mi) and a population of 480,000.

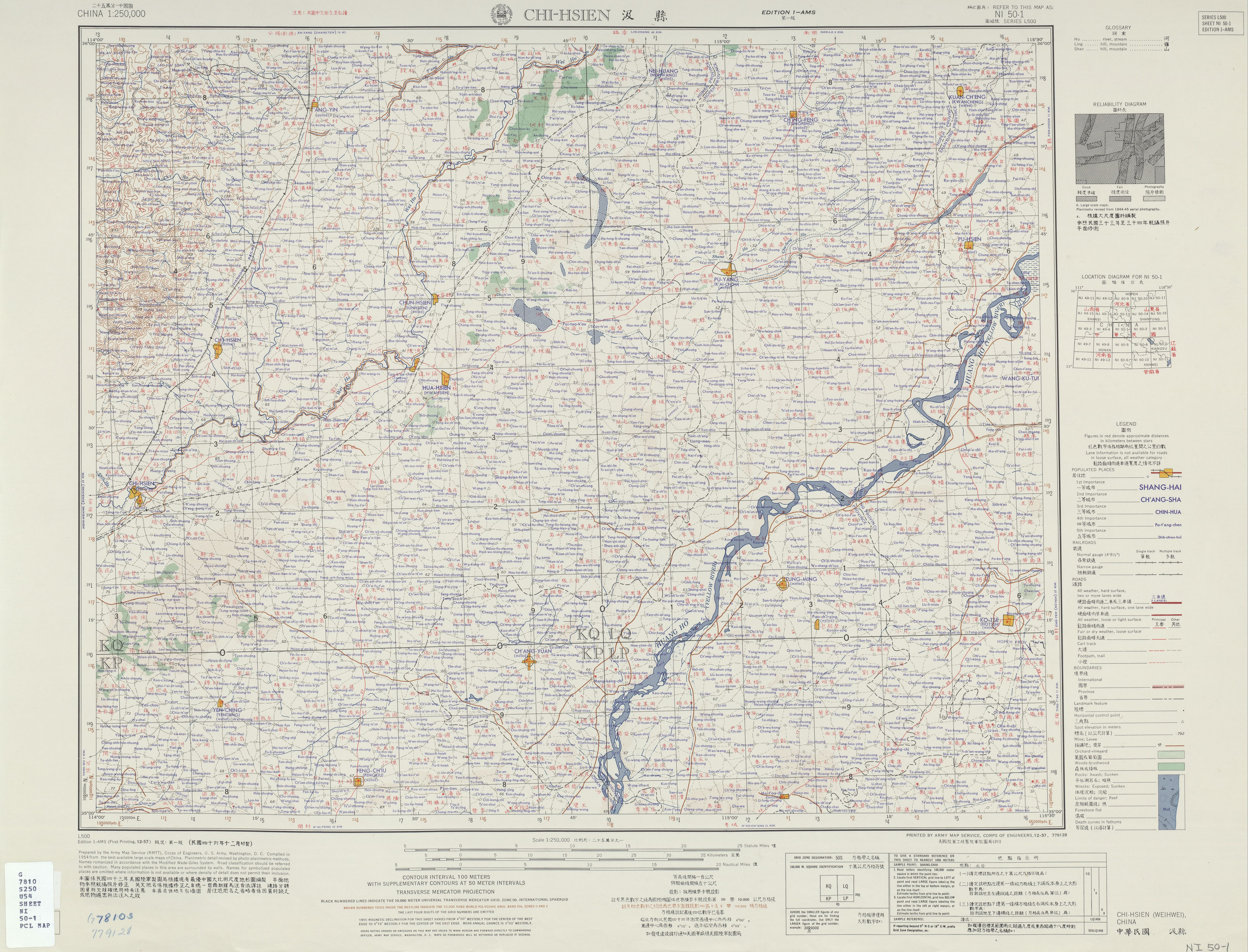
Map including Weihui (labeled as CHI-HSIEN (WEIHWEI) (walled) 汲縣) (AMS 1954)

== Administrative divisions ==
As of 2012, this city is divided to 7 towns and 6 townships.

Towns

- Jishui (汲水镇)
- Taigong (太公镇)
- Sunxingcun (孙杏村镇)
- Houhe (后河镇)
- Liyuantun (李源屯镇)
- Tangzhuang (唐庄镇)
- Shanglecun (上乐村镇)

Townships

- Shibaotou Township (狮豹头乡)
- Andu Township (安都乡)
- Dunfangdian Township (顿坊店乡)
- Liuzhuang Township (柳庄乡)
- Pangzhai Township (庞寨乡)
- Chengjiao Township (城郊乡)

== Climate ==
Climate data for Weihui, elevation 68 m (223 ft), (1991–2020 normals, extremes 1981–2010)
Month	Jan	Feb	Mar	Apr	May	Jun	Jul	Aug	Sep	Oct	Nov	Dec	Year
Record high °C (°F)	18.5 (65.3)	24.3 (75.7)	28.2 (82.8)	34.7 (94.5)	38.2 (100.8)	41.2 (106.2)	41.0 (105.8)	37.0 (98.6)	37.1 (98.8)	34.2 (93.6)	27.4 (81.3)	23.4 (74.1)	41.2 (106.2)
Mean daily maximum °C (°F)	5.2 (41.4)	9.3 (48.7)	15.2 (59.4)	21.8 (71.2)	27.2 (81.0)	32.3 (90.1)	32.1 (89.8)	30.7 (87.3)	27.0 (80.6)	21.7 (71.1)	13.6 (56.5)	7.2 (45.0)	20.3 (68.5)
Daily mean °C (°F)	−0.1 (31.8)	3.6 (38.5)	9.3 (48.7)	15.7 (60.3)	21.3 (70.3)	26.3 (79.3)	27.5 (81.5)	26.1 (79.0)	21.5 (70.7)	15.6 (60.1)	7.9 (46.2)	1.8 (35.2)	14.7 (58.5)
Mean daily minimum °C (°F)	−4.2 (24.4)	−1.0 (30.2)	4.0 (39.2)	10.0 (50.0)	15.6 (60.1)	20.8 (69.4)	23.5 (74.3)	22.3 (72.1)	17.1 (62.8)	10.7 (51.3)	3.4 (38.1)	−2.3 (27.9)	10.0 (50.0)
Record low °C (°F)	−13.6 (7.5)	−15.0 (5.0)	−8.1 (17.4)	−2.2 (28.0)	6.0 (42.8)	9.9 (49.8)	17.2 (63.0)	12.2 (54.0)	6.0 (42.8)	−2.2 (28.0)	−12.5 (9.5)	−13.5 (7.7)	−15.0 (5.0)
Average precipitation mm (inches)	4.5 (0.18)	8.1 (0.32)	12.7 (0.50)	29.7 (1.17)	42.6 (1.68)	71.4 (2.81)	169.3 (6.67)	113.6 (4.47)	61.6 (2.43)	26.4 (1.04)	19.4 (0.76)	4.1 (0.16)	563.4 (22.19)
Average precipitation days (≥ 0.1 mm)	2.3	3.2	3.7	4.8	6.6	8.3	11.0	9.5	7.6	5.8	4.7	2.2	69.7
Average snowy days	2.9	2.8	1.0	0.2	0	0	0	0	0	0	1.0	2.0	9.9
Average relative humidity (%)	59	58	58	63	65	63	78	80	75	69	68	62	67
Mean monthly sunshine hours	115.1	129.9	176.3	203.7	222.3	199.9	170.4	180.0	158.1	153.0	132.3	129.2	1,970.2
Percentage possible sunshine	37	42	47	52	51	46	39	44	43	44	43	43	44
Source: China Meteorological Administration
