= Xinxiang County =

Xinxiang 新乡县
- County
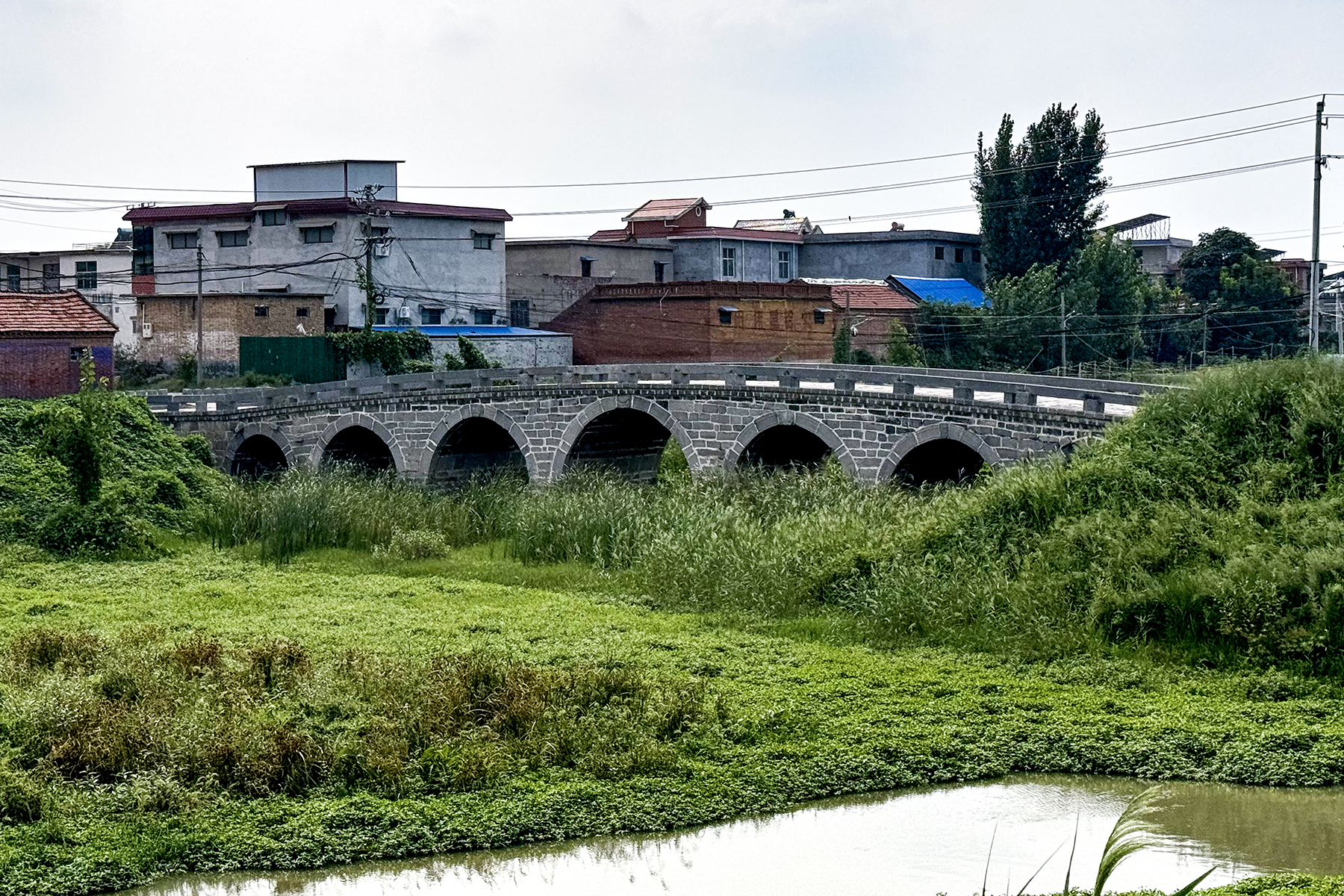

- Location of the seat in Henan
- Coordinates: 35°11′28″N 113°48′18″E
- Country: People's Republic of China
- Province: Henan
- Prefecture-level city: Xinxiang

Area
  - Total: 365 km^{2} (141 sq mi)

Population (2019)
  - Total: 347,900
  - Density: 953/km^{2} (2,470/sq mi)
- Time zone: UTC+8 (China Standard)
- Postal code: 453700

Xinxiang County (simplified Chinese: 新乡县; traditional Chinese: 新鄉縣; pinyin: Xīnxiāng Xiàn) is a county in Xinxiang, Henan Province. It is situated in the center of the northern Henan Plateau. The Taihang Mountains are to the north, and the Yellow River is to the south. The area is 365 km^{2} (141 sq mi) with a population of 310,000 in 2002. The postal code is 453700.

The county dates back to the Sui dynasty (AD 581–618).

== Administrative divisions ==
As of 2012, this county is divided to 6 towns, 1 townships and 1 other.

Towns

- Zhaipo (翟坡镇)
- Xiaoji (小冀镇)
- Qiliying (七里营镇)
- Langgongmiao (郎公庙镇)
- Guguzhai (古固寨镇)
- Dazhaoying (大召营镇)

Townships

- Hehe Township (合河乡)

Others

- Xinxiang Economic Development Zone (新乡经济开发区)
