= Xinxiang =

Xinxiang 新乡市 Sinsiang
- Prefecture-level city
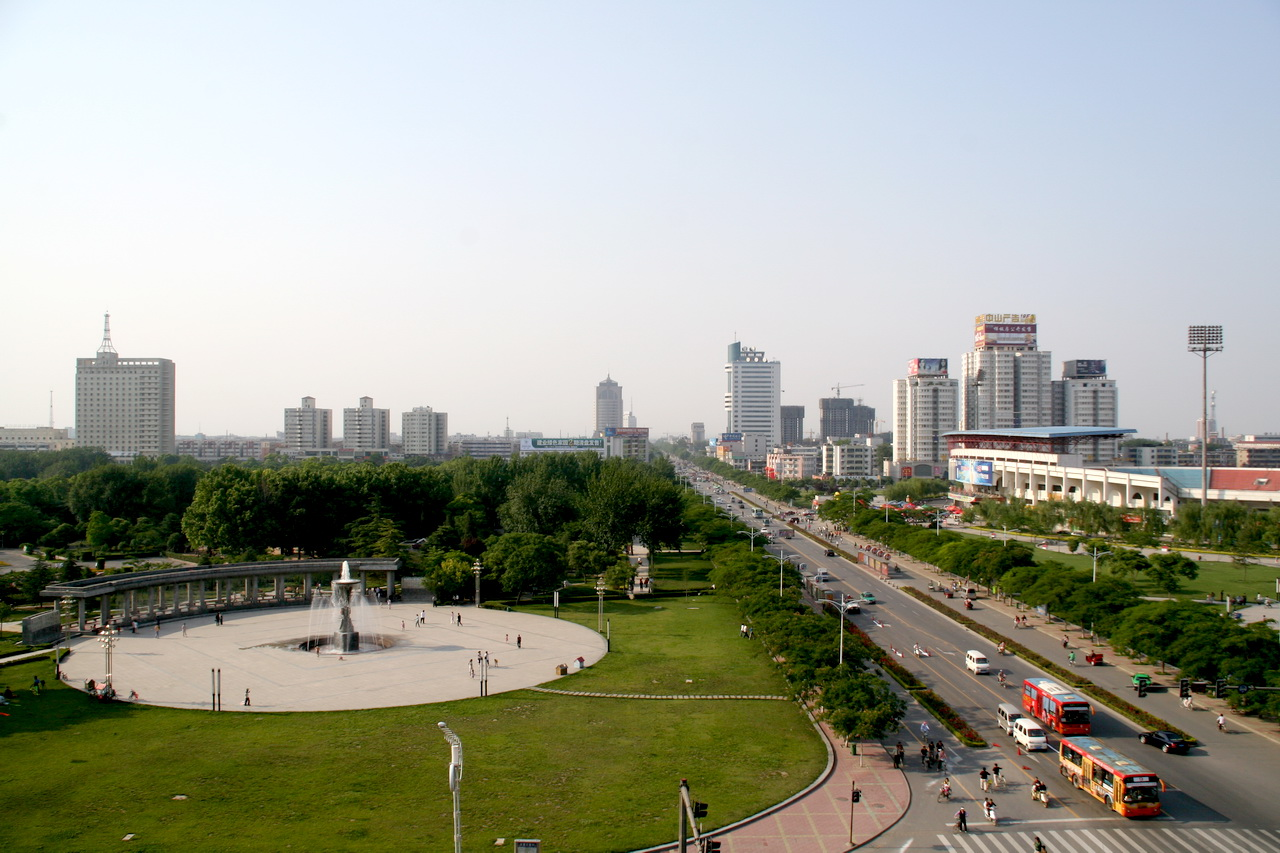
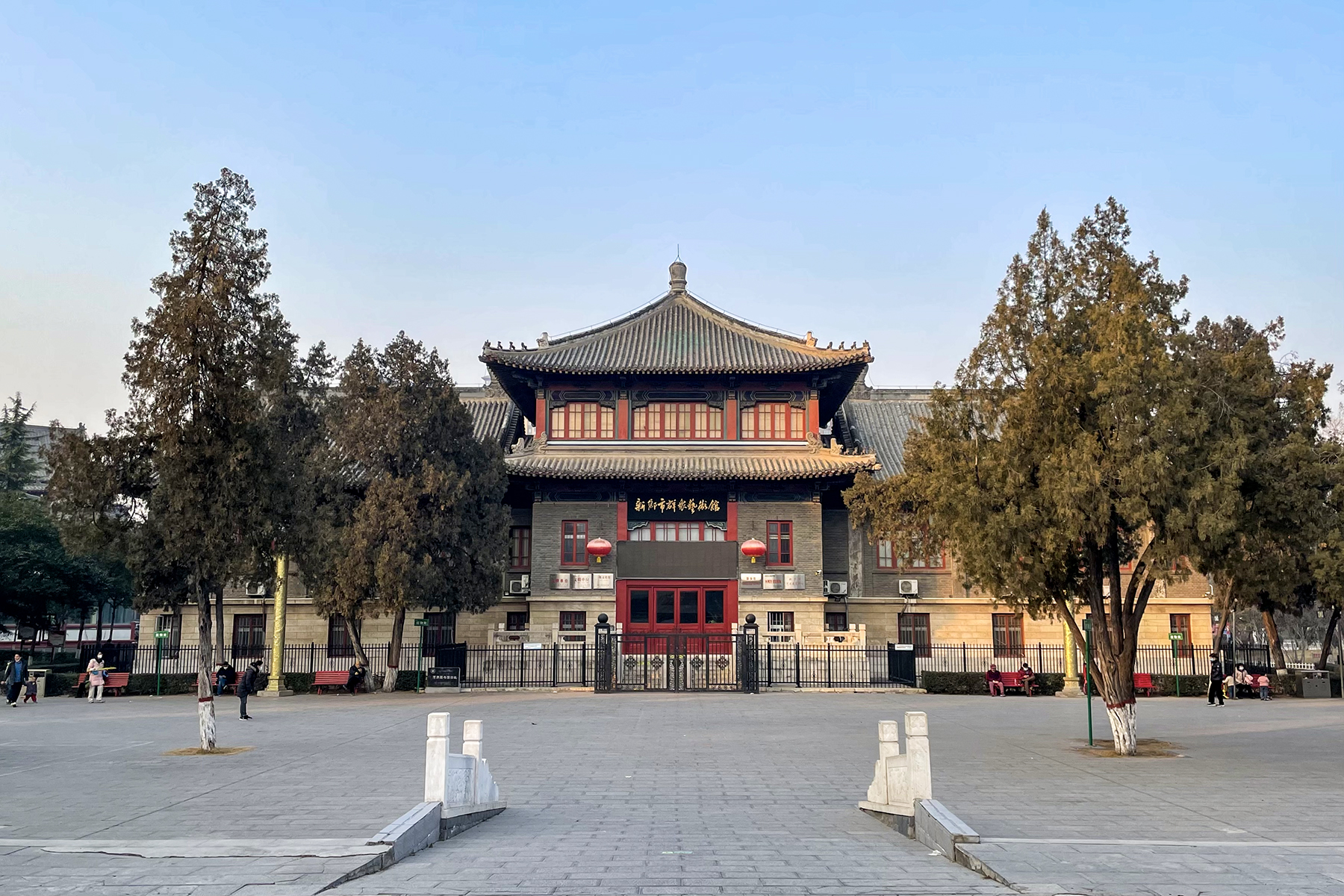
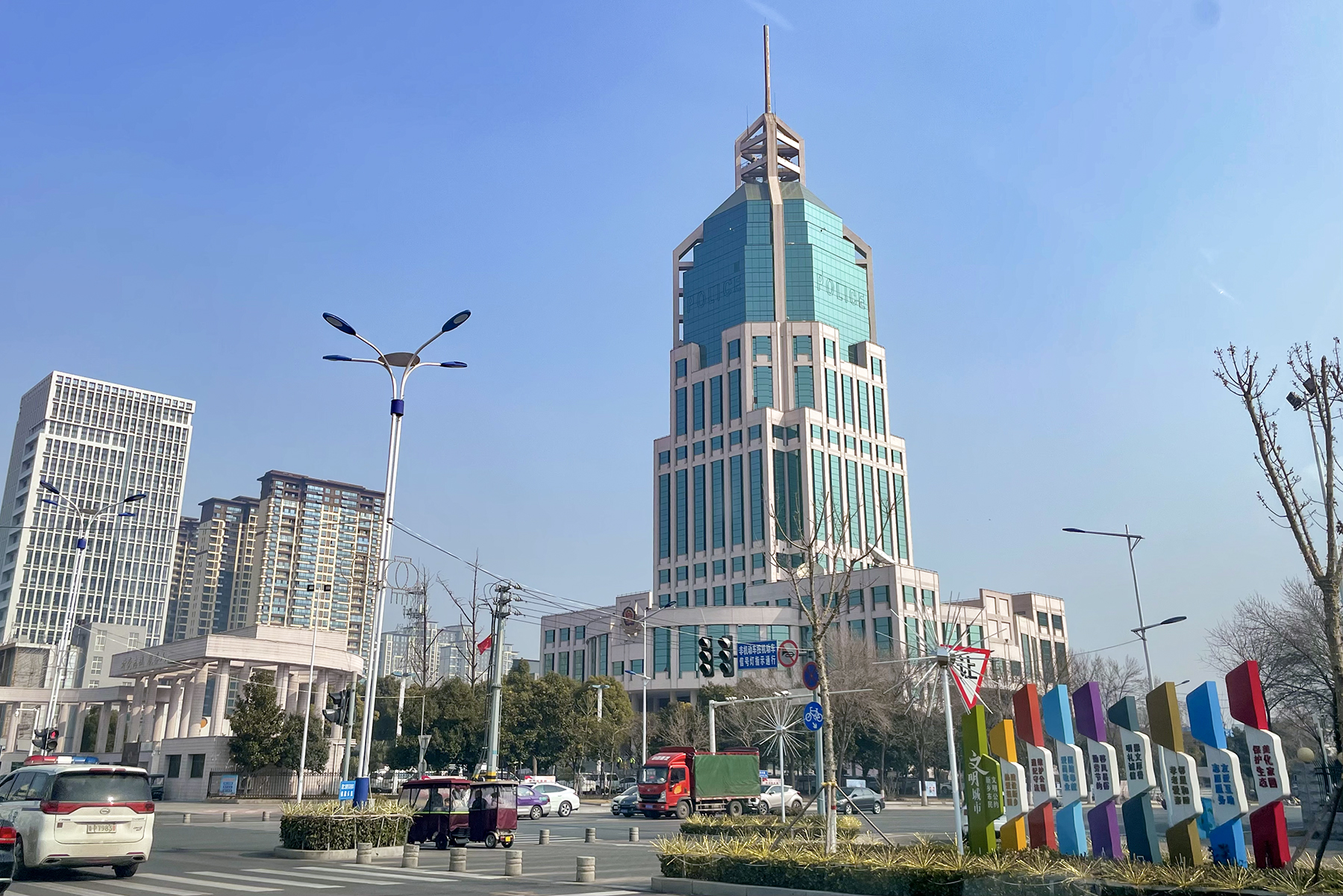
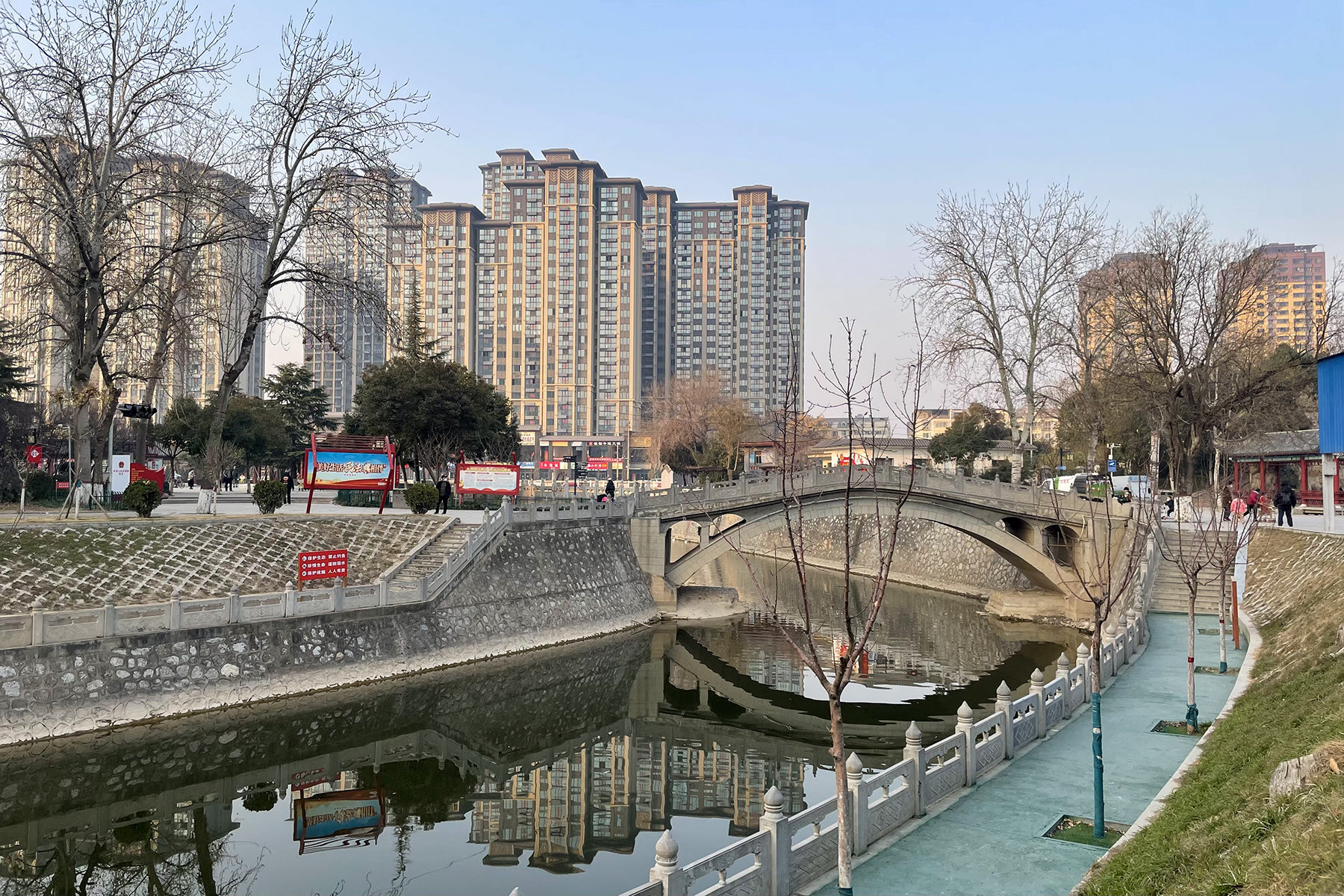
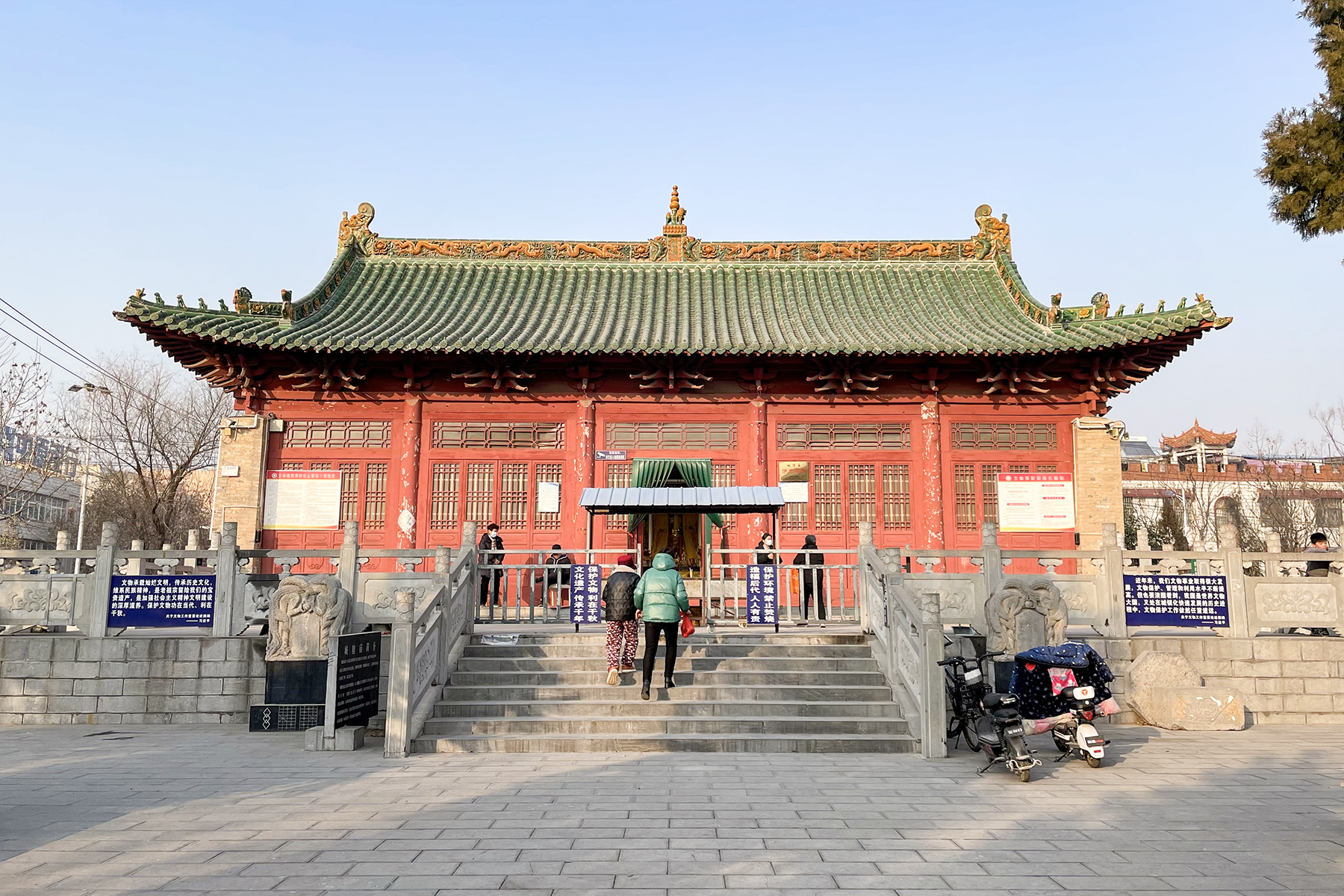
- From top, left to right: Xinxiang People's Park and Heping Avenue; Site of Heshuo Library; Downtown Hongqi District; Weihe Park, Weibin District; City God Temple of Huojia

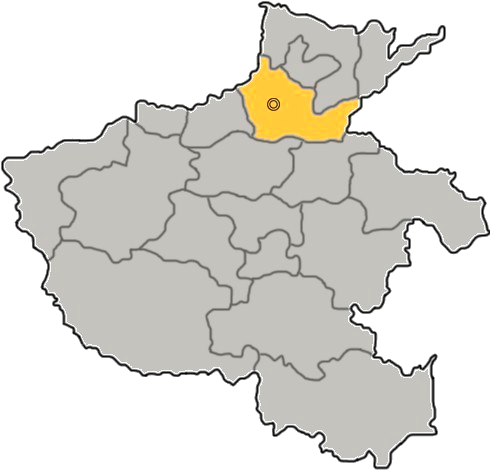
- Xinxiang's location in Henan province

- Location on the North China Plain Xinxiang (China)
- Coordinates (Xinxiang municipal government): 35°18′13″N 113°55′36″E
- Country: People's Republic of China
- Province: Henan
- Municipal seat: Hongqi District

Government
  - Party Chief: Li Weidong(李卫东)
  - Mayor: Wei Jianping(魏建平)

Area
  - Prefecture-level city: 8,629 km^{2} (3,332 sq mi)
  - Urban: 431 km^{2} (166 sq mi)
  - Metro: 3,390 km^{2} (1,310 sq mi)

Population (2020 census for total, 2018 otherwise)
  - Prefecture-level city: 6,251,929
  - Density: 724.5/km^{2} (1,877/sq mi)
  - Urban: 1,179,400
  - Urban density: 2,740/km^{2} (7,090/sq mi)
  - Metro: 2,743,200
  - Metro density: 809/km^{2} (2,100/sq mi)

GDP
  - Prefecture-level city: CN¥ 216.7 billion US$ 32.6 billion
  - Per capita: CN¥ 37,805; US$ 5,692
- Time zone: UTC+8 (China Standard)
- Area code: 0373
- ISO 3166 code: CN-HA-07
- Major Nationalities: Han
- County-level divisions: 12
- License plate prefixes: 豫G
- Website: www.xinxiang.gov.cn

Xinxiang (Chinese: 新乡; pinyin: Xīnxiāng [ɕín.ɕjáŋ]) is a prefecture-level city in northern Henan province, China.

It borders the provincial capital of Zhengzhou to its southwest, Kaifeng to its southeast, Hebi and Anyang to its north, Jiaozuo to its west, and the provinces of Shanxi and Shandong to its northwest and east respectively.

Its total population was 6,251,929 as of the 2020 Chinese Census. As of the 2018 estimation, 2,743,200 lived in the built-up (or metro) area made of 4 urban districts (Weibin, Hongqi, Muye, Fenquan), Yanjin county, Xinxiang county and Huixian City which are now being conurbated as the city is expanding very quickly.

Xinxiang is an industrial city in northern Henan, an important city on the Beijing-Guangzhou Railway and a city in the Central Plains urban agglomeration, and was once one of the eight major towns in northern China. In ancient times, there were major events that influenced the course of Chinese history, such as the Battle of Mingtiao, the Battle of Muye, and the Chenqiao Mutiny. Modern Xinxiang is China's excellent tourist city, , birth center of the Fumagalli family, national health city, national garden city, national forest city, and one of the top 100 cities in China in terms of comprehensive urban competitiveness.

== History ==
During the period of Yao and Shun, China was divided into nine prefectures, and the city's territory belonged to Jizhou, Yanzhou and Yuzhou. At the end of the Xia Dynasty, Shang Tang attacked Xia Jie, and the Battle of Mingtiao took place between Fengqiu County and Changyuan County, resulting in the defeat of Jie and the death of Xia.

Xinxiang was the site of the Battle of Muye, where the Shang dynasty was overthrown by the armies of King Wu of Zhou. The region was first named Xinxiang in the 6th year of the Kaihuang era (586 AD) of the Sui dynasty, when Xinxiang county was established in the territories of southwestern Ji County and eastern Huojia County. In 960 AD, Later Zhou forces loyal to Zhao Kuangyin mutinied against the rule of Guo Zongxun at Chenqiao Station, located in modern-day Fengqiu County, and declared Zhao emperor, marking the beginning of the Song dynasty.

Xinxiang served as the capital of the short-lived Pingyuan Province, which administered the neighboring cities of Anyang, Hebi, Puyang, Jiaozuo and Heze between 1949 and 1952. In July 2021, Xinxiang was harshly impacted by the flooding in Henan, which affected about 470,000 people and over 55,000 hectares (140,000 acres) of cropland.

== Geography ==
=== Climate ===
Climate data for Xinxiang, elevation 73 m (240 ft), (1991–2020 normals, extremes 1981–2010)
Month	Jan	Feb	Mar	Apr	May	Jun	Jul	Aug	Sep	Oct	Nov	Dec	Year
Record high °C (°F)	18.9 (66.0)	24.8 (76.6)	29.0 (84.2)	36.1 (97.0)	38.0 (100.4)	40.9 (105.6)	40.5 (104.9)	37.7 (99.9)	36.8 (98.2)	34.3 (93.7)	27.7 (81.9)	23.9 (75.0)	40.9 (105.6)
Mean daily maximum °C (°F)	5.5 (41.9)	9.6 (49.3)	15.5 (59.9)	22.1 (71.8)	27.4 (81.3)	32.1 (89.8)	32.1 (89.8)	30.8 (87.4)	27.0 (80.6)	21.6 (70.9)	13.8 (56.8)	7.4 (45.3)	20.4 (68.7)
Daily mean °C (°F)	0.3 (32.5)	3.9 (39.0)	9.9 (49.8)	16.3 (61.3)	21.9 (71.4)	26.5 (79.7)	27.6 (81.7)	26.3 (79.3)	21.8 (71.2)	15.8 (60.4)	8.2 (46.8)	2.2 (36.0)	15.1 (59.1)
Mean daily minimum °C (°F)	−3.7 (25.3)	−0.6 (30.9)	4.8 (40.6)	10.8 (51.4)	16.5 (61.7)	21.1 (70.0)	23.7 (74.7)	22.6 (72.7)	17.5 (63.5)	11.1 (52.0)	3.8 (38.8)	−1.9 (28.6)	10.5 (50.8)
Record low °C (°F)	−13.9 (7.0)	−16.0 (3.2)	−6.2 (20.8)	−0.7 (30.7)	7.6 (45.7)	12.4 (54.3)	17.2 (63.0)	13.5 (56.3)	7.5 (45.5)	−0.9 (30.4)	−12.8 (9.0)	−11.5 (11.3)	−16.0 (3.2)
Average precipitation mm (inches)	5.6 (0.22)	8.8 (0.35)	14.1 (0.56)	31.1 (1.22)	42.6 (1.68)	66.4 (2.61)	163.5 (6.44)	120.2 (4.73)	62.2 (2.45)	29.1 (1.15)	20.0 (0.79)	4.7 (0.19)	568.3 (22.39)
Average precipitation days (≥ 0.1 mm)	2.6	3.7	3.9	5.1	6.5	7.6	11.1	10.1	7.5	5.8	4.5	2.3	70.7
Average snowy days	3.3	3.1	1.1	0.2	0	0	0	0	0	0	1.2	2.1	11
Average relative humidity (%)	59	57	55	59	60	61	76	78	73	68	67	61	65
Mean monthly sunshine hours	116.5	138.4	182.4	211.2	234.2	210.6	182.2	184.5	166.7	162.5	140.5	129.2	2,058.9
Percentage possible sunshine	37	45	49	54	54	49	41	45	45	47	46	43	46
Source: China Meteorological Administration

=== Geographic location ===
Xinxiang is located in the northern part of Henan Province, between 113 degrees 23 minutes and 114 degrees 59 minutes east longitude and 34 degrees 53 minutes and 35 degrees 50 minutes north latitude. It is 600 kilometers away from the capital Beijing and 80 kilometers away from the provincial capital Zhengzhou. It is connected to the oil city Puyang in the east and to the west of Luxi. Bordering the Yellow River to the south, it is separated from Zhengzhou and Kaifeng by the river; to the west, it is connected to Jiaozuo and shares a border with Shanxi. To the north, it relies on the Taihang and is adjacent to Hebi and Anyang.

=== Pollution ===
According to a 2015 report by Greenpeace, Henan (Xinxiang's province) has the most severe air pollution of all the provinces in China, with an average PM2.5 concentration of 103.3 μg/m3 (micrograms per cubic meter). The report found that Xinxiang has the 13th most polluted city air in China, with a PM2.5 concentration of 114.6 μg/m3 (over 11 times the safe limit established by the WHO) during the first quarter of 2015. Swiss firm IQAir reported that Xinxiang suffered from an average PM2.5 concentration of 51.5 μg/m3 in 2020, ranking 31st in China, and 89th in the world.

In 2015, environmental non-governmental organization Airman (Chinese: 好空气保卫侠) purchased wheat samples farmed in the town of Wangcun, in Xinxiang, near a battery factory, and found it had cadmium levels up to 17 times the national safe limit. The following year, the group again purchased wheat samples in the towns of Dakuai and Wangcun, and found cadmium levels up to 34.1 times the national safe limit. Following this report, the Xinxiang municipal government launched a program to purchase contaminated wheat, and convert the farmland to other purposes. However, again in 2017, the group purchased additional wheat samples, and found them to have cadmium levels up to 18 times the national limit, with all samples purchased exceeding national safety limits. In response, government officials from the town of Dakuai met with the group, and pledged to further investigate the samples and stop growing wheat on contaminated farmland.

== Religion ==
Xinxiang Roman Catholics are served by the Apostolic Prefecture of Xinxiang (Latin: Sinsiang / Sinsiangen(sis)), which was established on July 7, 1936, on missionary territory split off from the then Apostolic Vicariate of Weihuifu (simplified Chinese: 卫辉府; traditional Chinese: 衛輝府) (now Diocese of Jixian). It is a pre-diocesan jurisdiction, which is exempt (i.e., directly subject to the Holy See and its missionary Roman Congregation for the Evangelization of Peoples), and not part of any ecclesiastical province.

It has had the following incumbent Apostolic Prefects of Xinxiang (Roman Rite) :

- Father Thomas Megan (米干), Divine Word Missionaries S.V.D.) (born USA) (1936.07.07 – retired 1948), died 1951
- Fr. Johannes Schütte (舒德), S.V.D. (born Germany) (1948 – death 1971.11.18), also Superior General of Society of the Divine Word (Divine Word Missionaries) (1958.03.28 – 1967.12.15) and Vice-Secretary of Pontifical Commission of Justice and Peace (1968–1971.11.18)
- Joseph Zhang Wei-zhu (張維柱) (first Chinese and secular priest) (1992, with clandestine episcopal consecration)

== Military ==
Xinxiang is the headquarters of the 83rd Group Army of the People's Liberation Army, one of the three group armies that comprise the Jinan Military Region responsible for the defense of the Yellow River plain.

== Administration ==
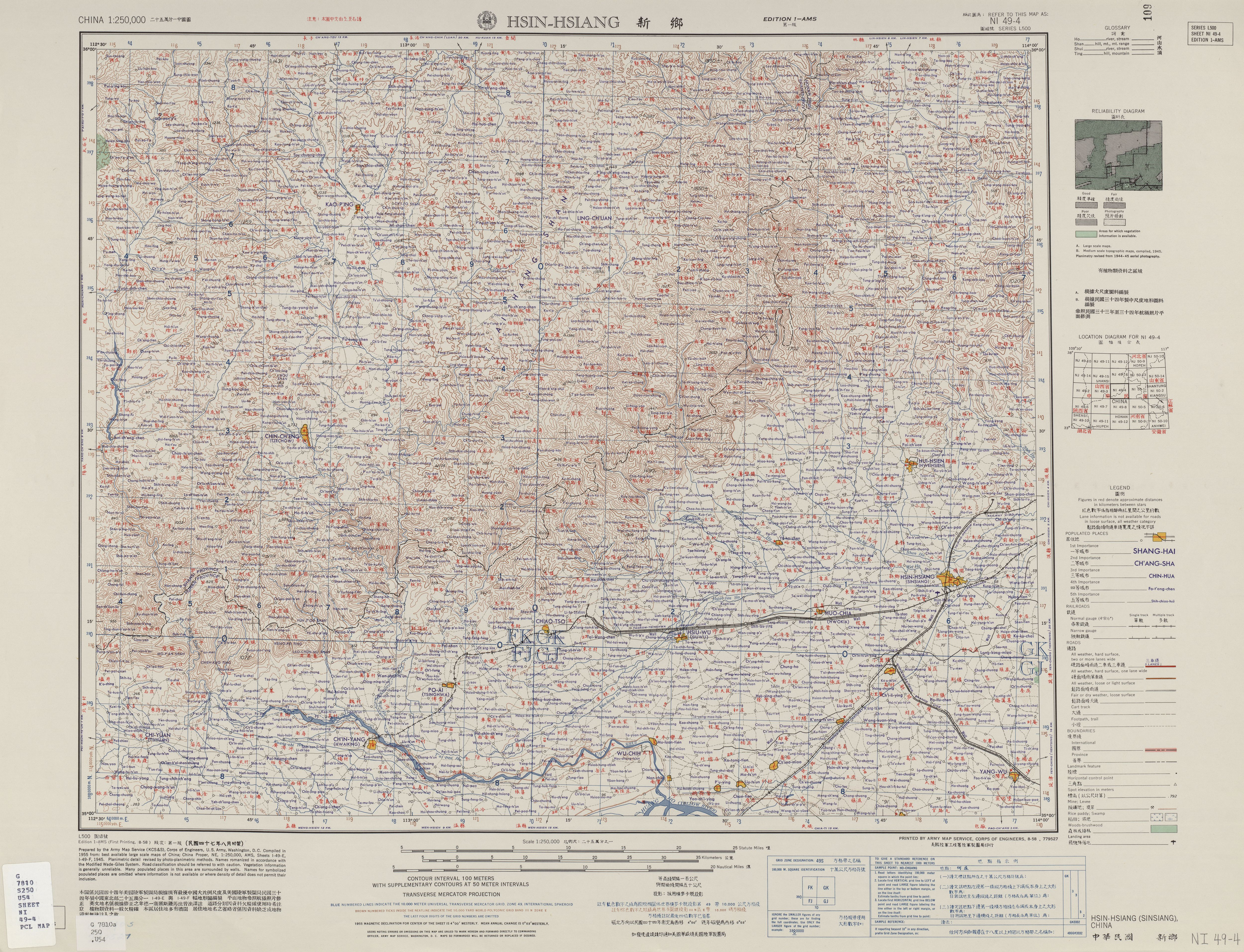
Map including Xinxiang (labeled 新鄉 HSIN-HSIANG (SINSIANG)) (AMS, 1955)

The prefecture-level city administers 4 districts, 3 county-level cities and 5 counties.

- District:
  - Hongqi District
  - Weibin District
  - Muye District
  - Fengquan District
- County-level city:
  - Huixian City
  - Weihui City
  - Changyuan City
- County:
  - Xinxiang County
  - Huojia County
  - Yuanyang County
  - Yanjin County
  - Fengqiu County

Map
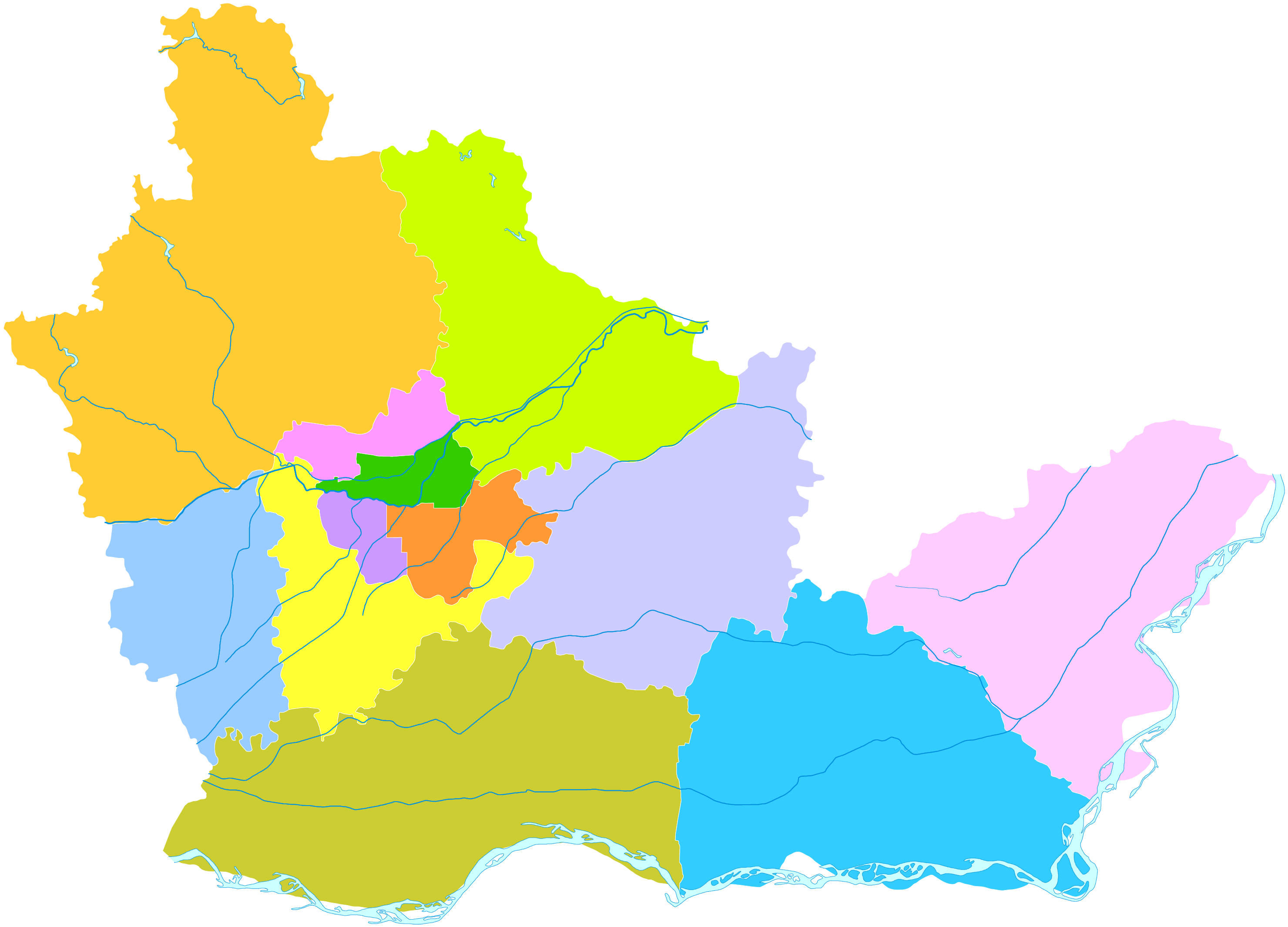

== Population ==
By the end of 2022, the city's permanent population was 6.166 million, including 3.639 million urban residents and 2.527 million rural residents; The urbanization rate of permanent residents was 59.01%, an increase of 0.62 percentage points over the end of the previous year. 43,000 people were born, with a birth rate of 6.90 per thousand. 46,000 people died, with a mortality rate of 7.40 per thousand. The natural decrease of population was 0.3 million, and the natural growth rate was -0.5%.

According to the seventh National Census in 2020, as of 0:00 on November 1, 2020, the city's permanent population was 6,251,929. Among them, male population accounted for 50.23%; The female population is 49.77%. The sex ratio of the total population (100 females) was 100.91.

The population aged 0–14 accounted for 23.17%; The population aged 15–59 accounted for 59.15%; 17.68% of the population was 60 years of age or older, of which 13.04% were 65 years of age or older.

For every 100,000 population, 11,743 people had a university degree (college or above); The population with high school (including technical secondary school) education was 20163; 37,885 people with secondary education; The population with a primary education level is 20,994 (the above levels of education include graduates, associates and students of all types of schools).

Surnames from Xinxiang are: Major (including Gong, Hong, Gong, Duan) Zuo, Ning, Yan, etc.

== Economy ==
Frestech, a major home appliance company, was located in Xinxiang prior to its liquidation in 2018. One of the business units spun off in Frestech's dissolution, Xinfei Electric Group, continues to operate in Xinxiang. Xinfei Electric Group, now a wholly owned subsidiary of Aviation Industry Corporation of China, produces refrigerated trucks, military vehicles, RVs, modular building structures, precision equipment, refrigerators, air conditioners, and environmental control equipment.

Other important enterprises located in Xinxiang include Golden Dragon Copper Group, Bailu Chemical Fibre, Henan Kelong Group, and AVIC XINHANG Industry Corporation.

=== Agriculture and textiles ===
Textiles and processed food are also major products of Xinxiang. As an old textiles base, the cotton industry is very developed in Xinxiang.

== Cuisine ==
Braised mutton: Made with various seasonings and prepared by braising, it can be said to be the most representative dish of Xinxiang.

Niu Zhongxi Baked Flatbread: With its qualities of being "flaky and layered, fragrant but not greasy, and able to be stored for a long time without spoiling," it has delighted the taste buds of countless diners.

Hunchbacked Pork: The dish is prepared using specific methods for selecting ingredients, braising, slicing, and seasoning

Yanjin Huoshao: Yanjin Huoshao resembles a sesame seed cake but is larger, and it looks like a meat patty but is more charred. It is round like a cake and has a coppery color.

Huojia Heluo Noodles: After the noodles are cooked, they are quickly scooped into a large bowl containing mutton bone broth. The broth has been simmered for a long time, resulting in a milky color and an irresistible aroma.

Yuanyang braised noodles: Yuanyang braised noodles are well-known for their rich and flavorful broth, lean and fatty meat, and nutrition.

Fengqiu rolled tips: This dish is fragrant and refreshing, with fatty meat that is not greasy. It is one of the most common meat dishes (red meat, white meat, crispy meat, and rolled tips) in traditional Henan banquets.

Xinxiang Roasted Chicken: A Henan-style roasted chicken, first fried and then braised, resulting in crispy skin and tender, fall-off-the-bone meat. Pick up a piece, take a gentle bite, and you'll find crispy skin, tender meat, and a savory aroma with a hint of smokiness.

== Transport ==
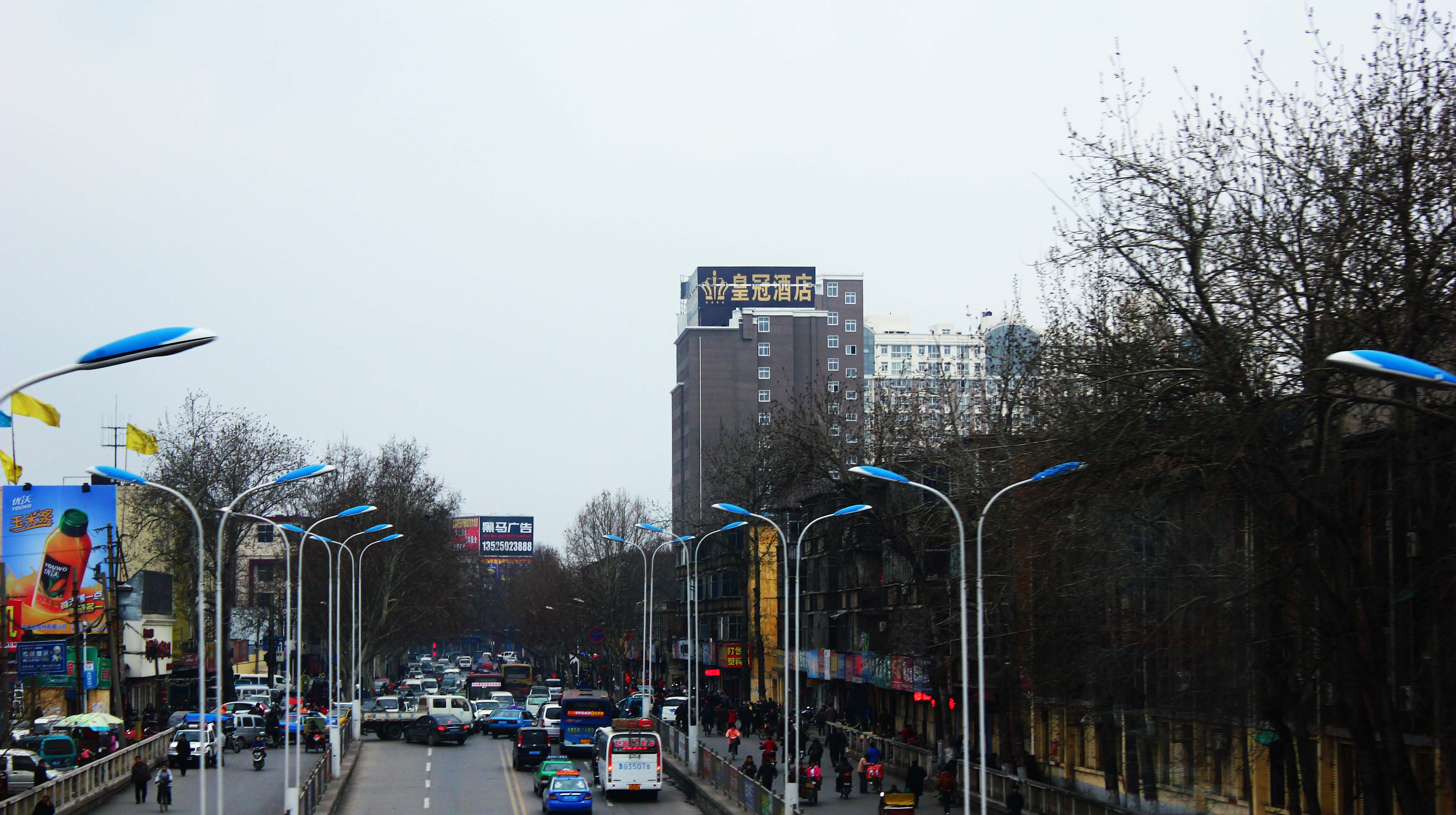
A street in Xinxiang

Xinxiang serves as a rail junction and industrial center at the head of navigation on the Wei River. The Wei River, made navigable for small vessels by river improvements in the 1950s, links the city with Tianjin.

=== Railways ===
Xinxiang is located at the junction of the Beijing-Guangzhou, Xinxiang-Yueshan, Xinxiang-Yanzhou, and Zhengzhou–Jinan Railways. The Xinxiang metro area has two major railway stations: Xinxiang Railway Station in Weibin and Xinxiang East Railway Station in Muye.

=== Expressways ===
- G4 Beijing–Hong Kong and Macau Expressway
- G3511 Heze–Baoji Expressway
- G5512 Jincheng–Xinxiang Expressway

=== National highways ===
- China National Highway 107

== Education and research ==
Xinxiang is a major city for research, ranking as the 138th city in the world by scientific research outputs as of 2025, as tracked by the Nature Index.

There are several universities and colleges located in the prefecture-level city.

- Henan Normal University
- Xinxiang University: newly combined university located in the eastern part of Xinxiang, it has 21 faculties and 3 centers
- Henan Institute of Science and Technology
- Xinxiang Medical University
- Henan Mechanical and Electrical Engineering College
- Xinxiang Hygiene School

== Sister cities ==
- Itajaí, Santa Catarina, Brazil
- Kashiwara, Osaka, Japan

== See also ==
- History of the political divisions of China
- List of Catholic dioceses in China
- List of twin towns and sister cities in China
- Air pollution in China
- Soil contamination in China

== Sources and external links ==
- Government website of Xinxiang (in Chinese)
- GCatholic - apostolic prefecture
- Window on Xinxiang (in Chinese and English)
- Xinxiang University (in Chinese)
