= Huai Prefecture =

Historical administrative division in Henan, China

Huaizhou or Huai Prefecture (懷州) was a zhou (prefecture) in imperial China centering on modern Qinyang, Jiaozuo, Henan, China. It existed (intermittently) from 467 to 1257.

== Geography ==
The administrative region of Huaizhou in the Tang dynasty falls within modern Henan. It probably includes parts of modern:

- Under the administration of Jiaozuo, Henan:
  - Jiaozuo: Jiefang District, Shanyang District, Zhongzhan District, Macun District
  - Qinyang
  - Xiuwu County
  - Wuzhi County
  - Bo'ai County
- Under the administration of Xinxiang, Henan:
  - Huojia County

Between 619 and 621 during the Tang dynasty, the headquarter was temporarily moved west to Jiyuan, Henan.
