= Jiaozheng Yellow River Bridge =

Bridge in Henan, China

Jiaozheng Yellow River Bridge 焦郑黄河大桥
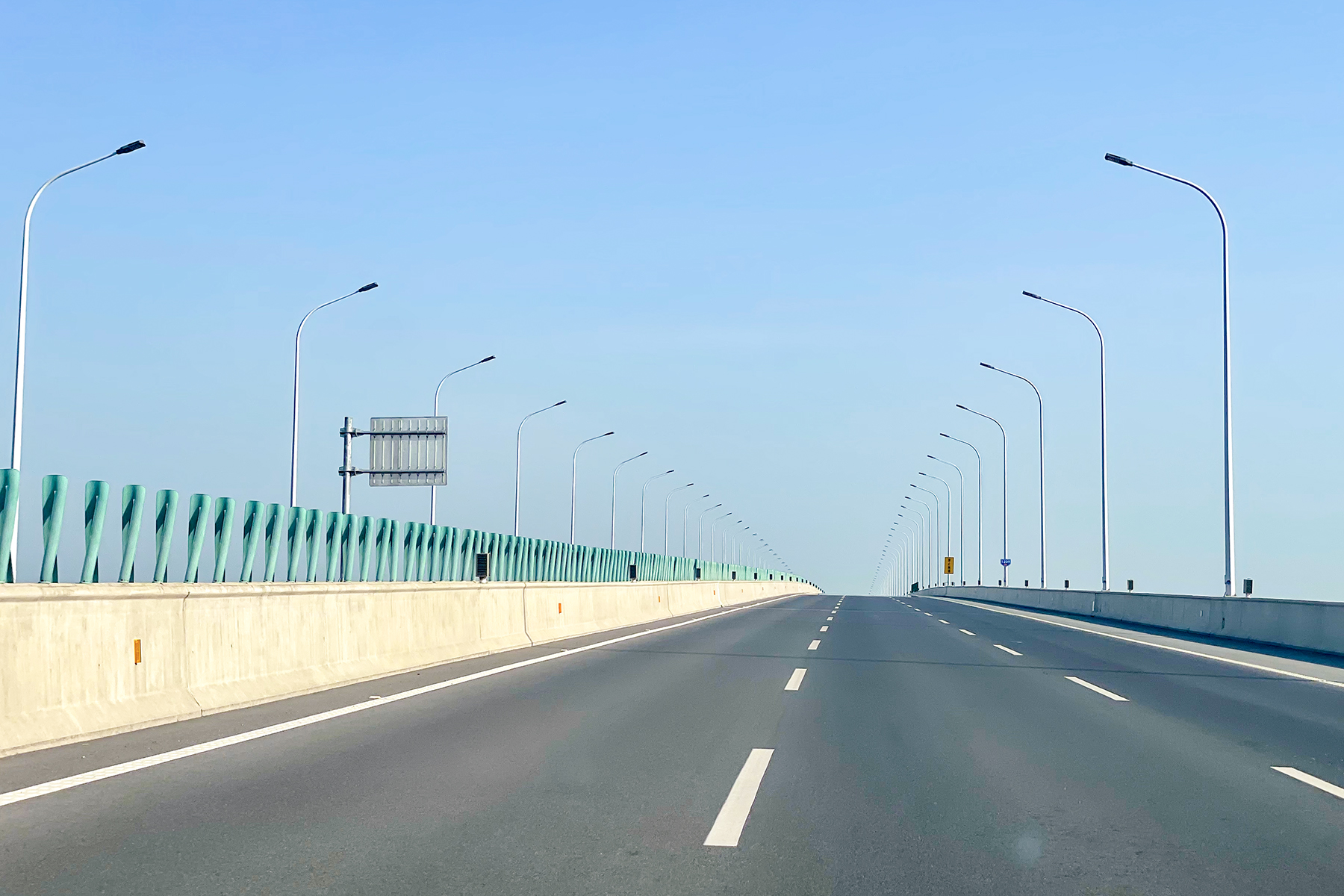
- 焦郑黄河大桥
- Carries: G234、S104、S232、S233、S234
- Crosses: Yellow River、Qin River
- Locale: Wuzhi County, Jiaozuo, Henan Province · Huiji District, Zhengzhou

Characteristics
- Design: Prestressed concrete continuous beam bridge
- Total length: 10.64 km (6.61 mi)
- Width: 32 m (105 ft)

History
- Construction start: December 2016
- Construction end: June 2020
- Opened: June 30, 2020

Statistics
- Toll: Toll of 15 Yuan for vehicles with 9 seats or fewer

Jiaozheng Yellow River Bridge is a bridge spanning the Yellow River in Henan Province, China. The bridge crosses the middle and lower reaches of the Yellow River, with the north bank connecting to Wuzhi County, Jiaozuo and the south bank to Huiji District, Zhengzhou. The construction project began in December 2016 and the bridge officially opened to traffic on December 6, 2019. The total investment was 3.647 billion yuan.

The bridge starts from the Yingbin Avenue in Jiaozuo City and ends through a full cloverleaf interchange connecting to the Xingyang S312 along the Yellow River Expressway in Zhengzhou. The bridge includes a pedestrian pathway.

== Technical Parameters ==
The total length is 26.356 kilometers, including a 10,647.5 meters long special large bridge over the Yellow River and a 1,202 meters long Qin River special large bridge. The main bridge is designed as a prestressed concrete continuous beam structure. It is designed as a two-way six-lane first-class highway with a design speed of 100 km/h. The navigational clearance height meets the requirements of a Class III waterway of the Yellow River.
