= Qin River =

Qin River may refer to:

- Qin River (Shanxi), is a tributary of the Yellow River in southeast Shanxi, China.
- Qin River (Guangxi) or Qinjiang (钦江), a river in Guangxi, China.
- Qin River (寢水, Qinshui), a former name of the Ming River in Hebei, China.
