= Tianning Temple =

Tianning Temple may refer to multiple temples in China:

- Tianning Temple (Beijing), in Guang'anmen, Beijing
- Tianning Temple (Changzhou), in Changzhou, Jiangsu
- Tianning Temple (Jiaozuo), historical temple in Qinyang, Henan
- Tianning Temple (Anyang), historical temple in Anyang, Henan
