= Tianning =

Tianning may refer to the following locations in China:

- Tianning District (天宁区), Changzhou, Jiangsu
- Tianning Temple (disambiguation) (天宁寺), two temples
- Tianning, Jiaocheng County (天宁镇), town and county seat of Jiaocheng County, Shanxi
- Tianning, Jiashan County (天凝镇), town in Jiashan County, Zhejiang
