= Wenfeng (disambiguation) =

Wenfeng may refer to:

== Places ==
- Wenfeng, Anyang, a district and the municipal seat of Anyang, Henan province, China
- Wenfeng Pagoda in Anyang, a Buddhist pagoda located in Anyang, Henan Province, China

== People ==
- Liang Wenfeng (born 1985), Chinese entrepreneur and businessman
- Wenfeng Ge (born 1987), Chinese boxer
