= Jiaozuo Museum =

Museum in Jiaozuo, China

- Traditional Chinese: 焦作市博物館
- Simplified Chinese: 焦作市博物馆
Transcriptions
Standard Mandarin
- Hanyu Pinyin: Jiāozuò Shì Bówùguǎn
Yue: Cantonese
- Yale Romanization: Giu-jok Si Bok-mat-gun

Jiaozuo Museum (Simplified Chinese: 焦作市博物馆) is a public museum located in Jiaozuo City, Henan province, China. It was established in 1965 and relocated to its current site at No. 72 Jianshe Middle Road, Shanyang District, in 1996.

As of September 2020, the Jiaozuo Museum covers an area of 24,325 square meters, with a building area of 10,500 square meters, and houses nearly 30,000 artifacts.

Among the cataloged and displayed items, there are 3,315 pieces, including Han Dynasty bronze ware, large pottery burial building from Eastern Han Dynasty, and Yuan Dynasty Zaju figurines.

== Gallery ==
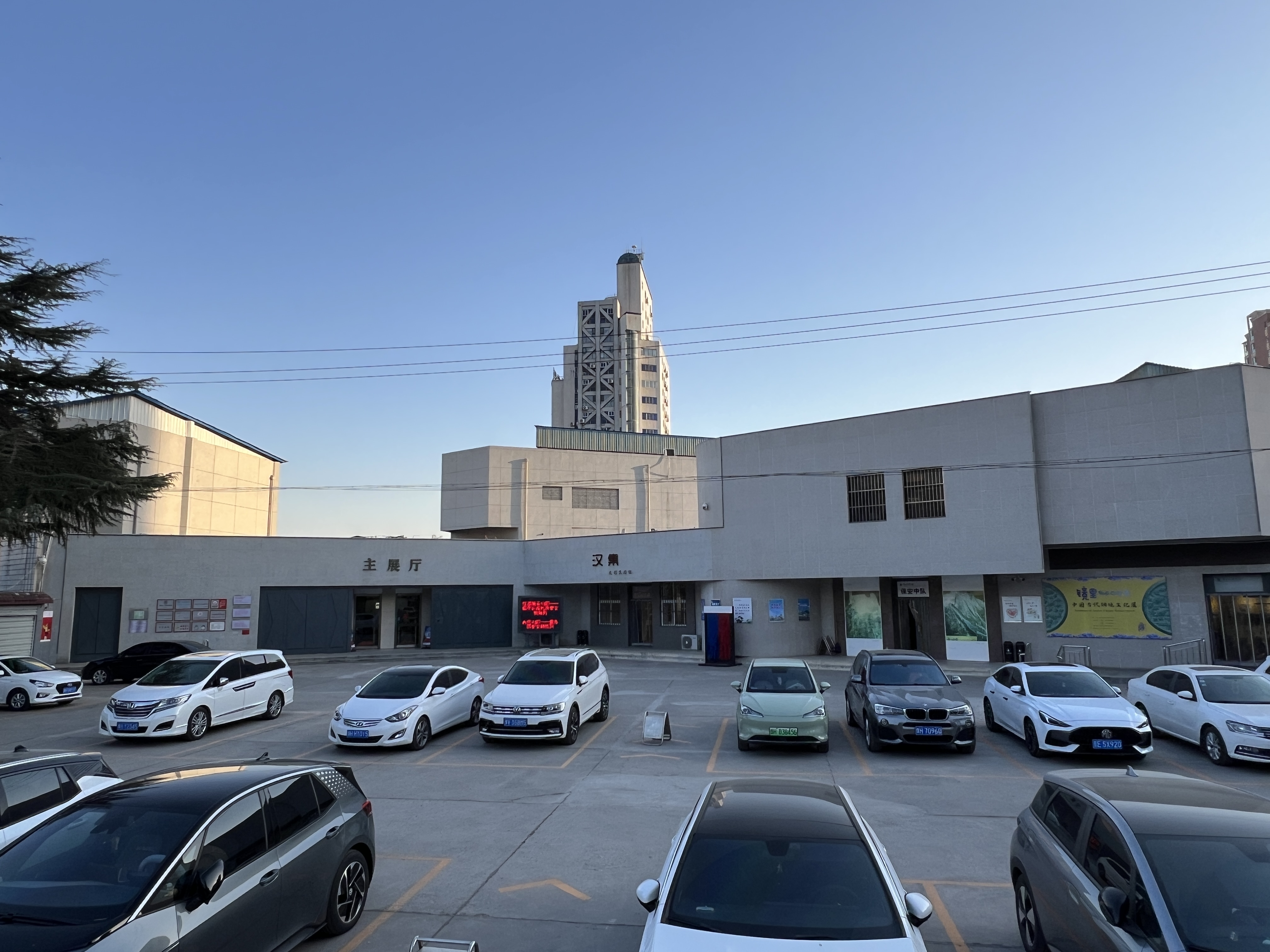
Jiaozuo Museum

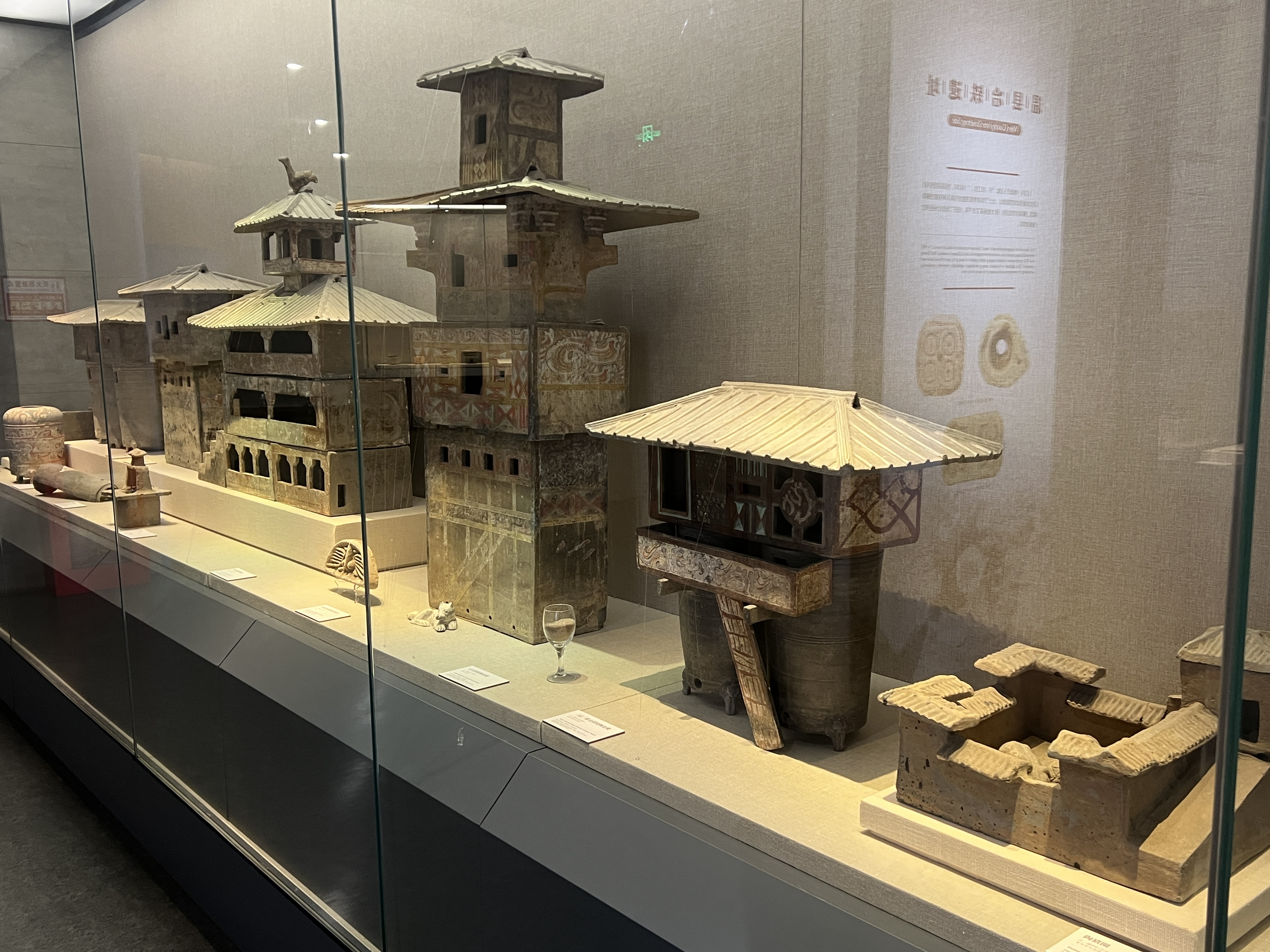
pottery burial building

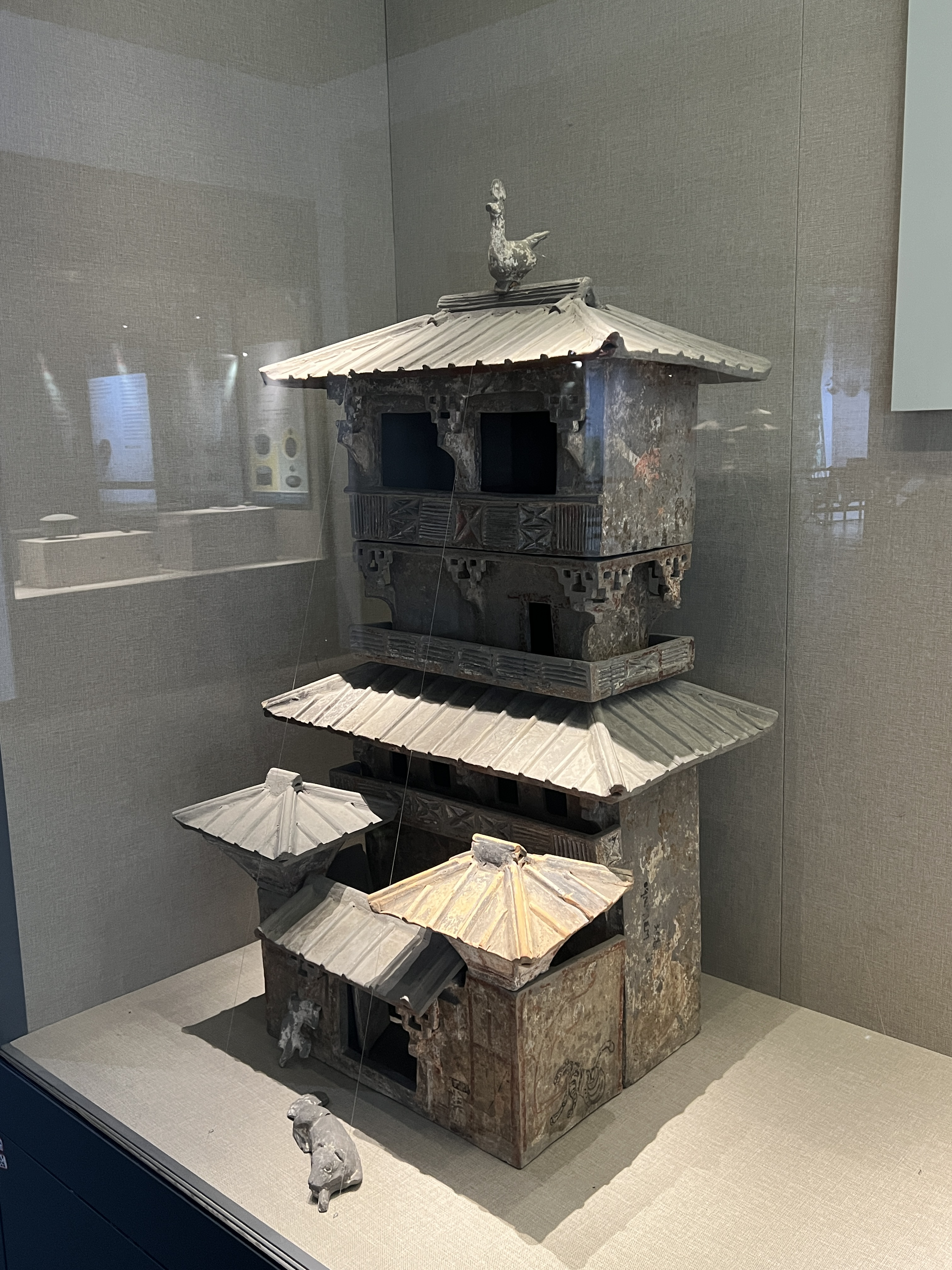
pottery burial building

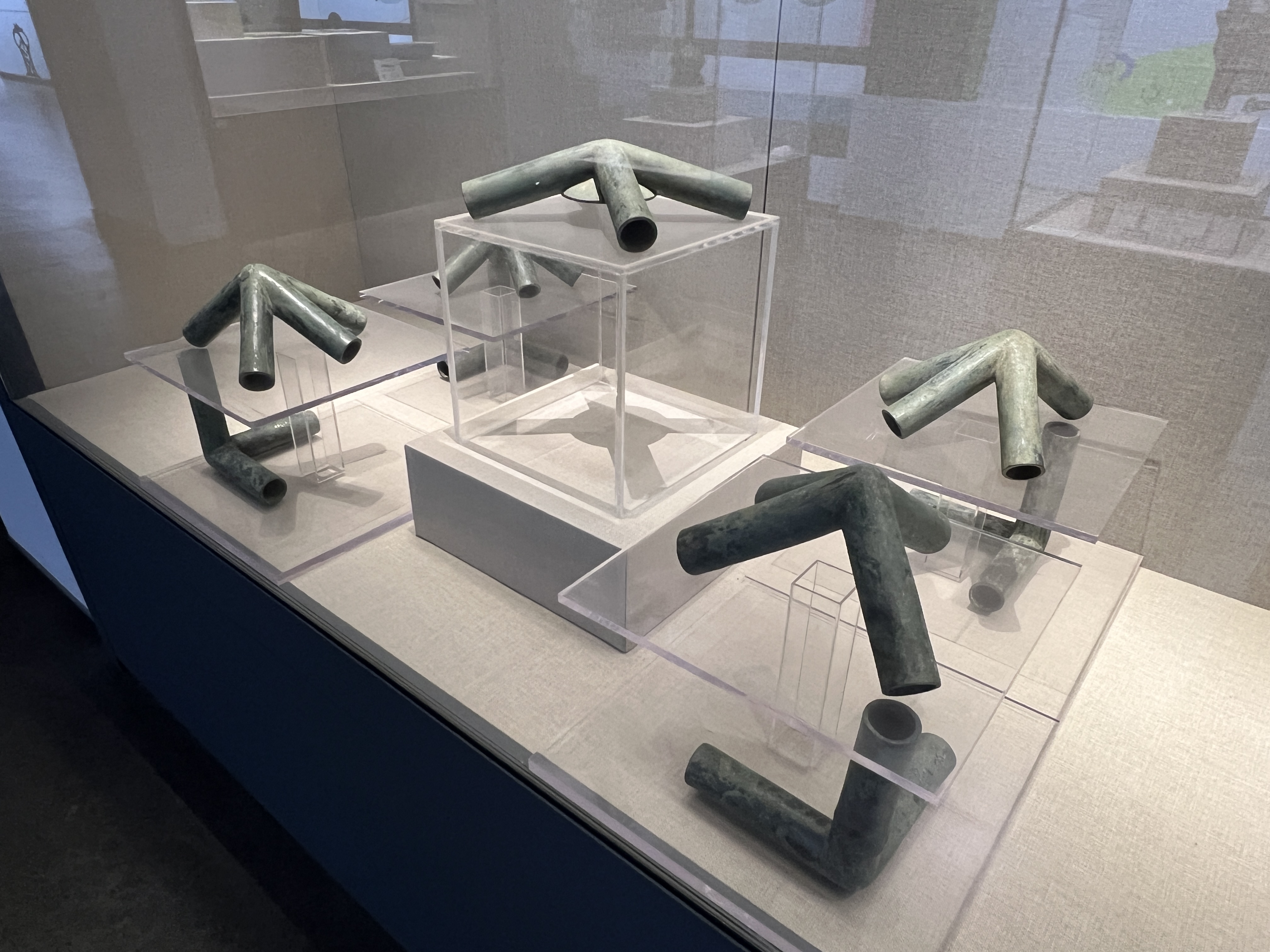
Jin Dynasty Tent Connector

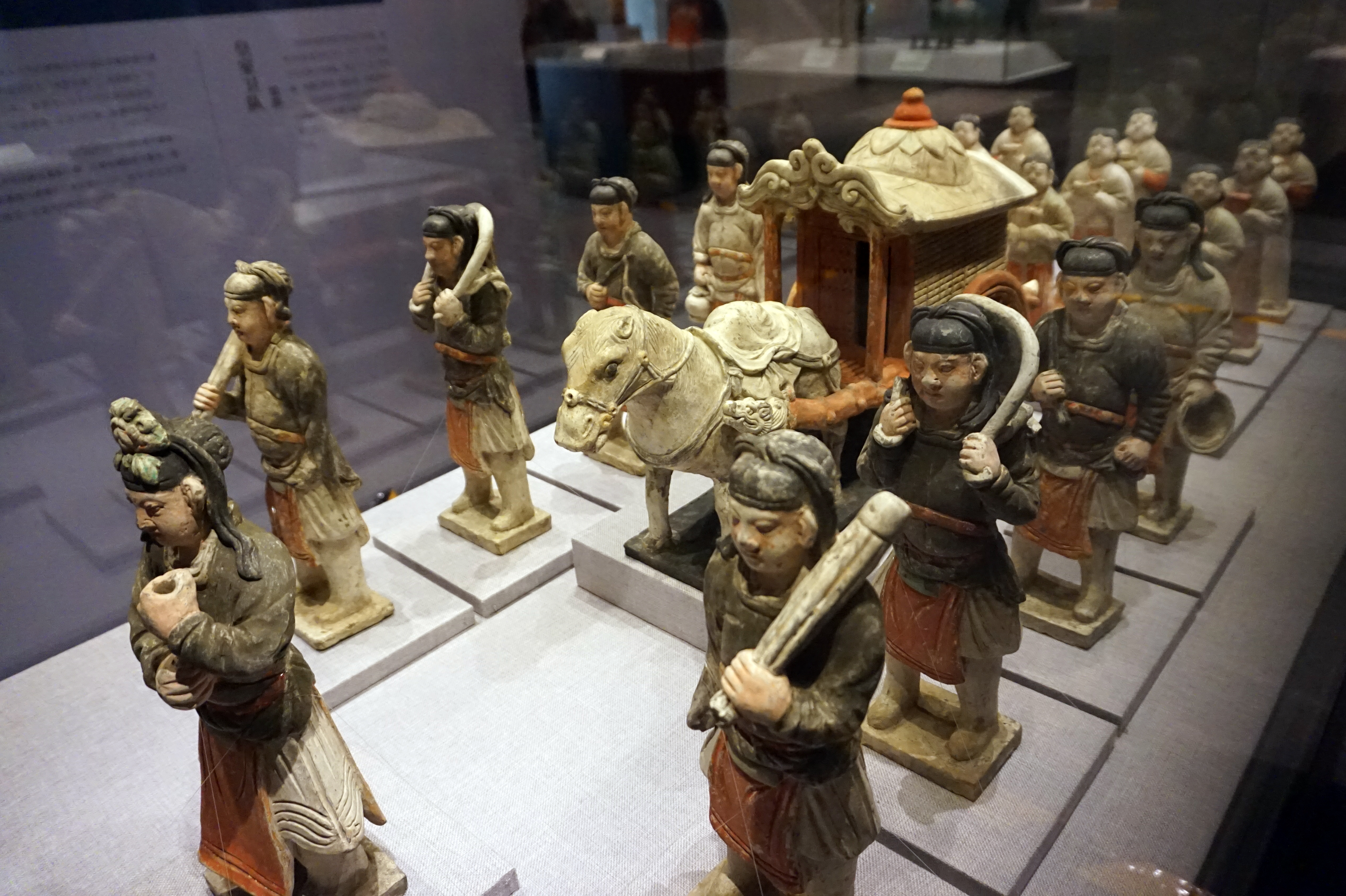
Zaju figurines

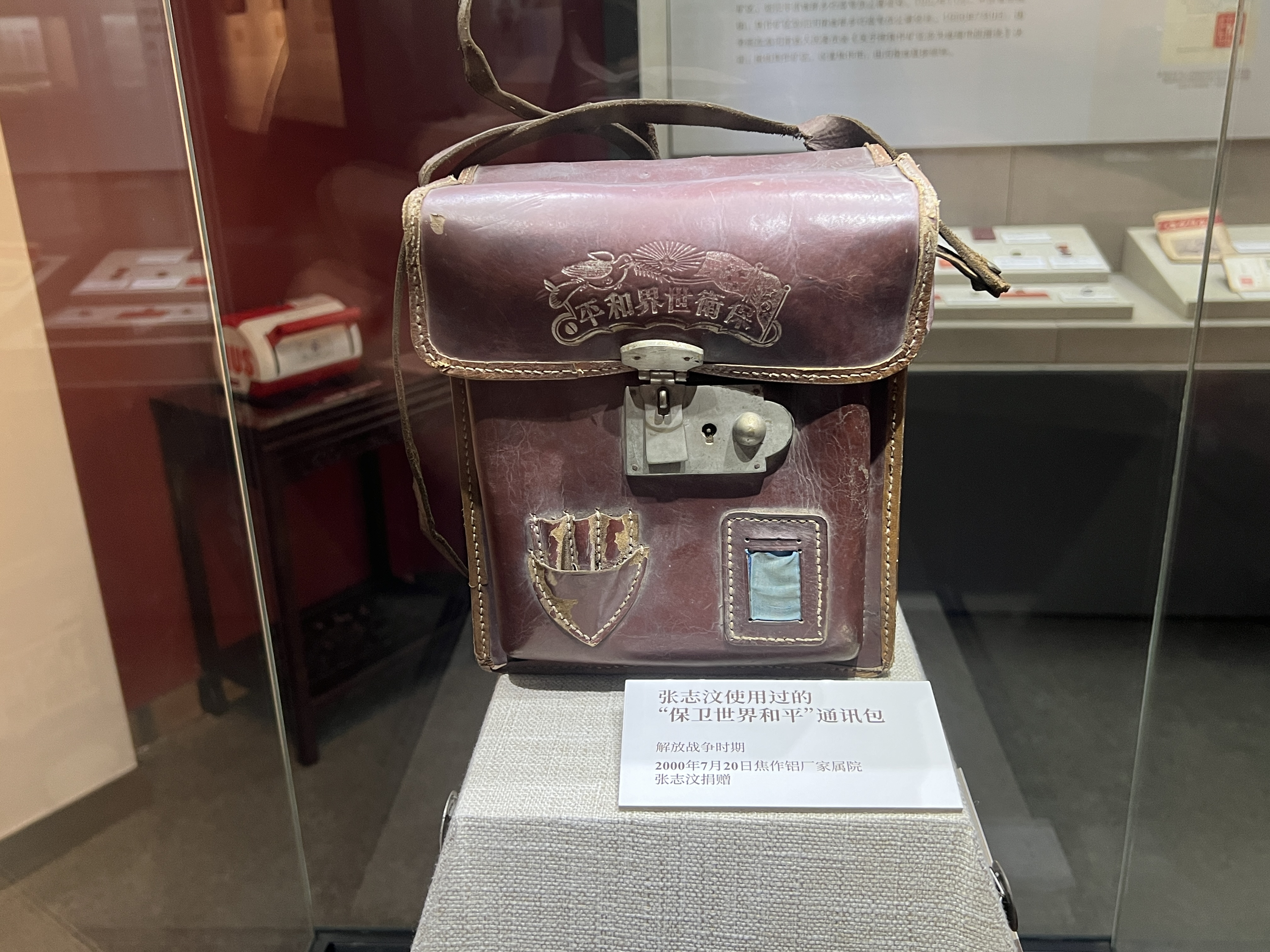
"To keep the world peace" bag
