= Jiaozuo Film and Television City =

Theme park in Jiaozuo, Henan, China

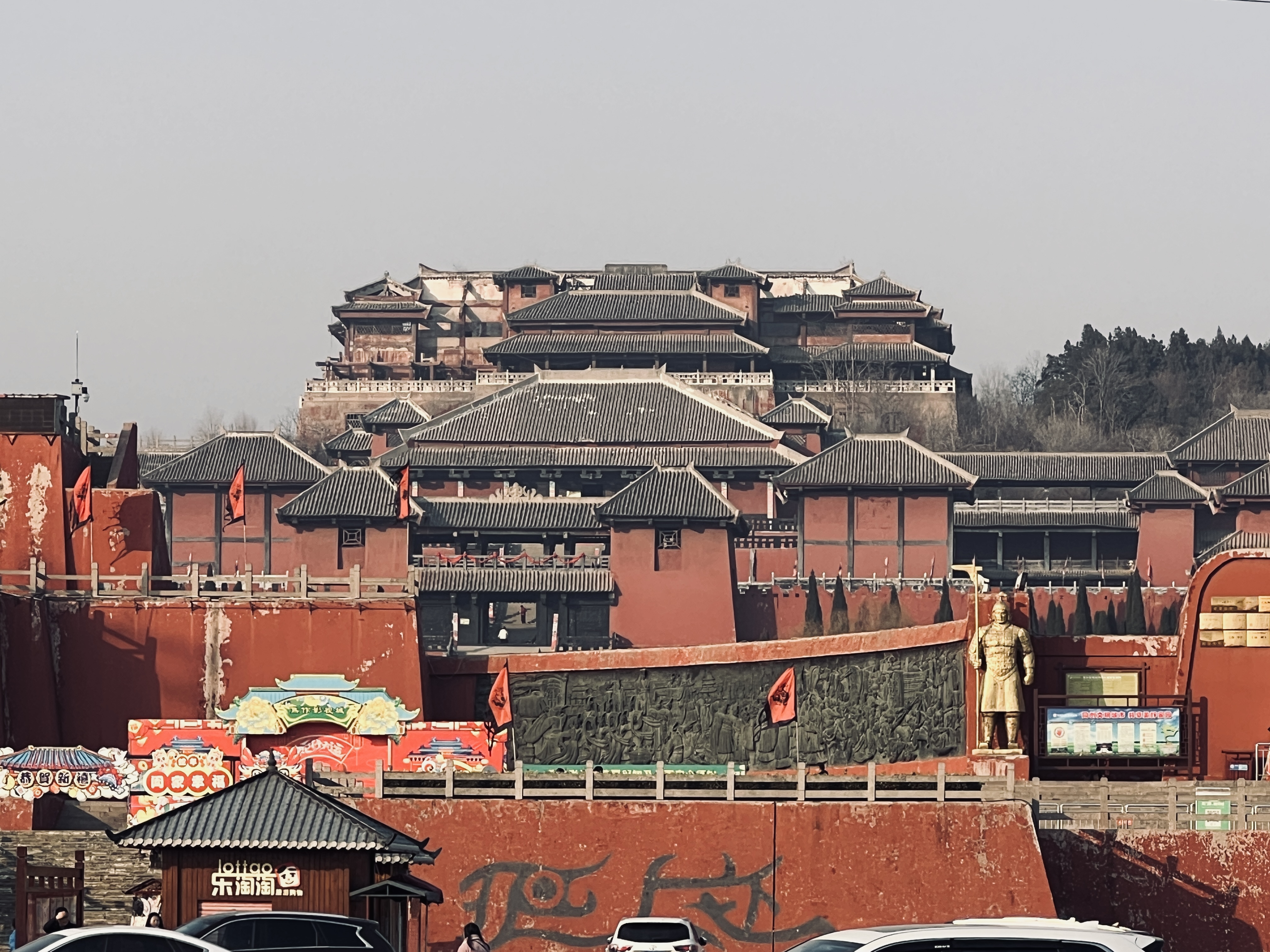
Jiaozuo Film and Television City

Jiaozuo Film and Television City (simplified Chinese: 焦作影视城; traditional Chinese: 焦作影視城) is a complex and theme park of high ancient Chinese architecture in Jiaozuo city, Henan, China. In 1995, the Jiaozuo Municipal People's Government and China Central Television jointly invested 230 million yuan to build it. It covers an area of 2.5 square kilometers with a construction area of 400,000 square meters.

The film city attempts to revive the architectural styles of the early Huaxia, and many films and TV shows set during the Shang and Zhou dynasties, the Spring and Autumn Period and the Warring States, the Qin, Han and Three Kingdoms era have been filmed here.

Currently, the complex is in a state of lacking conservation and restoration.
