= Sansheng Pagoda of Tianning Temple =

Pagoda in Qinyang, Henan, China

Coordinates: 35°05′14″N 112°56′41″E

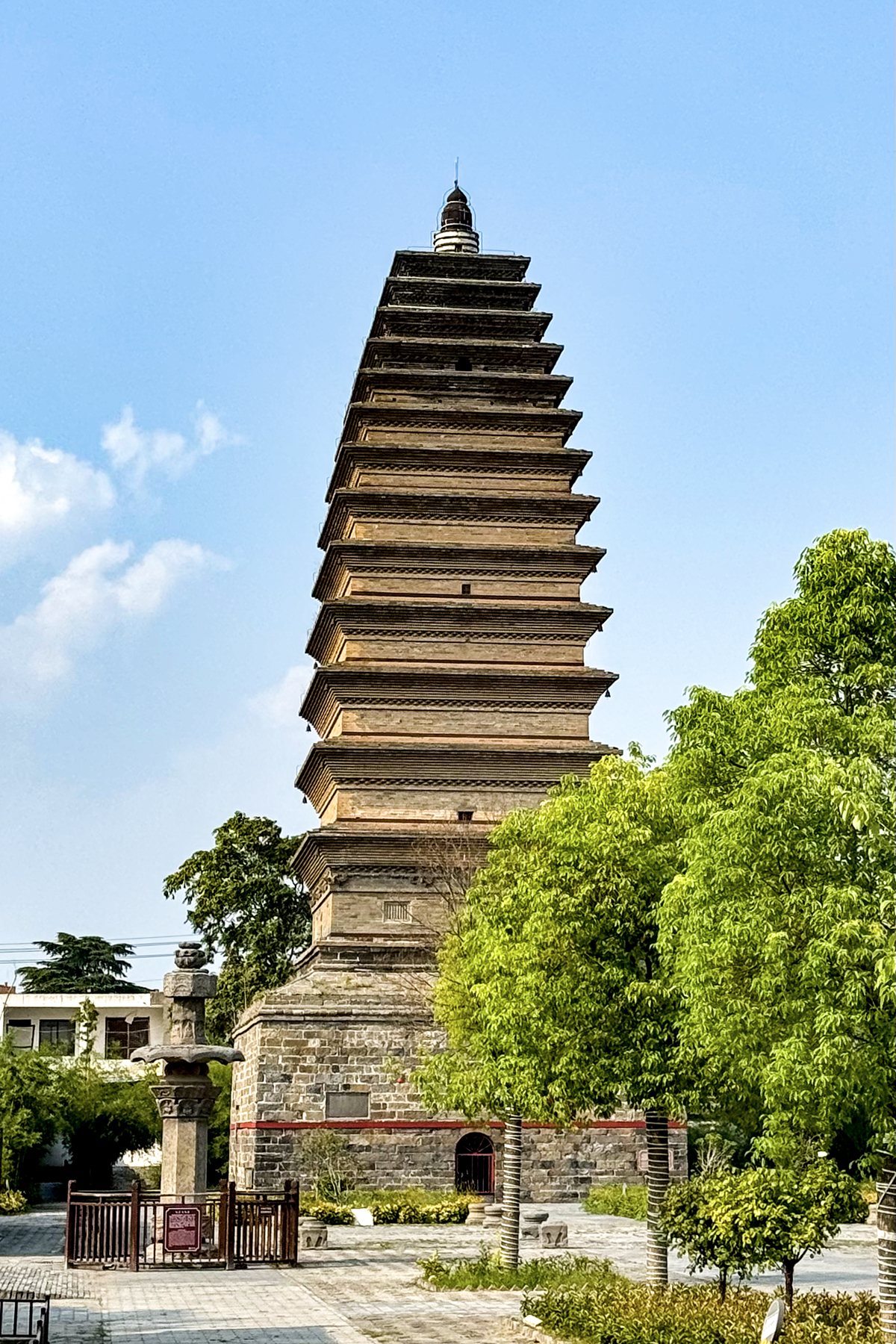
Sansheng Pagoda of Tianning Temple

Sansheng Pagoda of Tianning Temple (simplified Chinese: 天宁寺三圣塔; traditional Chinese: 天寧寺三聖塔) is a historic Buddhist pagoda located in Qinyang, Jiaozuo, Henan Province, China. The pagoda is parabolic in shape, has a height of 32.76 meters, and was initially constructed in 1171.

The Pagoda was initially constructed in the 11th year of the Dading era of the Jin Dynasty. It is a multi-eaved brick pagoda with corbelled eaves. The square base covers an area of over 140 square meters, with each side measuring 12.24 meters and a height of 6.5 meters. Above the base is a Sumeru pedestal with sides of 8.6 meters, supporting the thirteen layers of multi-eaved pagoda body.

In 1984, the People's Government of Qinyang City established the Qinyang Museum, with the pagoda situated at its center. On June 25, 2001, the Pagoda was announced by the State Council of the People's Republic of China as National Key Cultural Relics Protection Units.

== Tianning Temple ==
Beneath the pagoda once stood a temple originally built during the Sui Dynasty, initially named "Wanshou Temple." During the Tang Dynasty, it was renamed "Dayun Temple," and a wooden pavilion was constructed behind the temple. In the Dading era of the Jin Dynasty, it was renamed "Tianning Temple," and the pagoda was built on the site of the former Tang Dynasty wooden pavilion. Tianning temple was later abandoned.
