= Shanyang, Jiaozuo =

Coordinates: 35°11′08″N 113°15′56″E

Shanyang 山阳区
- District
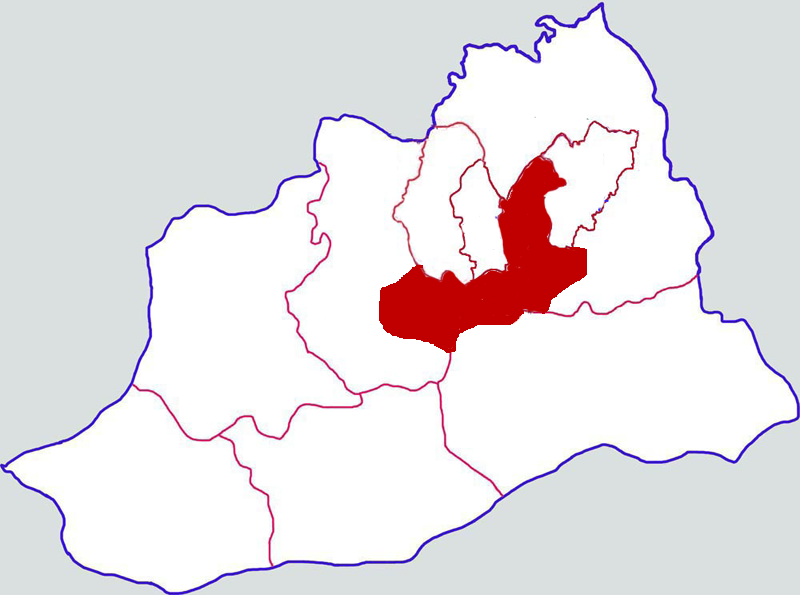
- Shanyang in Jiaozuo

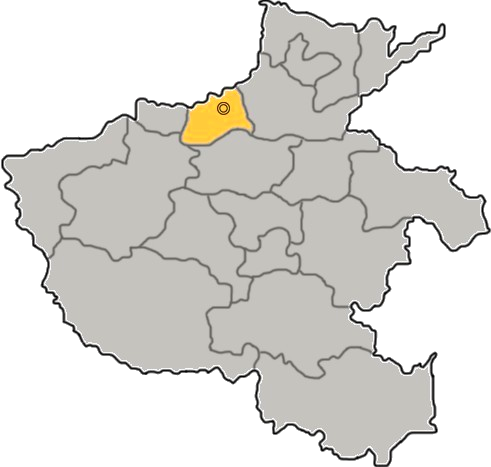
- Jiaozuo in Henan
- Country: People's Republic of China
- Province: Henan
- Prefecture-level city: Jiaozuo

Area
  - Total: 67 km^{2} (26 sq mi)

Population (2019)
  - Total: 490,300
  - Density: 7,300/km^{2} (19,000/sq mi)
- Time zone: UTC+8 (China Standard)
- Postal code: 454002

Shanyang District (simplified Chinese: 山阳区; traditional Chinese: 山陽區; pinyin: Shānyáng Qū) is a district of the city of Jiaozuo, Henan province, China.

== Administrative divisions ==
As of 2012, this district is divided to 10 subdistricts.

Subdistricts

- Baijianfang Subdistrict (百间房街道)
- Dinghe Subdistrict (定和街道)
- Dongfanghong Subdistrict (东方红街道)
- Guangya Subdistrict (光亚街道)
- Jiaodong Subdistrict (焦东街道)
- Liwan Subdistrict (李万街道)
- Taihang Subdistrict (太行街道)
- Xincheng Subdistrict (新城街道)
- Yixin Subdistrict (艺新街道)
- Zhongxing Subdistrict (中星街道)
