= Macun, Jiaozuo =

Coordinates: 35°17′05″N 113°21′32″E

Macun 马村区
- District
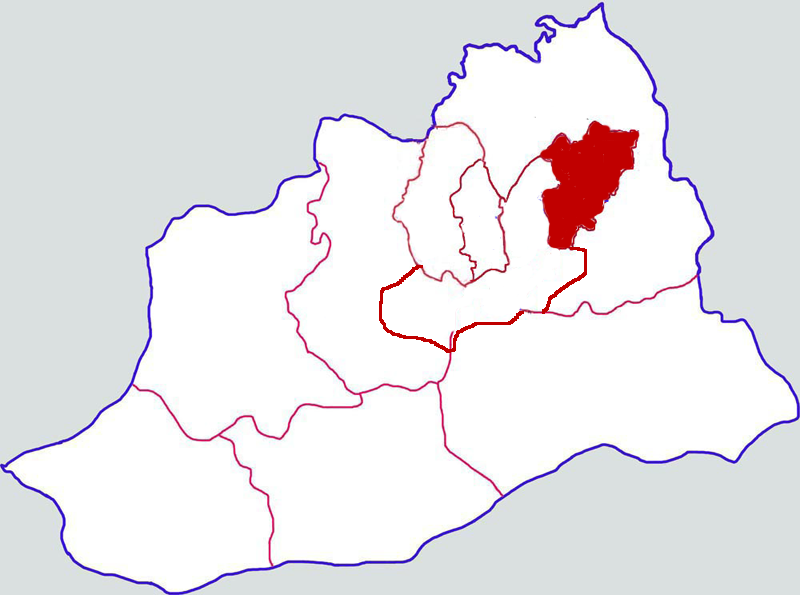
- Country: People's Republic of China
- Province: Henan
- Prefecture-level city: Jiaozuo

Area
  - Total: 118 km^{2} (46 sq mi)

Population (2019)
  - Total: 141,800
  - Density: 1,200/km^{2} (3,110/sq mi)
- Time zone: UTC+8 (China Standard)
- Postal code: 454100

Macun District (simplified Chinese: 马村区; traditional Chinese: 馬村區; pinyin: Mǎcūn Qū) is a district of Henan, China. It is under the administration of the Jiaozuo city.

== Administrative divisions ==
As of 2012, this district is divided to 7 subdistricts.

Subdistricts

- Anyangcheng Subdistrict (安阳城街道)
- Beishan Subdistrict (北山街道)
- Daiwang Subdistrict (待王街道)
- Fengying Subdistrict (冯营街道)
- Jiulishan Subdistrict (九里山街道)
- Macun Subdistrict (马村街道)
- Yanma Subdistrict (演马街道)
