= Wuzhi County =

Wuzhi County 武陟县 Wuchih
- County
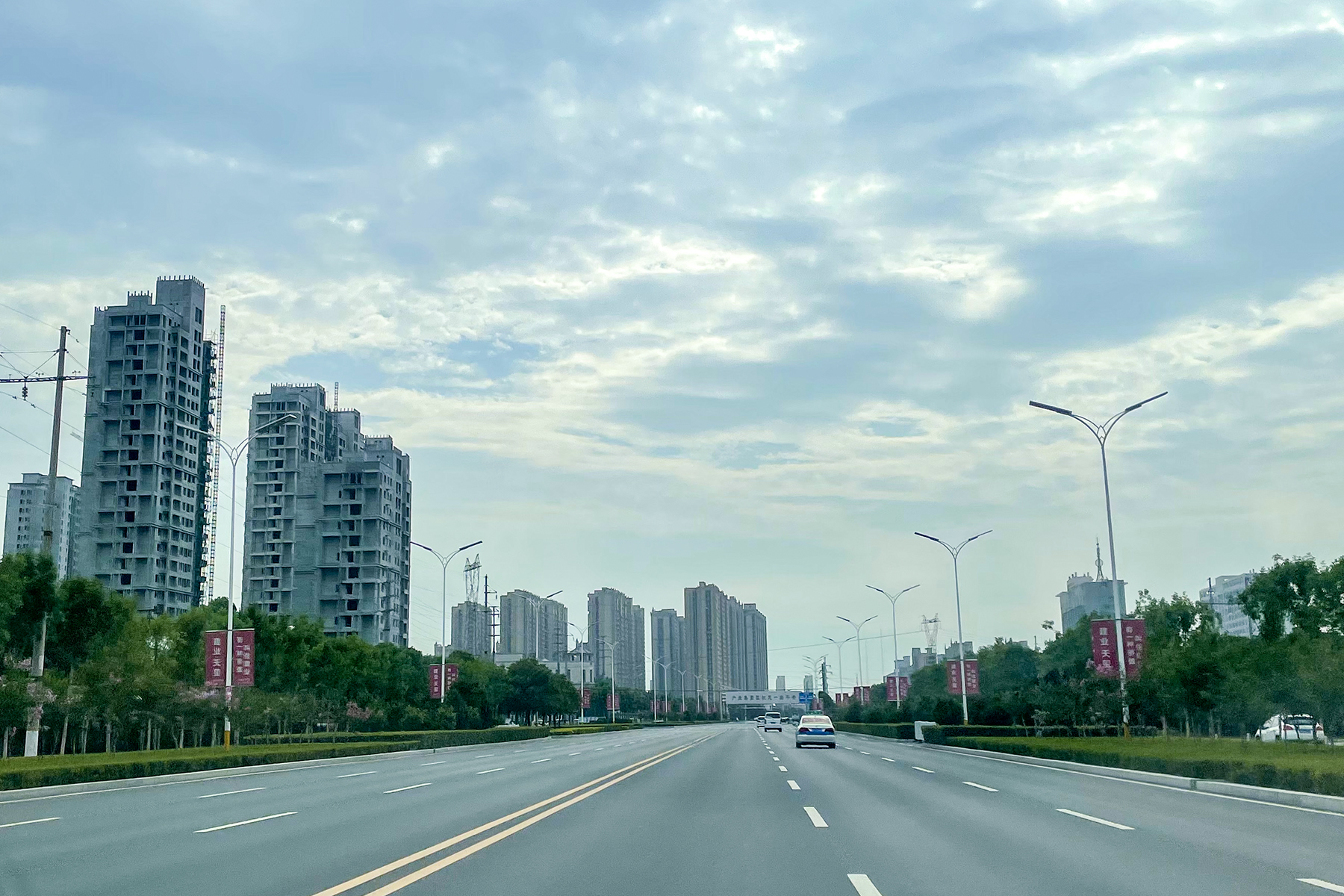

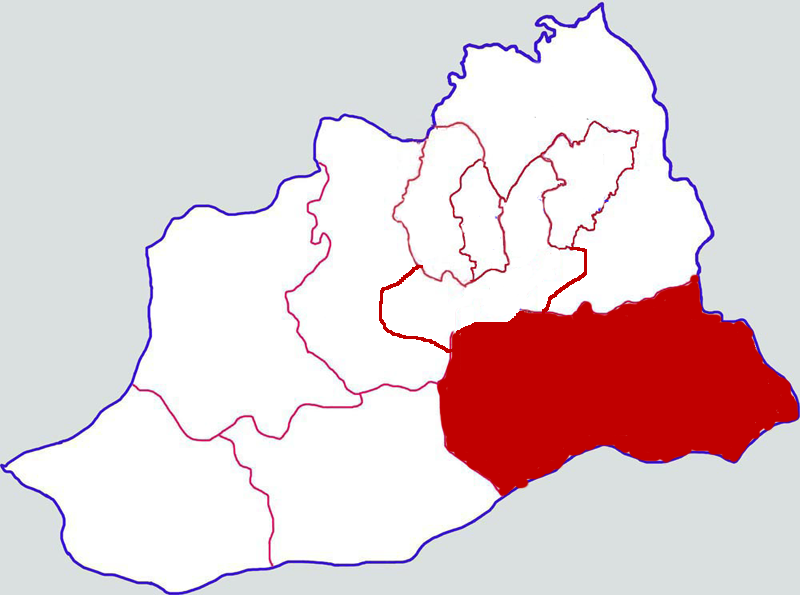
- Wuzhi in Jiaozuo

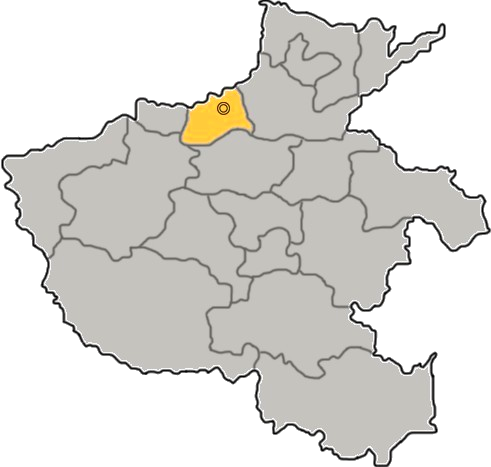
- Jiaozuo in Henan
- Coordinates: 35°05′56″N 113°24′07″E
- Country: People's Republic of China
- Province: Henan
- Prefecture-level city: Jiaozuo

Area
  - Total: 860 km^{2} (330 sq mi)

Population (2019)
  - Total: 670,300
  - Density: 780/km^{2} (2,000/sq mi)
- Time zone: UTC+8 (China Standard)
- Postal code: 454950

Wuzhi County (Chinese: 武陟县; pinyin: Wǔzhì Xiàn) is a county in the northwest of Henan province, China, situated on the northern (left) bank of the Yellow River. It is the easternmost county-level division of the prefecture-level city of Jiaozuo.

== Administrative divisions ==
As of 2016, this county is divided to 7 towns and 7 townships.

Towns

- Dafeng (大封镇)
- Longyuan (龙源镇)
- Mucheng (木城镇)
- Ningguo (宁郭镇)
- Xieqiying (谢旗营镇)
- Xitao (西陶镇)
- Zhandian (詹店镇)

Townships

- Beiguo Township (北郭乡)
- Dahongqiao Township (大虹桥乡)
- Gedidian Township (圪垱店乡)
- Guanmiao Township (乔庙乡)
- Jiaying Township (嘉应观乡)
- Sanyang Township (三阳乡)
- Xiaodong Township (小董乡)

== History ==
In the Xia Dynasty, it belonged to Jizhou and was called Qinhuai. At the beginning of Zhou Dynasty, it was called Huaiyi.

== Natural resources ==
Wuzhi is rich in natural resources. It is located in the Huangqin River alluvial plain. It has a mild climate and fertile land. It is rich in high-quality wheat, corn, rice, peanuts, etc. It is the origin of the four major Huaiyang medicines.

=== Water resources ===
Wuzhi County belongs to the intersection zone of the Yellow River and Qin River in the middle and lower reaches of the Yellow River, with the Qin River flowing through the territory. There are 15 transit rivers and six main drainage rivers belonging to the two major water systems of the Yellow River and Haihe River. The Yellow River Basin includes the Qinnan area and the two floodplain areas of the Huangqin River. The main rivers passing through it are the Yellow River, Qin River, Jian River, Ji River, and the Ersi District Lao River. The Haihe River Basin includes the eastern part of the county and the Qinbei area. The main rivers are the Dasha River, Jianggou, No. 1 Ganpai, Erganpai, Communist Canal, and Dashilao River.

== Population ==
In 2018, Wuzhi County had a total population of 727,800, a permanent population of 670,300, an urbanization rate of 44.59%, and a birth rate of 11.58‰. The mortality rate is 6.49‰ and the natural growth rate is 5.09‰. There are 18 ethnic groups in Wuzhi County, including Han, Hui, Manchu, Zhuang, Miao, Li and Tibetan. Ethnic minorities account for about 2% of the total population. Among the ethnic minorities, the Hui ethnic group has the largest population, accounting for approximately 97% of the total ethnic minority population.

== Economy ==
In 2021, Wuzhi County's regional GDP is 30.88 billion yuan; the added value of the tertiary industry is 16.29 billion yuan, 1.5 times that of 2016; the total retail sales of consumer goods is 12.72 billion yuan, 1.3 times that of 2016; the general public budget revenue is 15.5 billion, 1.3 times that of 2016; tax revenue is 1.05 billion yuan, of which the proportion of main tax types has increased from 55.9% in 2016 to 66.6% in 2021, and the total tax paid by the top 100 industries has increased from 410 million yuan to 700 million yuan; The per capita disposable income of residents was 27,772 yuan, 1.5 times that of 2016; the deposit balance of financial institutions was 28.83 billion yuan, 1.9 times that of 2016; the urbanization rate increased from 40.36% to 49.09%, and the three industrial structures increased from 9.6:60.1:30.3 Adjusted and optimized to 11.3:35.9:52.8.

== Notable people ==
Mao Changxi (1817-1882) was born in Wuzhi County, Huaiqing Prefecture, Henan Province. Daoguang Jinshi. He successively served as a bachelor of the cabinet, a minister of the Ministry of Rites, a censor of Zuodu, a minister of the Ministry of Industry, a minister of the Ministry of Personnel, a bachelor of the Hanlin Academy, and a minister of the Ministry of War.

Shantao (205-283), courtesy name Juyuan, was a native of Huai (now Xiaohong Village, west of Wuzhi), Hanoi, a minister and scholar of the Western Jin Dynasty, and one of the "Seven Sages of the Bamboo Forest." He once served as Minister of the Ministry of Personnel, and later generations praised his "Monkey Notice" for recommending talents. He wrote a collection of essays, which has been lost, but now there is a collection.

Xiang Xiu (about 227-272), courtesy name Ziqi, was born in Huai (now Xishang Village, Wuzhi), Hanoi. He was a philosopher and writer in the Wei and Jin Dynasties. He was good at poetry and was one of the "Seven Sages of the Bamboo Forest." He once commented on Zhuangzi. "Si Jiu Fu" is quite famous, but many of his works are lost.

== Transportation ==
- Jiaozheng Yellow River Bridge

== Climate ==
Climate data for Wuzhi, elevation 95 m (312 ft), (1991–2020 normals, extremes 1981–2010)
Month	Jan	Feb	Mar	Apr	May	Jun	Jul	Aug	Sep	Oct	Nov	Dec	Year
Record high °C (°F)	18.5 (65.3)	23.4 (74.1)	30.0 (86.0)	37.2 (99.0)	39.0 (102.2)	42.6 (108.7)	41.1 (106.0)	39.0 (102.2)	37.5 (99.5)	35.0 (95.0)	27.8 (82.0)	22.9 (73.2)	42.6 (108.7)
Mean daily maximum °C (°F)	5.9 (42.6)	9.8 (49.6)	15.7 (60.3)	22.2 (72.0)	27.6 (81.7)	32.6 (90.7)	32.2 (90.0)	30.7 (87.3)	27.1 (80.8)	21.9 (71.4)	14.2 (57.6)	7.8 (46.0)	20.6 (69.2)
Daily mean °C (°F)	0.4 (32.7)	4.0 (39.2)	9.6 (49.3)	15.9 (60.6)	21.4 (70.5)	26.4 (79.5)	27.4 (81.3)	25.9 (78.6)	21.4 (70.5)	15.8 (60.4)	8.6 (47.5)	2.5 (36.5)	14.9 (58.9)
Mean daily minimum °C (°F)	−3.7 (25.3)	−0.6 (30.9)	4.4 (39.9)	10.1 (50.2)	15.6 (60.1)	20.6 (69.1)	23.3 (73.9)	22.1 (71.8)	17.1 (62.8)	11.3 (52.3)	4.2 (39.6)	−1.5 (29.3)	10.2 (50.4)
Record low °C (°F)	−15.4 (4.3)	−22.4 (−8.3)	−6.5 (20.3)	−1.7 (28.9)	3.6 (38.5)	11.7 (53.1)	17.0 (62.6)	13.1 (55.6)	6.9 (44.4)	−1.5 (29.3)	−9.7 (14.5)	−11.7 (10.9)	−22.4 (−8.3)
Average precipitation mm (inches)	9.0 (0.35)	10.0 (0.39)	17.1 (0.67)	28.3 (1.11)	48.2 (1.90)	61.8 (2.43)	132.9 (5.23)	103.5 (4.07)	67.2 (2.65)	31.7 (1.25)	20.7 (0.81)	6.0 (0.24)	536.4 (21.1)
Average precipitation days (≥ 0.1 mm)	3.5	3.8	4.5	5.1	6.8	7.4	10.2	9.8	8.3	6.1	4.7	2.8	73
Average snowy days	4.2	2.9	1.2	0.1	0	0	0	0	0	0	0.9	2.3	11.6
Average relative humidity (%)	59	58	58	63	64	61	78	81	76	68	65	59	66
Mean monthly sunshine hours	120.4	138.9	179.1	204.6	228.2	211.4	189.5	188.6	161.5	160.3	140.5	136.3	2,059.3
Percentage possible sunshine	38	45	48	52	52	49	43	46	44	46	46	45	46
Source: China Meteorological Administration
