= Jiefang, Jiaozuo =

Coordinates: 35°14′25″N 113°13′46″E

Jiefang 解放区
- District
- Interactive map of Jiefang
- Country: People's Republic of China
- Province: Henan
- Prefecture-level city: Jiaozuo

Area
  - Total: 62 km^{2} (24 sq mi)

Population (2019)
  - Total: 305,000
  - Density: 4,900/km^{2} (13,000/sq mi)
- Time zone: UTC+8 (China Standard)
- Postal code: 454000

Jiefang District (Chinese: 解放; pinyin: Jiěfàng; lit. 'liberation') is a district and the seat of the city of Jiaozuo, Henan, China.

== Administrative divisions ==
As of 2012, this district is divided to 9 subdistricts.

Subdistricts

- Jiaobei Subdistrict (焦北街道)
- Jiaonan Subdistrict (焦南街道)
- Jiaoxi Subdistrict (焦西街道)
- Minsheng Subdistrict (民生街道)
- Minzhu Subdistrict (民主街道)
- Qibaijian Subdistrict (七百间街道)
- Shangbaizuo Subdistrict (上白作街道)
- Wangchu Subdistrict (王褚街道)
- Xinhua Subdistrict (新华街道)
