= Zhongzhan, Jiaozuo =

Zhongzhan 中站区
- District
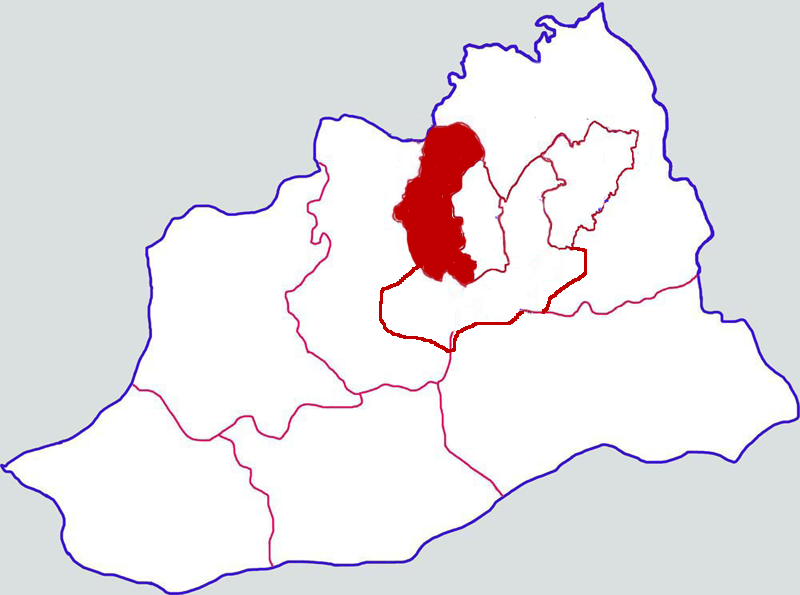
- Coordinates: 35°14′13″N 113°10′59″E
- Country: People's Republic of China
- Province: Henan
- Prefecture-level city: Jiaozuo

Area
  - Total: 124 km^{2} (48 sq mi)

Population (2019)
  - Total: 107,300
  - Density: 865/km^{2} (2,240/sq mi)
- Time zone: UTC+8 (China Standard)
- Postal code: 454000

Zhongzhan District (Chinese: 中站; pinyin: Zhōngzhàn) is a district of the city of Jiaozuo, Henan province, China, bordering Shanxi province to the northwest.

== Administrative divisions ==
As of 2012, this district is divided to 10 subdistricts.

Subdistricts

- Danhe Subdistrict (丹河街道)
- Fengfeng Subdistrict (冯封街道)
- Fucheng Subdistrict (府城街道)
- Lifeng Subdistrict (李封街道)
- Longdong Subdistrict (龙洞街道)
- Longxiang Subdistrict (龙翔街道)
- Wangfeng Subdistrict (王封街道)
- Xuheng Subdistrict (许衡街道)
- Yueshan Subdistrict (月山街道)
- Zhucun Subdustrict (朱村街道)
