= Jiaozuo =

Jiaozuo 焦作市 Tsiaotso
- Prefecture-level city
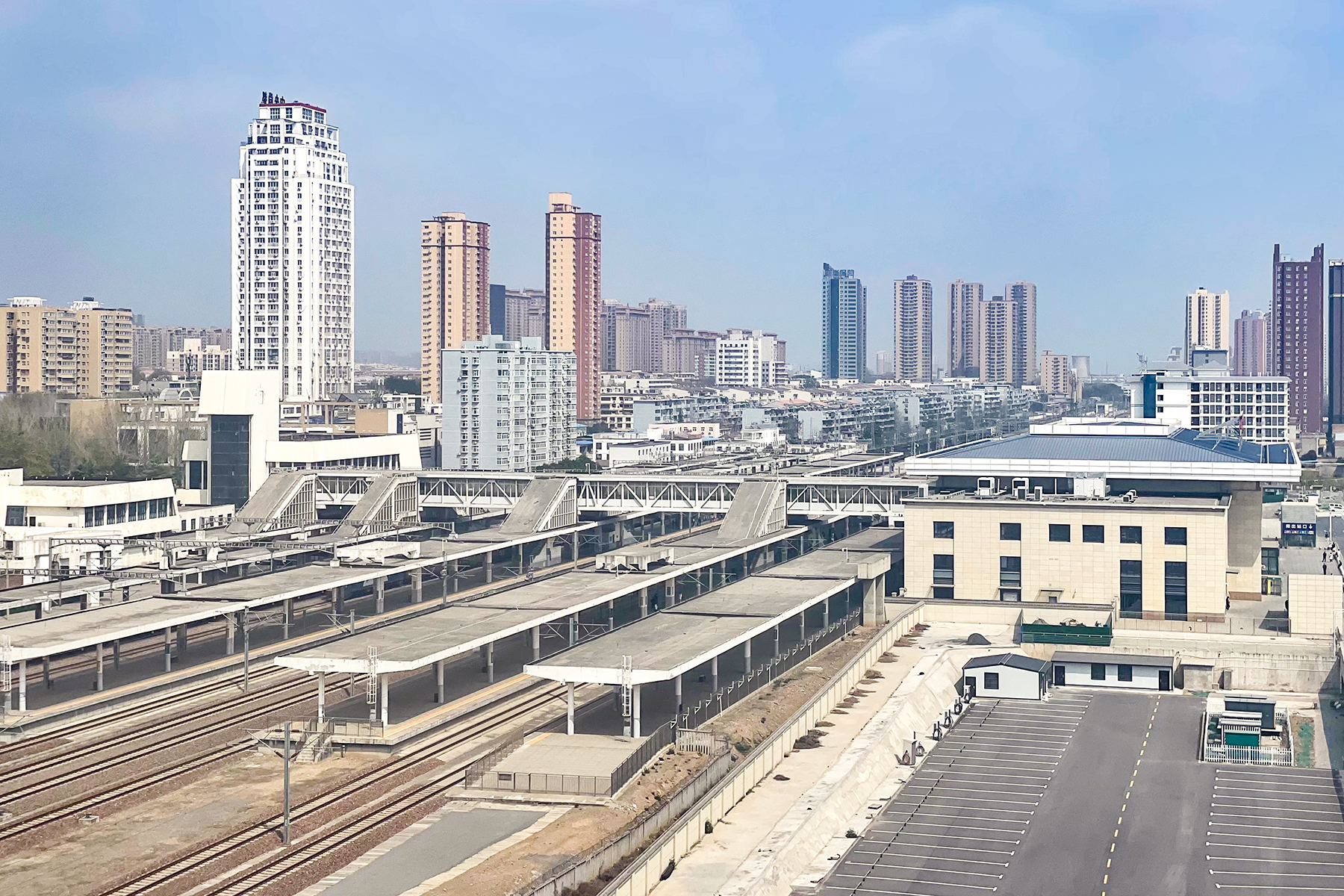
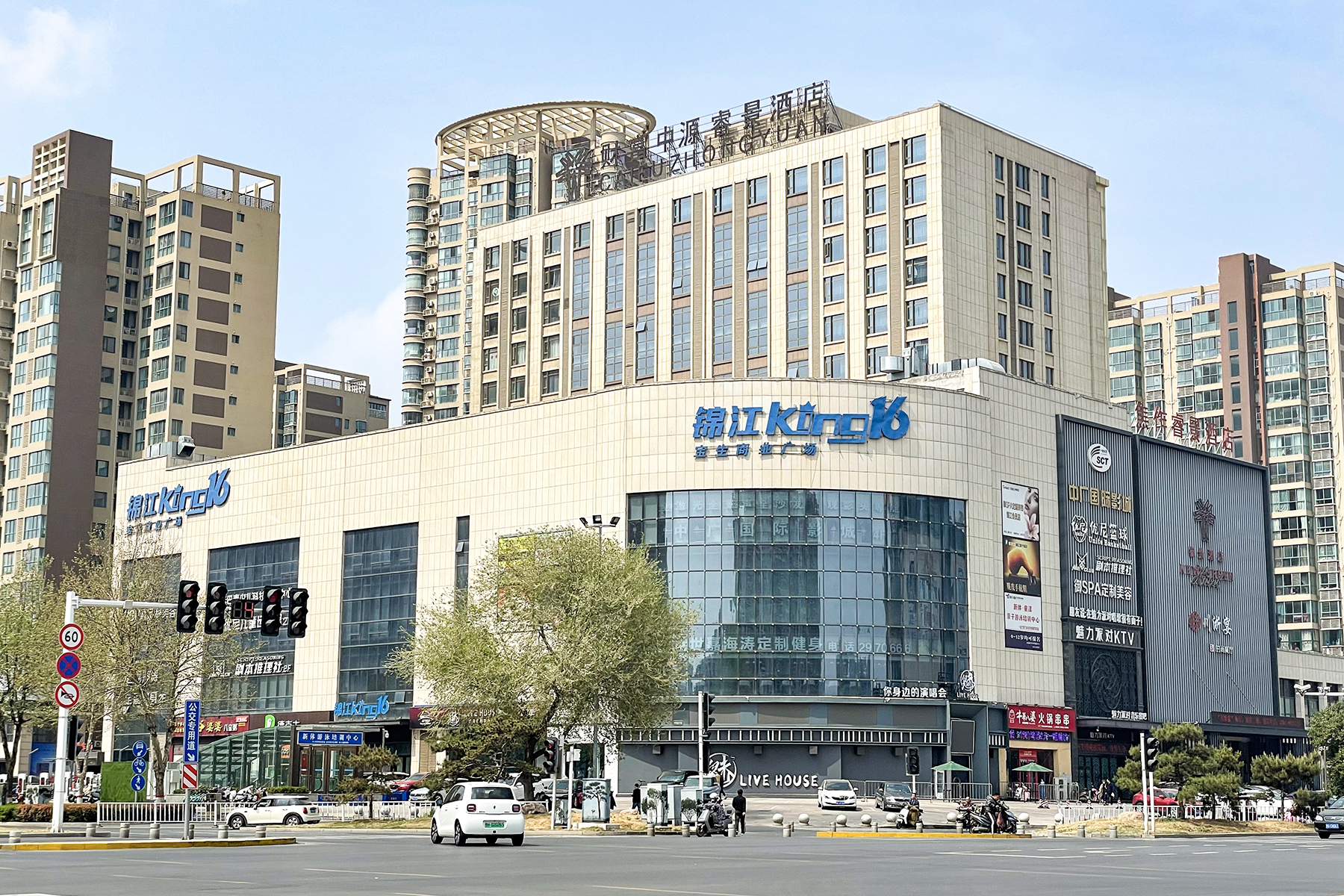
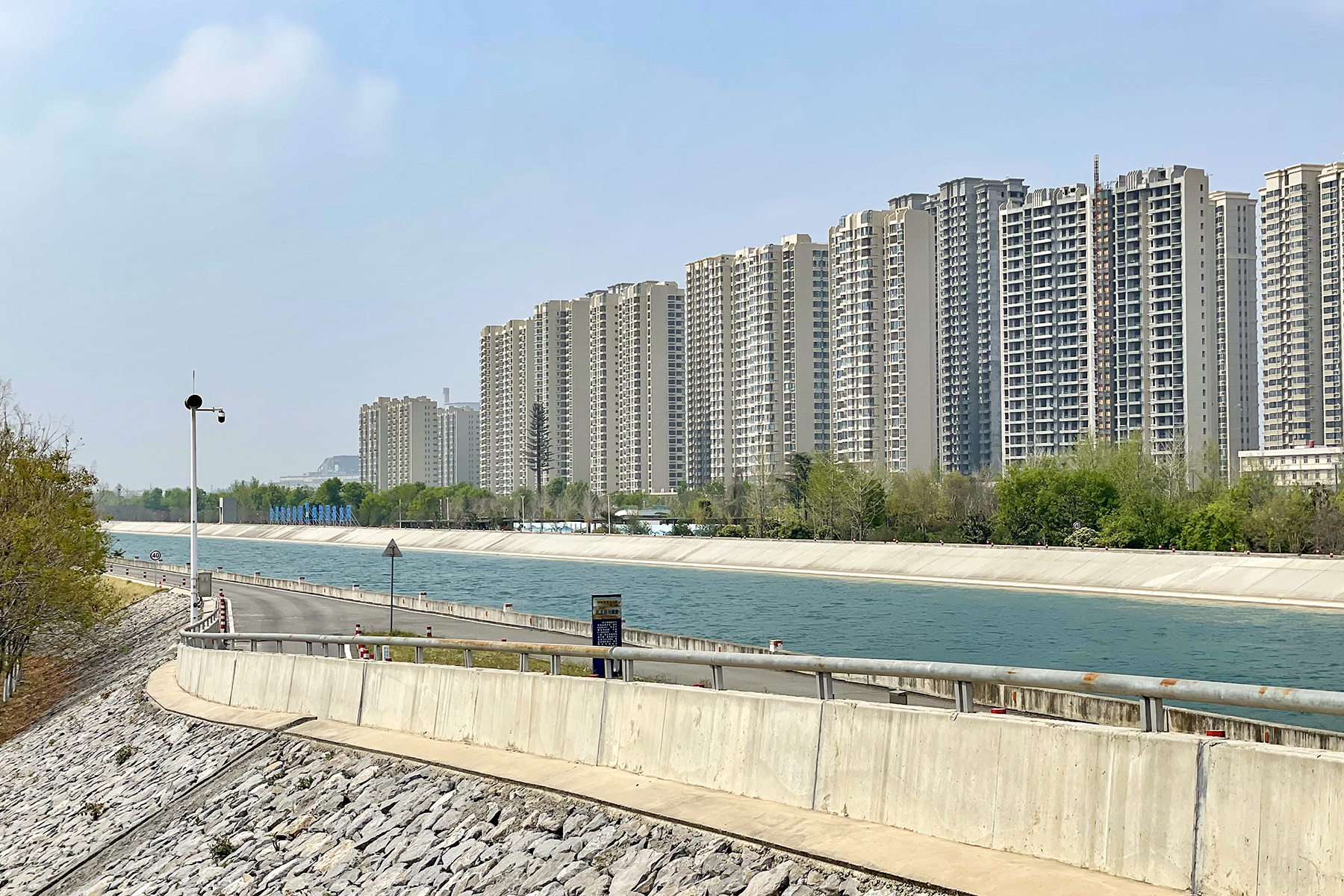
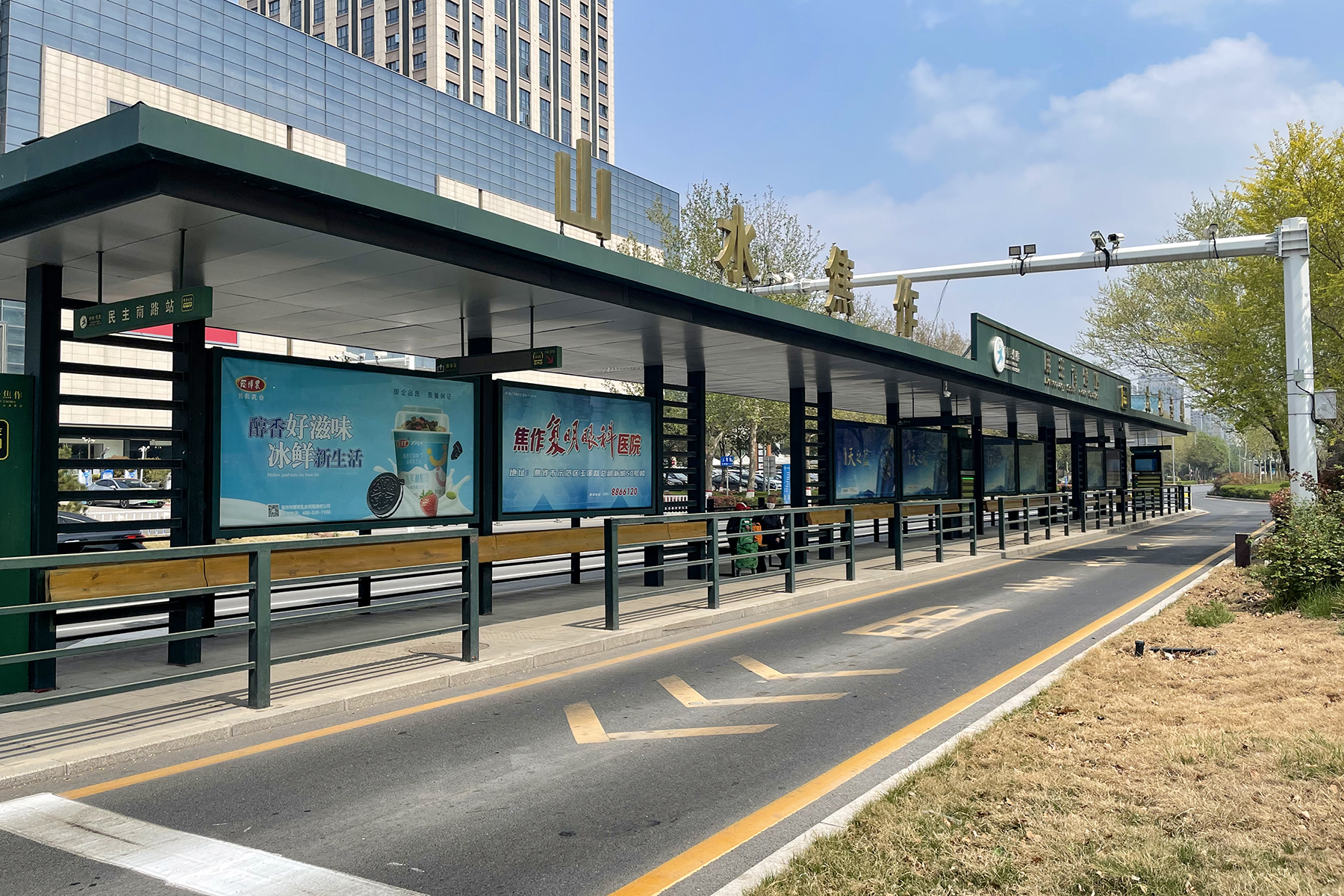
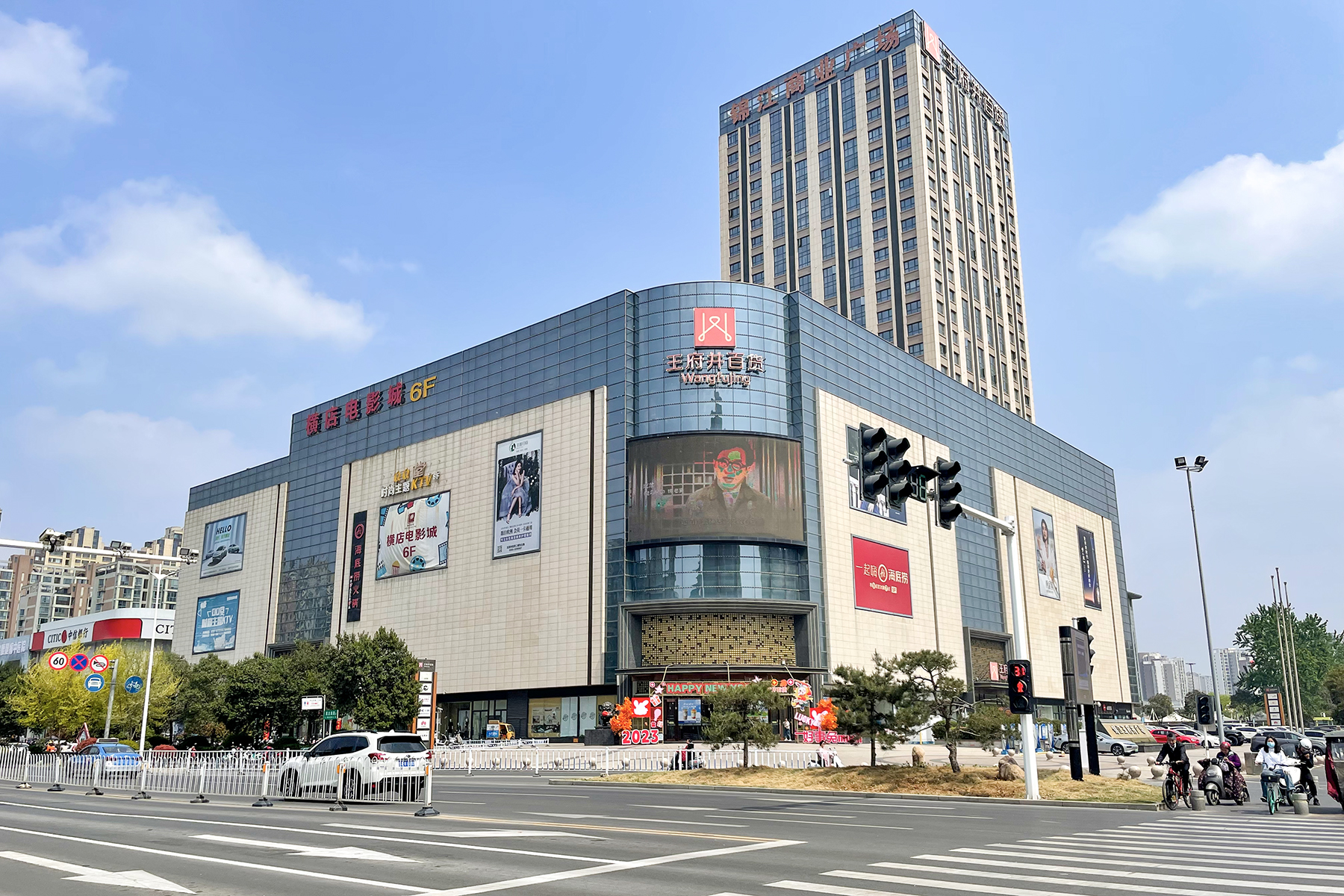
- Jiaozuo railway station Jinjiang King16 Central Line of South–North Water Transfer Minzhu Nanlu bus stop Wangfujing Department Store

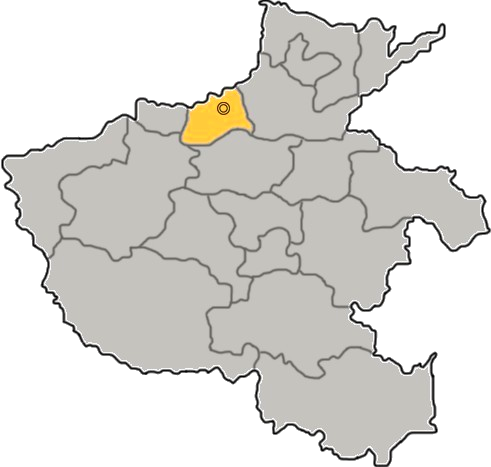
- Jiaozuo in Henan

- Location on the North China Plain Jiaozuo (China)
- Coordinates (Jiaozuo municipal government): 35°12′57″N 113°14′31″E
- Country: People's Republic of China
- Province: Henan
- Municipal seat: Jiefang District

Area
  - Prefecture-level city: 4,000.9 km^{2} (1,544.8 sq mi)
  - Urban: 413.8 km^{2} (159.8 sq mi)
  - Metro: 896.3 km^{2} (346.1 sq mi)
- Elevation: 139 m (456 ft)

Population (2018 estimation)
  - Prefecture-level city: 3,590,700
  - Density: 897.47/km^{2} (2,324.4/sq mi)
  - Urban: 1,044,400
  - Urban density: 2,524/km^{2} (6,537/sq mi)
  - Metro: 1,424,500
  - Metro density: 1,589/km^{2} (4,116/sq mi)

GDP
  - Prefecture-level city: CN¥ 209.5 billion US$ 31.5 billion
  - Per capita: CN¥ 59,183; US$ 8,910
- Time zone: UTC+8 (China Standard)
- Postal code: 454000
- Area code: 0391
- ISO 3166 code: CN-HA-08
- Major Nationalities: Han, Hui
- County-level divisions: 10
- Township-level divisions: 116
- License plate prefixes: 豫H
- Website: link

Jiaozuo (Chinese: 焦作; pinyin: Jiāozuò [tɕjáʊ.tswô]; postal: Tsiaotso) is a prefecture-level city in the northwest of Henan province, China. Sitting on the northern bank of the Yellow River, it borders the provincial capital of Zhengzhou to the south, Xinxiang to the east, Jiyuan to the west, Luoyang to the southwest, and the province of Shanxi to the north. Jiaozuo is one of the core cities of the Central Plains urban agglomeration and a regional central city along the Shanxi–Henan border area.

Its population was 3,590,700 as of the 2018 estimate whom 1,424,500 lived in the built-up area made of 4 urban districts (Jiefang, Shanyang, Zhongzhan and Macun) and Bo'ai County largely being urbanized.

== History ==
=== Ancient History ===
In the Jiaozuo Administrative Region, human tribes existed as early as the matriarchal commune period, more than 8,000 years ago.

The Xia dynasty was under the jurisdiction of Jizhou and was called Qinhuai Land. "Yu Gong" divides the world into nine states belonging to Jizhou.

The Shang dynasty and the Western Zhou dynasty belonged to the interior of Ji. According to the "Hanshu Geography", after the Zhou dynasty destroyed the Shang dynasty, it belonged to the three kingdoms of Yong, Xin and Wen. The Eastern Zhou dynasty belonged to the Nanyang territory of Jin, and the Warring States period belonged to the two kingdoms of Wei and Wei.

From the Qin dynasty to Sanchuan County, it belonged to Hanoi County from the Han dynasty to the Three Kingdoms period.

The Jin dynasty was divided into Hanoi County, Ji County, and Xingyang County in Sizhou; the Southern and Northern Dynasties were divided into Hanoi County and Xingyang County; the Later Wei dynasty was divided into Hanoi County, Wude County, Sizhou Ji County, Xingyang County, and Donghengnong County in Huaizhou (Eastern Wei, formerly Wu, Yangwu County belongs to Guangwu County of Northern Yuzhou); Northern Qi dynasty belongs to Ji County of Sizhou.

In the Sui dynasty, it belonged to Hanoi County, Ji County, and Xingyang County; in the Tang dynasty, it belonged to Huaizhou and Hanoi County of Hebei Province, Heyang Sancheng Shimengzhou (i.e. Mengzhou), Henan County of Henan Prefecture of Henan Province, and Xingyang County of Zhengzhou.

In the Five Dynasties, it belonged to Huaizhou and Mengzhou; in the Song dynasty, it belonged to Huaizhou and Hanoi County on the West Road of Hebei Province; and to Jiyuan County (governing Mengzhou) on the Northwest Road of Beijing; in the Jin dynasty, it belonged to Huaizhou and Mengzhou on the South Road of Henan Province.

The Yuan dynasty belongs to Huaiqing Road and Mengzhou, Yannan and Hebei Roads.

In the Ming dynasty, it belonged to Huaiqing Mansion (governing Hanoi, today's Qinyang) and was under the jurisdiction of Henan Province (later changed to Henan Chief Envoy Department).

The Qing dynasty belonged to Huaiqing Prefecture of Henan Province and included Hanoi County, Jiyuan County, Xiuwu County, Wuzhi County, Wen County, Meng County, Yuanwu County and Yangwu County.

=== Modern History ===
In 1910, the Qing government established Jiaozuo Town in Xiuwu County.

In 1912, the county-prefecture was abolished, and Hanoi County was changed to Huai Khanh Prefecture.

In 1913 Fu Cun County was abolished, and Huaiqing Prefecture was renamed Qinyang County. The counties of the original Huaiqing Prefecture belonged to Henan Province, Henan Province.

In 1914, it was changed to Hebei Road.

In August 1927, the eastern part of Qinyang County was analyzed, and Boai County was established.

In 1932, the counties of the former Huaiqing Prefecture were affiliated with the Office of the Fourth Administrative Inspectorate of Henan Province.

On September 8, 1945, Jiaozuo was captured by the Daoqing detachment (composed of the seventh and eighth divisions of the Taihang Military Region) of the communists. Jiaozuo City was established. It was under the Eighth Special Administrative Office of Taihang District. In November, it was changed to the Fourth Special Administrative Office, which governed Jiaozuo and Wen County, Xiuwu, Wuzhi, Boai and other counties. In October 1946 Jiaozuo was occupied by the Kuomintang who held control until October 1948 when it again fell under the control of the communists. In March 1948, The Fourth Taihang Office had abolished Jiaozuo City and established Jiaozuo County.

=== Under the PRC ===
In May 1949, the Fourth Special Office of Taihang District was changed to the Xinxiang Special Office (stationed in Jiaozuo and moved to Xinxiang in March 1953), with jurisdiction over Jiaozuo and Xinxiang cities as well as Huojia, Huixian, Xinxiang, Xiuwu, Wuzhi, and Qinyang, Wen County, Boai and other 9 counties. In August of the same year, the Pingyuan Provincial Committee of the Chinese Communist Party and the Provincial People's Government were established in Xinxiang; in September, the Pingyuan Provincial People's Government issued an order, regarding Jiyuan and other 15 counties. In the same month, Jiaozuo Mining Bureau was established; in October, Jiaozuo County was changed to Jiaozuo Mining Area.

In November 1952, the organizational structure of Pingyuan Province was abolished, and the Jiaozuo mining area and counties such as Jiyuan, Qinyang, Wenxian, Mengxian, Xiuwu, Wuzhi, and Boai were placed under the Xinxiang Special Administration Bureau of Henan Province.

On July 9, 1956, the State Council approved the Henan Provincial People's Committee's "Report on Converting the Jiaozuo Mining Area into a Provincial Municipality" decision: the Jiaozuo Mining Area was abolished, and Jiaozuo City was established, under the direct leadership of Henan Province.

In December 1958, the State Council approved the entrustment of Jiaozuo City to the Xinxiang Special Administrative Office (District).

In December 1959, Xiuwu County and Boai County were placed under Jiaozuo City.

In August 1960, Xiuwu County, Boai County and Wen County were abolished, and their administrative areas were merged into Jiaozuo City and Qinyang County, respectively.

In October 1961, Xiuwu County, Boai County, and Wen County were restored and placed under the Xinxiang Special Administrative Office.

In January 1974, Jiaozuo City came under the dual leadership of Henan Province and Xinxiang Special Administrative Office.

In March 1982, the Provincial Party Committee and the Provincial Government decided to make Jiaozuo City a provincial municipality.

In September 1983, Xiuwu County and Boai County were transferred to Jiaozuo City from the Xinxiang Special Administration Bureau.

In January 1986, Jiyuan County, Qinyang County, Wen County, Meng County, and Wuzhi County were placed under Jiaozuo City.

In August 1988, Jiyuan County was abolished, and Jiyuan City was established (it came under the province's jurisdiction in January 1997).

In September 1989, Qinyang County was abolished, and Qinyang City was established.

In May 1996, Meng County was abolished, and Mengzhou City was established.

In March 2010, Jiaozuo New District was established (in March 2014, it was renamed Jiaozuo Urban-rural Integration Demonstration Zone); by the end of 2019, Jiaozuo City governs Qinyang City, Mengzhou City, Boai County, Wuzhi County, Xiu County There are 4 counties of Wu County and Wen County, 4 districts of Jiefang District, Shanyang District, Zhongzhan District, Macun District and Jiaozuo City Urban-rural Integration Demonstration Zone.

== Administration ==
The prefecture-level city of Jiaozuo administers 4 districts, 2 county-level cities and 4 counties.

- Jiefang District
- Shanyang District
- Zhongzhan District
- Macun District
- Qinyang City
- Mengzhou City
- Xiuwu County
- Wuzhi County
- Wen County
- Bo'ai County

Map
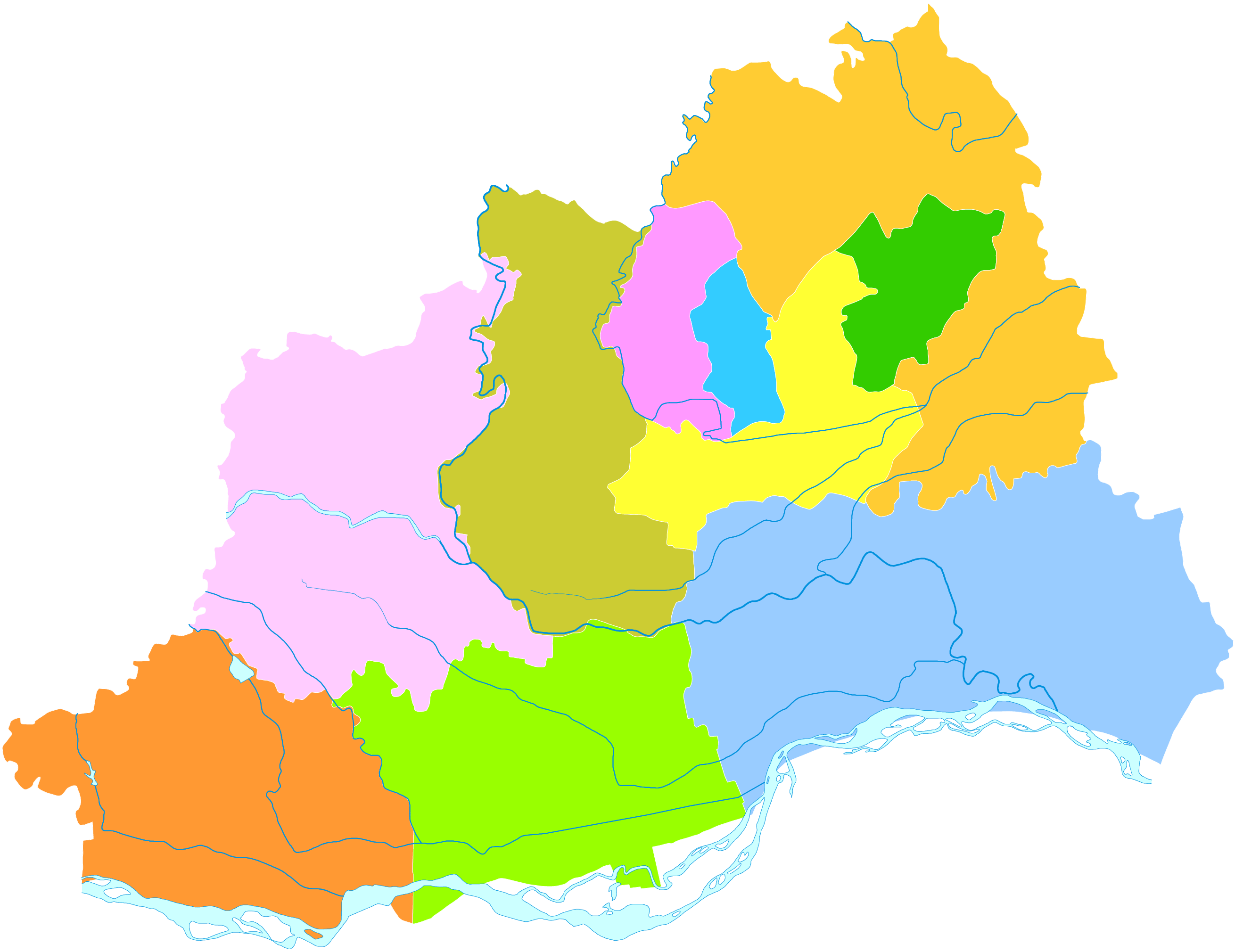

== Geography ==
Jiaozuo is located adjacent to the Yellow River and is just south of the Taihang Mountain.

In the southern foothills of the Taihang Mountains in the northern part of Jiaozuo, there are about 500 square miles of gravel slopes. The geology is hard and stable, and the strata have great endurance. It is also close to mines, water sources, traffic arteries and cities and towns.

=== Climate ===
Jiaozuo has a temperate semi-arid climate (Köppen BSk) with four distinct seasons; owing to the shielding influence of the Taihang Mountains, temperatures in the urban core of Jiaozuo are warmer than in Xinxiang and Zhengzhou. Winters are cool and relatively dry while summers are hot and often rainy. The normal monthly mean temperature ranges from 1.3 °C (34.3 °F) in January to 27.7 °C (81.9 °F) in July, with the annual mean temperature at 15.61 °C (60.1 °F). Extremes exist from −22.4 °C (−8.3 °F) to 43.6 °C (110.5 °F). Precipitation averages 552 mm (21.7 in) annually.

Climate data for Jiaozuo, elevation 112 m (367 ft), (1991–2020 normals, extremes 1981–2010)
Month	Jan	Feb	Mar	Apr	May	Jun	Jul	Aug	Sep	Oct	Nov	Dec	Year
Record high °C (°F)	20.0 (68.0)	25.4 (77.7)	31.7 (89.1)	37.0 (98.6)	40.8 (105.4)	43.5 (110.3)	40.4 (104.7)	39.0 (102.2)	38.6 (101.5)	35.9 (96.6)	27.5 (81.5)	24.6 (76.3)	43.5 (110.3)
Mean daily maximum °C (°F)	6.1 (43.0)	10.3 (50.5)	16.2 (61.2)	22.9 (73.2)	28.4 (83.1)	32.9 (91.2)	32.9 (91.2)	31.4 (88.5)	27.6 (81.7)	22.1 (71.8)	14.5 (58.1)	8.2 (46.8)	21.1 (70.0)
Daily mean °C (°F)	1.6 (34.9)	5.2 (41.4)	10.9 (51.6)	17.3 (63.1)	22.9 (73.2)	27.3 (81.1)	28.3 (82.9)	27.0 (80.6)	22.7 (72.9)	16.9 (62.4)	9.6 (49.3)	3.6 (38.5)	16.1 (61.0)
Mean daily minimum °C (°F)	−2.2 (28.0)	1.0 (33.8)	6.1 (43.0)	12.1 (53.8)	17.6 (63.7)	22.1 (71.8)	24.4 (75.9)	23.3 (73.9)	18.4 (65.1)	12.3 (54.1)	5.3 (41.5)	−0.2 (31.6)	11.7 (53.0)
Record low °C (°F)	−12.9 (8.8)	−17.8 (0.0)	−5.1 (22.8)	0.3 (32.5)	8.2 (46.8)	13.4 (56.1)	17.4 (63.3)	13.9 (57.0)	8.5 (47.3)	−0.8 (30.6)	−6.7 (19.9)	−10.8 (12.6)	−17.8 (0.0)
Average precipitation mm (inches)	8.5 (0.33)	11.1 (0.44)	18.4 (0.72)	30.8 (1.21)	49.1 (1.93)	67.8 (2.67)	140.8 (5.54)	102.0 (4.02)	63.1 (2.48)	35.2 (1.39)	25.8 (1.02)	6.1 (0.24)	558.7 (21.99)
Average precipitation days (≥ 0.1 mm)	3.3	3.9	4.3	5.7	7.0	7.9	11.1	10.3	8.3	6.4	5.1	2.6	75.9
Average snowy days	4.2	3.1	1.1	0.1	0	0	0	0	0	0	1.1	2.3	11.9
Average relative humidity (%)	55	52	51	55	55	56	71	74	68	63	60	54	60
Mean monthly sunshine hours	117.5	131.9	176.2	205.3	225.8	204.1	178.0	179.6	157.7	160.2	142.3	131.0	2,009.6
Percentage possible sunshine	38	42	47	52	52	47	41	44	43	46	46	43	45
Source: China Meteorological Administration

== Economy ==
Economy of Jiaozuo has undergone significant restructuring from resource extraction to diversified industries. Its modern development was based on the region's rich coal deposits. After a century of mining, Jiaozuo's coal resources became exhausted in the 2000s.

From the onset of coal mining until the early 1990s, the value-added of industries related to coal accounted for over 90% of Jiaozuo's industrial added value. Economic expansion based on the coal-mining industry has included a large thermal power station and basic chemical and synthetic rubber plants. The yields of soda ash and automotive tires produced by these industries account for a large portion of the total output produced in Henan. Other industries, such as the manufacture of machinery, textiles, and construction materials, have also been developed.

The city has realized the transformation since 2008. The city has significantly increased the share of manufacturing industries in its added value while drastically reducing the proportion of coal mining and other extractive sectors.

In 2019, the city's GDP reached 276.11 billion yuan, an increase of 8.0% over the previous year. Specifically, the value added of the primary industry was 14.98 billion yuan, up by 4.2%; The added value of the secondary industry was 148.02 billion yuan, up by 8.7%; The value added of the tertiary industry was 113.12 billion yuan, up by 7.5%. Per capita GDP was 76,827 yuan. The structure of the tertiary industry changed from 5.5:53.9:40.6 in the previous year to 5.4:53.6:41.0, and the proportion of tertiary industry increased by 0.4 percentage points over the previous year. Tourism has emerged as a significant economic sector, with Yuntai Mountain among the major attractions.

=== Agriculture ===
Jiaozuo is renowned for its high grain yield, which is the highest in Henan province, by itself already one of the largest grain producers of China.

Traditional Chinese medicinal herbs are important economic crops in Jiaozuo. Chinese yam, chrysanthemum, achyranthes, and rehmannia are collectively listed as "Four Great Huai Medicines".

== Population ==
According to the results of the seventh national census, as of 0:00 on November 1, 2020, the permanent population of Jiaozuo City was 3,521,078 people. Compared with the 3,539,860 people in the sixth national census in 2010, the population decreased by 18,782 in 10 years.

As of the end of 2022, Jiaozuo City has a permanent population of 3.5235 million, including 2.2674 million urban residents and 1.2561 million rural residents; the urbanization rate of the permanent population is 64.35%, an increase of 0.62 percentage points from the end of the previous year. The annual birth rate was 7.65‰; the population death rate was 7.42‰; and the natural growth rate was 0.23‰.

== Transport ==
=== Train ===
- Jiaozuo railway station
- Jiaozuo West station

=== Roads ===
Zhengjiaojin Expressway, Xinjiaoji Expressway, Jiluo Expressway and Jiaowen Expressway pass through the territory. Local expressways are connected with national trunk expressways, realizing "county expressway", "township expressway" and "village expressway". In October 2020, it will be included in the list of pilot areas for deepening the reform of rural road management and maintenance system.

By the end of 2019, the expressway mileage was 239.51 km. The annual highway cargo turnover was 30.25 billion tons per kilometer, up 9.4% over the previous year; Road passenger turnover reached 697 million person kilometers, down 11.8%.

== Education ==
- Henan Polytechnic University (HPU), founded in 1909, it is the earliest mining institute in China.
- Jiaozuo University

== Tourism ==
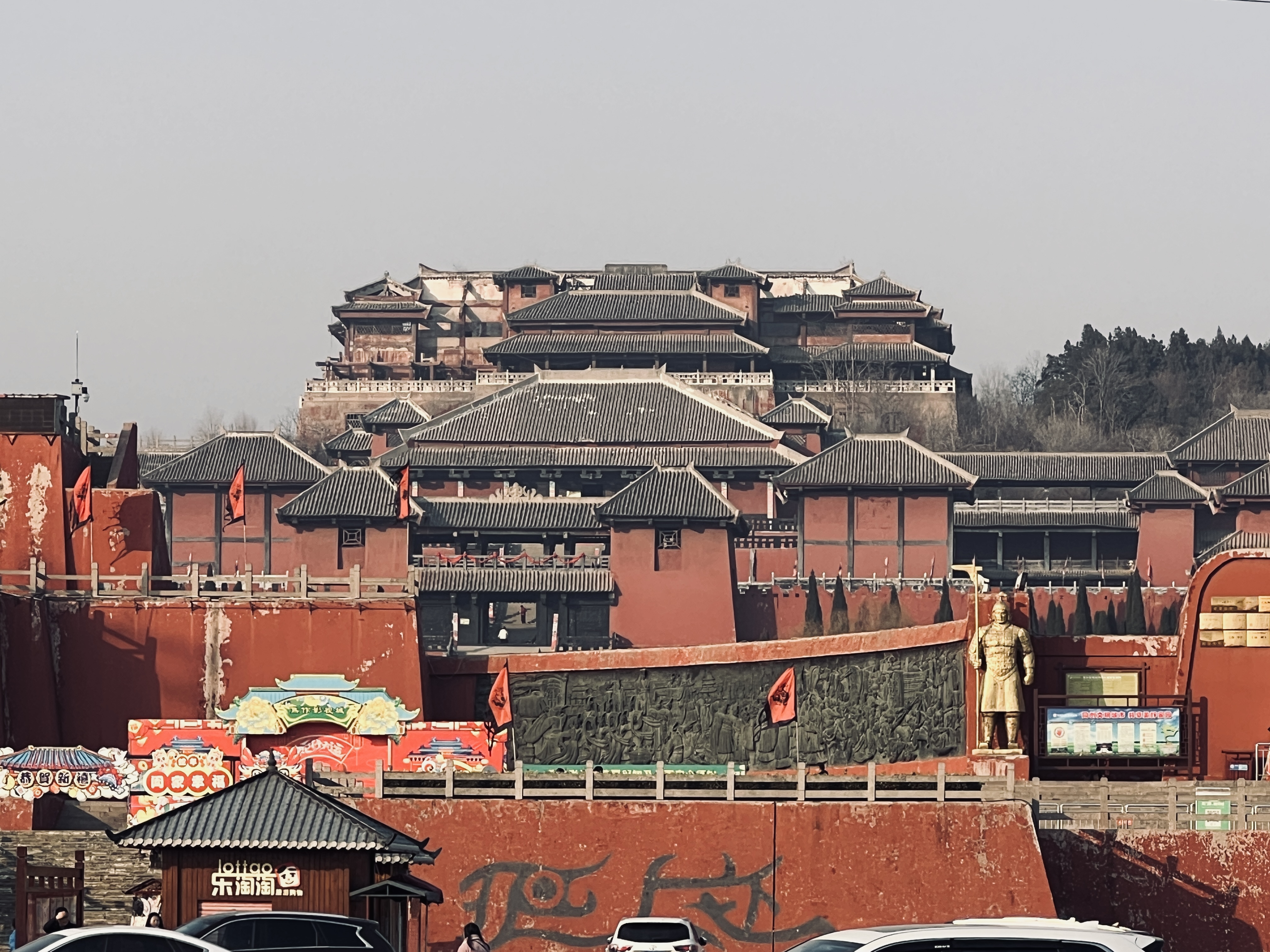
Jiaozuo Film and Television City

=== Urban area ===
- Jiaozuo Museum: Home to the largest collection of Han-dynasty grave goods in China, offering insight into ancient Chinese architectural styles.
- Jiaozuo Film and Television City: Located in the north of the city, this complex of imitation ancient buildings is modeled on early Chinese architecture and has served as a filming location for productions such as Three Kingdoms.
- Longyuan Lake Park (龙源湖公园): A lake in the city center, featuring the sculpture "Kuafu Chasing the Sun" and a 238-meter-tall TV Tower.
- Fengshanzhen (缝山针): Located in the north of the city, this mining park was converted from an abandoned quarry. The huge "Needle" sculpture on the mountaintop symbolizes "Sewing up the wounds of the land."

=== Administrative region ===
- Yuntai Mountain: Known for its 314-meter waterfall drop, cliffside cliff walkways, and twin-opening waterfall.
- Sansheng Pagoda of Tianning Temple: A 13-story multi-eaved brick pagoda built in 1171 during the Jin dynasty.
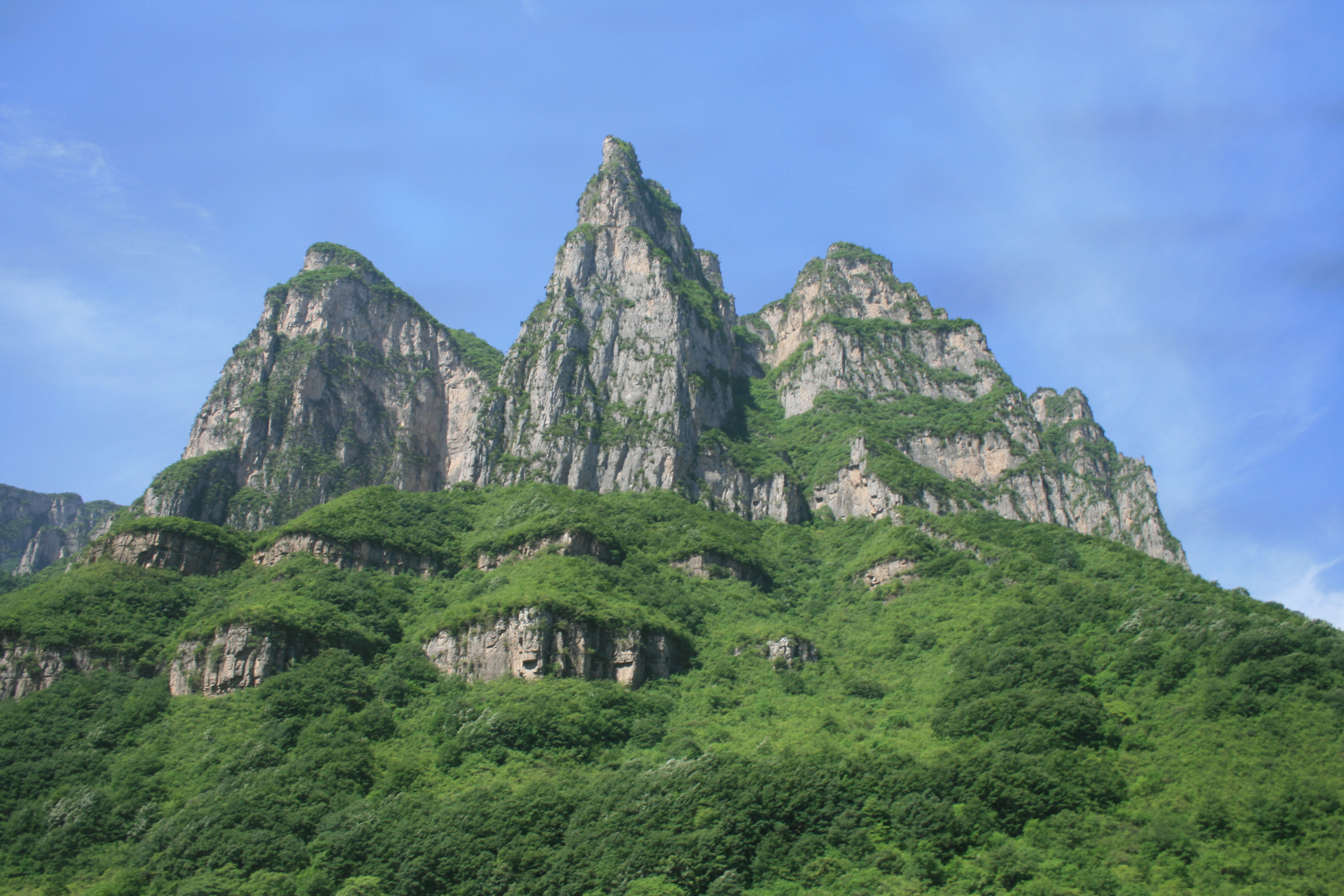
Yuntaishan

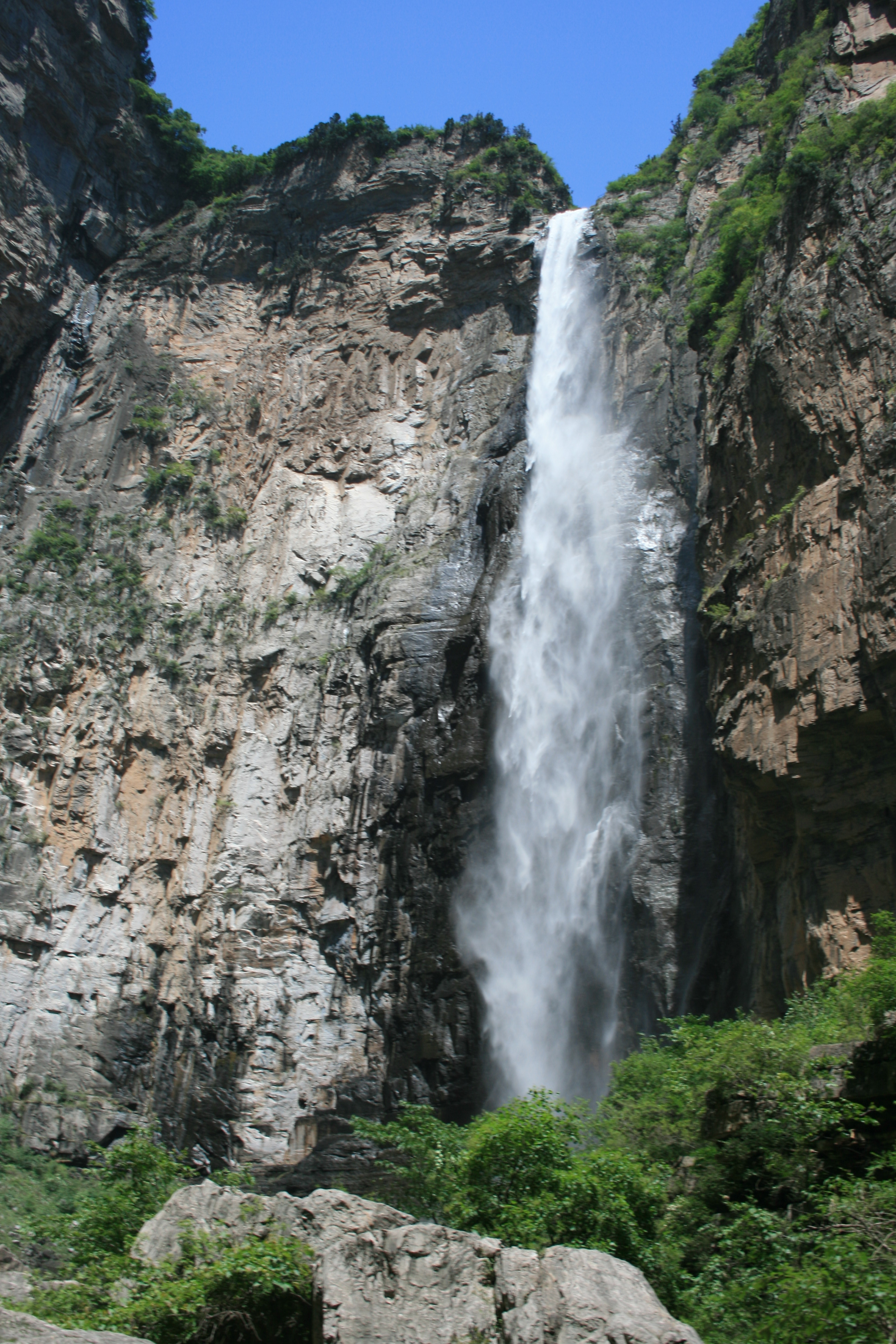
Yuntaishan Waterfall

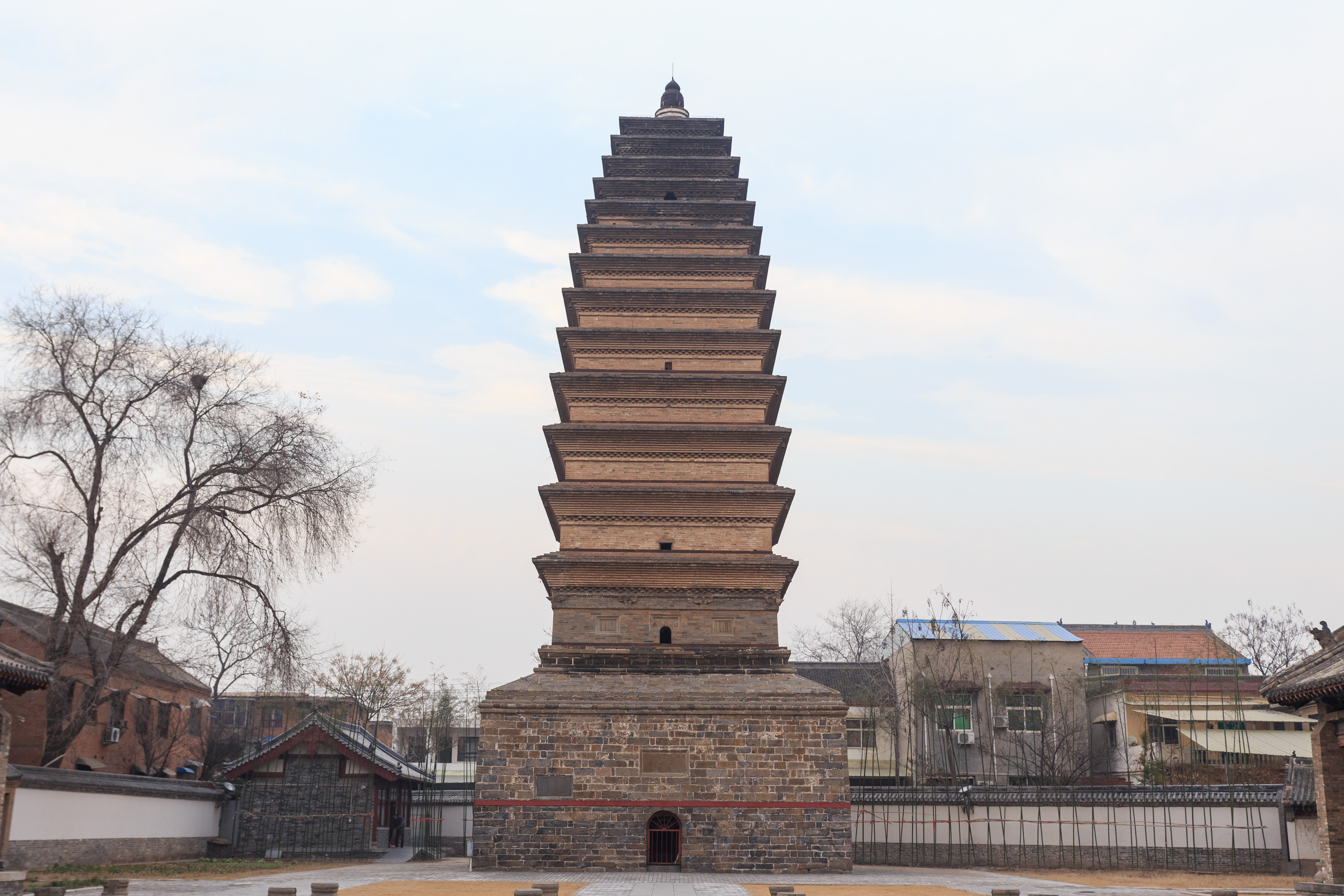
Pagoda of Tryadhva Buddhas

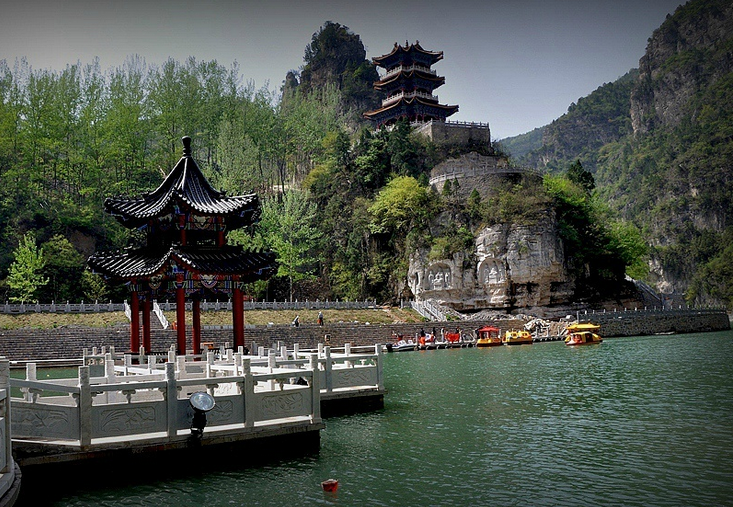
Taiping hanging temple

Jiaozuo TV Tower

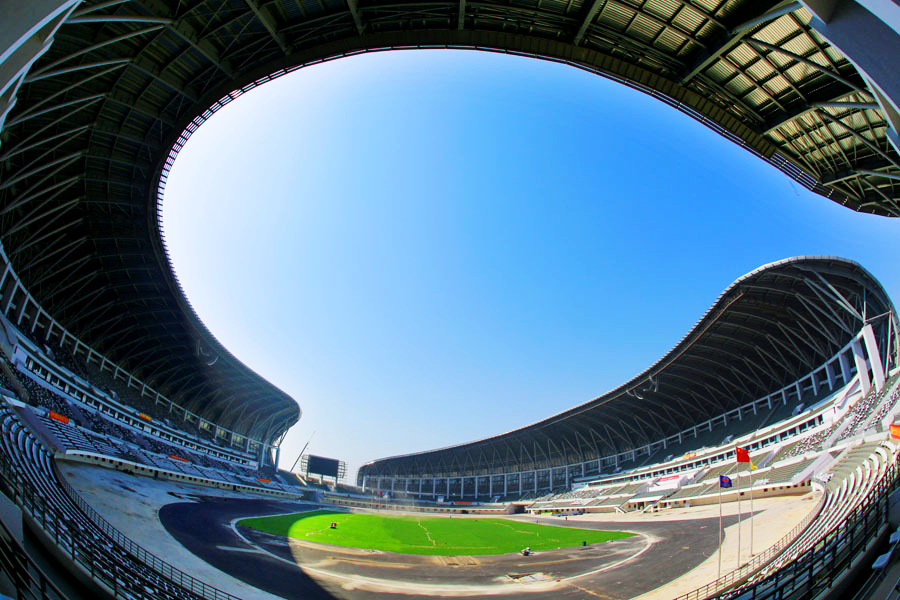
Jiaozuo Sport centre

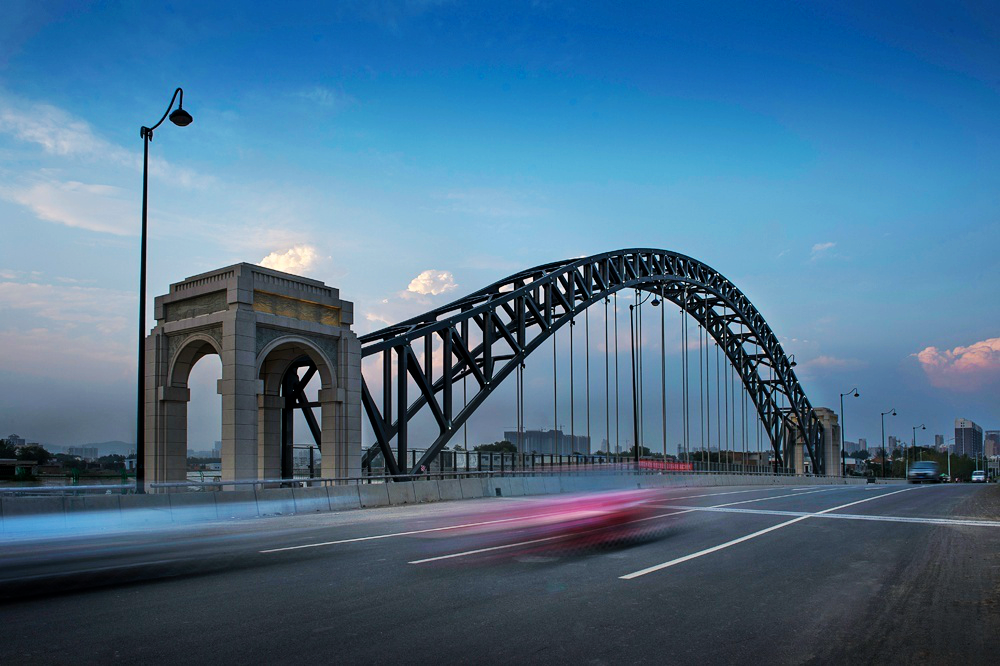
Renmin bridge

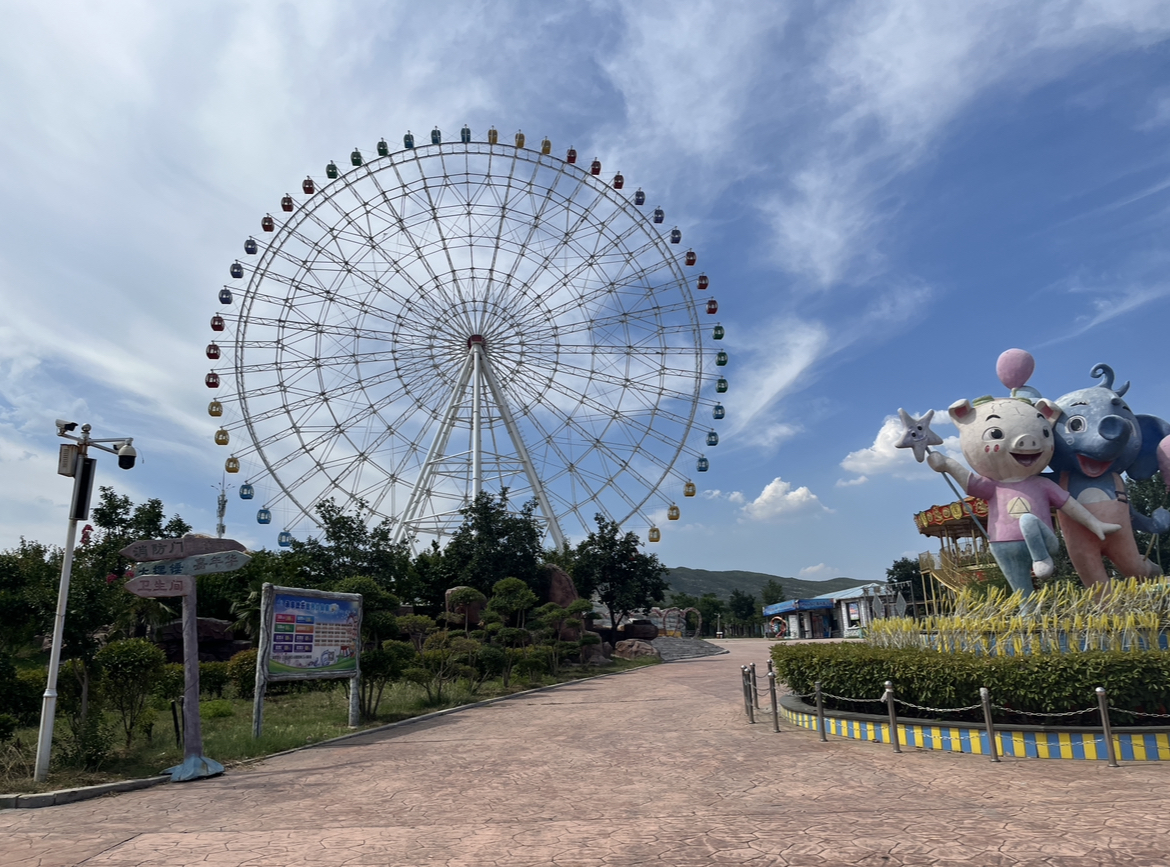
Jiaozuo Playground Ferris Wheel

== Notable people ==
- Sima Yi, the founder of the Jin dynasty (266–420).
- Han Yu, Ancient Chinese writer, poet and essayist.
- Li Shangyin, poets of the Tang dynasty.
- Chen Wangting, founder of Chen-style taijiquan.
- Guo Xi, courtesy name Chunfu, was a native of Xiguozuo Village, Yuecun Township, Wen County. He was a painter and painting theorist of the Northern Song dynasty.
