= Qin River (Shanxi) =

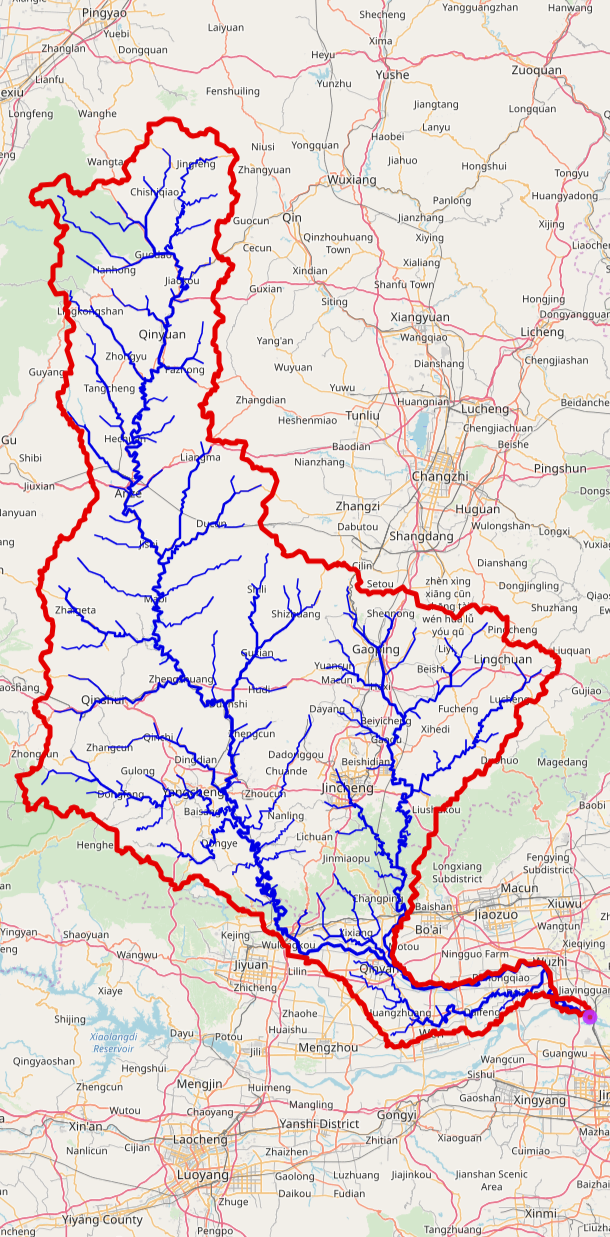
- Qin river basin
- Native name: Qin He (Chinese)

Location
- Country: China

Physical characteristics
- Source
  - location: Qinyuan county, Shanxi
- Mouth
  - location: Yellow River, in Wuzhi county, Henan
  - coordinates: 34°58′30″N 113°31′8″E
- Length: 485 km (301 mi)
- Basin size: 13,500 km^{2} (5,200 sq mi)

Qin River
- Chinese: 沁河
Transcriptions
Standard Mandarin
- Hanyu Pinyin: Qìnhé
- Wade–Giles: Ch‘in Ho

The Qin River (Chinese: 沁河) is a tributary of the Yellow River in southeast Shanxi, China. It rises in Qinyuan County, Shanxi, and joins the Yellow River in Wuzhi County, Henan. The river is 485 km (301 mi) long and has a catchment area of 13,500 km^{2} (5,200 sq mi).

Its largest tributary is the Dan River (丹河), which flows through the Gaoping city center. The upper Dan River valley northwest of Gaoping is the site of the ancient battlefields of the infamous Battle of Changping.
