= Wenfeng Pagoda in Anyang =

Pagoda in Anyang, China

Tianning Temple Pagoda Wenfeng Pagoda
- 天宁寺塔 / 文峰塔
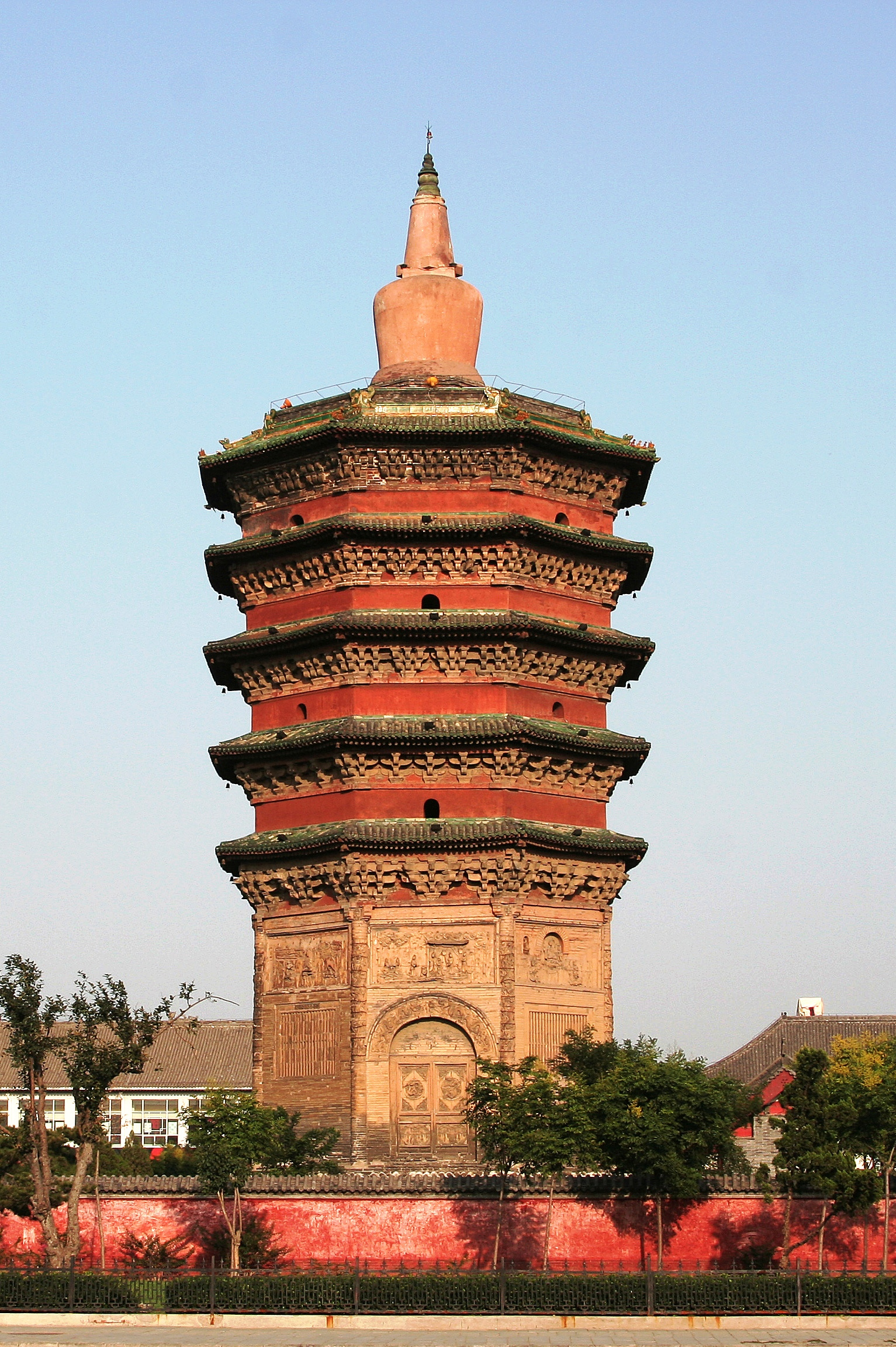
- Wenfeng Pagoda, notable for its inverted shape.

Religion
- Affiliation: Buddhism, Confucianism, Chinese folk religion
- District: Wenfeng District
- Governing body: Anyang Cultural Relics Bureau

Location
- Location: Dasi Qianjie, Anyang, Henan
- Country: China
- Interactive map of Tianning Temple Pagoda; Wenfeng Pagoda
- Coordinates: 36°05′52.969″N 114°20′36.496″E

Architecture
- Type: Pagoda
- Style: Chinese / Tibetan hybrid
- Founder: (Originally) Tianning Temple monks
- Established: 952 CE (Later Zhou dynasty)
- Completed: 952 (major rebuilt in later dynasties)

Specifications
- Height (max): 38.65 m (126.8 ft)
- Materials: Brick

Wenfeng Pagoda, originally known as Tianning Temple Pagoda, is a Buddhist pagoda located in Anyang, Henan Province, China. Built in 952 CE during the Later Zhou dynasty, it is renowned for its rare inverted architectural design, where the upper levels are wider than the base. The pagoda combines Chinese and Tibetan architectural elements and features intricate Buddhist carvings. It was designated a Provincial Cultural Heritage Site and underwent major restorations in the 18th century and modern era.

== History ==
The Tianning Temple was first constructed during the Sui dynasty (601–604 CE). The current brick structure dates to 952 CE, built under the Later Zhou dynasty. Over the centuries, it was repaired during the Yuan, Ming, and Qing dynasties.

In 1772, the local prefect Huang Bangning led a major restoration and inscribed "文峰耸秀" ("Wenfeng Soaring in Elegance") on its southern gate, linking it symbolically to the nearby Confucian Temple. This act officially renamed it Wenfeng Pagoda. Since 1949, the Chinese government has conducted two large-scale renovations to preserve the structure.

== Architecture ==
Standing 38.65 meters tall, the Wenfeng Pagoda exhibits an inverted silhouette that distinguishes it from ordinary pagoda designs. Its structure gradually widens as it ascends, culminating in a striking Tibetan-style stupa finial added during the Qing dynasty. The pagoda's base features a seven-layer lotus pedestal, while its five octagonal tiers display progressively broader eaves.

The exterior showcases exquisite craftsmanship, with all but the southern entrance being decorative false doors adorned with intricate "Two Dragons Playing with a Pearl" carvings. Eight elaborate brick relief panels depict significant Buddhist narratives, including scenes of Shakyamuni's birth, his attainment of Nirvana, and the benevolent Guanyin accompanied by attendants.

Structural ingenuity is evident in the staggered placement of ventilation windows, a design solution that prevents stress cracks in the masonry. Inside, a steep ascent of 72 steps leads visitors to a narrow viewing platform at the summit. The pagoda's construction primarily utilizes brick and wood, enhanced with glazed tiles and iron reinforcements. Traditional wind chimes suspended from each eave produce melodic tones when caressed by the breeze, adding an auditory dimension to the architectural experience.
