= S87 Zhengzhou–Yuntaishan Expressway =

Road in Henan, China

Zhengzhou–Yuntaishan Expressway
- Zhengyun Expressway 郑云高速公路
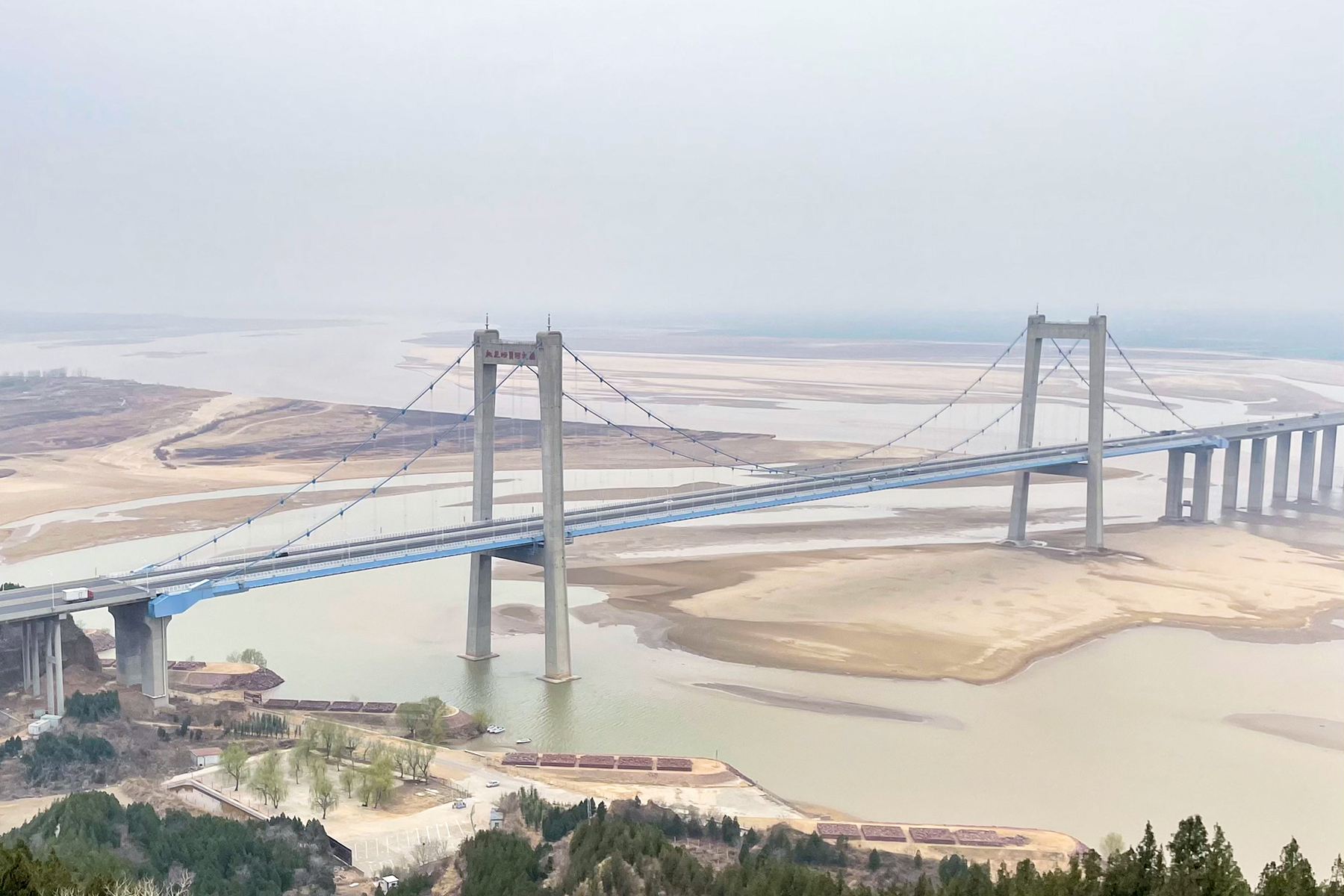
- Taohuayu Yellow River Bridge

Route information
- Length: 65.5 km (40.7 mi)
- Existed: 2013–present

Major junctions
- South end: G30 / G3001 in Xingyang Zhengzhou, Henan
- G5512 in Wuzhi County, Jiaozuo; G3511 in Xiuwu County, Jiaozuo
- North end: Henan S307 in Xiuwu County, Jiaozuo, Henan

Location
- Country: China
- Province: Henan

Highway system
- Transport in China

The Zhengzhou–Yuntaishan Expressway (Chinese: 郑州－云台山高速公路), abbreviated as Zhengyun Expressway (Chinese: 郑云高速) and designated as S87 in Henan's expressway system, is 65.5-kilometre (40.7 mi) long regional expressway in Henan, China. The expressway connects Zhengzhou, the capital of Henan province, and the famous scenic area of Yuntai Mountain (Yuntaishan).

== History ==
The expressway was completed in two phases. The first phase (Zhengzhou–Wuzhi) and was completed in 2013 and the second phase (Wuzhi–Yuntaishan) was completed in 2016.

== Route ==
The S87 Zhengzhou–Yuntaishan Expressway starts at Guangwu Interchange (intersecting with G30 and G3001) in Guangwu Town, Xingyang, Zhengzhou. It runs north as a six-lane expressway, crossing the Yellow River at Taohuayu Yellow River Bridge. After intersecting with G5512 in Wuzhi County, it heads north as a four-lane expressway, and then intersects G3511 in Xiuwu County. The expressway continues north and ends at Henan Provincial Highway S307, close to Yuntai Mountain Scenic Area.

== Exit list ==
| Location | km | mi | Exit | Name | Destinations | Notes |
Henan S87 (Zhengzhou–Yuntaishan Expressway)
Continues south as G3001
| Xingyang, Zhengzhou | | | 1 | Guangwu Interchange | G30 / G3001 – Luoyang, Kaifeng, other destinations in Zhengzhou | Southern terminus; continues south as G3001 |
| Xingyang, Zhengzhou | | | 3 | Guangwu | Dahe Road – Guangwu Town, Guxing Town | |
| Xingyang, Zhengzhou | Taohuayu Parking Area | | | | | |
| Wuzhi County, Jiaozuo | | | 23 | Jiayingguan | G327 – Wuzhi | |
| Wuzhi County, Jiaozuo | | | 27 | G5512 – Yuanyang, Jiaozuo, Jincheng | | |
| Xiuwu County, Jiaozuo | | | | G3511 – Xinxiang, Heze, Jiyuan, Baoji | | |
| Xiuwu County, Jiaozuo | | | | Xiuwu Urban Area | Jiankang E. Road – Xiuwu | |
| Xiuwu County, Jiaozuo | Yuntaishan Toll Station | | | | | |
| Xiuwu County, Jiaozuo | Yuntaishan Service Area | | | | | |
| Xiuwu County, Jiaozuo | | | | Yuntaishan | Henan S307 – Yuntai Mountain | Northern terminus |
Closed/former; Concurrency terminus; HOV only; Incomplete access; Tolled; Route transition; Unopened
