= Yuntai =

Yuntai (simplified Chinese: 云台; traditional Chinese: 雲台; pinyin: yún tái) may refer to:

Places

- Cloud Platform at Juyongguan (Juyongguan Yuntai), a Buddhist structure in Beijing
- Yuntai Mountain
  - Yuntai Mountain (Henan), a mountain near Jiaozuo, Henan
  - Yuntai Mountain (Jiangsu), a mountain near Lianyungang, Jiangsu
- Yuntai Road Station, a station on Line 7 of the Shanghai Metro

Other

- Yuntai 28 generals, 28 generals of the Later Han whose portraits were hung at the South Palace tower in Luoyang
