= S87 =

S87 may refer to:

- HMS Turbulent (S87), a submarine of the Royal Navy
- S87 Zhengzhou–Yuntaishan Expressway, China
