= G5512 Jincheng–Xinxiang Expressway =

Expressway in China

Jincheng–Xinxiang Expressway
- 晋城－新乡高速公路
- Jinxin Expressway 晋新高速公路

Route information
- Auxiliary route of G55
- Existed: 2007–present

Major junctions
- West end: China National Highway 207 and East Fengtai Street, Jincheng, Shanxi
- East end: G4 Beijing–Hong Kong and Macau Expressway, S28 Changyuan–Jiyuan Expressway, Xinxiang, Henan

Location
- Country: China

Highway system
- National Trunk Highway System; Primary; Auxiliary; National Highways; Transport in China
← G5511	→ G5513

The G5512 Jincheng–Xinxiang Expressway (Chinese: 晋城—新乡高速公路), commonly referred to as the Jinxin Expressway (Chinese: 晋新高速公路), is an expressway in China that connects Jincheng, Shanxi and Xinxiang, Henan. The expressway is a spur of G55 Erenhot–Guangzhou Expressway.
