= G5511 Jining–Arun Banner Expressway =

Expressway in Inner Mongolia, China

Jining–Arun Banner Expressway
- 集宁－阿荣旗高速公路
- Ji'a Expressway 集阿高速公路

Route information
- Auxiliary route of G55

Major junctions
- Southwest end: Jining District, Ulanqab, Inner Mongolia
- Northeast end: Arun Banner, Hulunbuir, Inner Mongolia

Location
- Country: China

Highway system
- National Trunk Highway System; Primary; Auxiliary; National Highways; Transport in China
← G55	→ G5512

The G5511 Jining–Arun Banner Expressway (Chinese: 集宁—阿荣旗高速公路), commonly referred to as the Ji'a Expressway (Chinese: 集阿高速公路), is a planned expressway that will connect Arun Banner, Hulunbuir, Inner Mongolia, China, and Jining District, Ulanqab, Inner Mongolia. The expressway is a spur of G55 Erenhot–Guangzhou Expressway and will be completely in Inner Mongolia. The expressway is currently partly opened for 3 sections.
