= Xunyi County =

Xunyi County 旬邑县 Sunyi
- County
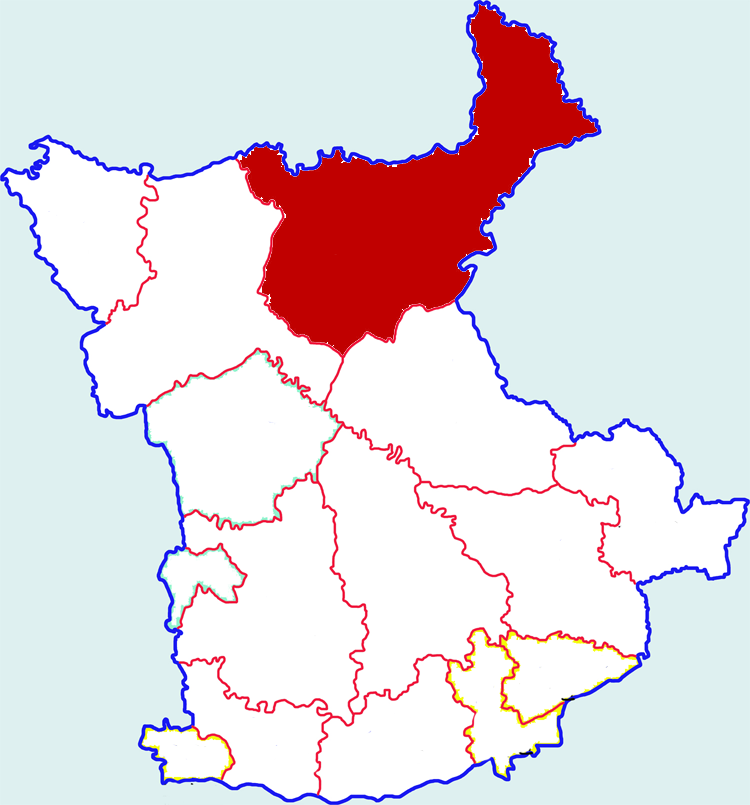
- Xunyi in Xianyang

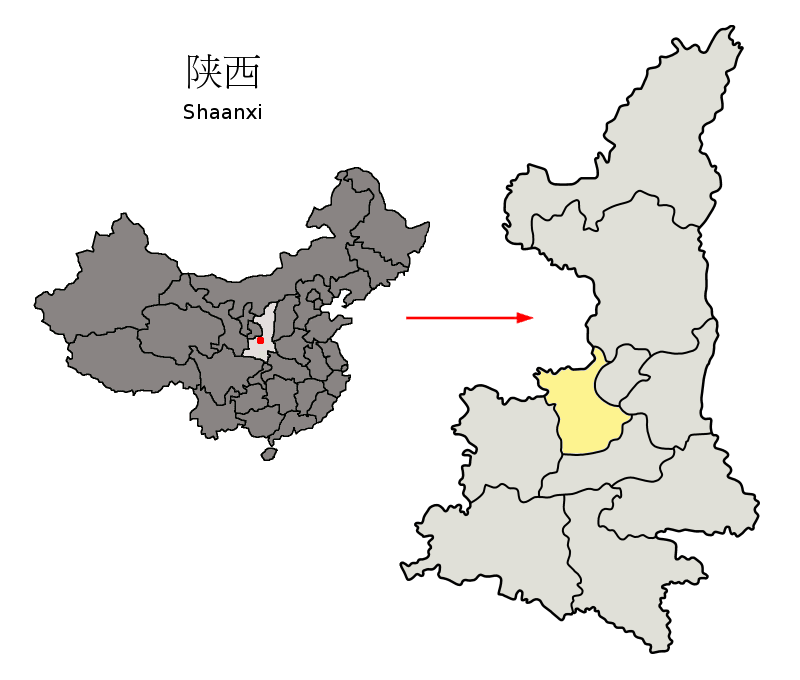
- Xianyang in Shaanxi
- Coordinates: 35°06′43″N 108°20′24″E
- Country: People's Republic of China
- Province: Shaanxi
- Prefecture-level city: Xianyang

Area
  - Total: 1,811 km^{2} (699 sq mi)
- Highest elevation: 1,855 m (6,086 ft)
- Lowest elevation: 850 m (2,790 ft)

Population (2019)
  - Total: 296,000
  - Density: 163/km^{2} (423/sq mi)
- Time zone: UTC+8 (China standard time)
- Postal code: 711300
- Area code: (0)29
- Licence plates: 陕D
- Website: www.snxunyi.gov.cn

Xunyi (Chinese: 旬邑; pinyin: Xúnyì) is a county in the central part of Shaanxi province, China, bordering Gansu province to the north and northwest. It is the northernmost county-level division of Xianyang City. The county is noted for its apple orchards producing the "Malan Red", a variety of red Fuji apple named after the Malan Red Army site. Besides apples, the economy relies on coal and petroleum exploitation.

Present day Xunyi is located at the same location as the historic Bin city. Xunyi is also home to the 53 m (174 ft) Xunyi Pagoda, built in 1059.

The county was one of the communist strongholds during the Long March.

== Administrative divisions ==
As of 2020, Xunyi is divided into 9 towns and 1 subdistrict.

Towns

- Chengguan Subdistrict (城关街道)
- Tuqiao (土桥镇)
- Zhitian (职田镇)
- Zhanghong (张洪镇)
- Taicun (太村镇)
- Zhengjia (郑家镇)
- Jiapoutou (湫坡头镇)
- Dimiao (底庙镇)
- Malan (马栏镇)
- Qingyuan (清塬镇)

== Climate ==
Climate data for Xunyi, elevation 1,277 m (4,190 ft), (1991–2020 normals, extremes 1981–2010)
Month	Jan	Feb	Mar	Apr	May	Jun	Jul	Aug	Sep	Oct	Nov	Dec	Year
Record high °C (°F)	14.9 (58.8)	20.7 (69.3)	26.5 (79.7)	32.7 (90.9)	33.2 (91.8)	35.2 (95.4)	35.7 (96.3)	34.3 (93.7)	35.0 (95.0)	27.0 (80.6)	21.1 (70.0)	17.1 (62.8)	35.7 (96.3)
Mean daily maximum °C (°F)	1.8 (35.2)	5.5 (41.9)	11.5 (52.7)	18.2 (64.8)	22.4 (72.3)	26.2 (79.2)	27.4 (81.3)	25.7 (78.3)	21.0 (69.8)	15.4 (59.7)	9.2 (48.6)	3.4 (38.1)	15.6 (60.2)
Daily mean °C (°F)	−4.7 (23.5)	−0.9 (30.4)	4.9 (40.8)	11.4 (52.5)	16.0 (60.8)	20.1 (68.2)	21.9 (71.4)	20.2 (68.4)	15.3 (59.5)	9.1 (48.4)	2.6 (36.7)	−3.0 (26.6)	9.4 (48.9)
Mean daily minimum °C (°F)	−9.9 (14.2)	−5.7 (21.7)	−0.4 (31.3)	4.8 (40.6)	9.3 (48.7)	13.7 (56.7)	16.6 (61.9)	15.6 (60.1)	10.8 (51.4)	4.4 (39.9)	−2.2 (28.0)	−7.9 (17.8)	4.1 (39.4)
Record low °C (°F)	−24.9 (−12.8)	−22.7 (−8.9)	−13.6 (7.5)	−6.1 (21.0)	−2.9 (26.8)	3.7 (38.7)	8.7 (47.7)	4.4 (39.9)	0.4 (32.7)	−8.5 (16.7)	−21.0 (−5.8)	−28.2 (−18.8)	−28.2 (−18.8)
Average precipitation mm (inches)	8.9 (0.35)	11.2 (0.44)	20.8 (0.82)	36.0 (1.42)	52.4 (2.06)	73.8 (2.91)	103.0 (4.06)	110.6 (4.35)	95.4 (3.76)	51.4 (2.02)	19.5 (0.77)	6.0 (0.24)	589 (23.2)
Average precipitation days (≥ 0.1 mm)	5.2	5.8	7.1	8.1	10.0	10.5	12.3	12.4	12.2	9.9	6.0	3.6	103.1
Average snowy days	6.2	6.4	4.4	0.8	0	0	0	0	0	0.5	3.3	4.5	26.1
Average relative humidity (%)	59	61	59	58	61	66	76	82	82	79	71	61	68
Mean monthly sunshine hours	174.7	163.6	190.4	218.5	232.0	230.2	227.0	204.3	159.6	159.4	169.4	177.9	2,307
Percentage possible sunshine	56	53	51	55	53	53	52	49	43	46	55	59	52
Source: China Meteorological Administration

== Transportation ==
- G69 Yinchuan–Baise Expressway
- G3511 Heze–Baoji Expressway (under construction as of January 2020)
- China National Highway 211
