= G3511 Heze–Baoji Expressway =

Road in China

Heze–Baoji Expressway
- 菏泽－宝鸡高速公路
- Hebao Expressway 菏宝高速公路

Route information
- Auxiliary route of G35

Major junctions
- West end: G85 in Fengxiang District, Baoji, Shaanxi
- East end: G1511 in Mudan District, Heze, Shandong

Location
- Country: China

Highway system
- National Trunk Highway System; Primary; Auxiliary; National Highways; Transport in China
| ← G35 | → G3512 |

The G3511 Heze–Baoji Expressway (Chinese: 菏泽—宝鸡高速公路), also referred to as the Hebao Expressway (Chinese: 菏宝高速公路), is an expressway in China that connects the cities of Heze, Shandong to Baoji, Shaanxi.

== Route ==
The route travels through the provinces of Henan, Shanxi, Shaanxi and Shandong.

=== Shandong ===
In Shandong the expressway passes through Mudan District and Dongming County.

=== Henan ===
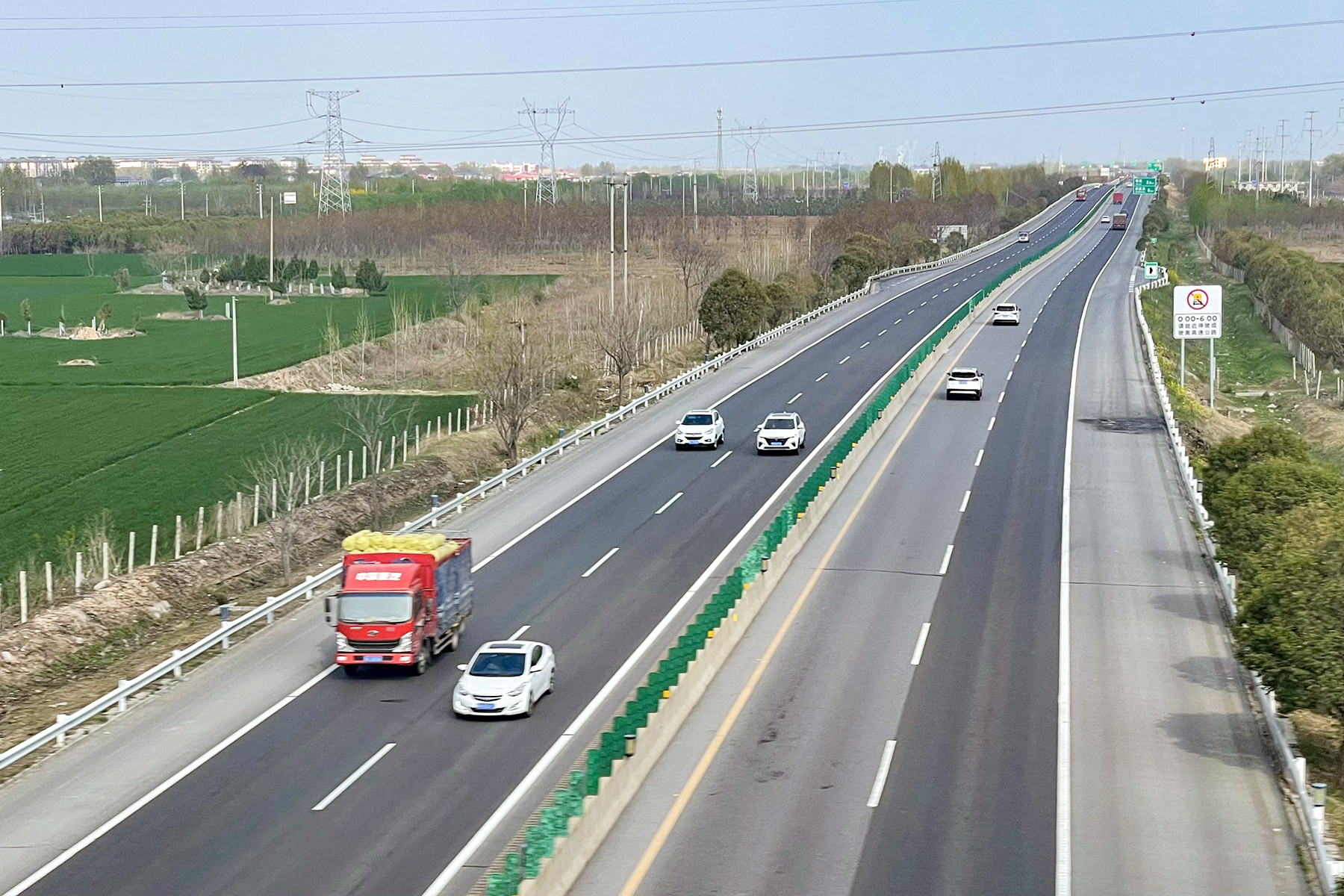
Hebao Expressway in Xiuwu County, Henan

In Henan the expressway passes through Changyuan, Xinxiang County, Huojia County, Xiuwu County, Jiaozuo, Bo'ai County, Qinyang and Jiyuan.

=== Shanxi ===
In Shanxi the expressway passes through Yuanqu County, Jiang County, Wenxi County, Jishan County, Wanrong County and Linyi County.

=== Shaanxi ===
In Shaanxi the expressway passes through Heyang County, Chengcheng County, Baishui County, Yintai District, Wangyi District, Yaozhou District, Xunyi County, Binzhou, Linyou County and Fengxiang District.
