= G55 Erenhot–Guangzhou Expressway =

Expressway in China

Erenhot–Guangzhou Expressway
- 二连浩特－广州高速公路
- Erguang Expwy 二广高速

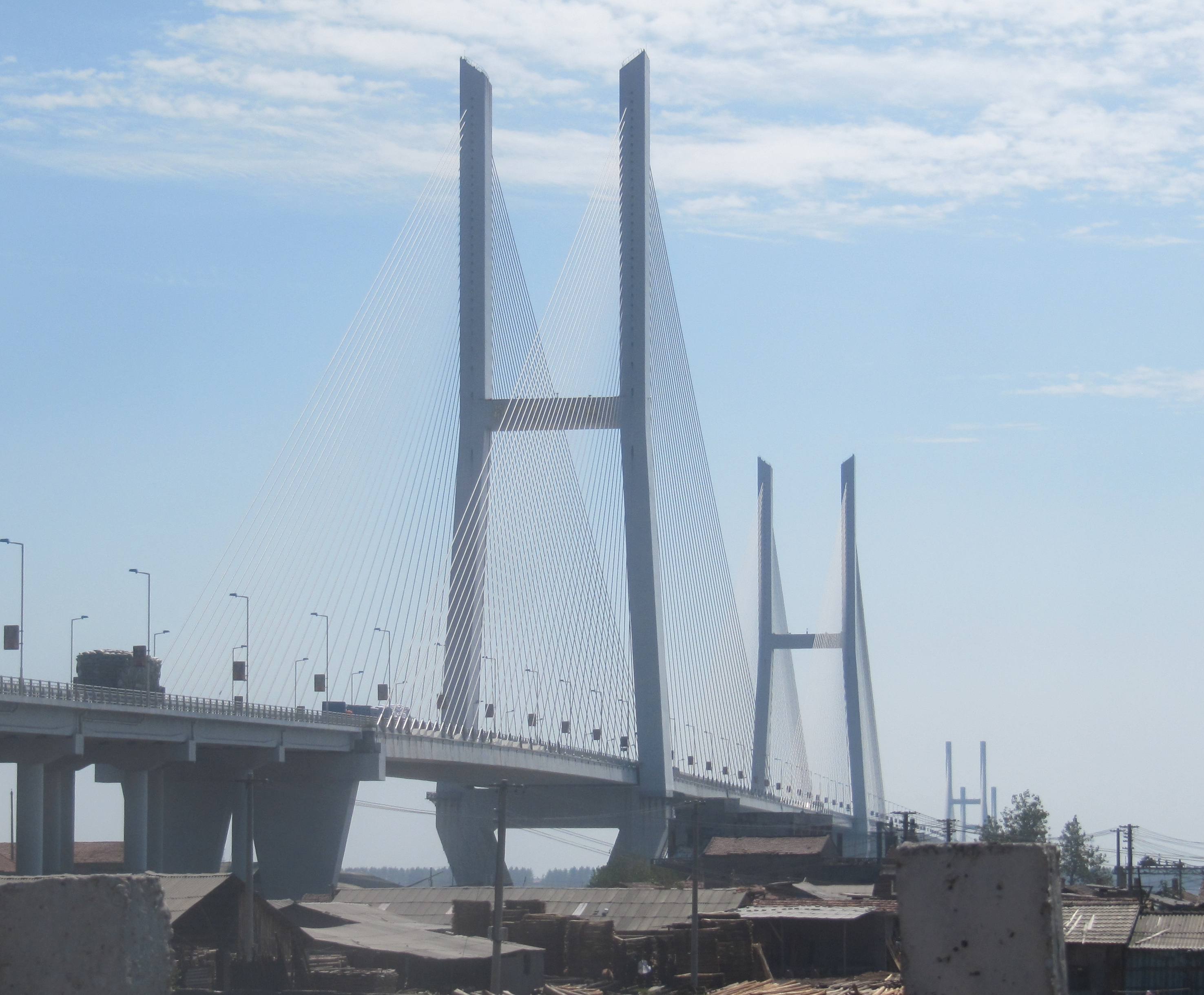
- The G55 crossing the Jingzhou Yangtze River Bridge in Hubei province

Route information
- Part of AH3
- Length: 2,685 km (1,668 mi)

Major junctions
- North end: Erenhot, Xilin Gol League, Inner Mongolia
- South end: G1501 Guangzhou Ring Expressway, S55 Erenhot–Guangzhou Expressway Guangzhou Spur Line, Guangzhou, Guangdong

Location
- Country: China

Highway system
- National Trunk Highway System; Primary; Auxiliary; National Highways; Transport in China
← G5021	→ G5511

The Erenhot–Guangzhou Expressway (Chinese: 二连浩特—广州高速公路), designated as G55 and commonly referred to as the Erguang Expressway (Chinese: 二广高速公路) is an expressway in China that connects the cities of Erenhot, Inner Mongolia, and Guangzhou, Guangdong. When fully complete, it will be 2,685 km (1,668 mi) in length.

== Route ==
=== Inner Mongolia ===
Erenhot, the northern terminus of the expressway, is a border town with Mongolia and has a border checkpoint. The expressway goes from Erenhot through Baiyinchagan town in Ulanqab to the Shanxi border.

=== Shanxi ===
The entire portion of the expressway in Shanxi is complete.

=== Henan ===
The entire portion of the expressway in Henan is complete.

=== Hubei ===
The entire portion of the expressway in Hubei is complete except for 3 km (1.9 mi) of expressway to the Hunan border.

In 2000, a cache of Warring States period artifacts was discovered in eastern Wulipu's Zuozhong village during the construction of the Xiang(yang)–Jing(zhou) Highway (襄荆高速公路).

=== Hunan ===
The entire portion of the expressway in Hunan is under construction. This section has been beset by delays and cost overruns.

=== Guangdong ===
The expressway is under construction from the Hunan border to mountainous Huaiji County, Zhaoqing, and complete from Huaiji County to the southern terminus, Guangzhou, capital of Guangdong province.
