= Yuntai Road station =

Shanghai Metro station

Yuntai Road 云台路
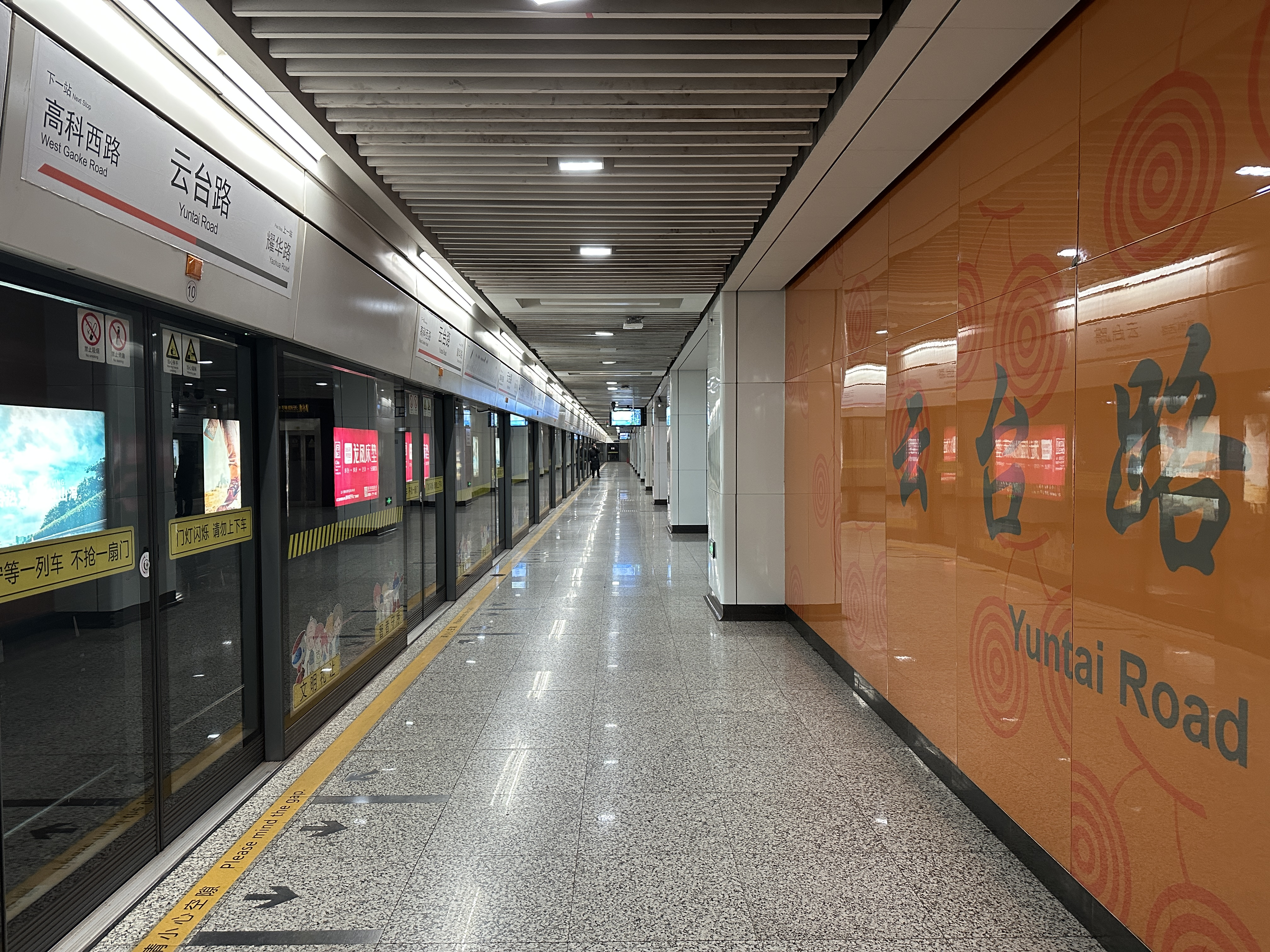
- Station platform

General information
- Location: South Pudong Road and Yuntai Road (云台路), Pudong New Area, Shanghai; China
- Coordinates: 31.1838°N 121.495°E
- Operated by: Shanghai No. 3 Metro Operation Co. Ltd.
- Line: Line 7
- Platforms: 2 (1 island platform)
- Tracks: 2

Construction
- Structure type: Underground
- Accessible: Yes

History
- Opened: December 5, 2009

Services
Preceding station	Shanghai Metro	Following station
Yaohua Road towards Meilan Lake	Line 7	West Gaoke Road towards Huamu Road
Location

Yuntai Road (simplified Chinese: 云台路; traditional Chinese: 雲台路; pinyin: Yúntái Lù) is a station on Line 7 of the Shanghai Metro. It is one of the stations located in the Shanghai Expo 2010 zone.
