= Xiuwu County =

Xiuwu County 修武县 Siuwu
- County
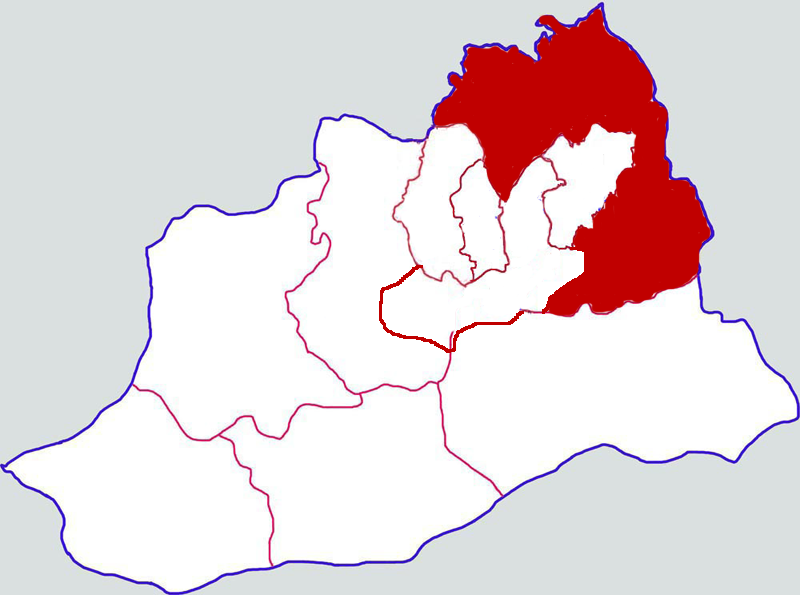
- Xiuwu in Jiaozuo

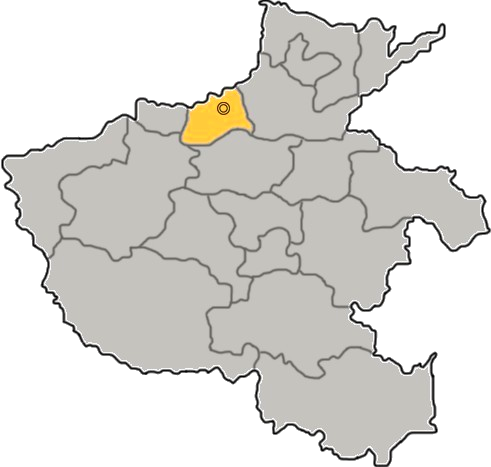
- Jiaozuo in Henan
- Coordinates: 35°13′26″N 113°26′53″E
- Country: People's Republic of China
- Province: Henan
- Prefecture-level city: Jiaozuo

Area
  - Total: 722 km^{2} (279 sq mi)

Population (2019)
  - Total: 257,000
  - Density: 356/km^{2} (922/sq mi)
- Time zone: UTC+8 (China Standard)
- Postal code: 454350

Xiuwu County (Chinese: 修武; pinyin: Xiūwǔ) is a county in the northwest of Henan province, China, bordering Shanxi province to the north. It is under the administration of the prefecture-level city of Jiaozuo and contains its northernmost point.

== Administrative divisions ==
Until 2021, this county has 5 towns, 3 townships and 1 Industry and trade zone.

Towns

- Chengguan (城关镇)
- Huaifeng (郇封镇)
- Qixian Township (七贤镇)
- Zhouzhuang (周庄镇)
- Yuntai Mountain (云台山镇)

Townships

- Wangtun Township (王屯乡)
- Wuliyuan Township (五里源乡)
- Xicun Township (西村乡)

Industry and trade zone

- Xiaoying Industry and trade zone (小营工贸区)

== Climate ==
Climate data for Xiuwu, elevation 83 m (272 ft), (1991–2020 normals, extremes 1981–2010)
Month	Jan	Feb	Mar	Apr	May	Jun	Jul	Aug	Sep	Oct	Nov	Dec	Year
Record high °C (°F)	19.2 (66.6)	23.7 (74.7)	28.7 (83.7)	35.2 (95.4)	38.9 (102.0)	42.6 (108.7)	41.1 (106.0)	38.5 (101.3)	37.4 (99.3)	35.5 (95.9)	27.7 (81.9)	23.2 (73.8)	42.6 (108.7)
Mean daily maximum °C (°F)	5.6 (42.1)	9.5 (49.1)	16.2 (61.2)	22.2 (72.0)	28.4 (83.1)	32.9 (91.2)	32.8 (91.0)	31.4 (88.5)	27.2 (81.0)	22.0 (71.6)	14.1 (57.4)	8.0 (46.4)	20.9 (69.6)
Daily mean °C (°F)	−0.1 (31.8)	3.3 (37.9)	9.8 (49.6)	15.5 (59.9)	21.7 (71.1)	26.3 (79.3)	27.5 (81.5)	26.1 (79.0)	21.1 (70.0)	15.5 (59.9)	8.1 (46.6)	2.1 (35.8)	14.7 (58.5)
Mean daily minimum °C (°F)	−4.7 (23.5)	−1.5 (29.3)	4.1 (39.4)	9.3 (48.7)	15.2 (59.4)	20.0 (68.0)	22.9 (73.2)	22.0 (71.6)	16.6 (61.9)	10.6 (51.1)	3.3 (37.9)	−2.7 (27.1)	9.6 (49.3)
Record low °C (°F)	−18.1 (−0.6)	−19.9 (−3.8)	−6.1 (21.0)	−1.5 (29.3)	4.0 (39.2)	11.2 (52.2)	16.7 (62.1)	13.0 (55.4)	6.7 (44.1)	−2.3 (27.9)	−11.6 (11.1)	−15.3 (4.5)	−19.9 (−3.8)
Average precipitation mm (inches)	6.6 (0.26)	9.1 (0.36)	15.8 (0.62)	31.8 (1.25)	47.2 (1.86)	71.4 (2.81)	164.5 (6.48)	105.9 (4.17)	61.6 (2.43)	30.6 (1.20)	20.7 (0.81)	5.0 (0.20)	570.2 (22.45)
Average precipitation days (≥ 0.1 mm)	2.9	3.4	4.2	5.2	6.9	7.9	11.0	10.3	8.1	6.5	4.9	2.5	73.8
Average snowy days	3.6	2.8	1.1	0.1	0	0	0	0	0	0	1.0	2.2	10.8
Average relative humidity (%)	61	59	58	64	64	61	77	80	76	69	67	61	66
Mean monthly sunshine hours	112.6	129.4	171.0	199.5	224.5	201.5	171.2	174.3	151.7	152.1	135.5	125.4	1,948.7
Percentage possible sunshine	36	42	46	51	52	47	39	42	41	44	44	41	44
Source: China Meteorological Administration
