= Yuntai Mountain (Henan) =

Mountain in Henan, China

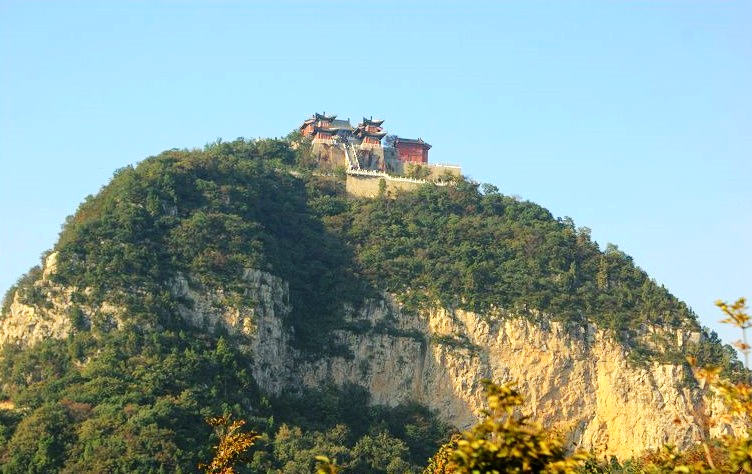

Highest point
- Elevation: 1,308 m (4,291 ft)
- Parent peak: Mount Zhuyu (茱萸峰)
- Coordinates: 35°25′57.46″N 113°21′22.79″E

Geography
- Location within China
- Location: Xiuwu County, Jiaozuo, Henan, China
- Parent range: Taihang Mountains

The Yuntai Mountain (simplified Chinese: 云台山; traditional Chinese: 雲台山; pinyin: Yúntāi shān) is a part of the Taihang Mountains, situated in Xiuwu County, Jiaozuo, Henan Province of People's Republic of China. The Yuntai Geo Park scenic area is classified as a AAAAA scenic area by the China National Tourism Administration.

== Gallery ==
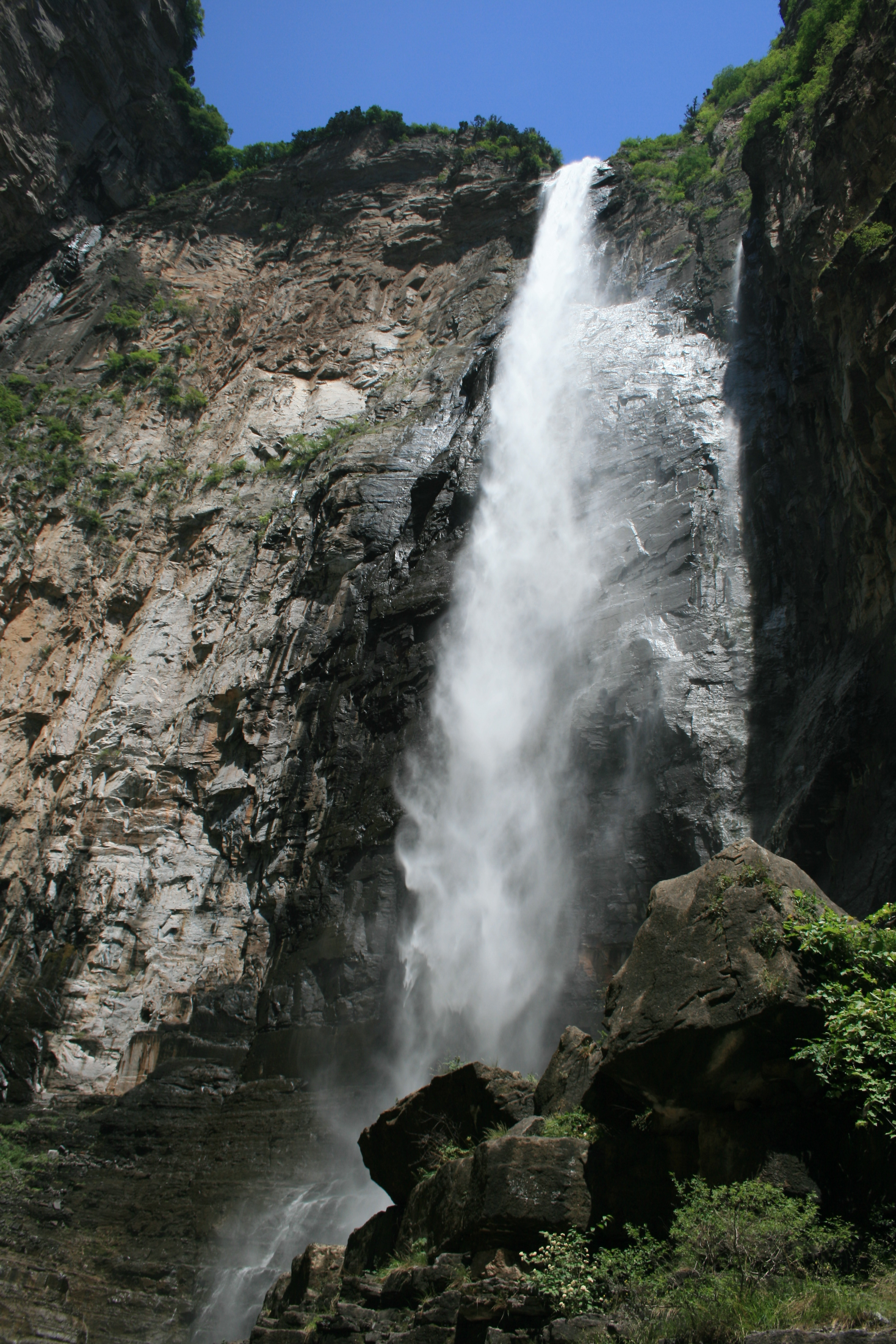

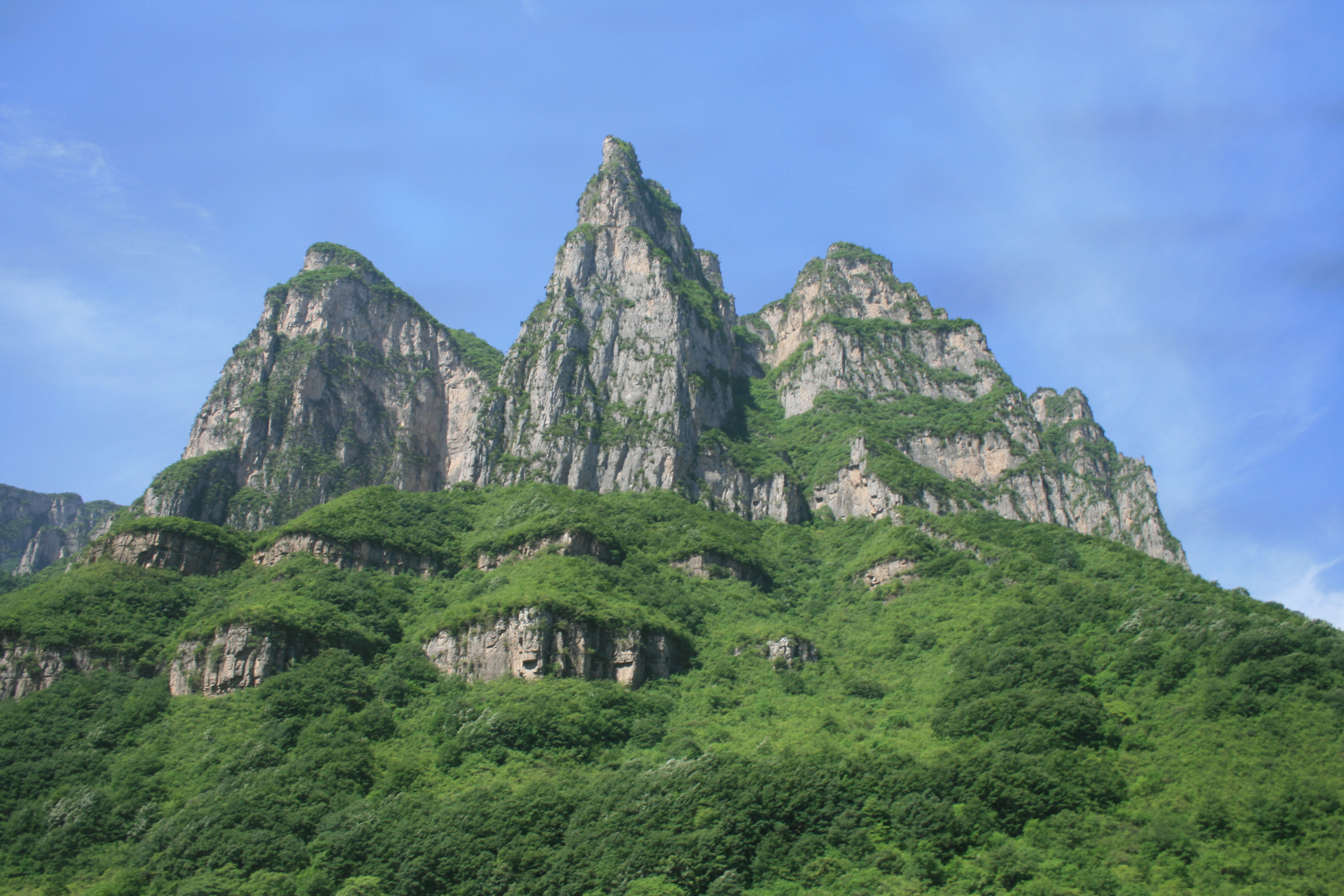

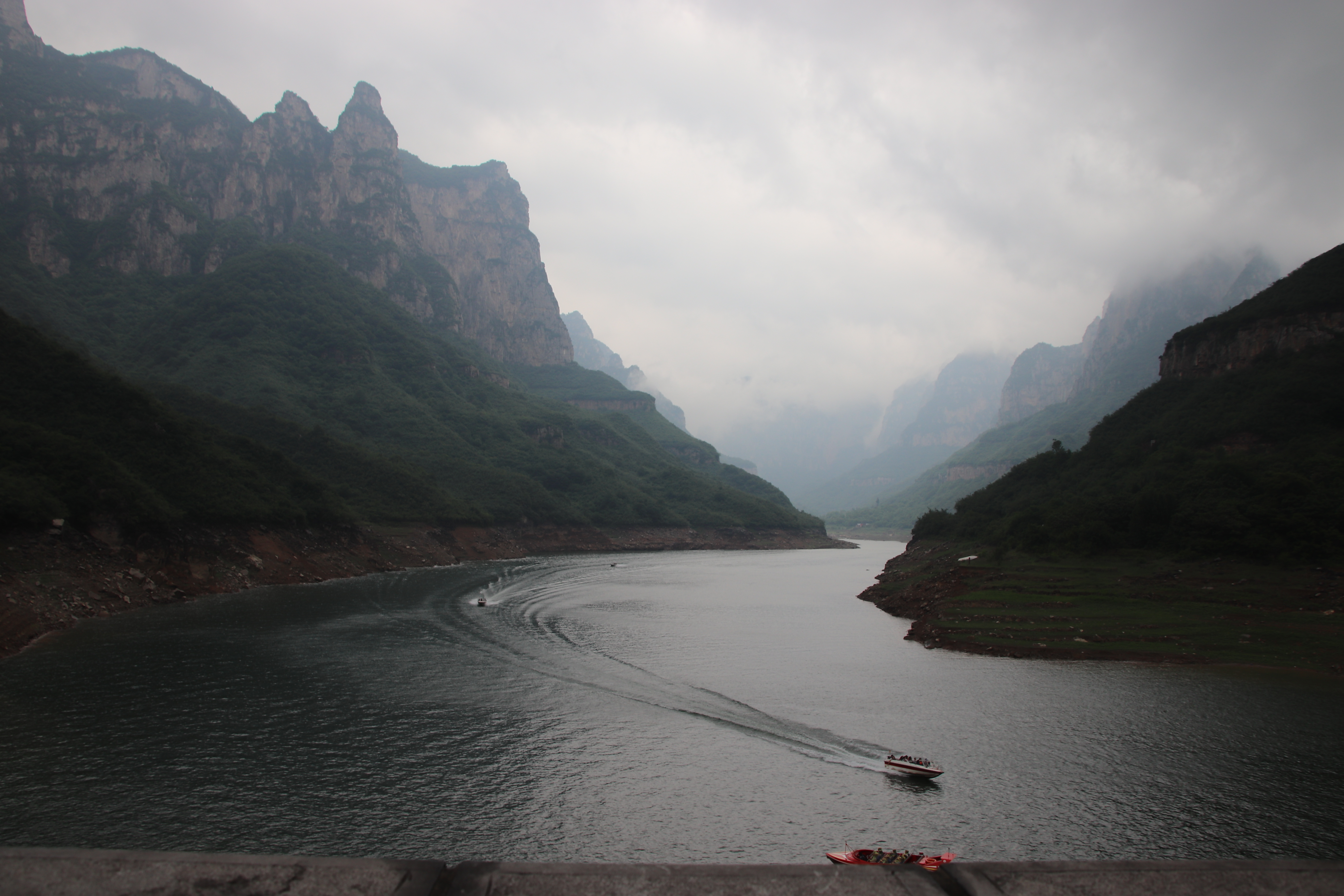

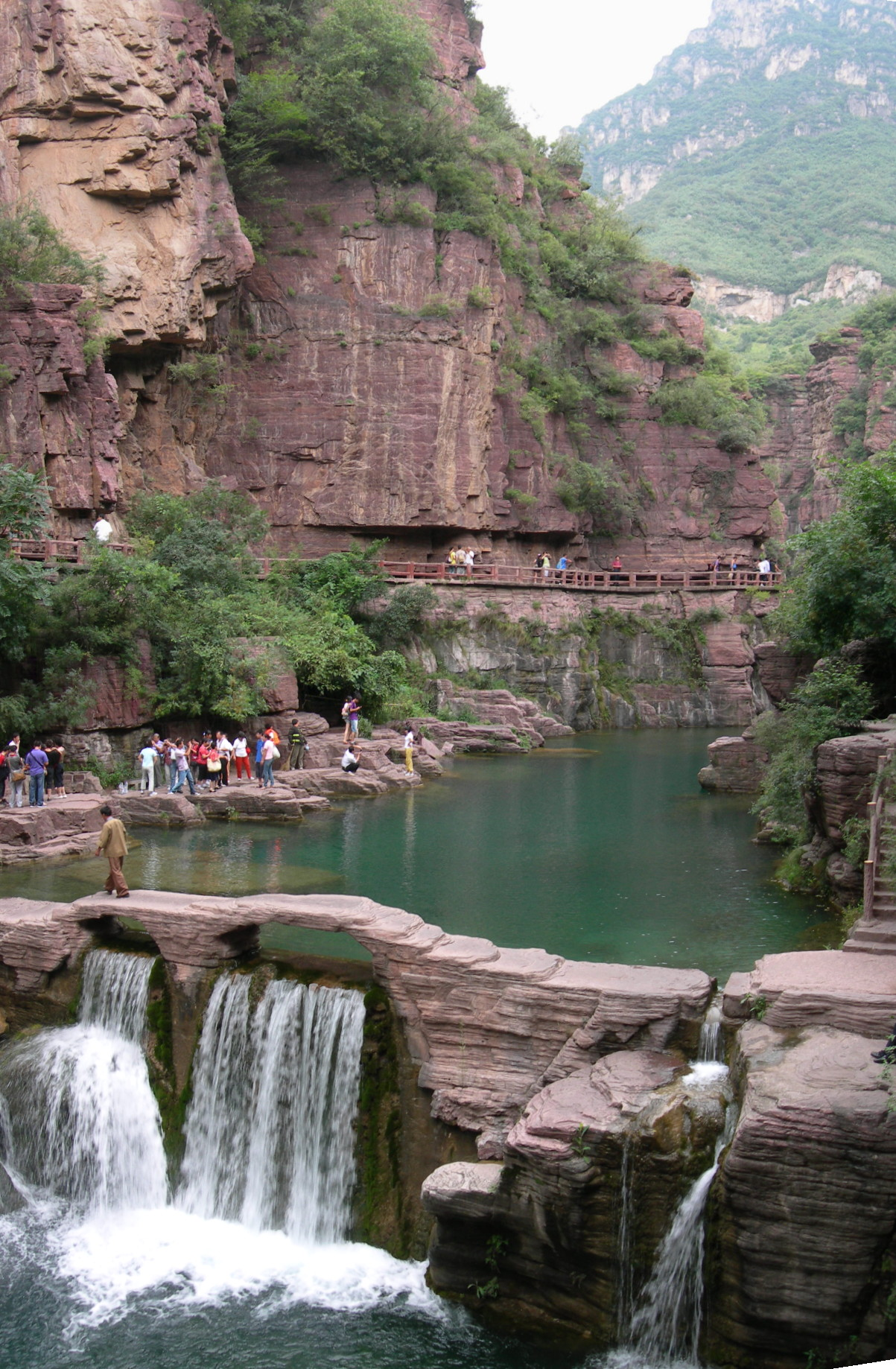

== Controversy ==
On 5 October 2015, a recently opened glass walkway to the mountain cracked two weeks after opening causing the closure of the walkway.

Situated within Yuntai Geo park, with a fall of 314 metres (1,030 ft), Yuntai waterfall has been claimed to be the tallest uninterrupted waterfall in China. However, in June 2024 a large metal pipe was discovered built high into the rock face. Officials stated that the pipe was to ensure tourists see a flow of water even during the dry season.
