= Yaoshan =

Yaoshan or Mount Yao may refer to the following locations in China:

- Mount Xiao (崤山), or Mount Yao, range in western Henan
- Mount Yao (Lushan County) (尧山), in central Henan
- Yaoshan, Hebei (腰山镇), town in Shunping County
- Yaoshan, Henan (尧山镇), town in Lushan County
- Yaoshan, Liaoning (药山镇), town in Xiuyan Manchu Autonomous County
- Yaoshan, Jinshi (药山镇), a town in Jinshi City, Hunan Province.
- Yaoshan, Qiaojia County (药山镇), town in Yunnan
- Yaoshan Subdistrict (药山街道), Tianqiao District, Jinan
- Yaoshan Township, Guizhou (瑶山乡), in Libo County
- Yaoshan Township, Yunnan (瑶山乡), in Hekou Yao Autonomous County
- Yaoshan Township, Zhejiang (瑶山乡), in Chun'an County
