= Lianglu =

Qing dynasty person CBDB = 124326

Lianglu (亮祿, ?–1803) was a Manchu military officer of the Irgen Gioro clan and the Plain Red Banner. He served during the reign of the Jiaqing Emperor and served as the Commander of Green Standard Army in Kaihua Garrison (開化鎮總兵), Yunnan.

== Biography ==
Lianglu inherited the hereditary rank of adaha hafan at a young age and later served as local Banner commander of Miyun. In the early years of the Jiaqing reign, he was assigned to Henan as a Canjiang (參將, roughly Colonel equivalent). In 1798, when the White Lotus Rebellion spread into Henan, Governor Wu Xiongguang (吳熊光) was stationed at Lushi, but most of his troops had been deployed elsewhere. Taking advantage of the situation, White Lotus rebels from Baofeng and Jia County rose in revolt and plundered Ruzhou. While Provincial Treasurer Ma Huiyu (馬慧裕) lacked military experience, Lianglu advocated immediate action. To intimidate the rebels, he spread false information that Qing reinforcements from Beijing were about to arrive. He then raised the Eight Banners and charged the cavalry forward, creating a tremendous noise that carried for miles. The rebels were thrown into confusion, allowing Lianglu to launch a night attack. His forces burned the rebel camp, routed the insurgents, and captured their leader, Li Yue (李岳), along with several others. When news of the victory reached Beijing, the Jiaqing Emperor was greatly delighted and immediately promoted Lianglu to the rank of Fujiang (副將, roughly Brigadier General equivalent). He was later promoted to Commander of Green Standard Army in Kaihua, Yunnan. Upon his death in 1803, the emperor reportedly expressed deep regret at his passing.
