= Guanghua =

Guanghua may refer to:

== Places in China ==
=== County ===
- Guanghua County (光化县), former county in Hubei, now part of Laohekou

=== Towns ===
These are all written as "光华镇":

- Guanghua, Jilin (zh), in Tonghua County, Jilin
- Guanghua, Xiangning County (zh), Shanxi

=== Townships ===
These are all written as "光华乡":

- Guanghua Township, Shanxi (zh), in Wanrong County
- Guanghua Township, Sichuan (zh), in Yilong County

=== Subdistricts ===
- Guanghua Subdistrict, Laohekou (zh; 光化街道), Laohekou, Xiangyang, Hubei
- Guanghua Subdistrict, Qianjiang (zh; 广华街道), Hubei
- Guanghua Subdistrict, Wenzhou (zh; 广化街道), in Lucheng District, Wenzhou, Zhejiang

Written as "光华街道":

- Guanghua Subdistrict, Shantou (zh), in Jinping District, Shantou, Guangdong
- Guanghua Subdistrict, Liaoyang (zh), in Hongwei District, Liaoyang, Liaoning
- Guanghua Subdistrict, Chengdu (zh), in Qingyang District, Chengdu, Sichuan

Guanghua Road Subdistrict (光华路街道)

- Guanghua Road Subdistrict, Anyang (zh), in Wenfeng District, Anyang, Henan
- Guanghua Road Subdistrict, Pingdingshan (zh), in Weidong District, Pingdingshan, Henan
- Guanghua Road Subdistrict, Nanjing (zh), in Qinhuai District, Nanjing, Jiangsu

== Others ==
- Guanghua School of Management (zh; 光华管理学院), part of Peking University
- Guanghua University, former university
- Guanghua Temple (disambiguation)
- Guang Hua Digital Plaza (光華商場), marketplace in Zhongzheng District, Taipei, Taiwan
- Kwong Wah Yit Poh (光华日报), Chinese-language newspaper of Malaysia
