= Shiren =

Shiren may refer to:

- Shi Ren, an official in the late Eastern Han dynasty
- Kokan Shiren, a 14th-century Japanese Zen patriarch and poet
- Mount Yao, formerly Mount Shiren, in Henan, China

== See also ==
- Shiren the Wanderer, a video game series
