= Pingdingshan No.1 High School =

School in Pingdingshan, Henan, China

Coordinates: 33°44′38″N 113°19′17″E

Pingdingshan No.1 High School is a high school in Weidong District, Pingdingshan, Henan, China. It was founded in 1961 and was one of the first Provincial Model High Schools in Henan. Because running the repeat classes which is forbidden by the Education Department of Henan, the Provincial Model High School title was canceled in 2010. Now, Pingdingshan No.1 High School is the only one in Pingsingshan which has the privilege to enroll "Hongzhi" students from all over the province.

As of 2016, it enrolled 4,200 students, had 252 teachers and 66 classes. The educational concept is "Quality first, all-round development".
