= Wenquan, Ruzhou =

Wenquan 温泉镇
- Town
- Location in Henan
- Coordinates: 34°13′00″N 112°39′03″E
- Country: People's Republic of China
- Province: Henan
- Prefecture-level city: Pingdingshan
- County-level city: Ruzhou
- Elevation: 258 m (846 ft)
- Time zone: UTC+8 (China Standard)

Wenquan (simplified Chinese: 温泉; traditional Chinese: 溫泉; pinyin: Wēnquán; lit. 'hot springs') is a town of Ruzhou City in western Henan province, China, located about 19 km (12 mi) west of Ruzhou's city centre and along G36 Nanjing–Luoyang Expressway. As of 2011, it has 28 villages under its administration.

== See also ==
- List of township-level divisions of Henan
