= Nanhua University =

Private university in Chiayi County, Taiwan

- 南華大學 (Chinese)
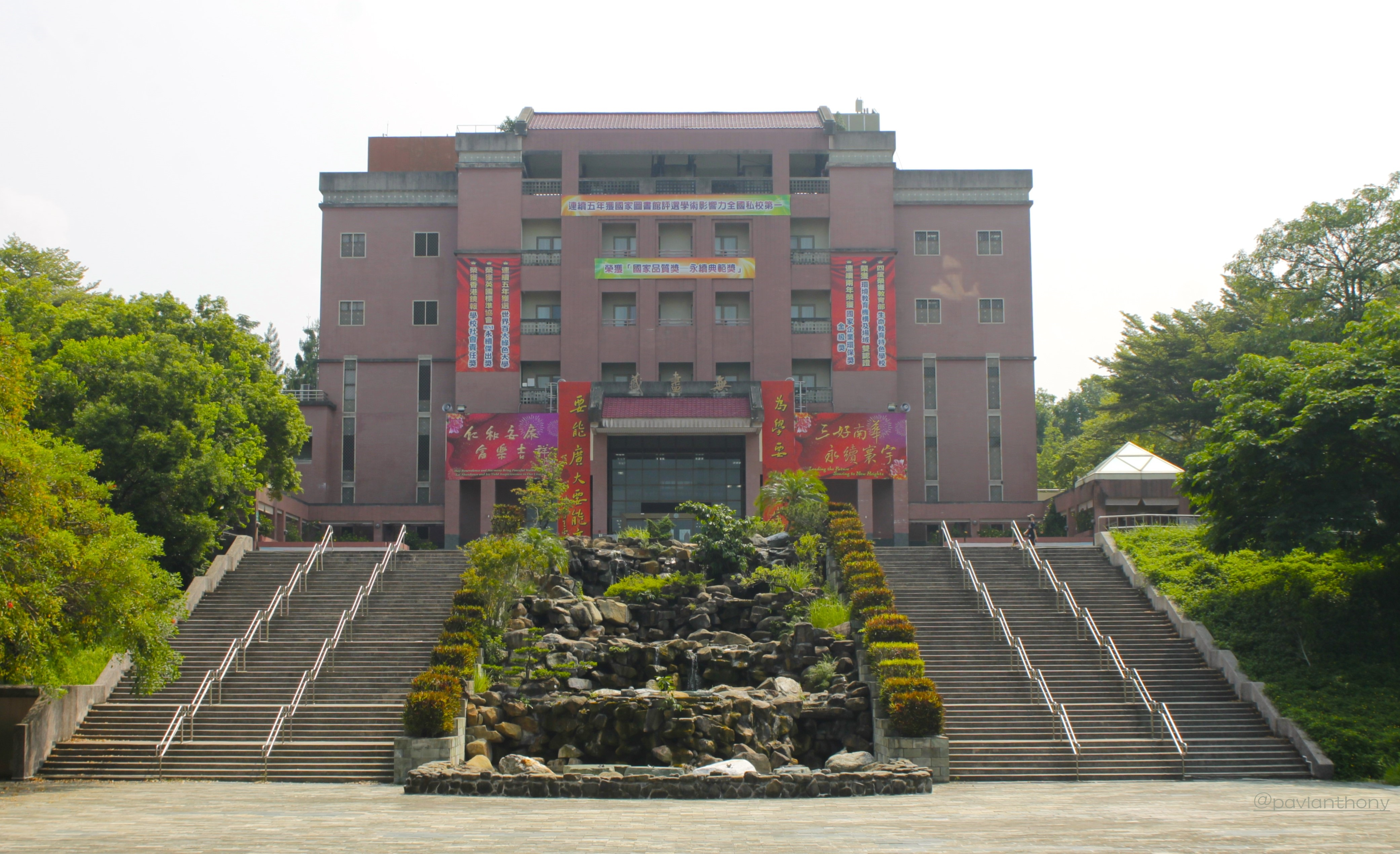
- Motto: 慧道中流
- Motto in English: Wisdom, Means, Middle Way
- Type: Private
- Established: 1996; 30 years ago
- Religious affiliation: Buddhist (Fo Guang Shan)
- President: Lin Tsong-ming (林聰明)
- Academic staff: 219 (full time)
- Students: 5,281 (2014)
- Undergraduates: 4,086 (2014)
- Postgraduates: 1,195 (2014)
- Location: Dalin, Chiayi County, Taiwan; 23.5693°N 120.4941°E
- Campus: Rural
- Website: en.nhu.edu.tw

Chinese name
- Traditional Chinese: 南華大學
- Simplified Chinese: 南华大学
Transcriptions
Standard Mandarin
- Hanyu Pinyin: Nánhuá Dàxué
Southern Min
- Hokkien POJ: Lâm-hôa Tāi-ha̍k

Nanhua University (NHU; Chinese: 南華大學) is a university located in Dalin Township, Chiayi County, Taiwan. Founded in 1996 by the Buddhist monk Hsing Yun of Fo Guang Shan as the Nanhua College of Management, it was elevated to university status in 1999.

In 2022, Times Higher Education World University Rankings ranked NHU 95th in its "Impact Rankings: Reducing inequalities" in the world.

NHU offers undergraduate and graduate programs in a variety of fields, including humanities, social sciences, management, and science and technology. The university has partnerships with over 100 universities in more than 30 countries, and students can participate in exchange programs, study tours, and other international activities.

== Administrative units ==
Academic	Student	General	OACC	OICA
Registration and Course Services Group	Life Services Group	Services Group	Admissions Centre	Chinese center
Test Services Group	Extracurricular Activities Section	Construction and Maintenance Group	Career Development Center	Overseas Student Group
Editing and Publishing Group	Health Care Group	Storage group	Internship LES	Cooperation and exchange group
Training and Promotion Centre	Student Counseling Center	Cashier group		
	Service Learning Group	Central Security Group		
	Military Training Room			
Personnel Office	Accounting Office	Office of the Secretary	Library	Computer Center
Service Group	Accounting Group	Secretary of the group	Digital Support Group	Systems Development Group
Administration Section	Budget Group	Public Relations	Cataloguing interview	Network systems group
		Correspondence Group	Reader Service Group	Administrative Support Unit

== Teaching units ==
- College of Management
  - Department of Business Administration (Bachelor, Master, and Doctoral Programs in Management Sciences)
  - Department of Nonprofit Organization Management (Master Program)
  - Department of Finance (Bachelor and Master Programs in Financial Management)
  - Department of Cultural & Creative Enterprise Management (Bachelor Program, Master Program)
  - Master Program in Leisure and Environment Management
  - Department of Tourism Management (Bachelor Program and Master Program in Tourism Management)
  - The Department of Accounting & information Sciences
- College of Humanities
  - Department of Life-and-Death Studies (Bachelor Program, Master Program)
  - Department of Literature (Bachelor Program, Master Program)
  - Department of Early Childhood Education (Bachelor Program, Master Program)
  - Graduate Institute of Religious Studies
  - Department of Foreign Languages and Literature (Bachelor Program)
- College of Social Sciences
  - Department of Communication (Bachelor Program, Master Program)
  - Graduate Institute of European Studies (Master Program)
  - Department of Applied Sociology (Bachelor and Master Programs in Sociology; Master Program in Sociology of Education)
  - Department of International and China Studies (Bachelor Program, Master Program in Asia-Pacific Studies, Master Program in Public Policy Studies)
- College of Arts
  - Department of Visual and Media Arts (Bachelor Program, Master Program)
  - Department of Architecture and Landscape Design, Master Program in Environmental Arts (Master Program)
  - Department of Creative Product Design (Bachelor Program, Master Program)
  - Art Culture Research Center
  - Department of Ethnomusicology (Ethnomusicology Group, National Country Music Group) (Bachelor Program, Master Program)
- College of Science and Technology
  - Department of Information Management (Bachelor Program)
  - Department of Electronic Commerce Management (Bachelor Program)
  - Department of Computer Science and Information Engineering (Bachelor Program)
  - Graduate Institute of Natural Healing Sciences (Master Program)
  - Department of Natural Biotechnology (Bachelor Program)
- Center for General Education

== Gallery ==
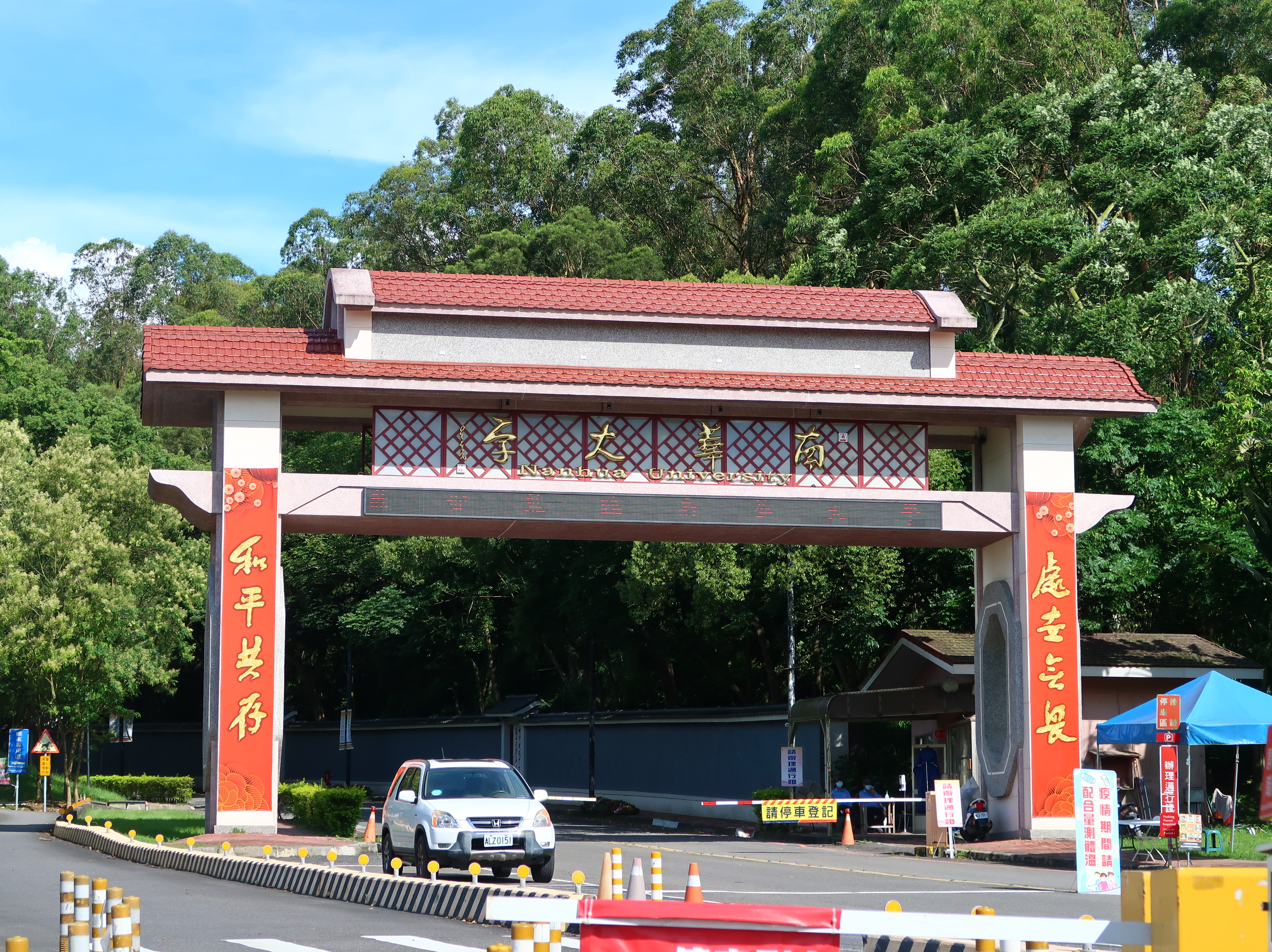
Nanhua University Main Entrance (南華大學- 維基百科校徽地標)

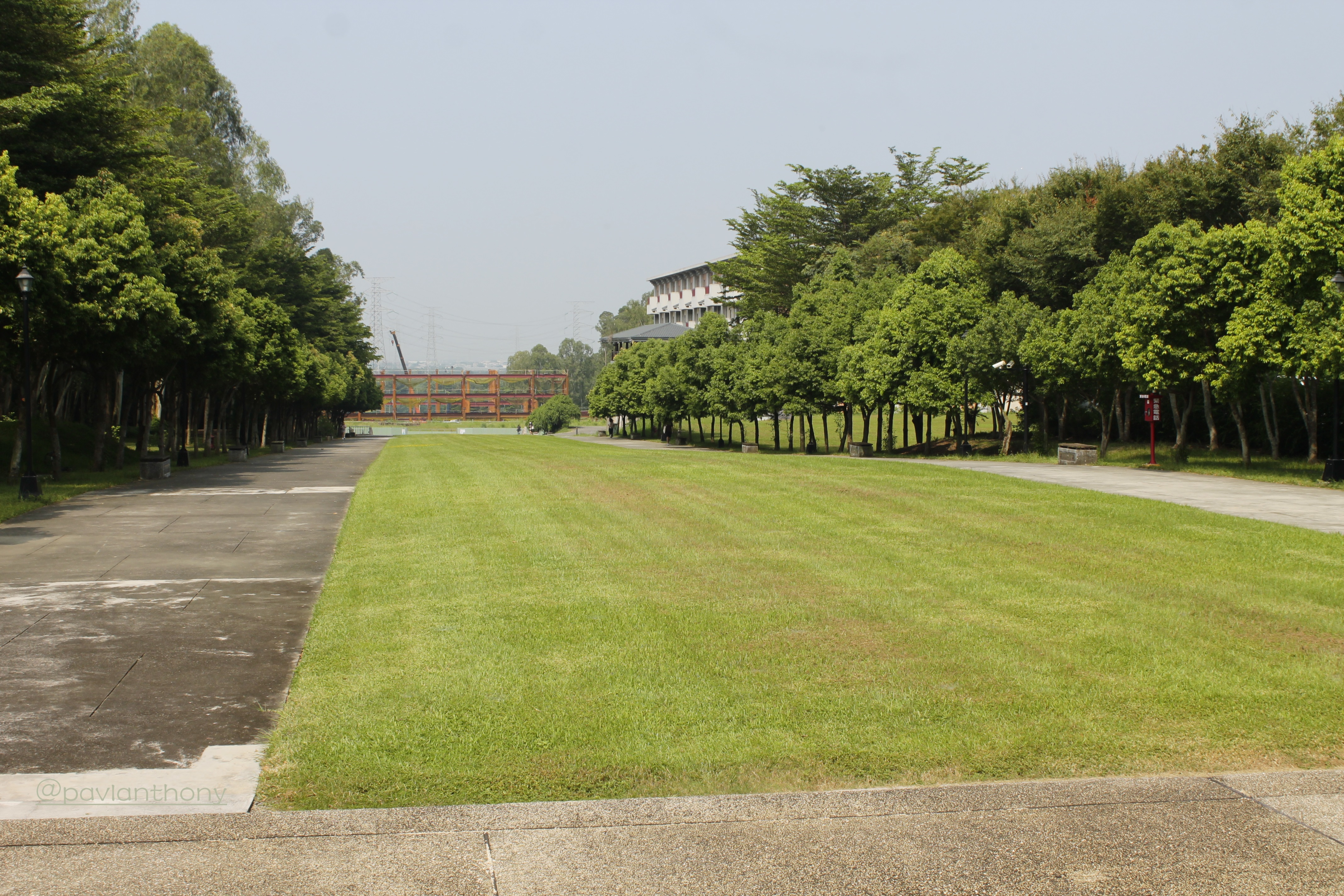
Lotus Walkway (九品 蓮華大道) taken in September 2023

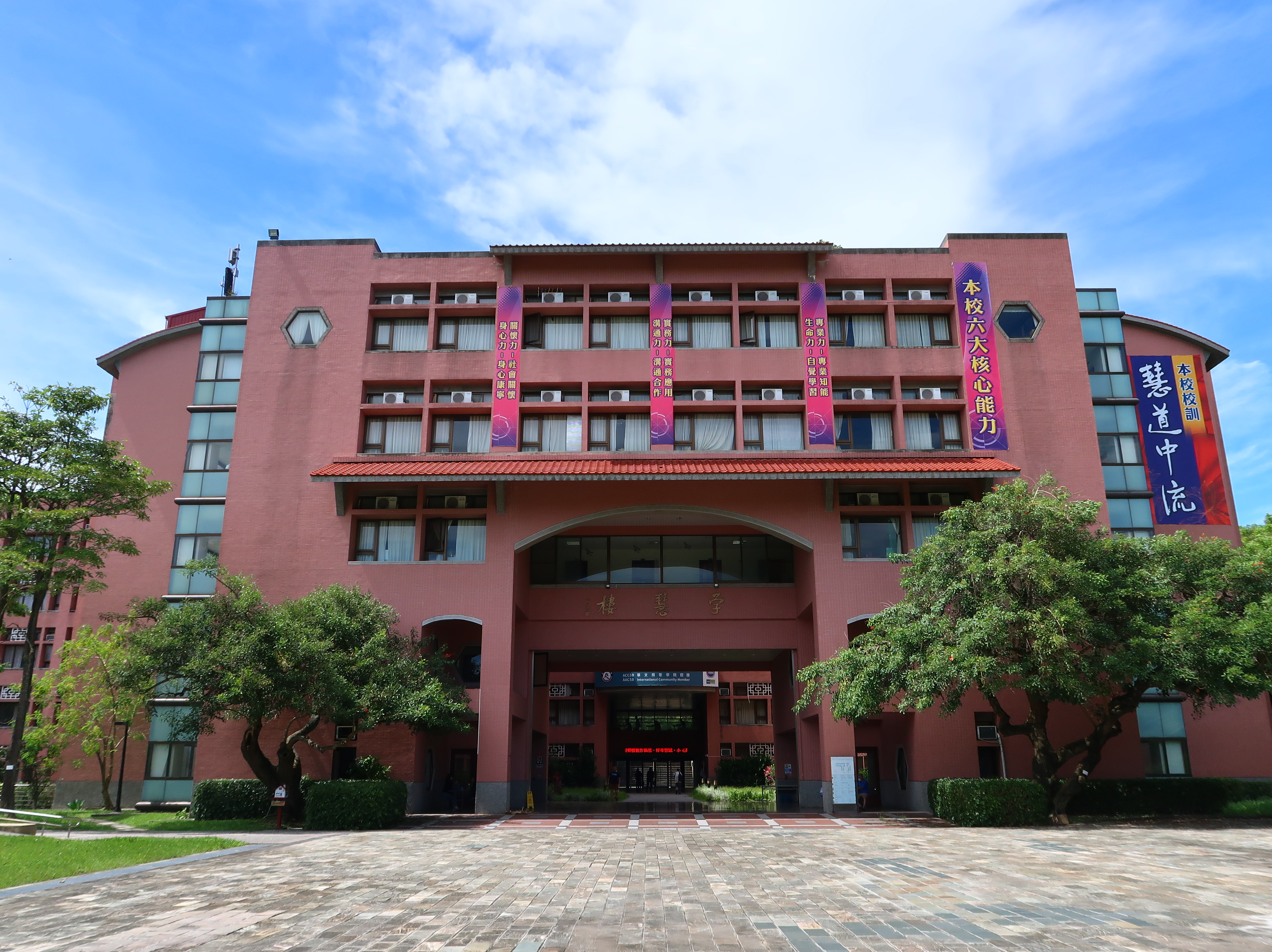
Performing Arts Theater (學慧樓)

== Exchange Institutions ==
- United States
  - University of the West
  - Maharishi University of Management
  - University of Houston
  - Western Kentucky University
  - Metropolitan State University
- Japan
  - Chiba University
- South Korea
  - Sookmyung Women's University
  - Incheon National University
  - Uiduk University
  - Geumgang University
  - Dongguk University
- Malaysia
  - Universiti Tunku Abdul Rahman
  - New Era University College
  - Southern University College
  - Han Chiang University College of Communication
  - One World Hanxing College of Journalism and Communication
- Thailand
  - Mahachulalongkornrajavidyalaya University
  - Mahamakut Buddhist University
  - Dhammachai Institute
- Philippines
  - University of the East
  - Guang Ming College
  - University of San Carlos
- Mongolia
  - Global leadership University
  - Otgontenger University
  - National University of Mongolia
- Vietnam
  - Vietnam National University
  - Hanoi University of Business and Technology
- Brazil
  - University of São Paulo
- Chile
  - University of St. Thomas
- United Kingdom
  - Coventry University

- Italy
  - University of Gastronomic Sciences
- Spain
  - University of the Balearic Islands
- Poland
  - University of Warsaw
- Australia
  - Nan tien institute
  - University of Wollongong
- China
  - Nanjing University
  - Zhengzhou University
  - Northwest University
  - Yunnan University
  - China Conservatory of Music
  - Beijing Institute of Graphic Communication
  - Beijing City University
  - Jiujiang University
  - Jiangxi Institute of Fashion Technology
  - Yangzhou University
  - Sanjiang University
  - Pingdingshan University
  - Henan University
  - Guizhou Normal University
  - Taiyuan Normal University
  - Tianjin Conservatory of Music
  - Anhui Foreign Languages University
  - Wuhan Bioengineering Institute
  - Ningbo Dahongying University
  - Hangzhou Normal University
  - Yunnan Technology and Business
  - Southwest University for Nationalities
  - Tianfu College of SWUFE
  - Shanghai Normal University Tianhua College
  - Xianda College of Economics
  - Shanghai Jianqiao University
  - Changsha University
  - Hebei University
  - Jilin Animation Institute
  - Jilin Jianzhu University
  - Jilin Huaqiau University of Foreign Languages
  - Changchun University
  - Changchun University of Chinese Medicine
  - Changchun Normal University
  - Changchun Guanghua University
  - Beihua University
  - Tonghua Normal University
  - Changchun Architecture & Civil Engineering College
  - Qiqihar Institute of Technology
  - East University of Heilongjiang

== See also ==
- Fo Guang University
- University of the West
