= Zhanhe, Pingdingshan =

Coordinates: 33°43′44″N 113°16′50″E

Zhanhe 湛河区
- District
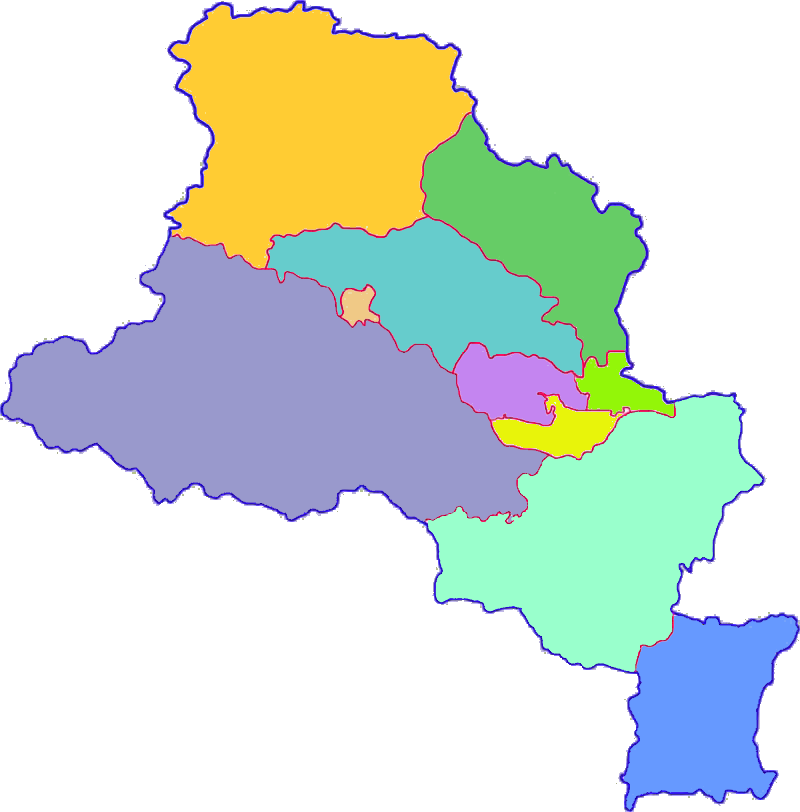
- Zhanhe in Pingdingshan

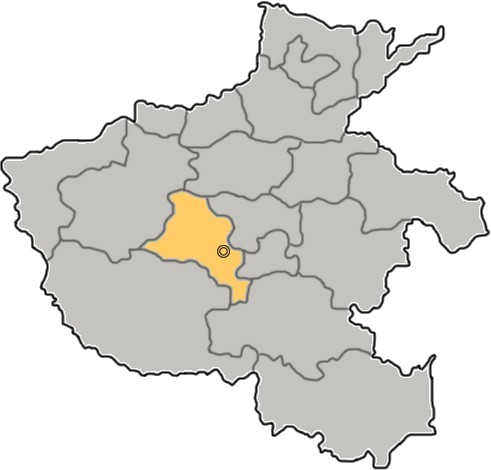
- Pingdingshan in Henan
- Country: People's Republic of China
- Province: Henan
- Prefecture-level city: Pingdingshan

Area
  - Total: 124 km^{2} (48 sq mi)

Population (2019)
  - Total: 293,100
  - Density: 2,360/km^{2} (6,120/sq mi)
- Time zone: UTC+8 (China Standard)
- Postal code: 467000

Zhanhe District (Chinese: 湛河区; pinyin: Zhànhé Qū) is a district of the city of Pingdingshan, Henan province, China.

== Administrative divisions ==
As of 2012, this district is divided to 6 subdistricts, 1 town and 1 township.

Subdistricts

- Mazhuang Subdistrict (马庄街道)
- Nanhuanlu Subdistrict (南环路街道)
- Yaomeng Subdistrict (姚孟街道)
- Jiulishan Subdistrict (九里山街道)
- Qinggonglu Subdistrict (轻工路街道)
- Gaoyanglu Subdistrict (高阳路街道)

Towns

- Beidu (北渡镇)

Townships

- Caozhen Township (曹镇乡)
