= 2009 Henan mine disaster =

Gas explosion in Henan, China

Coordinates: 35.7333°N 113.3°E

A mining disaster took place on 8 September 2009 in Pingdingshan city, in Henan province in China.

The gas explosion took place around 1 a.m. Tuesday in the Xinhua No.4 pit in Xinhua District of Pingdingshan City. 93 men were working underground, of which 14 managed to escape to safety. Initial report said 35 were confirmed dead and 44 were missing. On 9 September, the death toll rose to 44, while 35 were still missing. On 27 September, the total death toll was confirmed 67, while 9 people remained missing. Each family of the dead or missing workers was compensated 400,000 yuan.
