= Spring Temple Buddha =

Colossal statue of Vairocana Buddha in Henan, China

- 中原大佛; Zhōngyuán dàfó
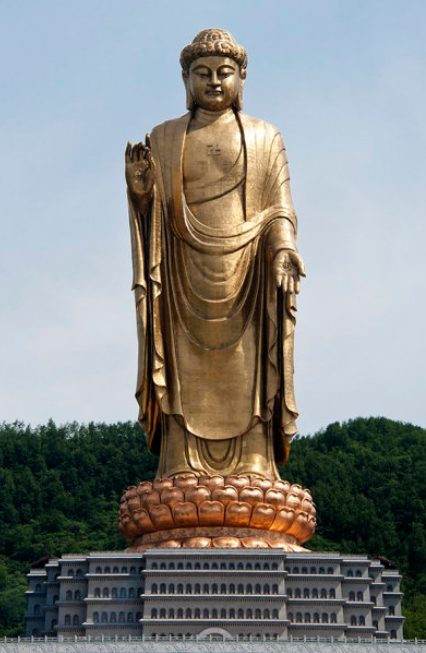
- Spring Temple Buddha with its pedestals
- Interactive map of Spring Temple Buddha
- Location: Foquan Temple, Fodushan Scenic Area, Lushan County, Pingdingshan, Henan, China
- Coordinates: 33°46′30″N 112°27′03″E
- Type: Statue
- Material: Copper cast
- Height: Statue: 128 metres (420 ft); Including base: 208 metres (682 ft)
- Completion date: 29 September 2008
- Dedicated to: Vairocana Buddha

The Zhongyuan Buddha (Chinese: 中原大佛; pinyin: zhōngyuán dàfó; lit. 'Big Buddha of the Great Plains' and simplified Chinese: 鲁山大佛; traditional Chinese: 魯山大佛; pinyin: Lǔshān dàfó) or better known in English as the Spring Temple Buddha is a colossal statue depicting Vairocana Buddha located in Foquan Temple (Chinese: 佛泉寺; pinyin: fó quán sì; lit. 'Buddha Natural-Spring Temple') in the Zhaocun township of Lushan County, Henan, China, built between 1997 and 2008. It is located within the Fodushan Scenic Area, close to National Freeway 311. At 128 metres (420 ft), including a 20-metre (66 ft) lotus throne, it is the second-tallest statue in the world after the Statue of Unity in Gujarat, India, which surpassed it in 2018 with a height of 182 metres (597 ft).

== Description ==
Taking into account the 25-metre (82 ft) pedestal/building atop which it is placed, the monument has a total height of 153 metres (502 ft). As of October 2008, the hill on which the statue stands was reshaped to form two further pedestals, the upper one being 15 m (49 ft) tall. The total height of the monument is now said to be 208 m (682 ft).

The overall project was estimated to cost about US$55 million, with US$18 million allocated to the statue itself. It was originally estimated to consist of 1,100 pieces of copper cast, with a total weight of 1,000 tonnes.

The Spring Temple Buddha derives its name from the nearby Tianrui hot spring, whose water, at 60 °C (140 °F), is renowned in the area for its curative properties. The Foquan Temple, built during the Tang dynasty, houses the Bell of Good Luck, placed on top of the Dragon Head peak. This bronze bell weighs 116 tonnes.

Inscribed within the statue's chest is a small swastika, the ancient Indian symbol of good fortune.

== Gallery ==
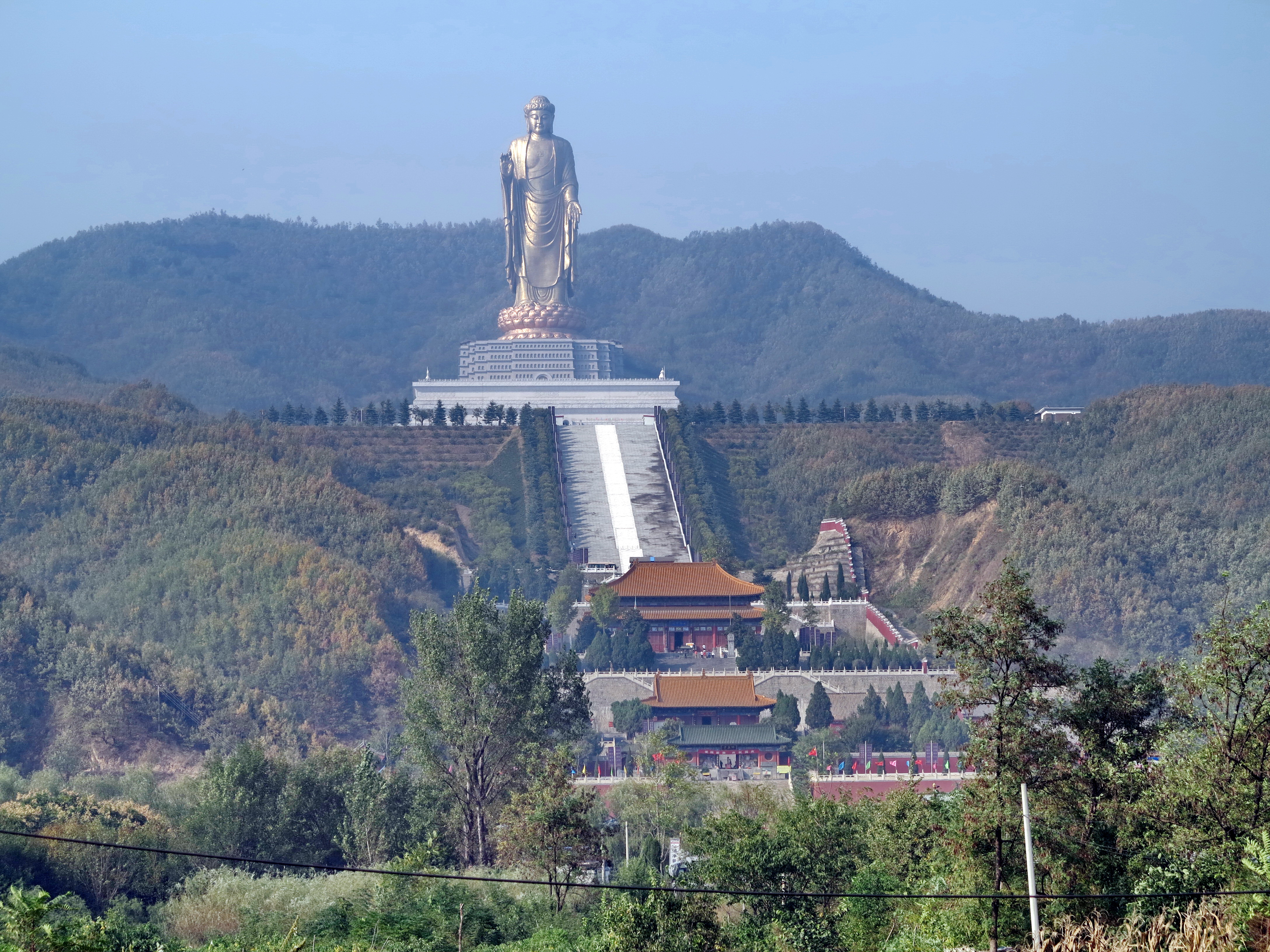
Spring Temple Buddha

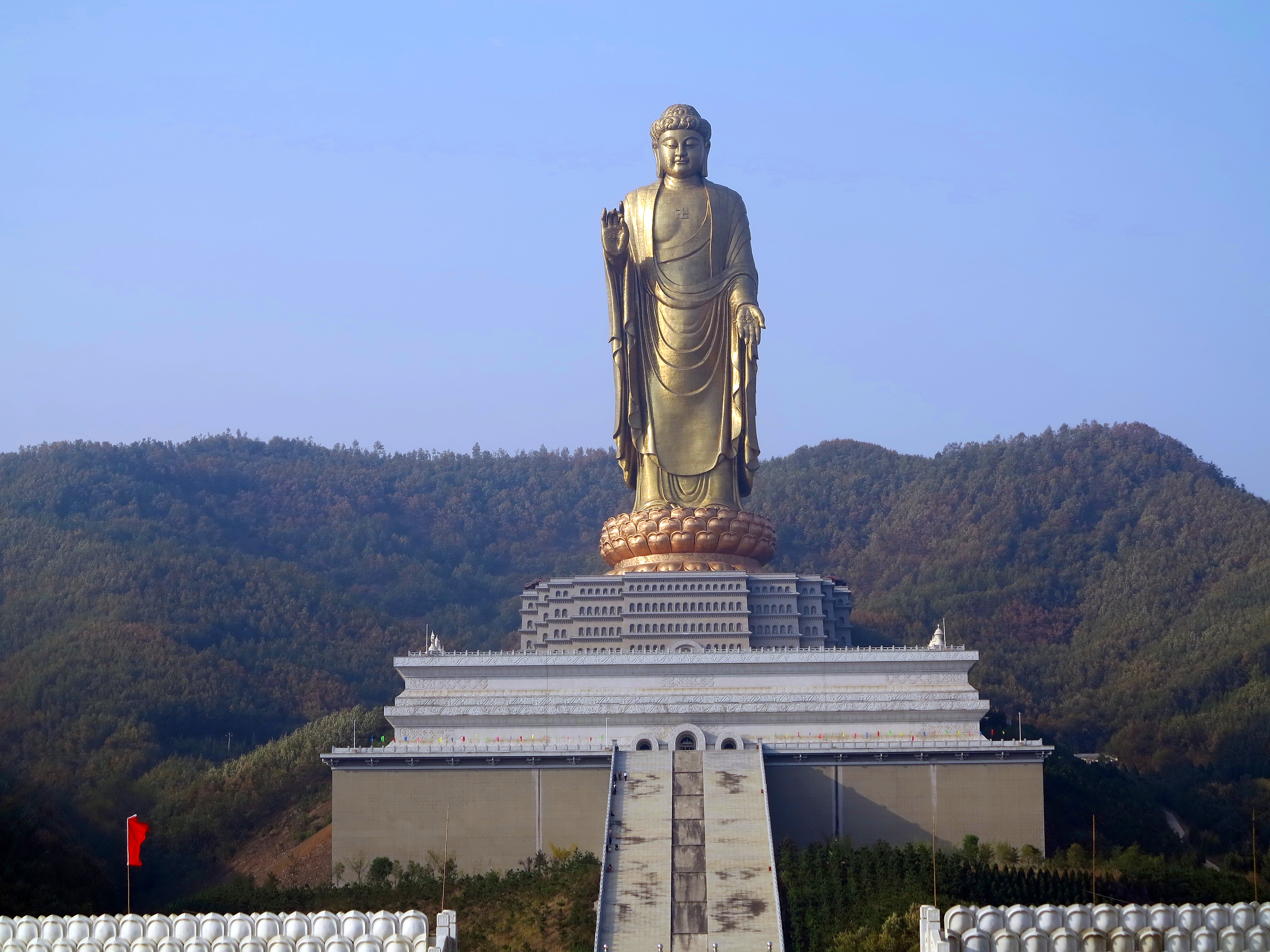
Spring Temple Buddha

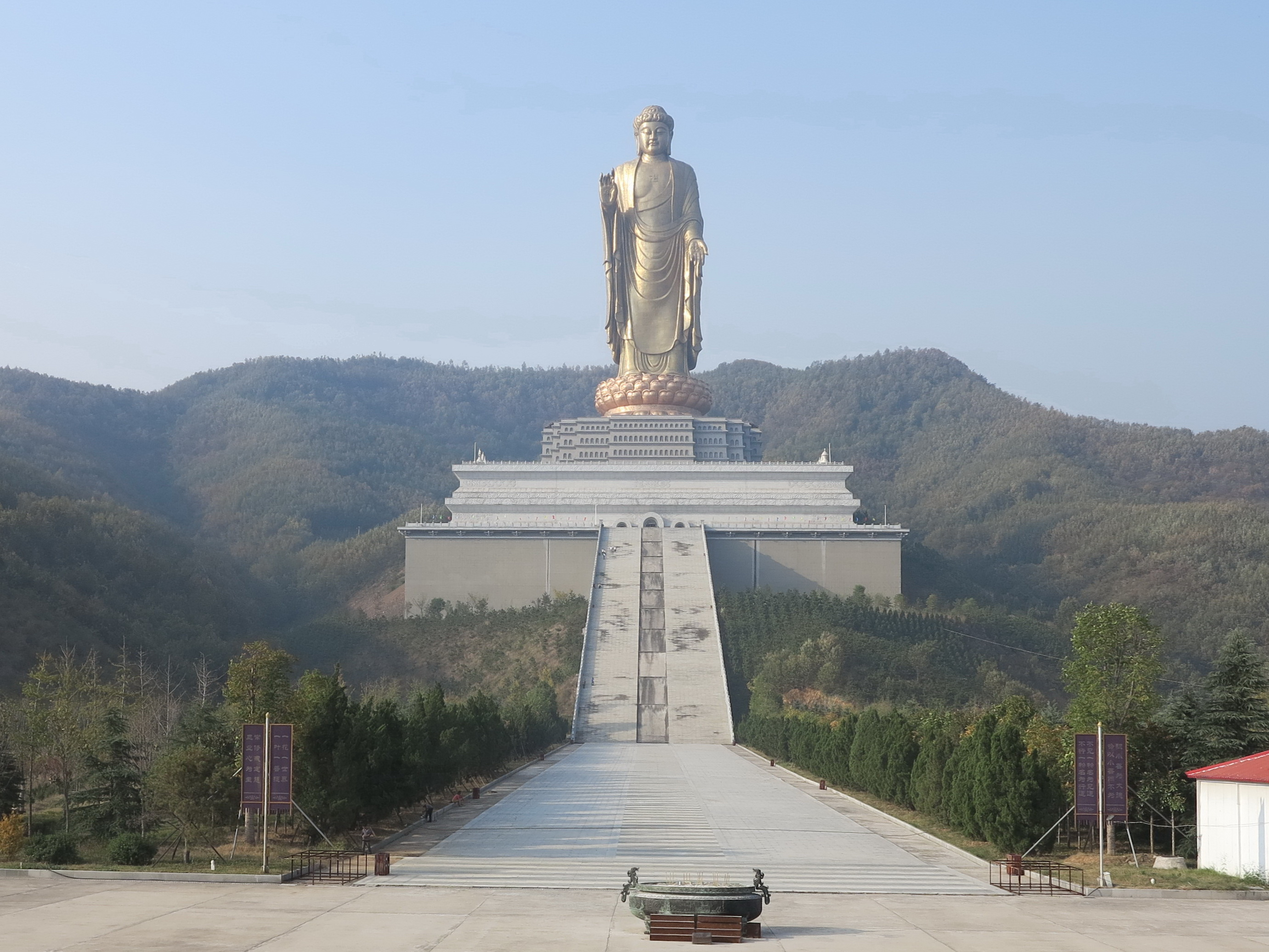
Spring Temple Buddha

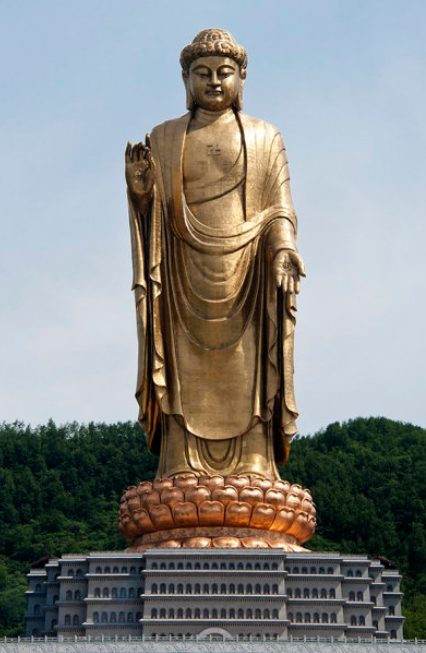
Spring Temple Buddha

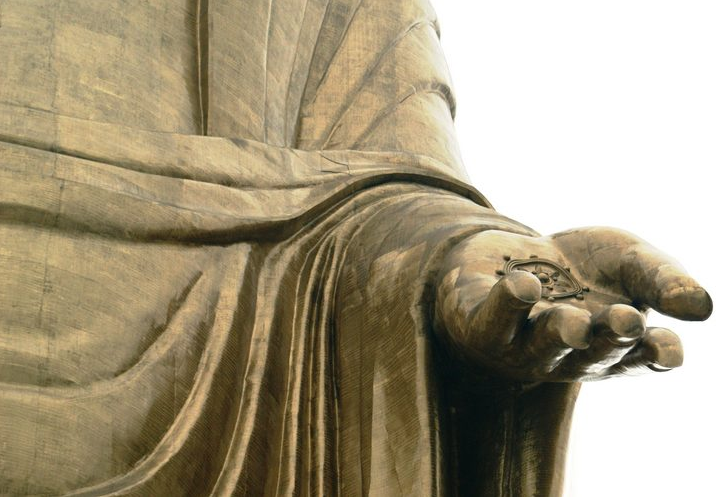
Hand of the Buddha

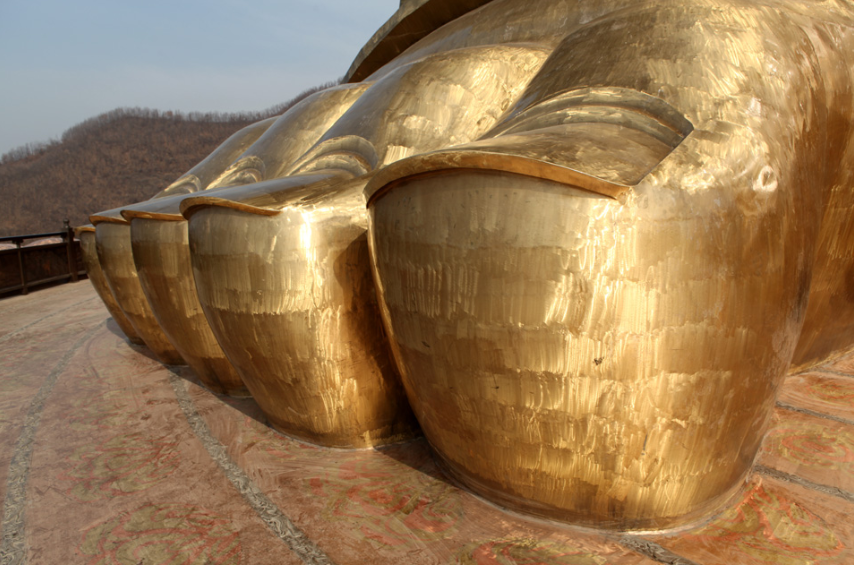
Foot of the Spring Temple Buddha

== See also ==
Approximate heights of various notable statues: 1. Statue of Unity 240 m (790 ft) (incl. 58 m (190 ft) base); 2. Spring Temple Buddha 153 m (502 ft) (incl. 25 m (82 ft) pedestal and 20 m (66 ft) throne); 3. Statue of Liberty (Liberty Enlightening the World) 93 m (305 ft) (incl. 47 m (154 ft) pedestal); 4. The Motherland Calls 87 m (285 ft) (incl. 2 m (6 ft 7 in) pedestal); 5. Christ the Redeemer 38 m (125 ft) (incl. 8 m (26 ft) pedestal); 6. Michelangelo's David 5.17 m (17.0 ft) (excl. 2.5 m (8 ft 2 in) plinth)

- List of tallest statues
- Grand Buddha at Ling Shan

Records
Preceded by Laykyun Sekkya; 116 m (381 ft)	World's tallest statue 2008–2018	Succeeded by Statue of Unity; 182 m (597 ft)
