= Pingdingshan Museum =

Historical museum in Henan, China

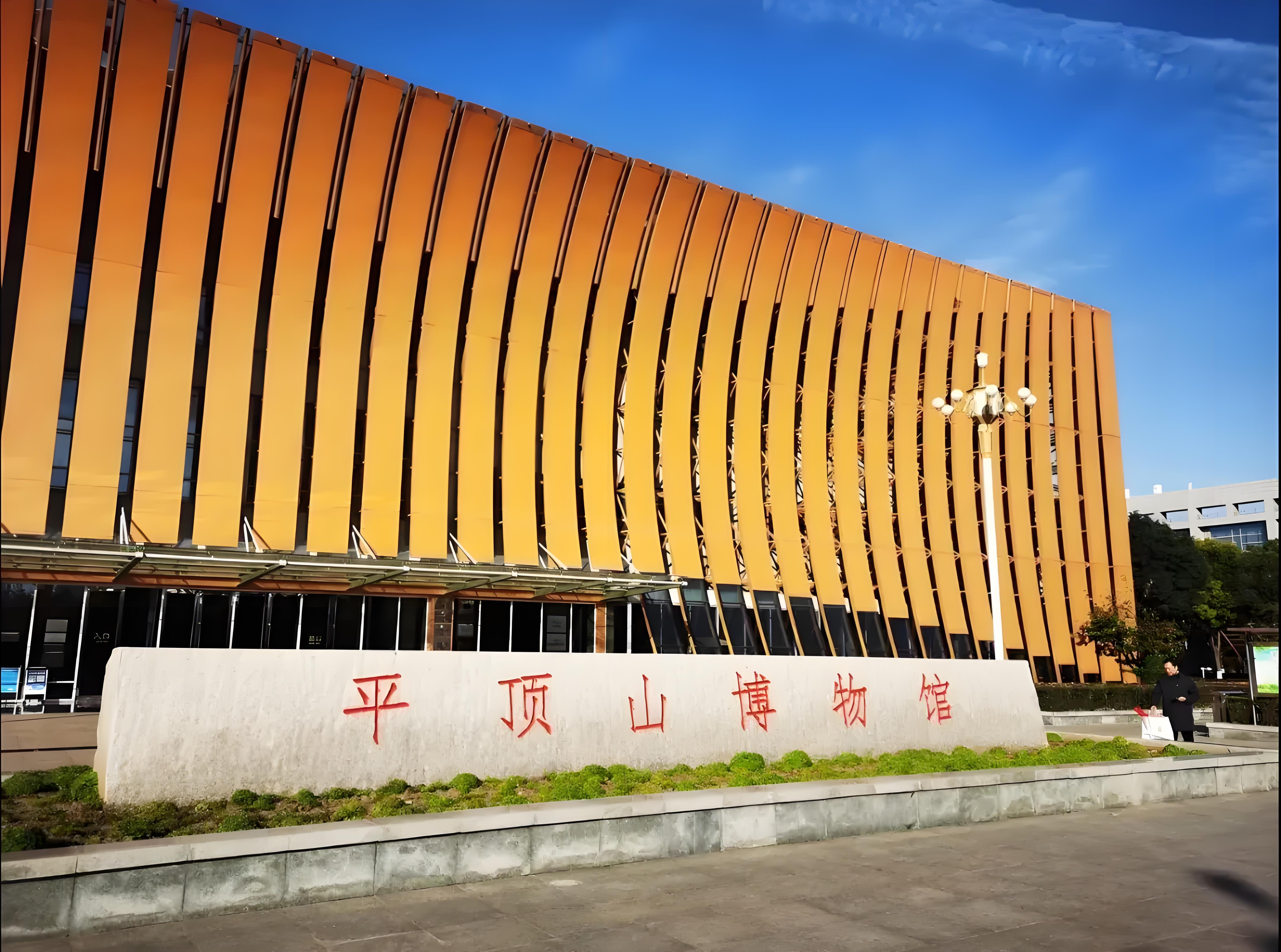
- Established: May 15, 2012
- Location: Pingdingshan, Henan, PRC
- Coordinates: 33.7656°N 113.1836°E
- Type: History museum
- Collection size: 51,479

Pingdingshan Museum (Chinese: 平顶山博物馆), located in Pingdingshan, Henan Province, China, is a public museum that serves as a historical repository for this region. Officially opened on May 15, 2012, the museum occupies a built area of 30,000 square meters at the intersection of Chang'an Avenue and Huai Ren Road, adjacent to Ping'an Square.

== Collections ==
The museum's collection comprises over 51,479 items, which includes 1,836 classified as precious. These artifacts span several historical periods, featuring Neolithic ceramics, Zhou dynasty jades, Han dynasty pottery, and notable examples of Luoyang Flower Porcelain and Jia County Jun Porcelain. Key highlights include a white jade carved eagle from the Western Zhou and a cocoon-shaped pot from the Han dynasty, reflecting the region's rich historical and cultural past.

Exhibitions at Pingdingshan Museum are diverse, with permanent displays organized into several thematic sections. These include exhibitions on the ancient homelands that trace back to the Peiligang culture, showcasing developments through the Han dynasty. Another section focuses on the Ying state, highlighting its bronze artifacts. Further exhibitions cover the cultural interactions between the Central Plains and the Chu culture during the Warring States period, as well as porcelain traditions from the Tang and Song dynasties.

=== Gallery ===
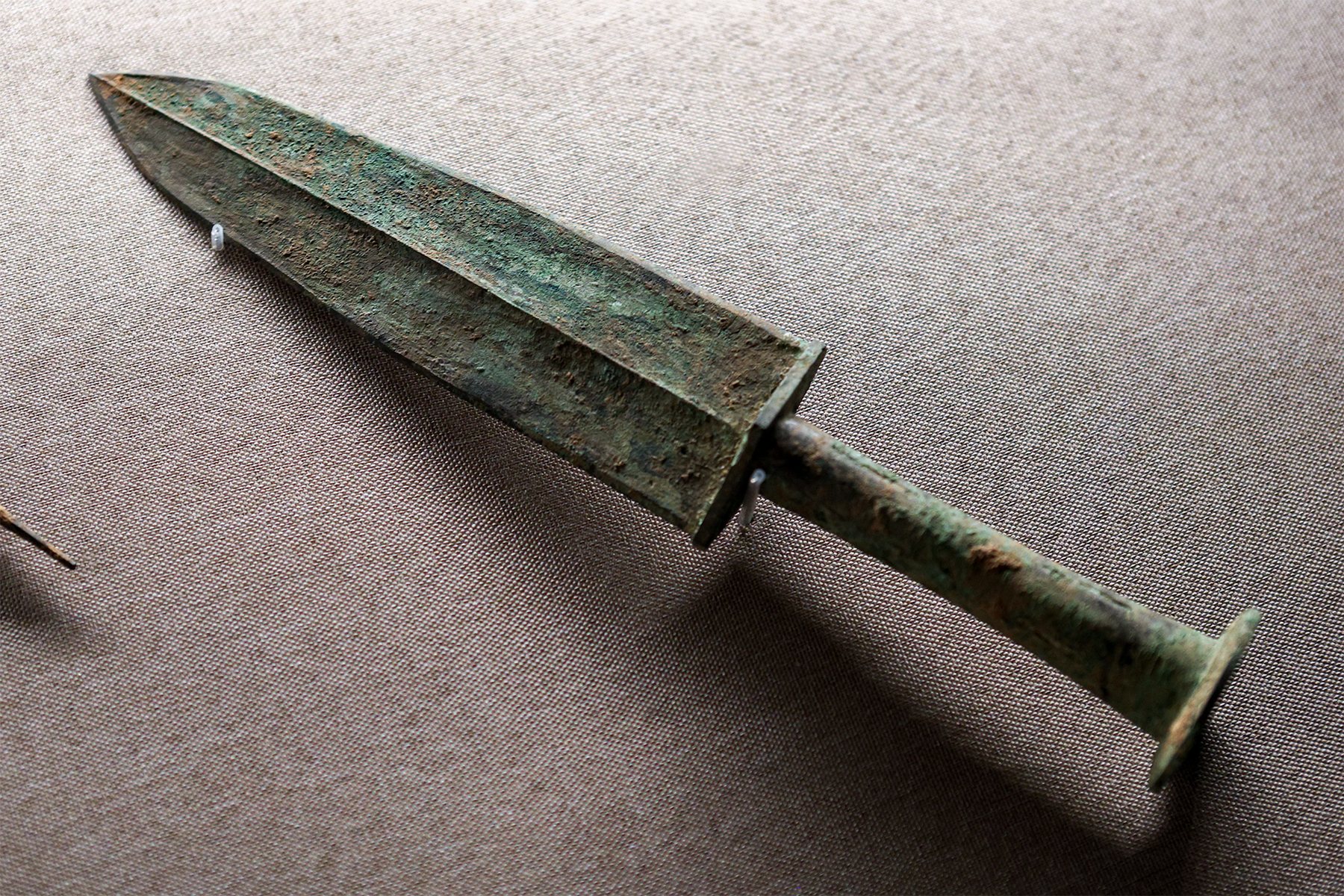
Bronze Dagger

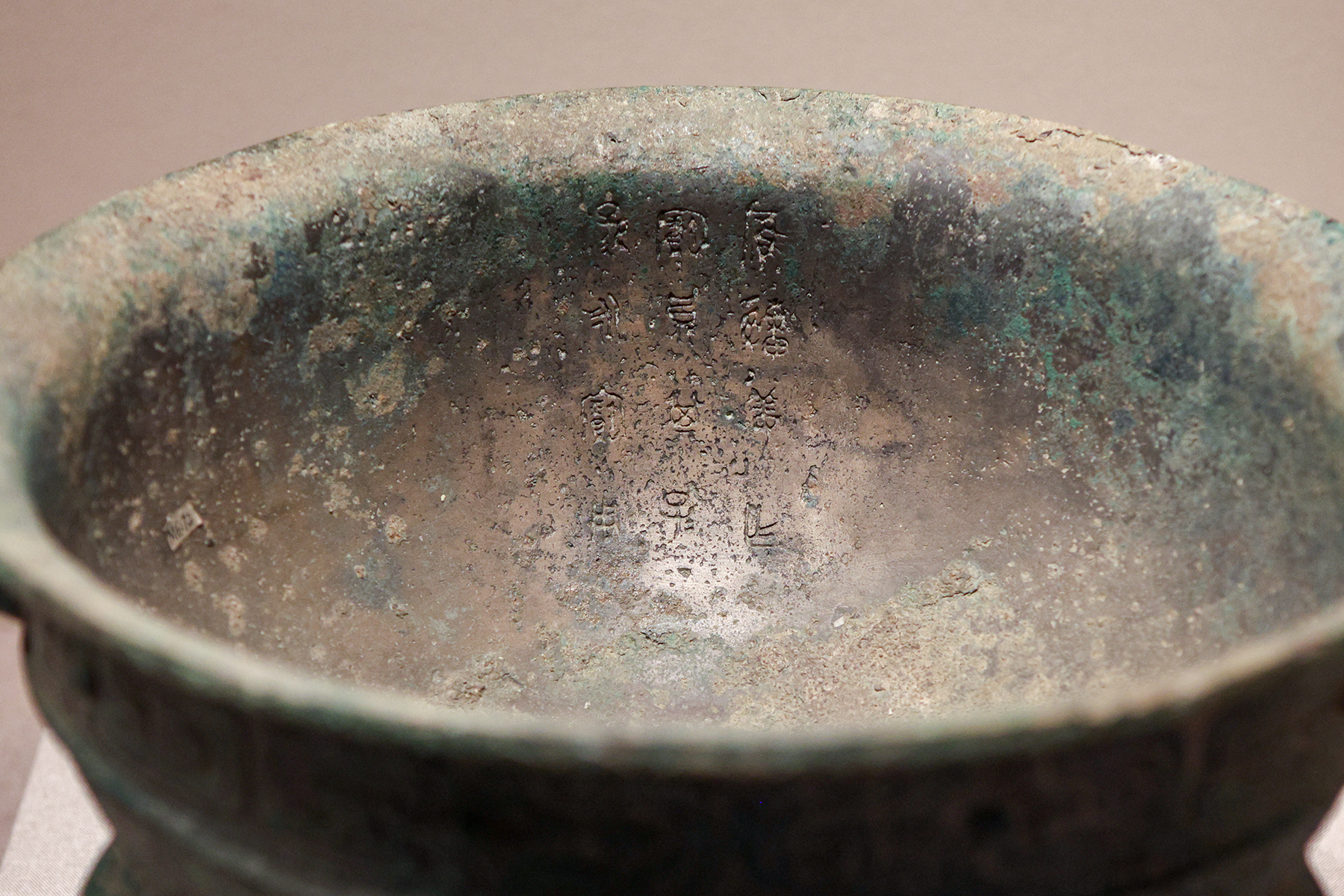
Bowl (close up)

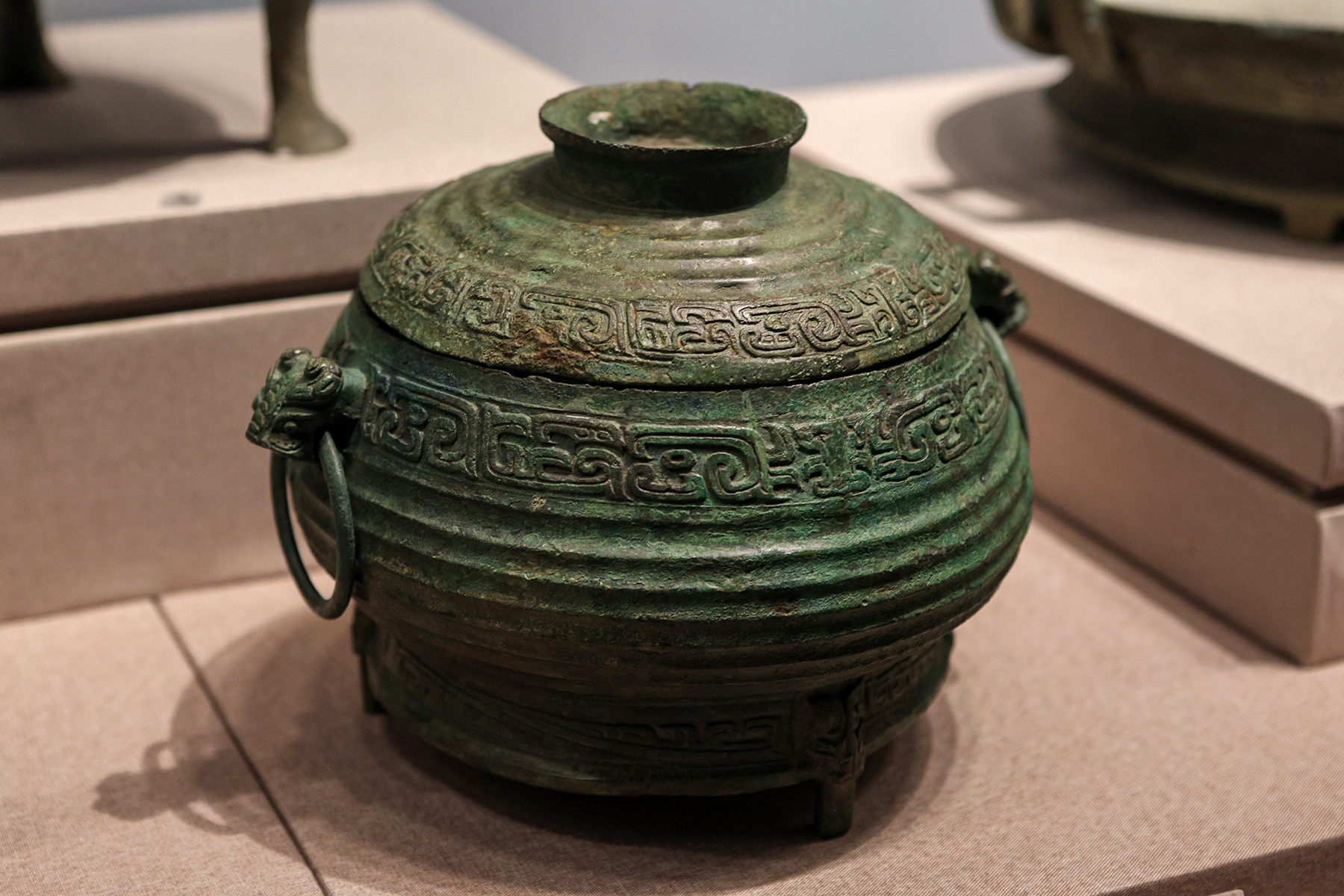
Deng Gong Gui

== Architecture ==
The museum's architectural design, conceptualized by the Architectural Design Institute of Tsinghua University, is inspired by bamboo slips.
