= Pingdingshan =

Pingdingshan 平顶山市 Pingtingshan
- Prefecture-level city
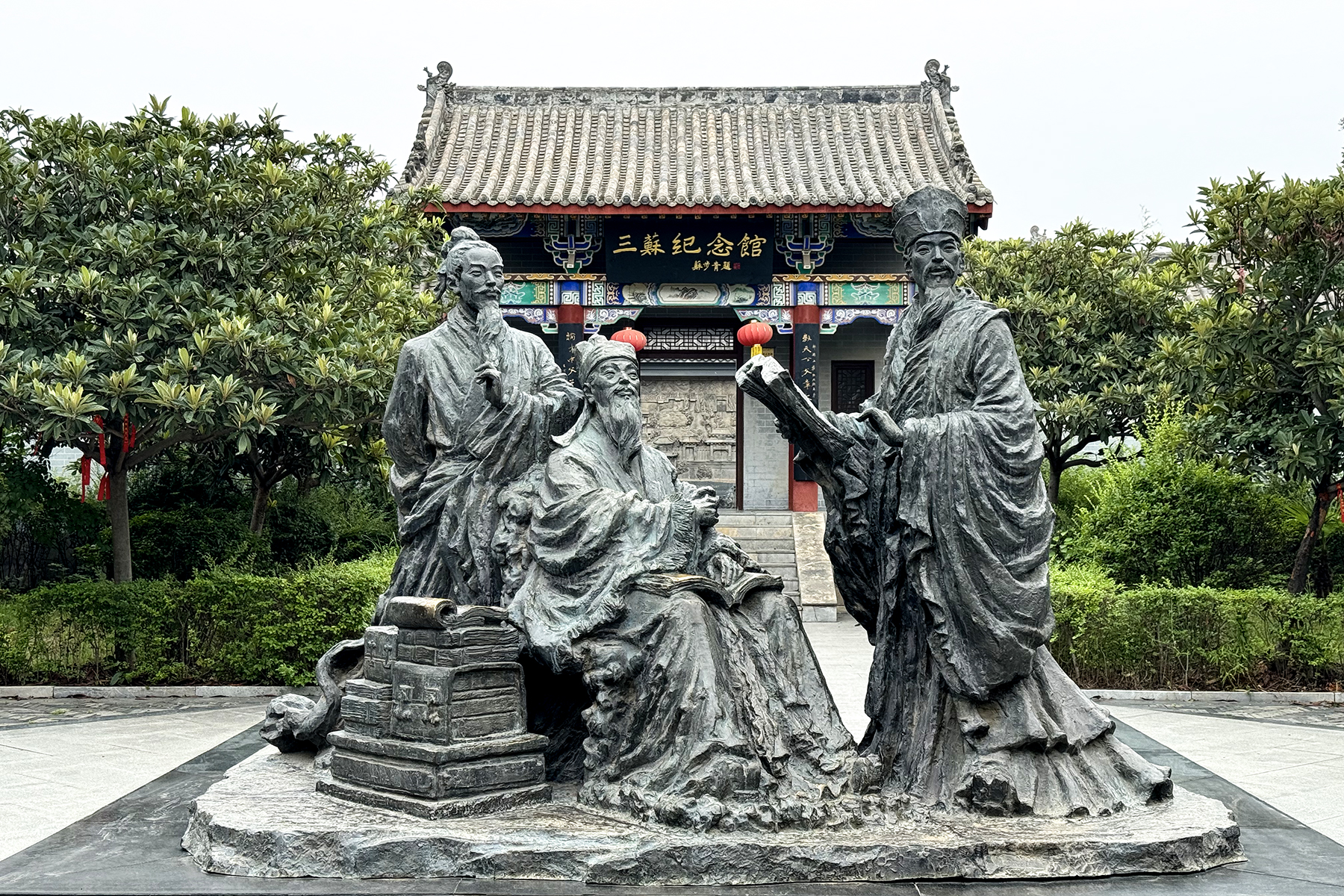
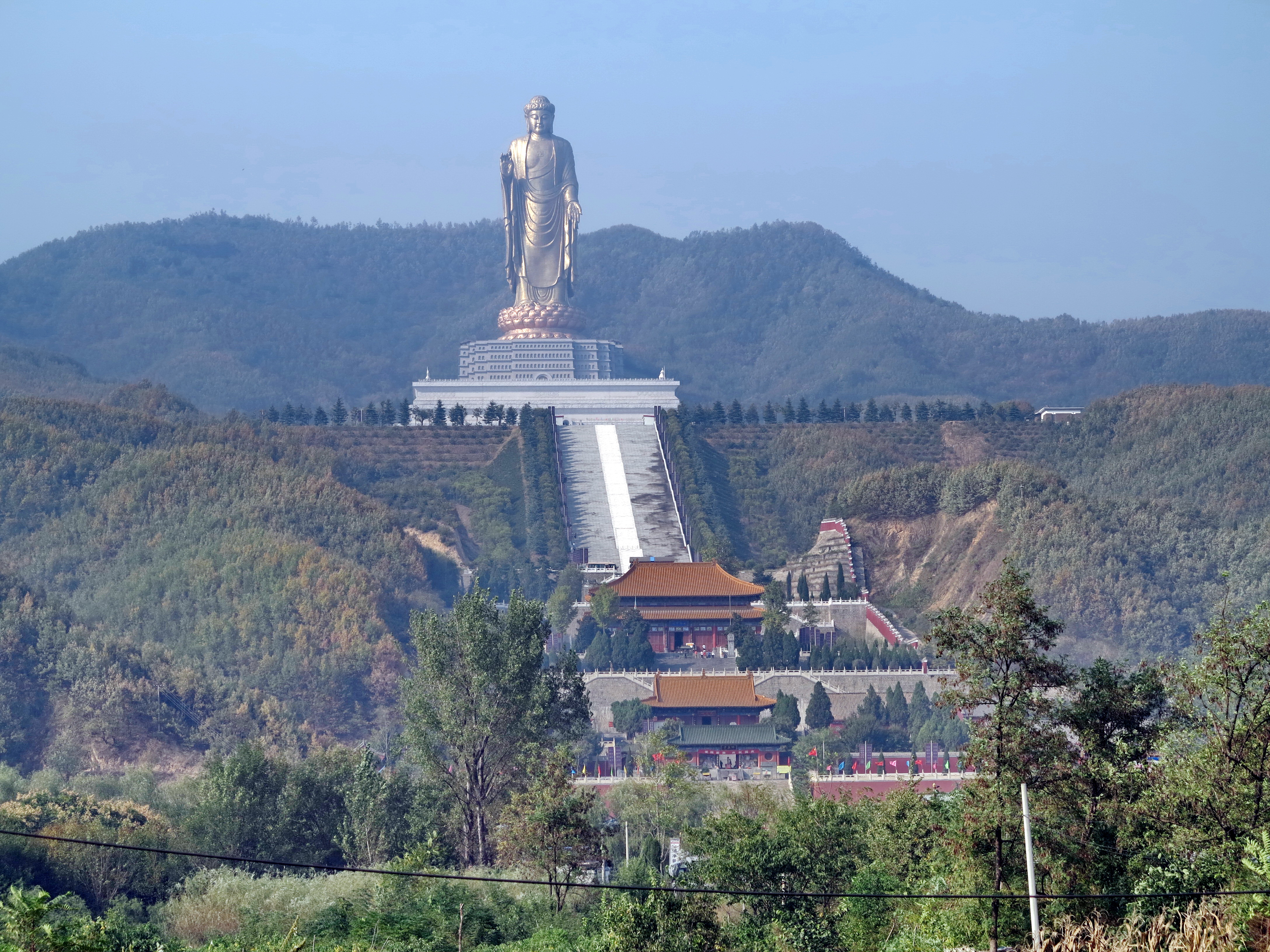
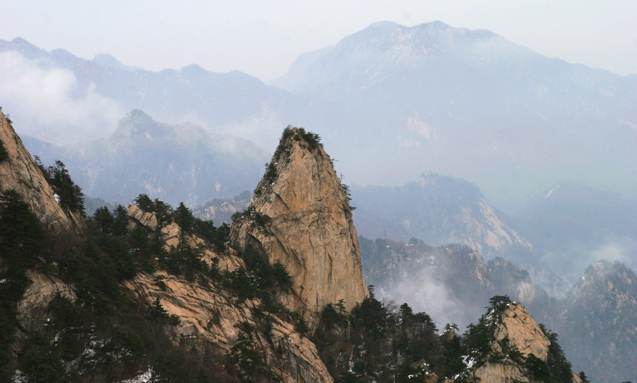
- Statues at Three-Su Temple in Jia County Spring Temple Buddha Mount Yao
- Nickname: Eagle City
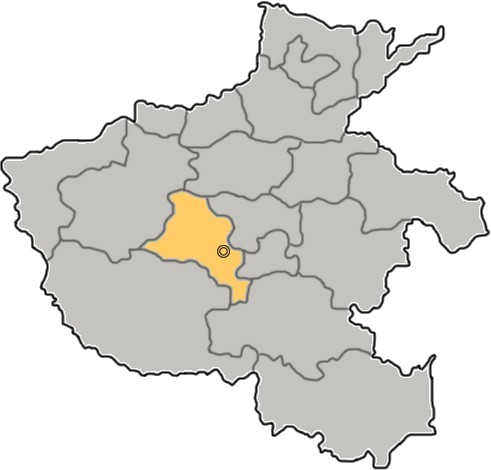
- Pingdingshan in Henan

- Location on the North China Plain Pingdingshan (China)
- Coordinates (Pingdingshan CPPCC): 33°44′12″N 113°17′47″E
- Country: People's Republic of China
- Province: Henan
- Municipal seat: Xinhua District

Government
  - Secretary of Municipal Committee of the CPC: Deng Yongjian

Area
  - Prefecture-level city: 7,874 km^{2} (3,040 sq mi)
  - Urban: 384 km^{2} (148 sq mi)
  - Metro: 1,771 km^{2} (684 sq mi)

Population (2020 census for total, 2010 otherwise)
  - Prefecture-level city: 4,987,137
  - Density: 633.4/km^{2} (1,640/sq mi)
  - Urban: 979,130
  - Urban density: 2,550/km^{2} (6,600/sq mi)
  - Metro: 1,756,333
  - Metro density: 991.7/km^{2} (2,569/sq mi)

GDP
  - Prefecture-level city: CN¥ 182.5 billion US$ 27.5 billion
  - Per capita: CN¥ 36,708; US$ 5,526
- Time zone: UTC+8 (China Standard)
- Postal code: 467000
- Area code: 0375
- ISO 3166 code: CN-HA-04
- Major Nationalities: Han, Hui
- County-level divisions: 10
- Township-level divisions: 124
- License plate prefixes: 豫D
- Website: www.pds.gov.cn

Pingdingshan
- Simplified Chinese: 平顶山
- Traditional Chinese: 平頂山
Transcriptions
Standard Mandarin
- Hanyu Pinyin: Píngdǐngshān

Pingdingshan (simplified Chinese: 平顶山; traditional Chinese: 平頂山; pinyin: Píngdǐngshān), also known as Eagle City (simplified Chinese: 鹰城; traditional Chinese: 鷹城; pinyin: Yīngchéng), is a prefecture-level city in central Henan province, China. It had 4,904,701 inhabitants at the 2010 census whom 1,756,333 lived in the built-up (or metro) area including Ye county being conurbated.

== History ==
In Chinese, Pingdingshan means "mountain with a flat top". The city is named after a nearby plateau, the top of which is very flat. The reason for the nickname of the city "Eagle City" can be traced back to two thousand years ago during the "Spring and Autumn Annals". There was a small country royal named Ying who lived in Pingdingshan area. In ancient times, the word "Ying" had the same pronunciation as Eagle in Chinese, therefore people also called Pingdingshan "Eagle City".

Pingdingshan was established as a prefecture-level city in 1957.

== Geography ==
Pingdingshan borders the provincial capital of Zhengzhou to the north, Xuchang and Luohe to the east, Zhumadian to the southeast, Nanyang to the south, and Luoyang to the west.

The Funiu Mountains run through the west of Pingdingshan, and the North China Plains occupy the city's eastern portion. Mount Yao is located in the city. Over 30 rivers run through the city, and 163 lakes and reservoirs are located in Pingdingshan.

== Climate ==
Climate data for Pingdingshan (Ye County) (1991–2020 normals, extremes 1981–2010)
Month	Jan	Feb	Mar	Apr	May	Jun	Jul	Aug	Sep	Oct	Nov	Dec	Year
Record high °C (°F)	20.1 (68.2)	24.4 (75.9)	28.3 (82.9)	33.7 (92.7)	40.6 (105.1)	40.4 (104.7)	40.8 (105.4)	39.2 (102.6)	39.3 (102.7)	35.1 (95.2)	27.6 (81.7)	20.4 (68.7)	40.8 (105.4)
Mean daily maximum °C (°F)	6.6 (43.9)	10.2 (50.4)	15.5 (59.9)	21.9 (71.4)	27.6 (81.7)	32.0 (89.6)	32.2 (90.0)	30.6 (87.1)	27.1 (80.8)	22.1 (71.8)	14.9 (58.8)	8.7 (47.7)	20.8 (69.4)
Daily mean °C (°F)	1.3 (34.3)	4.3 (39.7)	9.6 (49.3)	15.8 (60.4)	21.4 (70.5)	26.1 (79.0)	27.4 (81.3)	25.9 (78.6)	21.5 (70.7)	16.2 (61.2)	9.3 (48.7)	3.4 (38.1)	15.2 (59.3)
Mean daily minimum °C (°F)	−3.0 (26.6)	−0.4 (31.3)	4.4 (39.9)	10.1 (50.2)	15.6 (60.1)	20.8 (69.4)	23.5 (74.3)	22.3 (72.1)	17.2 (63.0)	11.6 (52.9)	4.7 (40.5)	−0.9 (30.4)	10.5 (50.9)
Record low °C (°F)	−13.5 (7.7)	−14.7 (5.5)	−8.0 (17.6)	−2.9 (26.8)	2.6 (36.7)	11.7 (53.1)	16.8 (62.2)	12.6 (54.7)	7.8 (46.0)	−2.4 (27.7)	−8.1 (17.4)	−14.0 (6.8)	−14.7 (5.5)
Average precipitation mm (inches)	14.9 (0.59)	16.1 (0.63)	33.6 (1.32)	46.4 (1.83)	78.2 (3.08)	108.2 (4.26)	199.2 (7.84)	142.5 (5.61)	84.3 (3.32)	48.4 (1.91)	35.0 (1.38)	12.7 (0.50)	819.5 (32.27)
Average precipitation days (≥ 0.1 mm)	4.6	5.0	6.3	6.7	8.4	8.4	11.9	10.6	9.5	7.1	6.2	4.2	88.9
Average snowy days	3.9	3.0	1.3	0.1	0	0	0	0	0	0	1.0	2.6	11.9
Average relative humidity (%)	65	65	67	68	67	66	79	82	77	70	70	65	70
Mean monthly sunshine hours	114.9	121.9	159.4	186.0	196.6	182.4	177.5	168.1	144.2	139.6	131.6	123.4	1,845.6
Percentage possible sunshine	36	39	43	47	46	42	41	41	39	40	43	40	41
Source: China Meteorological Administration

== Politics ==
=== CCP Municipal Committee Secretary ===
Since July 2021, Zhang Leiming has served as Pingdingshan's Chinese Communist Party Committee Secretary.

=== Mayor ===
Pingdingshan's current mayor is Zhao Wenfeng, who has been serving in the position since July 2021.

From 2003.08 to 2005.04 Wang Zhaoping was the Mayor of Pingdingshan. From 2005.04 to 2008.03 Zhao Qinglin was the Mayor of Pingdingshan. From 2008.03 to 2010.10 Li Endong was the Mayor of Pingdingshan. From 2010.10 to 2013.04 Chen Jiansheng was the Mayor of Pingdingshan. From 2013.04 to January 2018 Zhang Guowei was the Mayor of Pingdingshan. Zhang Leiming, the current CCP Municipal Committee Secretary, had served as the Mayor from January 2018 until July 2021.

== Administration ==
The prefecture-level city of Pingdingshan administers 4 districts, 2 county-level cities and 4 counties.

Administrative divisions	Chinese	Area (km2)	Population	Post code
Xinhua District	新华区	157 km^{2} or 61 sq mi	389,866	467002
Weidong District	卫东区	103 km^{2} or 40 sq mi	302,603	467021
Zhanhe District	湛河区	124 km^{2} or 48 sq mi	286,661	467000
Shilong District	石龙区	35 km^{2} or 14 sq mi	54,912	467045
Ruzhou City	汝州市	1,573 km^{2} or 607 sq mi	927,934	467500
Wugang City	舞钢市	640 km^{2} or 250 sq mi	313,828	462500
Lushan County	鲁山县	2,406 km^{2} or 929 sq mi	789,901	467002
Baofeng County	宝丰县	722 km^{2} or 279 sq mi	490,269	467400
Ye County	叶县	1,387 km^{2} or 536 sq mi	777,203	467200
Jia County	郏县	727 km^{2} or 281 sq mi	571,524	467100

Map
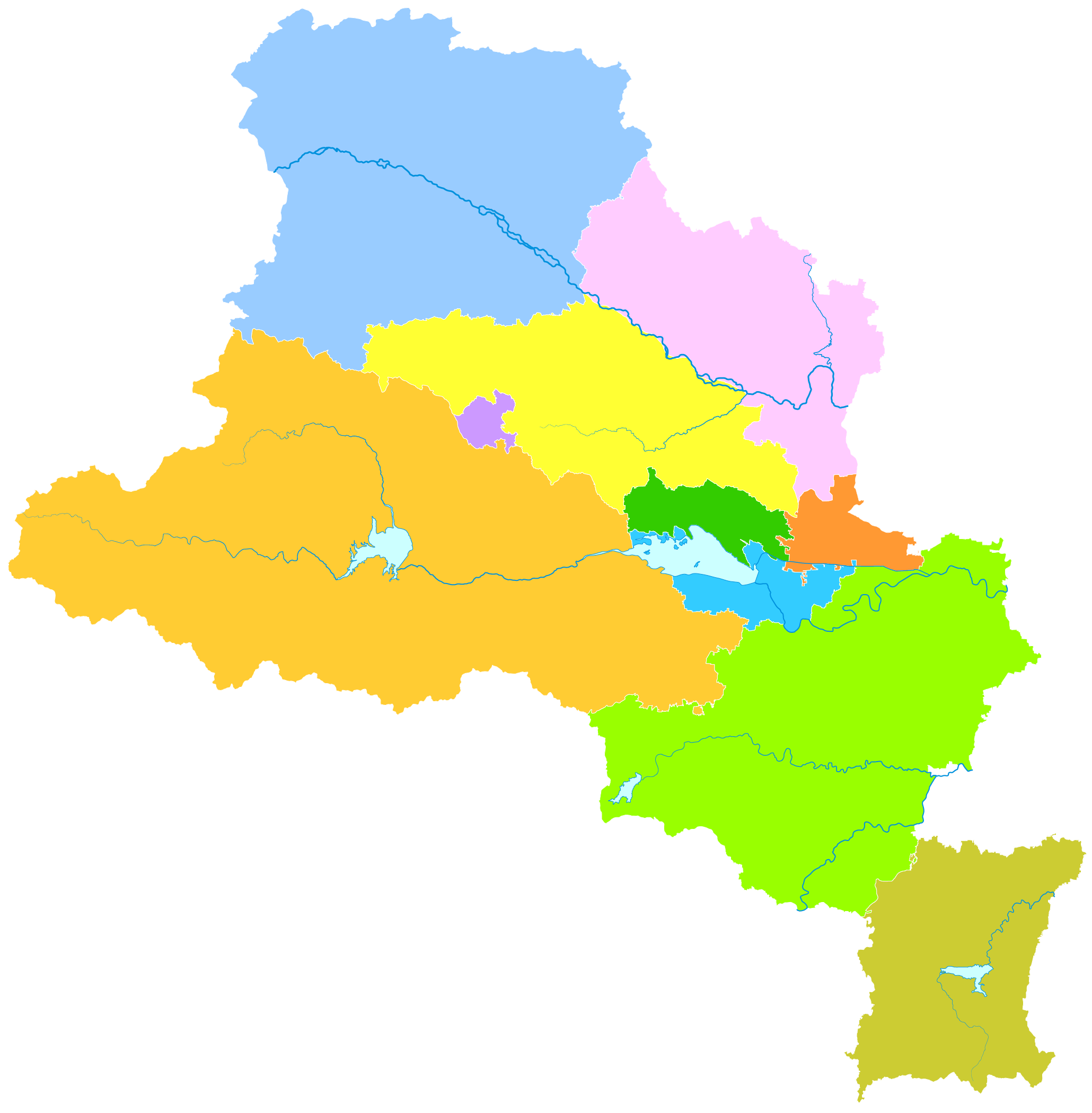

== Demographics ==
Pingdingshan has a permanent population of about 4,987,100 as of 2020.

According to a 2019 publication by the city's government, there are 79,467 people (1.8% of the total population) in Pingdingshan who are ethnic minorities, representing 48 different recognized groups. The largest ethnic minority in Pingdingshan is the Hui people, who number 62,040, accounting for 77.8% of the city's total ethnic minority population. Other sizable ethnic minority populations in Pingdingshan include the Manchus, who number 8,780, and the Mongols, who number 6,096. The remaining 45 ethnic groups account for just 2,551 people. Zhanhe District, Jia County, and Ye County all have over 10,000 people who identify as ethnic minorities. Pingdingshan has two ethnic townships: Mazhuang Hui Ethnic Township in Ye County and Yaozhuang Hui Ethnic Township in Jia County. 48 administrative villages in Pingdingshan have an ethnic minority population of 30% or more, or more than 300 ethnic minorities residing in them. There are 18 schools throughout the city designated for ethnic minorities: 1 Mongol primary school, 15 Hui primary schools, and two Hui secondary schools.

== Economy ==
Pingdingshan's economy has grown rapidly in the 21st century, with the city's gross domestic product (GDP) more than doubling from 112.781 billion renminbi (RMB) in 2009 to 245.584 billion in 2020. Pingdingshan had been identified by the Economist Intelligence Unit in the November 2010 Access China White Paper as a member of the CHAMPS (Chongqing, Hefei, Anshan, Maanshan, Pingdingshan and Shenyang), an economic profile of the top 20 emerging cities in China. The city's economy is largely reliant on its secondary and tertiary sectors, which comprise 110.803 billion RMB (45.12% of total GDP) and 114.318 billion RMB (46.55% of total GDP), respectively. The city's primary sector comprises just 20.464 billion RMB (8.33% of total GDP). The city's tertiary sector has seen particularly rapid growth during this period, growing by about 300% from 2009 to 2020.

Major companies located in Pingdingshan include China Pingmei Shenma Group, Pinggao Group (Chinese: 平高集团), Wugang Company (Chinese: 舞钢公司), and Tianrui Cement.

=== Natural resources ===
Pingdingshan hosts one of the largest coal fields in all of China, and has attracted international attention for its prominent coal mining industry. However, beginning in the latter half of the 2010s, coal production in the city began declining, due to a depletion of the city's coal mines, increased environmental regulations, and a series of high-profile mining accidents. Sodium and iron are mined on a large-scale in Pingdingshan, and other mineral resources include manganese, aluminum, fluorite, and gypsum. Pingdingshan has about 10 billion tons of coal reserves, the largest coalfield area in the South and East of China; well known as "the coal storage of the central area of China". The city also 230 billion tons of salt reserves, ranking first in Henan province, second in China. Henan province houses some of the biggest limestone reserves in China estimated over 24 billion tons, Pindingshan is the cement center for limestone mine production and quarrying in the province. Pingdingshan is very rich in water resources compared to other inland cities. It has Baiguishan Reservoir, Zhaopingtai Reservoir, Yanshan Reservoir, Shimantan Reservoir and Gushitan Reservoir.

== Education ==
=== Colleges and universities ===
- Pingdingshan University
- Henan University of Urban Construction
- Pingdingshan Vocational and Technical College
- Pingdingshan Polytechnic College
- Henan Quality Institute

=== High schools ===
- Pingdingshan No.1 Middle School
- Pingdingshan No.1 High School
- Pingdingshan No.2 Middle School
- Pingdingshan No.2 High School
- Pingdingshan No.3 High School
- Pingdingshan No.8 Middle School
- Pingdingshan Experimental High School
- Lushan No. 1 Middle School

== Religion ==
Pingdingshan has state-sanctioned Buddhist, Taoist, Islamic, Catholic, and Protestant organizations. Officially, there are 78 Buddhist temples, 100 Taoist temples, 70 mosques, 2 Catholic churches, and 104 Protestant churches. On April 25, 1948, Comrade Deng Xiaoping held a joint meeting of the revolutionary committee at the China Gospel Fellowship Church which was used as a memorial hall.

== Tourism ==
- Pingdingshan thrush Valley: A National "AAA" rated scenic spot and a major tourist attraction in Henan. It is named after the many thrushes breeding here. The scenic area is a total of 30 square kilometres (12 sq mi). There are numerous attractions such as cuckoo lake, an area known as "the pocket of the Three Gorges".
- Mount Yao: A national "AAAA" rated scenic spot. Located nearby in Lushan County. Originally known as Yaoshan Shirenshan. Home to the Spring Temple Buddha, the second largest statue in the world, built in 2002.
- Xiangshan Temple
- Qizu Pagoda
- Pingdingshan Museum
- Ruguan Kiln Ruins Museum
- Sansu Tombs
- Ma Street Book Club

== Twin towns – sister cities ==
Pingdingshan, People's Republic of China is twinned with:

- Andong, North Gyeongsang Province, South Korea
- Balneário Camboriú, Santa Catarina, Brazil
- Syzran, Samara Oblast, Russia

== See also ==
- 2009 Henan mine disaster
