= Xinhua, Pingdingshan =

Coordinates: 33°43′55″N 113°17′46″E

Xinhua 新华区
- District
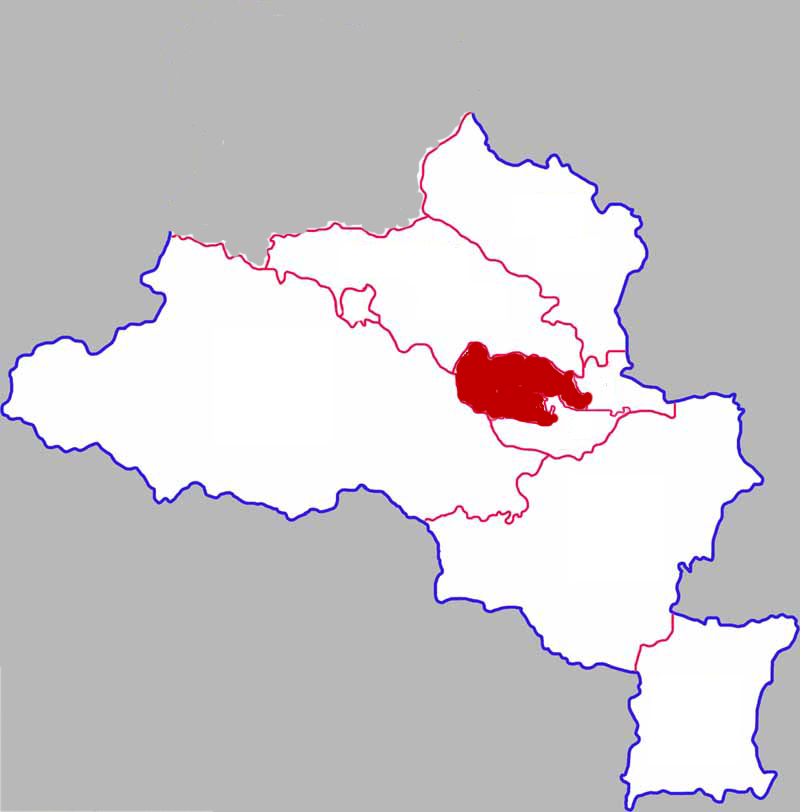
- Location in Pingdingshan

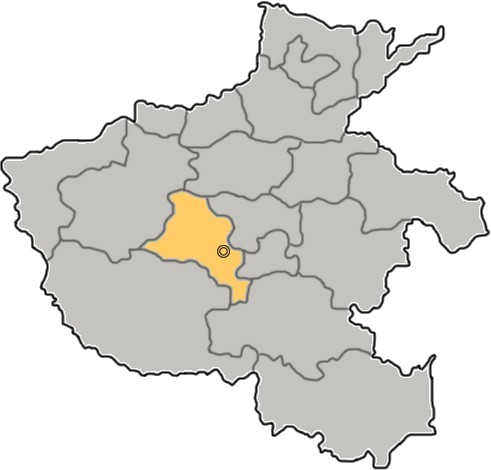
- Pingdingshan in Henan
- Country: People's Republic of China
- Province: Henan
- Prefecture-level city: Pingdingshan

Area
  - Total: 157 km^{2} (61 sq mi)

Population (2019)
  - Total: 409,800
  - Density: 2,610/km^{2} (6,760/sq mi)
- Time zone: UTC+8 (China Standard)
- Postal code: 467002

Xinhua District (simplified Chinese: 新华区; traditional Chinese: 新華區; pinyin: Xīnhuá Qū) is a district and the seat of the city of Pingdingshan, Henan province, China.

== Administrative divisions ==
As of 2012, this district is divided to 10 subdistricts and 2 towns.

Subdistricts

- Shuguangjie Subdistrict (曙光街街道)
- Guangminglu Subdistrict (光明路街道)
- Zhongxinglu Subdistrict (中兴路街道)
- Kuanggonglu Subdistrict (矿工路街道)
- Xishichang Subdistrict (西市场街道)
- Xinxinjie Subdistrict (新新街街道)
- Qingshishan Subdistrict (青石山街道)
- Zhanhebeilu Subdistrict (湛河北路街道)
- Hubinlu Subdistrict (湖滨路街道)
- Xigaohuang Subdistrict (西高皇街道)

Towns

- Jiaodian (焦店镇)
- Zhiyang (滍阳镇)
