= Global Liveability Index =

Ranking of qualities of life

The Global Liveability Index is a yearly assessment published by the Economist Intelligence Unit (EIU), ranking 173 global cities for their quality of life based on assessments of stability, health care, culture and environment, education and infrastructure. Copenhagen was ranked the most liveable city in 2025, while Damascus was ranked the least liveable. Cities from the Western world dominate the top 10, reflecting their widespread availability of goods and services, low personal risk, and effective infrastructure.

== Methodology ==
- Category 1: Stability (weighted 25% of total)
  - Prevalence of summary offense
  - Prevalence of violent crime
  - Threat of terrorism
  - Threat of war
  - Threat of civil disorder
- Category 2: Healthcare (20%)
  - Availability of private health care
  - Quality of private healthcare
  - Availability of publicly funded health care
  - Quality of publicly funded health care
  - Availability of over-the-counter drug
  - World Bank's general health care indicators
- Category 3: Culture & Environment (25%)
  - Humidity, temperature rating
  - Discomfort of climate to travelers
  - Transparency International's level of corruption
  - Social or religious restrictions
  - Level of censorship
  - Sporting availability from 3 sport indicators
  - Cultural availability from 4 cultural indicators
  - Food and drink from 4 cultural indicators
  - Consumer goods and services from product availability
- Category 4: Education (10%)
  - Availability of private education
  - Quality of private education
  - World Bank's state school indicators
- Category 5: Infrastructure (20%)
  - Street network quality
  - Public transport quality
  - International transportation service quality
  - Availability of good quality housing
  - Energy provision quality
  - Water provision quality
  - Telecommunications quality

== 2026 ==
Global Liveability Index 2026: Top 10
Rank	City	Country	Index
1	Copenhagen	Denmark	98.0
2	Vienna	Austria	97.1
3	Melbourne	Australia	97.0
4	Sydney	Australia	96.6
5	Zurich	Switzerland	96.4
6	Geneva	Switzerland	96.1
7	Osaka	Japan	96.0
8	Adelaide	Australia	95.9
9	Vancouver	Canada	95.8
10	Tokyo	Japan	95.7

== 2025 ==
Global Liveability Index 2025: Top 10
Rank	City	Country	Index	Stability	Healthcare	Culture and environment	Education	Infrastructure
1	Copenhagen	Denmark	98.0	100.0	95.8	95.4	100.0	100.0
2	Vienna	Austria	97.1	95.0	100.0	93.5	100.0	100.0
2	Zurich	Switzerland	97.1	95.0	100.0	96.3	100.0	96.4
4	Melbourne	Australia	97.0	95.0	100.0	95.8	100.0	96.4
5	Geneva	Switzerland	96.8	95.0	100.0	94.9	100.0	96.4
6	Sydney	Australia	96.6	95.0	100.0	94.4	100.0	96.4
7	Osaka	Japan	96.0	100.0	100.0	86.8	100.0	96.4
7	Auckland	New Zealand	96.0	95.0	95.8	97.9	100.0	92.9
9	Adelaide	Australia	95.9	95.0	100.0	91.4	100.0	96.4
10	Vancouver	Canada	95.8	95.0	95.8	97.2	100.0	92.9

== 2024 ==
Global Liveability Index 2024: Top 10
Sl.	City	Ratings	Country
1	Vienna	98.9	Austria
2	Copenhagen	98.0	Denmark
3	Zurich	97.1	Switzerland
4	Melbourne	97.0	Australia
5	Calgary	96.8	Canada
5	Geneva	96.8	Switzerland
7	Sydney	96.6	Australia
7	Vancouver	96.6	Canada
9	Osaka	96.0	Japan
9	Auckland	96.0	New Zealand

== 2023 ==
Global Liveability Index 2023: Top 10
Sl.	City	Ratings	Country
1	Vienna	98.4	Austria
2	Copenhagen	98.0	Denmark
3	Melbourne	97.4	Australia
4	Sydney	97.4	Australia
5	Vancouver	97.3	Canada
6	Zurich	97.1	Switzerland
7	Calgary	96.8	Canada
7	Geneva	96.8	Switzerland
9	Toronto	96.5	Canada
10	Osaka	96.0	Japan
10	Auckland	96.0	New Zealand

== 2022 ==
Global Liveability Index 2022: Top 10
Sl.	City	Ratings	Country
1	Vienna	98.4	Austria
2	Copenhagen	98.0	Denmark
3	Zurich	96.3	Switzerland
3	Calgary	96.3	Canada
5	Vancouver	96.1	Canada
6	Geneva	95.9	Switzerland
7	Frankfurt	95.7	Germany
8	Toronto	95.4	Canada
9	Amsterdam	95.3	Netherlands
10	Melbourne	95.1	Australia
10	Osaka	95.1	Japan

== 2021 ==
Global Liveability Index 2021: Top 10
Sl.	City	Ratings	Country
1	Auckland	96.9	New Zealand
2	Osaka	94.2	Japan
3	Adelaide	94.0	Australia
4	Wellington	93.7	New Zealand
4	Tokyo	93.7	Japan
6	Perth	93.3	Australia
7	Zurich	92.8	Switzerland
8	Geneva	92.5	Switzerland
8	Melbourne	92.5	Australia
10	Brisbane	92.4	Australia

== 2020 ==
Global Liveability Index 2020
Country	City	Rank	Overall Rating (100=ideal)	Stability	Healthcare	Culture & Environment	Education	Infrastructure
Austria	Vienna	1	94.4	100	100	81	91.7	100
Japan	Osaka	2	93.9	100	100	81.9	91.7	96.4
Japan	Tokyo	3	93.2	100	100	81.9	91.7	92.9
Canada	Calgary	3	93.2	100	100	76.2	91.7	100
Switzerland	Zurich	5	92.3	95	100	83.8	83.3	96.4
New Zealand	Auckland	6	92.2	95	95.8	86.1	91.7	92.9
Switzerland	Geneva	7	92.1	95	100	83.1	83.3	96.4
Australia	Adelaide	8	91.5	95	100	77.1	91.7	96.4
Canada	Vancouver	8	91.5	95	100	79.9	91.7	92.9
Canada	Toronto	10	91.3	100	100	77.1	91.7	89.3
Germany	Frankfurt	10	91.3	90	100	81.9	83.3	100
Australia	Perth	12	90.6	95	100	70.8	91.7	100
Germany	Hamburg	13	90.4	90	100	78.2	83.3	100
Germany	Berlin	14	90.1	85	100	81.9	83.3	100
New Zealand	Wellington	15	89.8	95	91.7	82.6	91.7	89.3
Luxembourg	Luxembourg	16	89.5	95	100	78.7	75	92.9
Australia	Brisbane	17	89.3	95	100	77.1	91.7	85.7
Germany	Munich	18	89.2	90	100	81.9	83.3	89.3
Australia	Sydney	19	88.9	95	100	63.9	91.7	100
Denmark	Copenhagen	20	88.8	95	79.2	80.1	91.7	100
Canada	Montreal	21	88.7	95	100	68.8	91.7	92.9
Finland	Helsinki	22	88.5	100	83.3	76.9	83.3	96.4
Germany	Düsseldorf	22	88.5	90	100	80.3	66.7	96.4
Australia	Melbourne	24	87.5	95	100	58.3	91.7	100
Singapore	Singapore	24	87.5	95	91.7	64.8	91.7	100
Netherlands	Amsterdam	26	87.3	90	83.3	81.9	83.3	96.4
Hungary	Budapest	26	87.3	90	91.7	76.4	91.7	91.1
Norway	Oslo	28	87.1	95	79.2	76.9	83.3	100
Ireland	Dublin	29	86.5	90	91.7	76.2	91.7	87.5
Iceland	Reykjavík	30	86.3	95	95.8	71.5	83.3	85.7
France	Paris	31	85.6	80	83.3	81.9	91.7	96.4
Italy	Milan	31	85.6	85	87.5	79.2	91.7	89.3
France	Lyon	33	84.9	90	83.3	75	91.7	89.3
Belgium	Brussels	33	84.9	85	83.3	76.9	91.7	92.9
Sweden	Stockholm	35	84.6	95	62.5	79.4	91.7	96.4
Italy	Rome	36	83.8	75	87.5	79.2	91.7	92.9
United Kingdom	Manchester	37	83.3	90	75	81.3	83.3	85.7
Spain	Barcelona	38	82.8	85	66.7	79.2	91.7	96.4
Hong Kong	Hong Kong	39	81.8	85	87.5	58.3	91.7	96.4
United States	Atlanta	40	81.7	90	58.3	79.2	91.7	92.9
South Korea	Seoul	41	81.5	80	83.3	71.1	91.7	89.3
Taiwan	Taipei	41	81.5	90	83.3	64.1	91.7	85.7
United Kingdom	London	43	81.4	75	75	82.6	91.7	89.3
Spain	Madrid	44	81.3	85	62.5	79.2	91.7	92.9
Czech Republic	Prague	45	80.8	85	79.2	74.8	75	87.5
Portugal	Lisbon	46	80	85	70.8	80.6	83.3	80.4
United States	Pittsburgh	47	79.9	85	58.3	74.1	91.7	96.4
New Caledonia	Nouméa	47	79.9	100	87.5	67.4	66.7	69.6
United States	Chicago	49	79.2	80	58.3	79.2	91.7	92.9
United States	Seattle	50	79	75	58.3	80.6	91.7	96.4
United States	San Francisco	50	79	85	58.3	79.2	91.7	85.7
United States	Washington, D.C.	52	78.7	75	58.3	79.2	91.7	96.4
United States	Miami	52	78.7	85	58.3	72.2	91.7	92.9
United States	Boston	52	78.7	75	58.3	79.2	91.7	96.4
United States	Minneapolis	55	77.8	85	58.3	68.5	91.7	92.9
United States	Cleveland	56	77.6	80	58.3	75.5	91.7	89.3
Chile	Santiago	57	77.3	80	70.8	73.8	75	85.7
Slovakia	Bratislava	57	77.3	90	75	66.7	66.7	82.1
Uruguay	Montevideo	59	76.7	75	83.3	72.5	75	78.6
United States	Honolulu	60	76.4	95	58.3	47.2	91.7	100
Russia	Moscow	60	76.4	75	87.5	58.6	83.3	85.7
United States	Houston	62	76.2	80	54.2	76.4	91.7	85.7
United States	Los Angeles	63	76	70	58.3	79.2	91.7	89.3
Poland	Warsaw	64	75.8	85	75	65.7	66.7	82.1
Argentina	Buenos Aires	65	74.9	70	79.2	61.1	91.7	85.7
United States	Lexington	66	74.3	85	54.2	69.9	83.3	82.1
United Arab Emirates	Dubai	67	73.4	90	66.7	52.5	58.3	92.9
United States	Detroit	68	73.3	65	58.3	73.6	91.7	89.3
United Arab Emirates	Abu Dhabi	69	73.2	90	70.8	48.4	58.3	92.9
Russia	Saint Petersburg	70	73.1	70	87.5	58.6	66.7	83.9
United States	New York	71	72.8	60	58.3	76.4	91.7	89.3
Greece	Athens	72	72	75	70.8	68.1	66.7	76.8
China	Suzhou	73	71.8	85	70.8	53.5	58.3	85.7
China	Beijing	74	71.2	75	66.7	57.9	75	85.7
China	Tianjin	75	70.9	85	66.7	53.2	58.3	85.7
China	Shanghai	76	70.1	75	66.7	62.7	66.7	78.6
Malaysia	Kuala Lumpur	77	70	80	62.5	52.3	83.3	80.4
Bulgaria	Sofia	78	69.5	80	75	64.4	66.7	58.9
China	Shenzhen	79	68.6	80	62.5	52.5	58.3	85.7
Israel	Tel Aviv	80	66.9	50	79.2	56.5	83.3	80.4
Serbia	Belgrade	81	66.5	75	62.5	60.2	66.7	67.9
Romania	Bucharest	81	66.5	80	54.2	60.6	58.3	73.2
China	Dalian	83	66.3	80	62.5	51.9	58.3	75
Kuwait	Kuwait City	84	66.2	80	54.2	43.1	75	85.7
Qatar	Doha	85	66	80	62.5	49.8	75	67.9
China	Guangzhou	85	66	75	62.5	51.4	58.3	80.4
Puerto Rico	San Juan	87	64.7	90	45.8	54.6	58.3	67.9
South Africa	Johannesburg	87	64.7	55	54.2	77.8	75	66.1
Oman	Muscat	89	64.6	80	54.2	36.3	75	85.7
Costa Rica	San José	90	63.5	75	54.2	61.8	66.7	58.9
South Africa	Pretoria	91	63.2	50	54.2	75	75	67.9
China	Qingdao	92	63	80	58.3	51.2	50	67.9
Thailand	Bangkok	93	62.4	55	62.5	52.3	91.7	69.6
Brunei	Bandar Seri Begawan	94	62.1	85	66.7	32.6	58.3	67.9
Brazil	Rio de Janeiro	95	61.8	60	50	63	75	67.9
Brazil	São Paulo	96	61.1	60	54.2	65	58.3	66.1
Jordan	Amman	97	60.7	65	70.8	47.2	66.7	58.9
Kazakhstan	Almaty	98	60.6	75	66.7	42.1	58.3	60.7
Peru	Lima	99	59.3	60	37.5	53.7	83.3	75
Bahrain	Manama	100	58.1	60	50	38.9	83.3	75
Panama	Panama City	101	57.7	75	25	54.4	75	64.3
Paraguay	Asunción	102	57.4	55	50	60	58.3	64.3
Philippines	Manila	103	57.3	60	58.3	47.9	58.3	64.3
Saudi Arabia	Riyadh	104	56.6	70	66.7	28.9	50	67.9
Tunisia	Tunis	105	56.4	50	66.7	50.2	58.3	60.7
Azerbaijan	Baku	106	56	65	66.7	39.1	66.7	50
Ecuador	Quito	106	56	50	41.7	62.7	66.7	64.3
Mexico	Mexico City	108	55.7	40	66.7	65.7	66.7	46.4
Vietnam	Hanoi	109	55.5	70	54.2	41	58.3	55.4
Saudi Arabia	Jeddah	110	54.6	65	62.5	26.2	50	71.4
Morocco	Casablanca	111	54.1	65	41.7	49.3	50	60.7
Turkey	Istanbul	112	54	50	50	51.9	50	67.9
Vietnam	Ho Chi Minh City	113	53.2	70	50	38.2	58.3	51.8
Ukraine	Kyiv	114	53	50	58.3	51.6	66.7	46.4
Saudi Arabia	Khobar	115	52.1	65	62.5	28.9	50	55.4
Indonesia	Jakarta	116	51.7	60	45.8	41	58.3	57.1
Uzbekistan	Tashkent	117	51.5	50	58.3	44.2	66.7	48.2
Colombia	Bogotá	118	51.4	35	45.8	59.3	58.3	64.3
Kenya	Nairobi	119	49.6	45	41.7	56.7	58.3	50
India	New Delhi	120	48.1	50	41.7	35.4	66.7	58.9
India	Mumbai	121	47.9	60	41.7	33.3	58.3	51.8
Egypt	Cairo	122	47.8	55	45.8	40	41.7	53.6
Cambodia	Phnom Penh	123	47.7	60	37.5	41	50	50
Guatemala	Guatemala City	124	47.6	55	37.5	42.6	50	53.6
Ivory Coast	Abidjan	125	47.5	50	45.8	43.8	41.7	53.6
Sri Lanka	Colombo	126	47.4	55	41.7	36.6	58.3	51.8
Zambia	Lusaka	127	47.1	55	33.3	49.3	33.3	55.4
Iran	Tehran	128	46.3	55	62.5	31.9	41.7	39.3
Nepal	Kathmandu	129	44.2	65	29.2	35.4	50	41.1
Venezuela	Caracas	130	42.7	35	33.3	42.8	58.3	53.6
Senegal	Dakar	131	41.8	50	29.2	47.2	41.7	37.5
Cameroon	Douala	132	40.9	60	25	39.4	25	42.9
Zimbabwe	Harare	133	39.6	40	20.8	50	58.3	35.7
Pakistan	Karachi	134	38.7	20	45.8	33.3	58.3	51.8
Papua New Guinea	Port Moresby	135	37.9	30	37.5	38	41.7	46.4
Algeria	Algiers	136	37	35	45.8	35.4	41.7	30.4
Libya	Tripoli	137	36.7	30	41.7	33.8	41.7	41.1
Nigeria	Lagos	138	34.1	20	37.5	39.1	25	46.4
Bangladesh	Dhaka	139	33	55	16.7	28.9	33.3	26.8
Syria	Damascus	140	28	20	29.2	33.1	25	32.1

== 2019 ==
Global Liveability Index 2019: Top 10
Sl.	City	Ratings	Country
1	Vienna	99.1	Austria
2	Melbourne	98.4	Australia
3	Sydney	98.1	Australia
4	Osaka	97.7	Japan
5	Calgary	97.5	Canada
6	Vancouver	97.3	Canada
7	Tokyo	97.2	Japan
7	Toronto	97.2	Canada
9	Copenhagen	96.8	Denmark
10	Adelaide	96.6	Australia

== 2018 ==
Global Liveability Index 2018: Top 10
Sl.	City	Ratings	Country
1	Vienna	99.1	Austria
2	Melbourne	98.4	Australia
3	Osaka	97.7	Japan
4	Calgary	97.5	Canada
5	Sydney	97.4	Australia
6	Vancouver	97.3	Canada
7	Tokyo	97.2	Japan
7	Toronto	97.2	Canada
9	Copenhagen	96.8	Denmark
10	Adelaide	96.6	Australia

== 2017 ==
Global Liveability Index 2017: Top 10
Sl	City	Ratings	Country
1	Melbourne	97.5	Australia
2	Vienna	97.4	Austria
3	Vancouver	97.3	Canada
4	Toronto	97.2	Canada
5	Adelaide	96.6	Australia
5	Calgary	96.6	Canada
7	Perth	95.9	Australia
8	Auckland	95.7	New Zealand
9	Helsinki	95.6	Finland
10	Hamburg	95	Germany

== 2016 ==
Global Liveability Index 2016: Top 10
Sl.	City	Ratings	Country
1	Melbourne	97.5	Australia
2	Vienna	97.4	Austria
3	Vancouver	97.3	Canada
4	Toronto	97.2	Canada
5	Adelaide	96.6	Australia
5	Calgary	96.6	Canada
7	Perth	95.9	Australia
8	Auckland	95.7	New Zealand
9	Helsinki	95.6	Finland
10	Hamburg	95	Germany

== 2015 ==
Global Liveability Index 2015: Top 10
Sl.	City	Ratings	Country
1	Melbourne	97.5	Australia
2	Vienna	97.4	Austria
3	Vancouver	97.3	Canada
4	Toronto	97.2	Canada
5	Adelaide	96.6	Australia
5	Calgary	96.6	Canada
7	Sydney	96.1	Australia
8	Perth	95.9	Australia
9	Auckland	95.7	New Zealand
10	Helsinki	95.6	Finland
10	Zurich	95.6	Switzerland

== See also ==
- Where-to-be-born Index
