= Economist Intelligence Unit =

Research and analysis division of Economist Group

Economist Intelligence Unit Limited
- Type: Business unit
- Founded: 1946
- Headquarters: London, England
- Products: Forecasting, economic research and analysis
- Parent: Economist Group
- Subsidiaries: Bazian, Clearstate, Canback Consulting
- Website: www.eiu.com

The Economist Intelligence Unit (EIU) is the research and analysis division of the British media company The Economist Group, providing forecasting and advisory services through research and analysis, such as monthly country reports, five-year country economic forecasts, country risk service reports, and industry reports. The EIU provides country, industry, and management analysis worldwide and incorporates the former Business International Corporation, a UK company acquired by its parent company in 1986. The EIU has its main offices in four cities—London, New York, Hong Kong and Dubai.

The Managing Director of the EIU is Leon Calvert, who was appointed in April 2025. The former MD was Robin Bew, formerly the Editorial Director and Chief Economist.

== Acquisitions ==
=== Bazian ===
In December 2012, the Economist Intelligence Unit acquired Bazian, which specialises in the analysis and supply of clinical evidence on health services, treatment, and health technologies to assess clinical effectiveness and value for money. Headquartered in London, Bazian was founded by Vivek Muthu and Anna Donald in 1999.

=== Clearstate ===
In April 2012, the Economist Intelligence Unit acquired Clearstate, a market intelligence firm offering customised strategic advisory and primary research specifically addressing the healthcare and life sciences domains within the Asia Pacific. Clearstate was founded in 2006 and is headquartered in Singapore.

=== Canback ===
In July 2015, the Economist Intelligence Unit acquired Canback & Company, a global management consulting firm serving primarily consumer-facing industries and leveraging predictive analytics. It was founded in 2004 and was headquartered in Boston. It was folded into the EIU in 2020.

== Reports ==
=== CHAMPS ===
In November 2010, the Economist Intelligence Unit released the Access China White Paper profiling the economies of the top 20 emerging cities in China, directed by Stephen Dollard, China Forecasting, for the Economist Intelligence Unit. It was created to support a report conducted by the Economist Intelligence Unit's Access China Service, "CHAMPS: China’s fastest-growing cities". These cities are favoured for several reasons, including the breadth of business opportunities available, the ongoing construction boom, rising home and vehicle ownership and spending on personal appliances. The report coined the acronym CHAMPS (Chongqing, Hefei, Anshan, Maanshan, Pingdingshan and Shenyang).

=== Democracy Index ===
In 2006 (with updates in 2008, 2010 and every year since), the Economist Intelligence Unit has released the Democracy Index, an index compiled by examining the state of democracy in 167 countries, attempting to quantify this with an Index of Democracy focusing on five general categories—electoral process and pluralism, civil liberties, functioning of government, political participation and political culture. The Democracy Index and the V-Dem Democracy Indices are two of the most widely used democracy indices worldwide.

=== Government Broadband Index ===
In January 2011, the Unit released the Government Broadband Index (gBBi), which assesses countries on the basis of government planning, as opposed to current broadband capability. With ambitious targets for both the speed and coverage of next-generation broadband networks, the developed countries of Southeast Asia scored highest. According to the index, Greece is the worst-performing country measured, due to its relatively low coverage target and drawn-out deployment schedule. Greece also suffers due to the considerable size of its public-funding commitment as a percentage of overall government budget revenues, and because its plan does little to encourage competition.

== Products ==
=== Market Explorer ===
In November 2015, the Economist Intelligence Unit, in collaboration with Canback, introduced Market Explorer, an analytical online tool designed to scan national and municipal markets worldwide to help businesses evaluate and identify target locations for specific products or services.

== See also ==
- Consensus Economics
- E-readiness
- Global Liveability Ranking
- Quality-of-Life Index
