= CHAMPS (China) =

Acronym for the top 20 emerging cities in China

CHAMPS (Chongqing, Hefei, Anshan, Ma'anshan, Pingdingshan and Shenyang) is an acronym that represents the top 20 emerging cities in China. It was coined in October 2010 by Stephen Joske, Director, China Forecasting, for the Economist Intelligence Unit. It was created to support a report conducted by the Economist Intelligence Unit's Access China Service, 'CHAMPS: China's fastest-growing cities'. These cities are favoured for several reasons, including the breadth of business opportunities available, the ongoing construction boom, rising home and vehicle ownership and spending on personal appliances.

== Etymology ==
The acronym was coined by Stephen Joske, Director, China Forecasting, for the Economist Intelligence Unit, and was released to the public along with a detailed report and accompanying infographic in November 2010. Although the term only uses six of the top 20 emerging cities, it represents all twenty.

=== Cities used in the acronym ===
- Chongqing Municipality
- Hefei, Anhui
- Anshan, Liaoning
- Ma'anshan, Anhui
- Pingdingshan, Henan
- Shenyang, Liaoning

== Implications ==
The report was created by taking a look at China's 287 prefecture-level cities and forecasting their respective populations using a unique methodology that adjusts for urbanisation and flows of migrant labour within China. They checked all cities with a population of less than 1 million by 2014, and ranked the remaining 86 cities by a variety of growth measures, including their own forecasts of population and real GDP growth to create the finalised top 20 emerging cities.

The cities that are part of this group are considered to be very promising because over the next decade, their population will grow by approximately 30% to 85 million, making central China a global hotspot for business opportunity. The CHAMPS highlight the breadth of business opportunities available, fuelled by the ongoing construction boom, rising home and vehicle ownership, and spending on personal appliances.

== April 2011 report ==
On April 6, 2011, the Economist Intelligence Unit’s Access China service produced a report on the demand for housing in China over the next decade. ‘Building Rome in a day: The sustainability of China’s housing boom’ forecasts the population and average income in nearly 300 Chinese cities, and the implications of this for housing demand. The report states that ‘with China’s property market being an important global economic indicator, China’s housing boom will present opportunities for investors in sectors such as furniture, cars and building materials.’

== See also ==
- Real estate in China
- Reform and opening
- 2020–2022 Chinese property sector crisis
