= Qizu Pagoda =

Building in Ruzhou, Henan, China

The Qizu Pagoda (Chinese: 七祖塔; pinyin: qīzǔ tǎ), located at Fengxue Temple (风穴寺) of Ruzhou, Henan province, China is a stone, multi-eaved Chinese pagoda built in 738 during the Tang dynasty. The pagoda was built in honor of a Buddhist monk, while the name of the structure was given by Emperor Xuanzong of Tang himself.

This brick pagoda is located behind the main hall of the temple. It has nine stories, is 27 m (88.5 ft) tall (including the crowning spire), and has a square base. The outstretching eaves of the pagoda form an inverse curve, indicative of pagodas built during the early Tang dynasty. Its design style is comparable to the Xumi Pagoda built a century earlier.
