= Guanghua Temple =

Guanghua Temple may refer to:

- Guanghua Temple (Putian), built during the Southern Chen dynasty (557–589 CE) century in Putian, Fujian, China
- Guanghua Temple (Beijing), built during the Yuan dynasty (1279–1368 CE) in Beijing, China
