= Ruzhou =

County-level city in Henan, China

Ruzhou 汝州市
- County-level & Sub-prefectural city
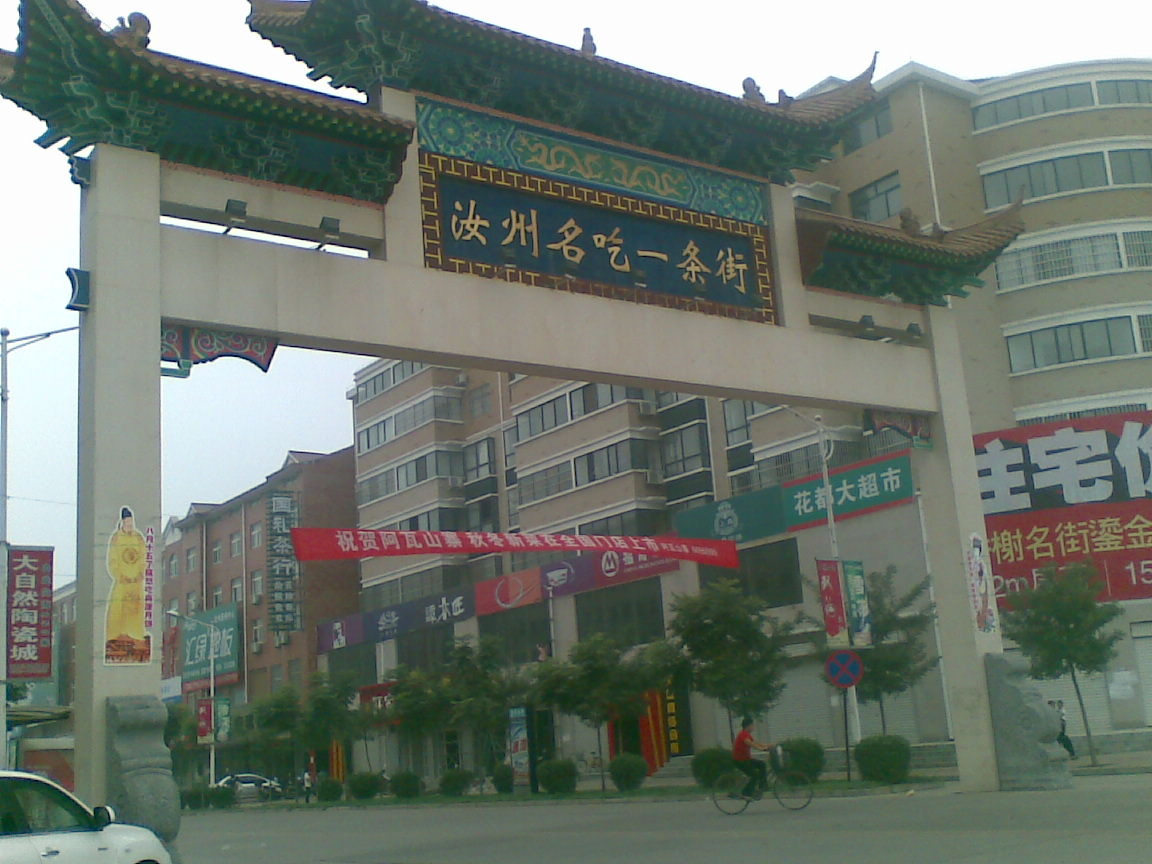

- Location in Henan
- Coordinates: 34°10′01″N 112°50′38″E
- Country: People's Republic of China
- Province: Henan
- Prefecture-level city: Pingdingshan

Area
  - Total: 1,573 km^{2} (607 sq mi)

Population (2019)
  - Total: 968,400
- Time zone: UTC+8 (China Standard)
- Postal code: 467599

Ruzhou (Chinese: 汝州; pinyin: Rǔzhōu) is a county-level city in the west-central part of Henan province, China, and is under the administration of Pingdingshan. It has more than 940,000 inhabitants. It is nationally known for its Ru ware porcelain.

== Geography ==
Ruzhou covers an area of 1,573 square kilometres (607 sq mi). It is located in the valley between Song and Funiu Mountains in the north and east respectively. The Beiru River, a tributary of the Ru River, flows eastwards through the city.

== Name ==
Ruzhou derives its name from the nearby Ru River. Other names used during the early dynasties of China, sometimes still used as epithets, are Rushang (Chinese: 汝上; lit. 'Above Ru [River]'), Ruhai (汝海; 'Ru Sea'), Ruchuan (汝川; 'Ru River'), and Rufan (汝濆; 'Ru Banks').

Between 1913 and 1988, it was known as Linru County (simplified Chinese: 临汝县; traditional Chinese: 臨汝縣; pinyin: Línrǔ Xiàn), after Ruzhou's former administrative seat, also named after the river.

== History ==
During the Eastern Zhou dynasty, the area of modern-day Ruzhou was part of the royal domain directly under the king. In the early Warring States period, Ruzhou, as Rushang, was part of the Zheng state, with Liangcheng as it administrative seat. Rushang caame under the Han state in 375 BCE after it conquered the Zheng state, renaming it to Nanliang. During the Qin dynasty, it was part of Sanchuan Commandery. Ruzhou was established as a settlement in 605 during the Sui dynasty.

Ruzhou was one of the first towns in Henan chosen to participate in paramount leader Deng Xiaoping's second waves reform and opening up in 1993.

=== 2004 stabbing ===
On the night of 25-26 November 2004, nine students were murdered in a break-in at the male dormitory of Ruzhou No. 2 High School. Eight were killed at the scene while another died at a hospital. The perpetrator, 21-year-old Yan Yanming, was arrested when his mother connected him to the attack following Yan's suicide attempt the day after. No motive was given and he was executed on 18 January 2005. The killing was internationally reported as an example of rising school violence.

== Culture ==
The Fengxue Temple of Ruzhou features the Qizu Pagoda, built in 738 during the Tang dynasty (618–907). The town is best well known for Ru ware, one of the Five Great Kilns during the Song dynasty period. Between 23-26 September 2010, the First China (International) Ru Porcelain Cultural Festival was held in Ruzhou. Ru ware is one of "Ruzhou’s Four Wonders", along with Ru jade stone (汝石), Ru calligraphy tiē (汝帖), and Ru earthenware (汝陶). The Ruzhou Ru Porcelain Museum, opened in 1985, is where the most Ru ware is located. Structures such as the Fengxue Temple, Faxingsi Pagoda and Ruzhou Confucian Temple are recognised as national cultural heritage by the State Council.

== Administrative divisions ==
As of 2012, this city is divided to 5 subdistricts, 4 towns and 11 townships.

Subdistricts

- Meishan Subdistrict (煤山街道)
- Fengxue Road Subdistrict (风穴路街道)
- Zhonglou Subdistrict (钟楼街道)
- Xi'erhe Subdistrict (洗耳河街道)
- Runan Subdistrict (汝南街道)

Towns

- Jiliao (寄料镇)
- Wenquan (温泉镇)
- Linru (临汝镇)
- Xiaotun (小屯镇)

Townships

- Yanglou Township (杨楼乡)
- Mangchuan Township (蟒川乡)
- Wangzhai Township (王寨乡)
- Lingtou Township (陵头乡)
- Miaoxia Township (庙下乡)
- Zhifang Township (纸坊乡)
- Shangzhuang Township (尚庄乡)
- Qiling Township (骑岭乡)
- Dayu Township (大峪乡)
- Xiadian Township (夏店乡)
- Jiaocun Township (焦村乡)

== Climate ==
Climate data for Ruzhou, elevation 203 m (666 ft), (1991–2020 normals, extremes 1981–2010)
Month	Jan	Feb	Mar	Apr	May	Jun	Jul	Aug	Sep	Oct	Nov	Dec	Year
Record high °C (°F)	21.2 (70.2)	25.3 (77.5)	28.8 (83.8)	36.0 (96.8)	38.3 (100.9)	41.2 (106.2)	40.0 (104.0)	38.9 (102.0)	39.4 (102.9)	34.3 (93.7)	27.4 (81.3)	24.1 (75.4)	41.2 (106.2)
Mean daily maximum °C (°F)	6.7 (44.1)	10.1 (50.2)	15.6 (60.1)	22.4 (72.3)	27.5 (81.5)	31.9 (89.4)	32.2 (90.0)	30.8 (87.4)	26.7 (80.1)	21.8 (71.2)	14.7 (58.5)	8.8 (47.8)	20.8 (69.4)
Daily mean °C (°F)	1.5 (34.7)	4.5 (40.1)	9.7 (49.5)	16.2 (61.2)	21.5 (70.7)	26.1 (79.0)	27.4 (81.3)	26.0 (78.8)	21.4 (70.5)	16.0 (60.8)	9.2 (48.6)	3.6 (38.5)	15.3 (59.5)
Mean daily minimum °C (°F)	−2.7 (27.1)	0.0 (32.0)	4.6 (40.3)	10.4 (50.7)	15.8 (60.4)	20.6 (69.1)	23.4 (74.1)	22.1 (71.8)	17.2 (63.0)	11.5 (52.7)	4.7 (40.5)	−0.6 (30.9)	10.6 (51.1)
Record low °C (°F)	−15.5 (4.1)	−15.8 (3.6)	−6.0 (21.2)	−1.5 (29.3)	3.3 (37.9)	11.6 (52.9)	15.8 (60.4)	13.5 (56.3)	7.9 (46.2)	−1.3 (29.7)	−6.3 (20.7)	−9.8 (14.4)	−15.8 (3.6)
Average precipitation mm (inches)	10.0 (0.39)	12.3 (0.48)	22.9 (0.90)	38.0 (1.50)	57.6 (2.27)	67.0 (2.64)	118.7 (4.67)	95.6 (3.76)	78.0 (3.07)	41.4 (1.63)	27.4 (1.08)	8.6 (0.34)	577.5 (22.73)
Average precipitation days (≥ 0.1 mm)	4.0	4.5	6.0	6.7	7.9	8.2	11.0	11.1	9.3	7.0	5.7	3.7	85.1
Average snowy days	4.3	3.0	1.2	0.1	0	0	0	0	0	0	1.0	3.0	12.6
Average relative humidity (%)	55	58	59	61	61	62	75	77	73	65	62	55	64
Mean monthly sunshine hours	142.7	142.4	174.1	202.2	217.1	210.2	190.3	181.9	158.4	164.5	146.3	152.0	2,082.1
Percentage possible sunshine	45	46	47	51	50	49	44	44	43	47	47	50	47
Source: China Meteorological Administration

== Education ==
- Pingdingshan No.2 Senior High School
- Ruzhou Wangzhai Country Shangzhai Primary School
- Ruzhou Wangzhai Country Joint Middle School
- Ruzhou Wangzhai Country Qiezhuang Primary School
- Ruzhou No. 9 Junior Middle School
- Ruzhou Yanglou Township No. 3 Junior High School
- Ruzhou Yanglou Town Shitai Primary School
- Ruzhou Zhonglou Street Office Erlidian Primary School

== Transportation ==
- China National Highway 207
