= Pingdingshan University =

University in Pingdingshan, Henan, China

- 平顶山学院
- Former names: Pingdingshan Normal School; Pingdingshan Teachers Training College
- Type: Public university
- Established: October 1959
- Location: Pingdingshan, Henan, China; 33°44′48″N 113°12′35″E
- Website: www.pdsu.edu.cn/pdsu/en/en.html

Pingdingshan University (simplified Chinese: 平顶山学院; traditional Chinese: 平頂山學院; pinyin: Píngdǐngshān Xuéyuàn), founded in October 1959, is in Pingdingshan City, Henan Province, China.

== Founded ==
Pingdingshan University was founded in October 1959. In August 1977, junior college classes were attached to Pingdingshan Normal School, and in 1984 it was named Pingdingshan Teachers Training College.

== Academics ==
The university includes the School of Chinese Language; the School of Foreign Languages; Math and Information Science College; Economics and Management College; School of Chemistry Art; College of Information Science and Technology; Teachers' College; Political Science Department; Environment and Geography Department; Physical Education Department; and Music and Arts Department.

Besides these, the school offers a Department of English for General Teaching, Adult Education College, Politics Education Department and an Education Artificial Department.
