= Jia County, Henan =

Jia County 郏县
- County
- Location of the seat in Henan
- Coordinates: 33°58′19″N 113°12′47″E
- Country: People's Republic of China
- Province: Henan
- Prefecture-level city: Pingdingshan

Area
  - Total: 727 km^{2} (281 sq mi)

Population (2019)
  - Total: 577,600
  - Density: 794/km^{2} (2,060/sq mi)
- Time zone: UTC+8 (China Standard)
- Postal code: 467100

Jia County or Jiaxian (simplified Chinese: 郏县; traditional Chinese: 郟縣; pinyin: Jiá Xiàn) is a county under the administration of Pingdingshan City, in south-central Henan Province, China.

Jia county is famous for heluo noodles, the Three-Su Temple and Linfeng village.

Three-Su Temple is the place where the famous poets Su Xun, Su Shi and Su Zhe are buried.

Linfeng village's traditional red stone architecture has high historical and cultural value with distinctive local characteristics.

== Administrative divisions ==
As of 2012, this county is divided to 6 towns, 7 townships and 1 ethnic township.

Towns

- Chengguan (城关镇)
- Zhongjia (冢头镇)
- Anliang (安良镇)
- Tangjie (堂街镇)
- Xuedian (薛店镇)
- Changqiao (长桥镇)

Townships

- Wangji Township (王集乡)
- Likou Township (李口乡)
- Ciba Township (茨芭乡)
- Guangkuotiandi Township (广阔天地乡)
- Huangdao Township (黄道乡)
- Baimiao Township (白庙乡)
- Zhayuan Township (渣园乡)

Ethnic townships

- Yaozhuang Hui Township (姚庄回族乡)

== Climate ==
Climate data for Jiaxian, elevation 184 m (604 ft), (1991–2020 normals, extremes 1981–2010)
Month	Jan	Feb	Mar	Apr	May	Jun	Jul	Aug	Sep	Oct	Nov	Dec	Year
Record high °C (°F)	19.7 (67.5)	24.4 (75.9)	28.5 (83.3)	33.8 (92.8)	41.3 (106.3)	40.7 (105.3)	40.0 (104.0)	37.7 (99.9)	40.0 (104.0)	34.4 (93.9)	27.6 (81.7)	22.0 (71.6)	41.3 (106.3)
Mean daily maximum °C (°F)	6.7 (44.1)	10.2 (50.4)	15.6 (60.1)	22.1 (71.8)	27.5 (81.5)	32.2 (90.0)	32.1 (89.8)	30.7 (87.3)	27.1 (80.8)	22.1 (71.8)	14.9 (58.8)	8.8 (47.8)	20.8 (69.5)
Daily mean °C (°F)	1.2 (34.2)	4.3 (39.7)	9.5 (49.1)	15.8 (60.4)	21.3 (70.3)	26.1 (79.0)	27.3 (81.1)	25.8 (78.4)	21.3 (70.3)	15.9 (60.6)	9.0 (48.2)	3.2 (37.8)	15.1 (59.1)
Mean daily minimum °C (°F)	−3.0 (26.6)	−0.4 (31.3)	4.3 (39.7)	9.9 (49.8)	15.5 (59.9)	20.6 (69.1)	23.2 (73.8)	22.0 (71.6)	17.0 (62.6)	11.3 (52.3)	4.5 (40.1)	−0.9 (30.4)	10.3 (50.6)
Record low °C (°F)	−16.8 (1.8)	−16.7 (1.9)	−9.3 (15.3)	−2.1 (28.2)	3.4 (38.1)	11.2 (52.2)	15.4 (59.7)	11.3 (52.3)	7.8 (46.0)	0.2 (32.4)	−7.3 (18.9)	−12.6 (9.3)	−16.8 (1.8)
Average precipitation mm (inches)	11.8 (0.46)	13.7 (0.54)	24.1 (0.95)	38.2 (1.50)	61.8 (2.43)	84.5 (3.33)	149.7 (5.89)	108.3 (4.26)	80.9 (3.19)	41.3 (1.63)	30.7 (1.21)	9.8 (0.39)	654.8 (25.78)
Average precipitation days (≥ 0.1 mm)	3.9	4.7	6.0	6.6	7.8	8.2	10.9	10.8	9.2	7.0	6.2	3.7	85
Average snowy days	4.0	3.0	1.2	0.1	0	0	0	0	0	0	0.9	2.4	11.6
Average relative humidity (%)	61	62	64	67	65	65	79	82	77	70	67	61	68
Mean monthly sunshine hours	130.7	139.1	177.4	205.7	218.2	205.5	196.8	190.4	164.3	162.6	147.6	143.7	2,082
Percentage possible sunshine	41	45	48	52	51	48	45	46	45	47	48	47	47
Source: China Meteorological Administration
