= Mount Yao (Lushan County) =

Mountain in China

- Location within Northern China

Highest point
- Elevation: 2,153.1 m (7,064 ft)
- Coordinates: 33°42′49″N 112°13′41″E

Geography
- Location: Lushan County, Henan, China

Mount Yao (Chinese: 尧山; pinyin: Yáo Shān), formerly Mount Shiren (Chinese: 石人山), is located in west of Pingdingshan, Henan Province. It lies east of the Funiu Mountains. It stands in the middle area of inner land, near to the National Way 311, 207, close to the Zhijiao Railway. The Spring Temple Buddha is in this mountain.

In ancient times, this mount was named "Mount Rao" and recognized as the source place of "Liu", the family name that has large population in China. Mozi, the famous thinker in China, used live in this mountain; now his home is still remaining there. The mountain had been renamed Shiren since the 1950s and was changed back to the original name Yao in 2008.
