= Lushan County, Henan =

Lushan County 鲁山县
- County
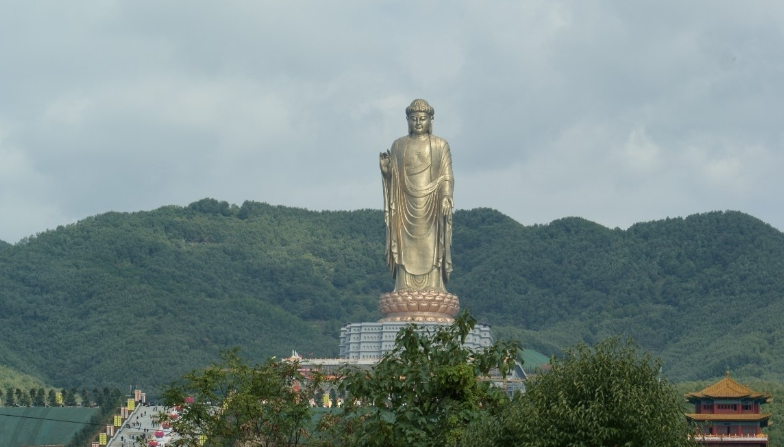

- Location of the seat in Henan
- Coordinates: 33°44′20″N 112°54′29″E
- Country: People's Republic of China
- Province: Henan
- Prefecture-level city: Pingdingshan

Area
  - Total: 2,406 km^{2} (929 sq mi)

Population (2019)
  - Total: 779,800
  - Density: 324.1/km^{2} (839.4/sq mi)
- Time zone: UTC+8 (China Standard)
- Postal code: 467300

Lushan County (simplified Chinese: 鲁山县; traditional Chinese: 魯山縣; pinyin: Lǔshān Xiàn) is a county in Pingdingshan, in southwest-central Henan Province, China, with a population of 830,000. This county is known for housing the Spring Temple Buddha, a giant statue of Buddha.

As of 2012, this county is divided to 4 subdistricts, 5 towns and 15 townships.

Subdistricts

- Lufeng Subdistrict (露峰街道)
- Qintai Subdistrict (琴台街道)
- Luyang Subdistrict (鲁阳街道)
- Huiyuan Subdistrict (汇源街道)

Towns

- Xiatang (下汤镇)
- Liangwa (梁洼镇)
- Zhangguanying (张官营镇)
- Zhangliang (张良镇)
- Yaoshan (尧山镇)

Townships

- Zhaocun Township (赵村乡)
- Sikeshu Township (四棵树乡)
- Tuancheng Township (团城乡)
- Xiongbei Township (熊背乡)
- Nanghe Township (瀼河乡)
- Wawu Township (瓦屋乡)
- Guanyinsi Township (观音寺乡)
- Zhaopingtaikuqu Township (昭平台库区乡)
- Beizi Township (背孜乡)
- Cangtou Township (仓头乡)
- Dongzhou Township (董周乡)
- Zhangdian Township (张店乡)
- Xinji Township (辛集乡)
- Gunziying Township (磙子营乡)
- Malou Township (马楼乡)

== Climate ==
Climate data for Lushan, elevation 146 m (479 ft), (1991–2020 normals, extremes 1981–present)
Month	Jan	Feb	Mar	Apr	May	Jun	Jul	Aug	Sep	Oct	Nov	Dec	Year
Record high °C (°F)	20.3 (68.5)	25.0 (77.0)	33.2 (91.8)	35.1 (95.2)	40.7 (105.3)	41.0 (105.8)	40.2 (104.4)	38.5 (101.3)	39.9 (103.8)	34.9 (94.8)	28.6 (83.5)	21.5 (70.7)	41.0 (105.8)
Mean daily maximum °C (°F)	7.0 (44.6)	10.5 (50.9)	15.9 (60.6)	22.5 (72.5)	27.8 (82.0)	31.8 (89.2)	31.9 (89.4)	30.6 (87.1)	26.9 (80.4)	22.1 (71.8)	15.2 (59.4)	9.2 (48.6)	21.0 (69.7)
Daily mean °C (°F)	1.1 (34.0)	4.2 (39.6)	9.6 (49.3)	16.0 (60.8)	21.4 (70.5)	25.9 (78.6)	27.2 (81.0)	25.7 (78.3)	21.2 (70.2)	15.6 (60.1)	8.9 (48.0)	3.0 (37.4)	15.0 (59.0)
Mean daily minimum °C (°F)	−3.7 (25.3)	−1.0 (30.2)	3.9 (39.0)	9.6 (49.3)	15.2 (59.4)	20.2 (68.4)	23.2 (73.8)	21.8 (71.2)	16.7 (62.1)	10.6 (51.1)	3.8 (38.8)	−1.8 (28.8)	9.9 (49.8)
Record low °C (°F)	−15.8 (3.6)	−16.7 (1.9)	−9.1 (15.6)	−2.3 (27.9)	2.2 (36.0)	11.4 (52.5)	15.7 (60.3)	12.4 (54.3)	6.9 (44.4)	−2.6 (27.3)	−8.0 (17.6)	−13.4 (7.9)	−16.7 (1.9)
Average precipitation mm (inches)	13.2 (0.52)	16.5 (0.65)	30.5 (1.20)	44.6 (1.76)	72.1 (2.84)	104.0 (4.09)	201.5 (7.93)	129.0 (5.08)	100.8 (3.97)	49.7 (1.96)	34.1 (1.34)	11.1 (0.44)	807.1 (31.78)
Average precipitation days (≥ 0.1 mm)	4.5	5.2	6.7	7.0	8.3	8.5	12.2	11.2	10.0	7.9	6.5	4.4	92.4
Average snowy days	4.1	3.1	1.3	0.1	0	0	0	0	0	0	1.0	2.7	12.3
Average relative humidity (%)	63	64	64	66	65	66	79	82	79	72	69	64	69
Mean monthly sunshine hours	114.4	121.7	156.1	182.8	191.2	179.0	161.5	153.5	141.2	138.1	129.1	131.0	1,799.6
Percentage possible sunshine	36	39	42	47	44	42	37	37	38	40	42	43	41
Source: China Meteorological Administration
