= Weidong, Pingdingshan =

Coordinates: 33°44′10″N 113°20′20″E

Weidong 卫东区
- District
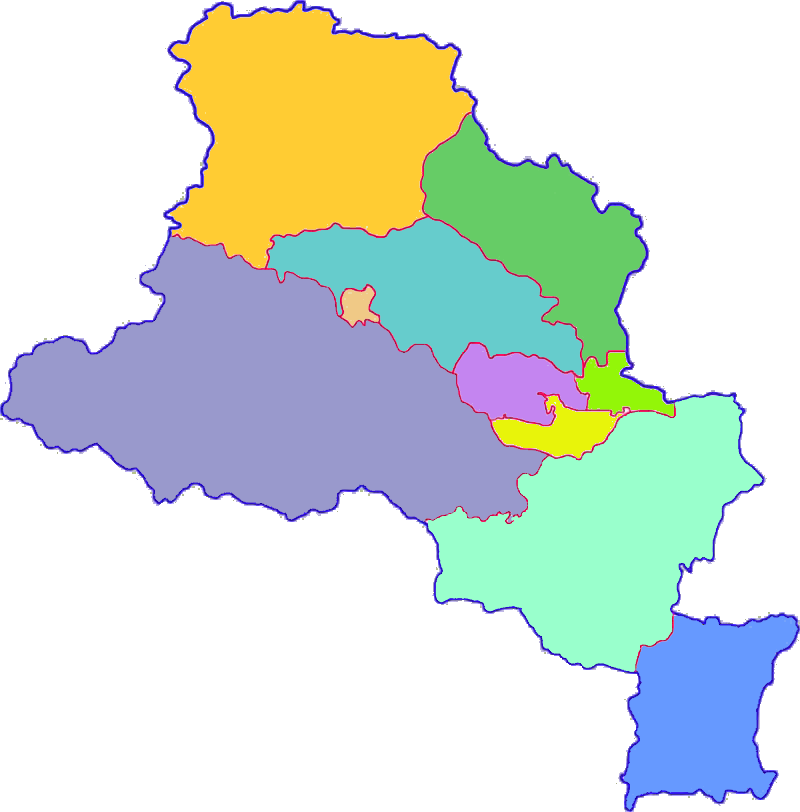
- Weidong in Pingdingshan

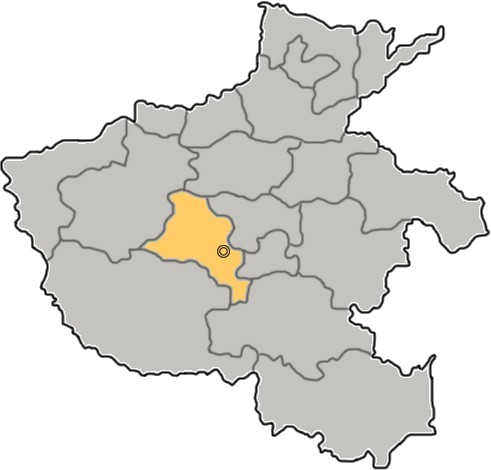
- Pingdingshan in Henan
- Country: People's Republic of China
- Province: Henan
- Prefecture-level city: Pingdingshan

Area
  - Total: 103 km^{2} (40 sq mi)

Population (2019)
  - Total: 321,700
  - Density: 3,120/km^{2} (8,090/sq mi)
- Time zone: UTC+8 (China Standard)
- Postal code: 467021

Weidong District (simplified Chinese: 卫东区; traditional Chinese: 衛東區; pinyin: Wèidōng Qū) is a district of the city of Pingdingshan, Henan province, China.

== Administrative divisions ==
As of 2012, this district is divided to 12 subdistricts.

Subdistricts

- Dong'anlu Subdistrict (东安路街道)
- Youyuelu Subdistrict (优越路街道)
- Wuyilu Subdistrict (五一路街道)
- Jianshelu Subdistrict (建设路街道)
- Donghuanlu Subdistrict (东环路街道)
- Donggongrenzhen Subdistrict (东工人镇街道)
- Guanghualu Subdistrict (光华路街道)
- Hongying Subdistrict (鸿鹰街道)
- Huangtai Subdistrict (皇台街道)
- Beihuanlu Subdistrict (北环路街道)
- Donggaohuang Subdistrict (东高皇街道)
- Pucheng Subdistrict (蒲城街道)
