= Changchun (disambiguation) =

Changchun is a city in Jilin, China.

Changchun or Chang Chun may also refer to:

- Changchun, Hunan, a town of Ziyang District, Yiyang City, Hunan, China
- Chinese ship Changchun, multiple ships
- Changchun Temple, Buddhist temple in Beijing, China
- 7485 Changchun, main-belt asteroid

== People with the name ==
- Master Changchun, or Qiu Chuji (1148–1227), Chinese Taoist
- Chang Ch'ün (1889–1990), Chinese politician
- Li Changchun (born 1944), Chinese politician

== See also ==
- Zhang Jun (disambiguation)
- Eternal Spring (film)
