= List of universities and colleges in Jilin =

The following is List of Universities and Colleges in Jilin.

Name	Chinese name	Type	Location	Note
Jilin University	吉林大学	National (Direct)	Changchun	Project 985 Double First-Class Construction
Yanbian University	延边大学	Provincial	Yanbian	Project 211 Double First-Class Construction
Changchun University of Science and Technology	长春理工大学	Provincial	Changchun	
Jilin Jianzhu University (JLJU)	吉林建筑大学	Provincial	Jilin	
Northeast Electric Power University	东北电力大学	Provincial	Jilin	
Changchun University of Technology	长春工业大学	Provincial	Changchun	
Jilin Jianzhu University	吉林建筑大学	Provincial	Jilin	
Jilin Institute of Chemical Technology	吉林化工学院	Provincial	Jilin	
Jilin Agricultural University	吉林农业大学	Provincial	Changchun	
Changchun University of Chinese Medicine	长春中医药大学	Provincial	Changchun	
Northeast Normal University	东北师范大学	National (Direct)	Changchun	Project 211 Double First-Class Construction
Beihua University	北华大学	Provincial	Jilin	
Tonghua Normal University	通化师范学院	Provincial	Tonghua	
Jilin Normal University	吉林师范大学	Provincial	Siping	
Changchun Normal University	长春师范大学	Provincial	Changchun	
Baicheng Normal University	白城师范学院	Provincial	Baicheng	
Jilin Sport University	吉林体育学院	Provincial	Changchun	
Jilin University of Arts	吉林艺术学院	Provincial	Changchun	
Jilin University of Foreign Languages	吉林外国语大学	Private	Changchun	
Jilin Business and Technology College	吉林工商学院	Provincial	Changchun	
Changchun Institute of Technology	长春工程学院	Provincial	Changchun	
Changchun University	长春大学	Provincial	Changchun	
Changchun Guanghua University	长春光华学院	Private	Changchun	
Bohua College, Jilin Normal University	吉林师范大学博华学院	Private	Siping	
Jinlin Medical University	吉林医药学院	Provincial	Jilin	
