= Changchun East railway station =

Railway station in Changchun, Jilin, China

Coordinates: 43.8956°N 125.3677°E

Changchun East 长春东
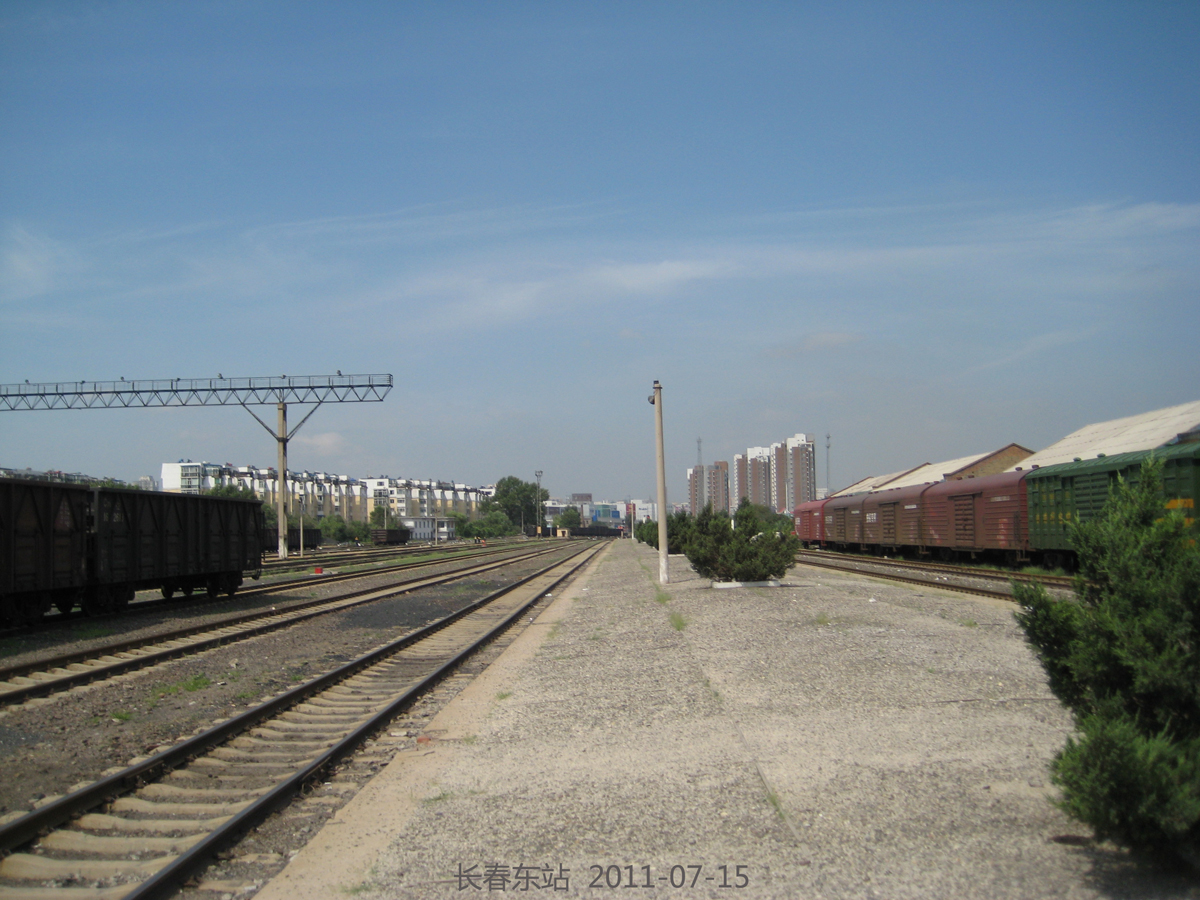

General information
- Other names: Changchundong
- Location: Changchun, Jilin; China
- Operated by: China Railway Corporation
- Line: Changchun–Tumen

Other information
- Station code: TMIS code: 62981; Telegraph code: COT; Pinyin code: CCD
- Classification: Class 2 station

Changchun East railway station is a railway station of Changchun–Tumen Railway. The station located in the Erdao District of Changchun, Jilin province, China.
