= Changchun University of Chinese Medicine =

University in Changchun, China

Changchun University of Chinese Medicine (Chinese: 长春中医药大学)
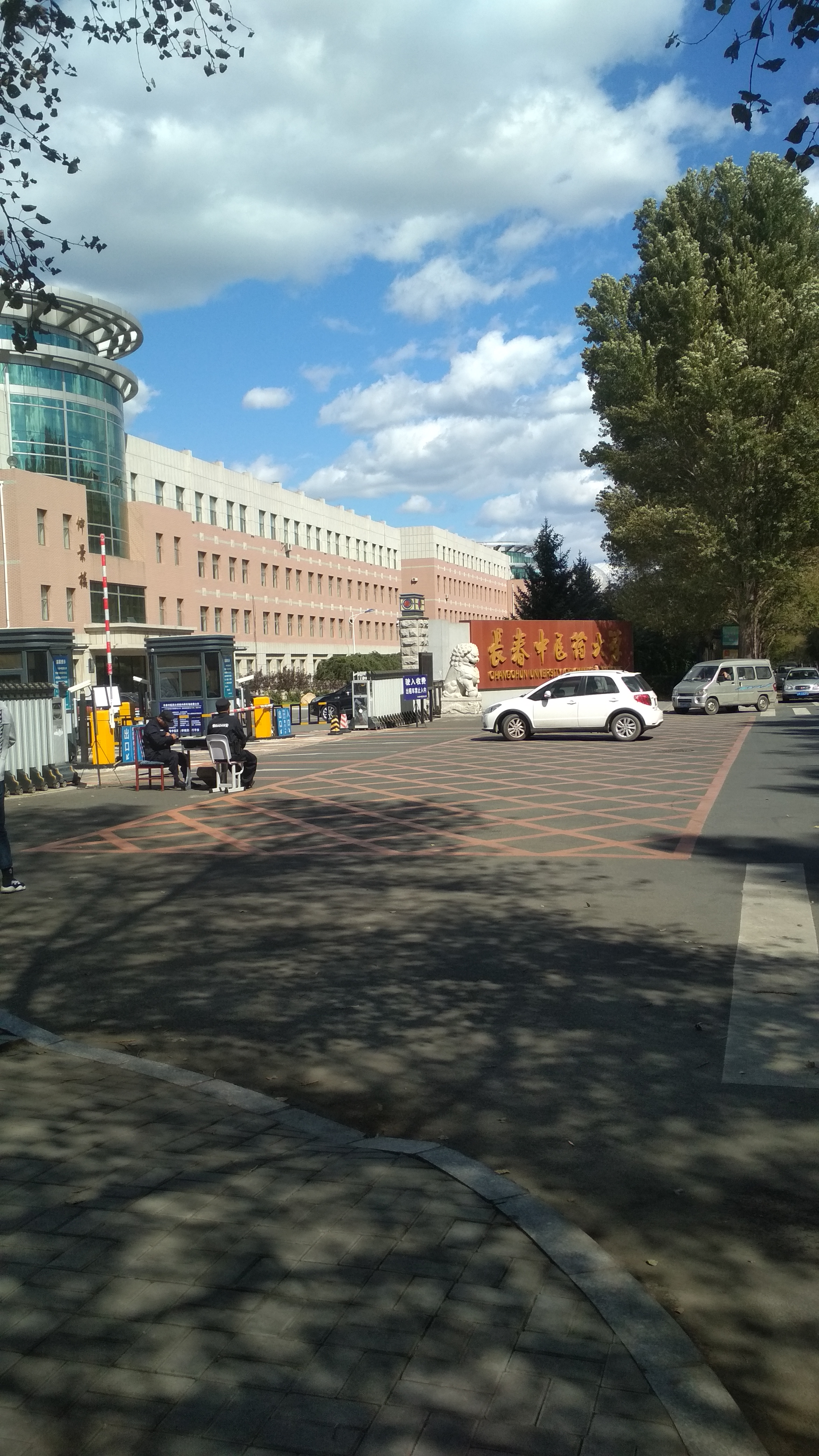
- The main gate of Changchun University of Chinese Medicine
- Motto: Learning from the past and embracing the present, cultivating virtue and refining skills
- Type: Public
- Established: 1958
- President: Leng Xiangyang
- Doctoral students: 402（2023）
- Location: No. 1035, Boshuo Road, Jingyue National High-tech Industrial Development Zone, Changchun City, Jilin Province, People's Republic of China
- Website: www.ccucm.edu.cn

The Changchun University of Chinese Medicine is a key university jointly built by the People's Government of Jilin Province and the National Administration of Traditional Chinese Medicine. It is located in Changchun, capital city of Jilin Province in northeast China.

== History ==
In 1950, the "Changchun Training School of Traditional Chinese Medicine" was established. It was the first Chinese medical school in Jinlin Province.

In 1958, the "Changchun College of Traditional Chinese Medicine" was established based on the training school.

In 1970, the college was merged into Jilin Medical University (the predecessor of Norman Bethune Health Science Center of Jilin University). In March 1978, Changchun College of Traditional Chinese Medicine was restored.

In 1992, the school started enrolling international students. It was one of the earliest institutions approved by the Ministry of Education to enroll international students.

In 2004, the college became a key educational institution of Jinling Province.

In 2006, it was renamed "Changchun University of Chinese Medicine", under the dual leadership of the Provincial Health Department and the Provincial Education Department.

In 2020, the university was listed in the Jilin Province Characteristic High-Level University Construction Project.

== Schools and departments ==
Programs at bachelor, master and doctoral levels are offered by the teaching units of:

- School of Basic Medical Sciences,
- School of Traditional Chinese Medicine,
- School of Pharmacy,
- School of Acupuncture and Moxibustion
- School of Nursing,
- School of Management,
- School of Clinical Medicine,
- School of Rehabilitation Medicine,
- School of Integrated Traditional and Western Medicine
- School of Marxism,
- Department of Physical Education,
- Innovation and Practice Center,
- School for Cultivating Young Marxists
- School of Innovation and Entrepreneurship,
- Department of Foreign Languages,
- School of Medical Information.

== Hospitals ==
The university has the following affiliated hospitals.

- Affiliated Hospital of Changchun University of Chinese Medicine
- Third Affiliated Clinical Hospital
- Fourth Affiliated Clinical Hospital (Changchun People's Hospital)

== Other information ==
The campus covers a land area of 395,000 square meters, with over 30,000 students.

The university has built international cooperations with teaching and research institutions of over 20 countries.

The university ranks 15 in the 2026 ShanghaiRanking of traditional Chinese medical universities in China.

Address: 1035 Boshuo Rd, Changchun Jingyue High-tech Industrial Development Zone, Changchun, Jilin Province, China.

== Related events ==
On the case of Changchun University of Traditional Chinese Medicine on July 29, 2018, Weibo user "Adorable Insect Er Er" accused Gao Lei, a physical education teacher at Changchun University of Traditional Chinese Medicine, of sexually harassing multiple female students by taking advantage of his position. The school later announced that it would launch an investigation into the matter.

== See also ==
- List of universities and colleges in Jilin
