= Changchun Confucius Temple =

- 长春文庙
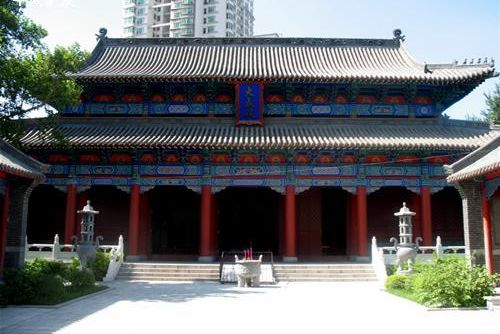
- The Hall of Dacheng at Changchun Confucius Temple.

- Location within Jilin

Religion
- Affiliation: Confucianism

Location
- Location: Nanguan District, Changchun, Jilin
- Country: China
- Interactive map of Changchun Confucius Temple
- Coordinates: 43°53′04″N 125°20′41″E

Architecture
- Style: Chinese architecture
- Founder: Zhu Chen
- Established: 1872
- Completed: 1872

Changchun Confucius Temple (simplified Chinese: 长春文庙; traditional Chinese: 長春文廟; pinyin: Chángchūn Wénmiào) is a Confucian temple located in Nanguan District of Changchun, Jilin.

== History ==
Changchun Confucius Temple was originally built in 1872 with the donation of a gentleman named Zhu Chen (Chinese: 朱琛). In 1894, in the 20th year of Guangxu period of the Qing dynasty (1644–1911), Yang Tonggui (Chinese: 杨同桂), the magistrate of Changchun, built the Wenchang Pavilion.

In 1924, Zhao Pengdi (Chinese: 赵鹏第), magistrate of Changchun, raised funds to restore and redecorate the temple.

After establishment of the Communist State, it was used as a primary school's schoolhouse. Part of the temple was demolished. In 1985 it was authorized as municipal level cultural relic preservation organ by the Changchun Municipal Government. And two years later it was classified as a provincial level cultural heritage by the Jilin Provincial Government. The Wenchang Pavilion was reconstruction in 2008.

== Architecture ==
The extant structure is based on the Qing dynasty building principles and retains the traditional architectural style. Now the existing main buildings include the Zhaobi (Chinese: 照壁), Panchi (Chinese: 泮池), Panqiao (Chinese: 泮桥), Bell tower, Drum tower, Hall of Kuixing (Chinese: 魁星楼), Gate of Lingxing (Chinese: 棂星门), Gate of Dacheng (Chinese: 大成门), Hall of Dacheng (Chinese: 大成殿), Hall of Chongsheng (Chinese: 崇圣殿), Wenchang Pavilion (Chinese: 文昌阁), and side halls.
