= Deutsche Internationale Schule Changchun =

German international school in China

Coordinates: 43.8047°N 125.3292°E

- Changchun, Jilin; China

Information
- Type: German international school
- Established: 2008
- Faculty: 15
- Grades: 1-10
- Enrollment: 70

Deutsche Internationale Schule Changchun
- Simplified Chinese: 长春市德国国际学校
- Traditional Chinese: 長春市德國國際學校
Transcriptions
Standard Mandarin
- Hanyu Pinyin: Chángchūnshì Déguó Guójì Xuéxiào

Deutsche Internationale Schule Changchun (长春市德国国际学校) is a German international school in Changchun, Jilin, China. It serves years 1–10.

As of 2016 it has 11 full-time employees and four part-time teachers for 70 students. It was officially recognized as a German school in 2008.
