= Changchun Normal University =

University in Changchun, China

Changchun Normal University 长春师范大学
- Motto: 学无止境，行为师表
- Type: Public
- Established: 1906
- Rector: 刘春明
- Administrative staff: 1,400
- Students: 18,000
- Address: Changchun, Jilin, China
- Website: www.cncnc.edu.cn

Changchun Normal University (Chinese: 长春师范大学; pinyin: Chángchūn Shīfàn Dàxué; originally Changhun Teacher's College) is a university in Changchun, Jilin province, People's Republic of China.

The school currently has 61 undergraduate majors, covering the five disciplines of humanities, social sciences, science, engineering, and management.

== History ==
Since establishment in 1906 during the Qing Dynasty, the school has undergone numerous name changes.

- In 1906, the Qing government established the Changchun Normal Training Institute.
- In 1907, Changchun Normal Training Institute merged with Mongolian school to form Changchun Prefectural School.
- In 1914, based on the Changchun Prefectural School, Changchun County Normal School was established.
- In 1915, the two normal schools in Changchun and Nong'an merged to form Jichang Road Normal School.
- In 1920, the school was renamed Jilin Provincial Second Normal School.
- In 1941, the school was renamed Temporary Primary Teacher Training Institute.
- In 1945, with the end of World War II, the school was renamed Changchun Municipal Normal School.
- In 1950, the school was renamed Changchun Normal School.
- In 1958, Changchun Normal Specialized College was established based on Changchun Normal School.
- In 1963, it was renamed Changchun Normal School.
- In 1981, it was renamed Changchun Normal College.
- In 1986, the school's ownership was transferred to China Nonferrous Metals Industry Corporation.
- In 1998, the school was co-managed by the central and local governments.
- In 2013, it was renamed Changchun Normal University.

=== New campus ===
In March 2023, Changchun Normal University began construction of a new campus. The new campus is located east of Xueyuan Street, north of Binhai Road, west of Jiaer Street, and south of Xueyuan Road. The project is divided into two phases, with a total planned area of 1.2 million square meters and a total construction area of 307,300 square meters.
