= Zhang Jun =

Zhang Jun (Wade–Giles: Chang Chün) may refer to:

- Zhang Jun (ambassador), (born 1960), Permanent Representative of China to the United Nations from July 2019 to March 2024
- Zhang Jun (prince) (307–346), ruler of the Former Liang state in ancient China during the Sixteen Kingdoms period
- Zhang Jun (Tang chancellor) (died 904), chancellor of the Tang dynasty
- Zhang Jun (general) (1086–1154), general of the Song dynasty
- Zhang Jun (Song chancellor) (1097–1164), chancellor of the Song dynasty
- Zhang Jun (politician) (born 1956), president of the Supreme People's Court (chief justice) of the People's Republic of China
- Zhang Jun (economist) (born 1963), Chinese economist and Cheung Kong Professor of Economics at Fudan University
- Zhang Jun (serial killer) (1966–2001), Chinese robber and serial killer
- Zhang Jun (Kunqu) (born 1974), Chinese Kunqu opera singer and UNESCO Artist for Peace
- Qiu Chuji (Taoist name Master Changchun) (born 1148), Chinese Taoist monk

Sportspeople

- Zhang Jun (badminton) (born 1977), Chinese badminton player
- Zhang Jun (shot putter) (born 1983), Chinese shot putter
- Zhang Jun (footballer) (born 1992), Chinese footballer
- Zhang Jun (racewalker) (born 1998), Chinese racewalker
- Zhang Jun (judoka) (born 1987), Chinese judoka

== See also ==
- Zhang Qun
