= Changchun =

Capital city of Jilin Province, China

Changchun 长春市
- Prefecture-level & Sub-provincial city
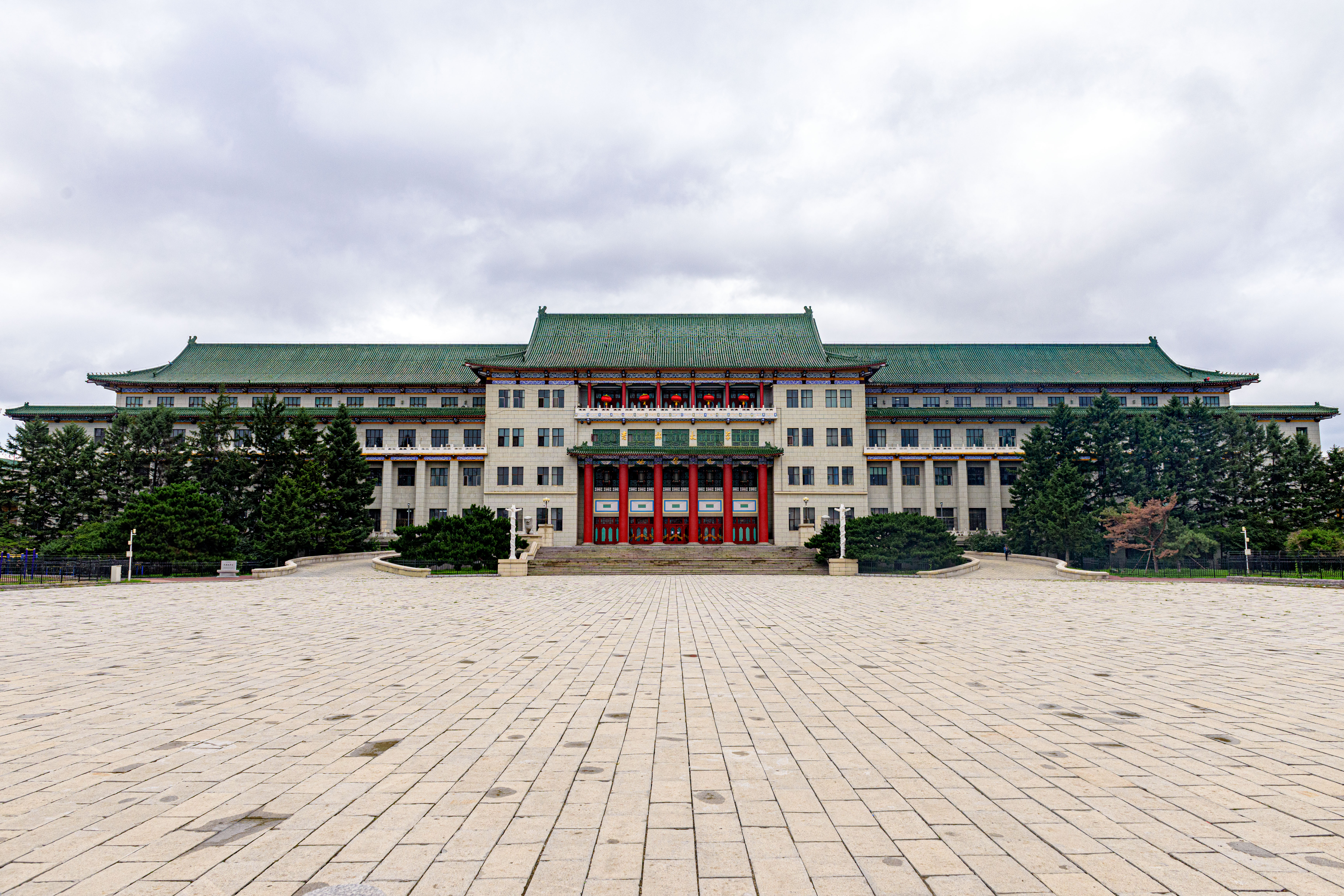
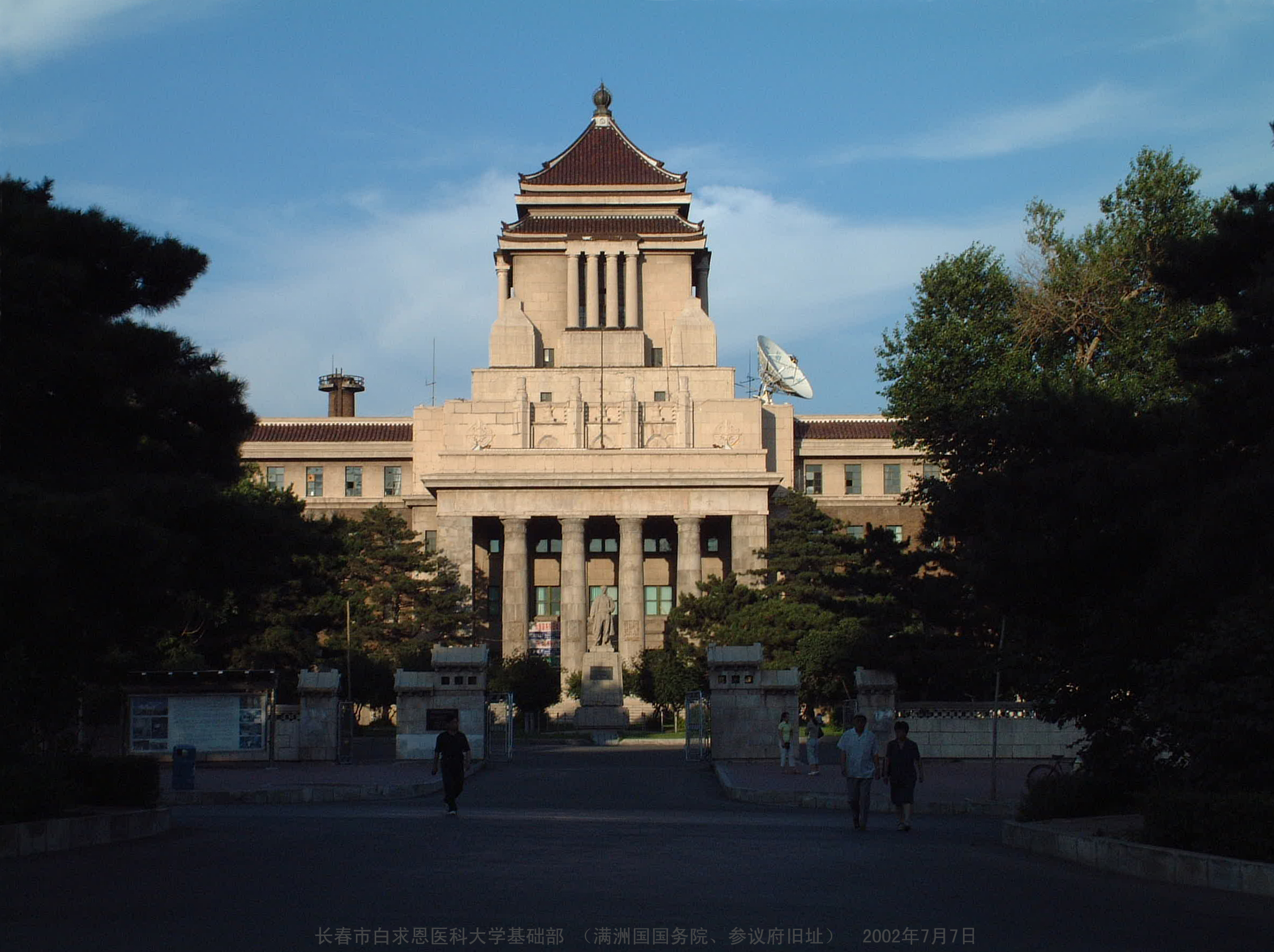
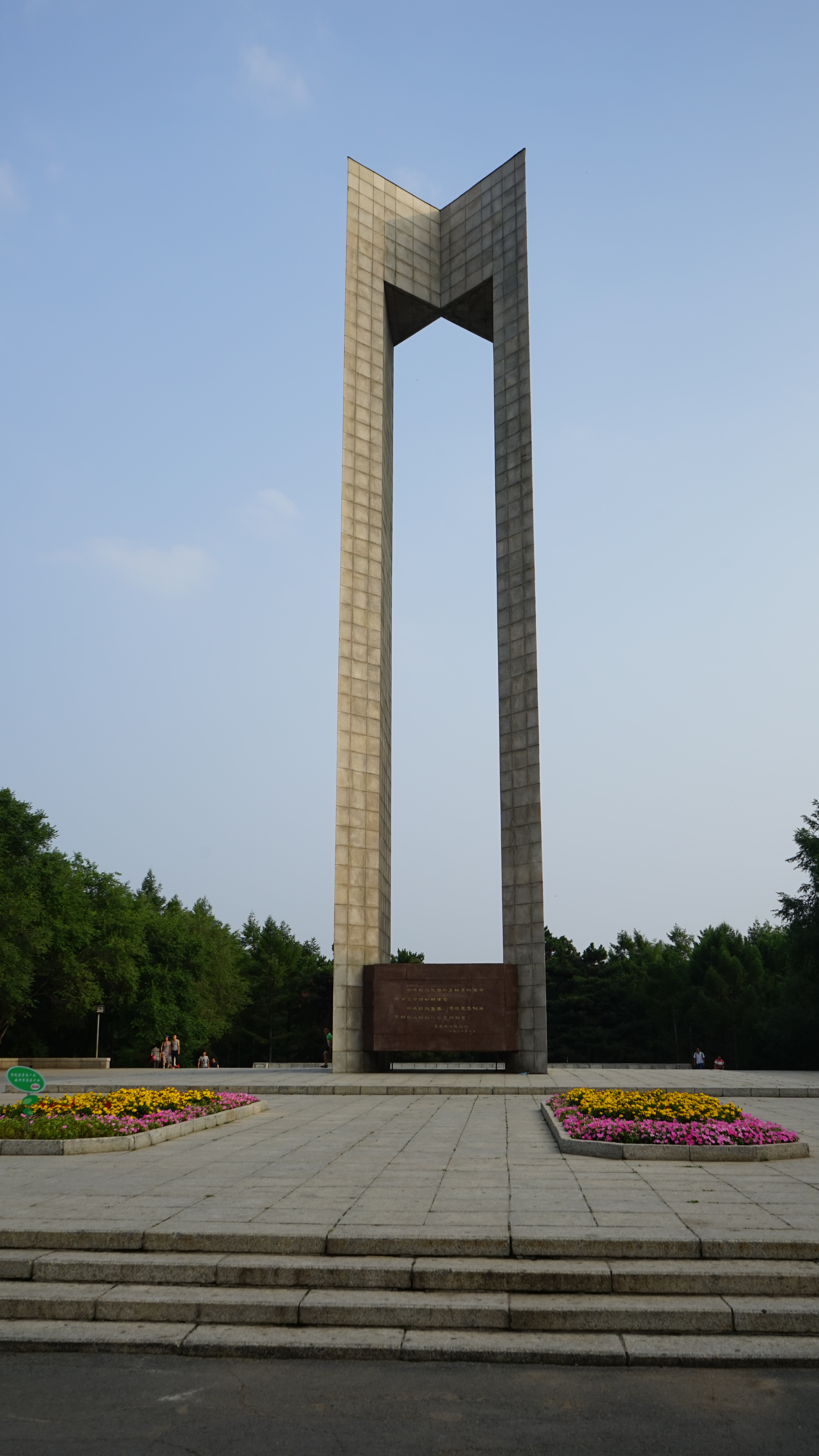
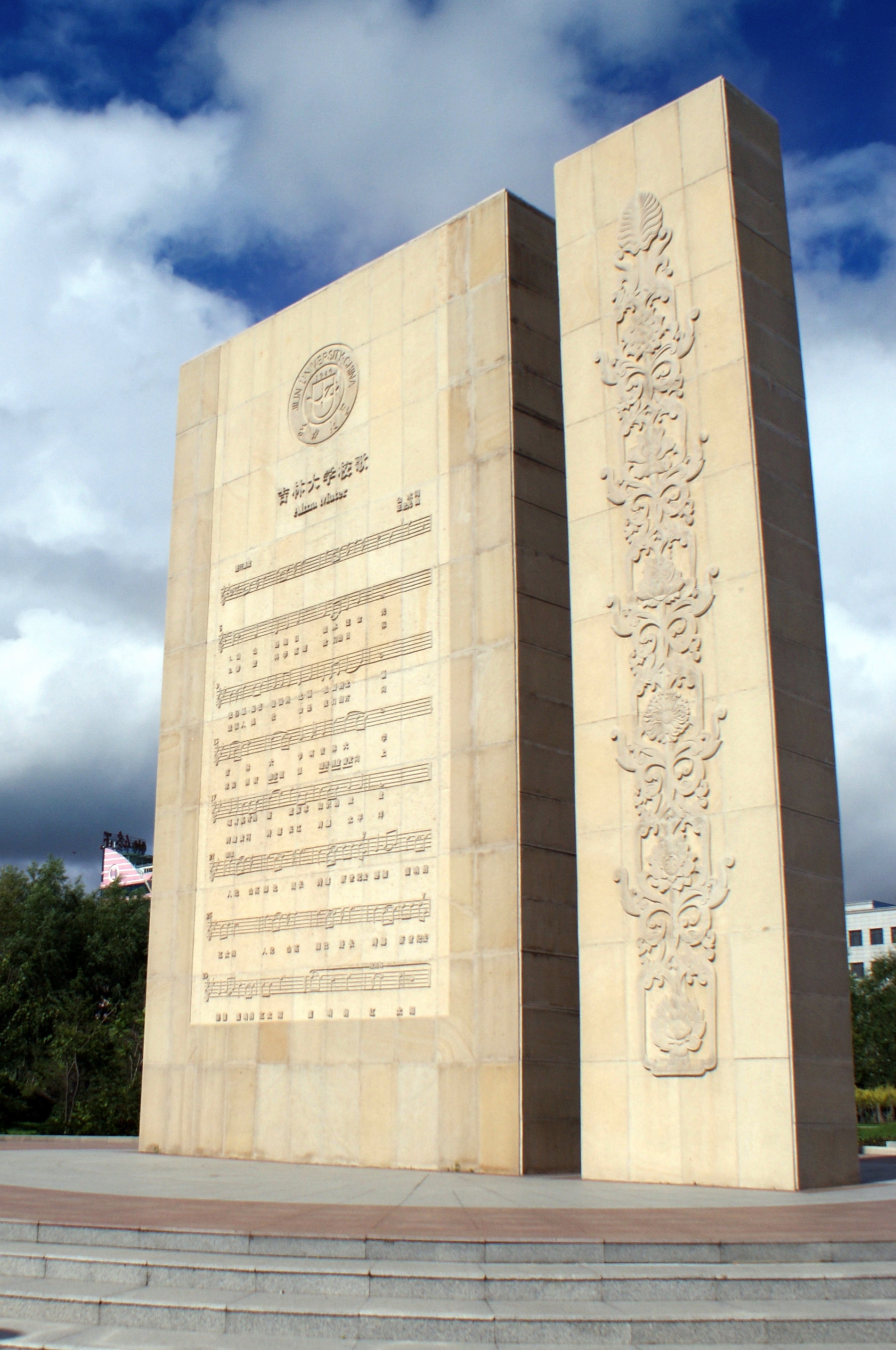
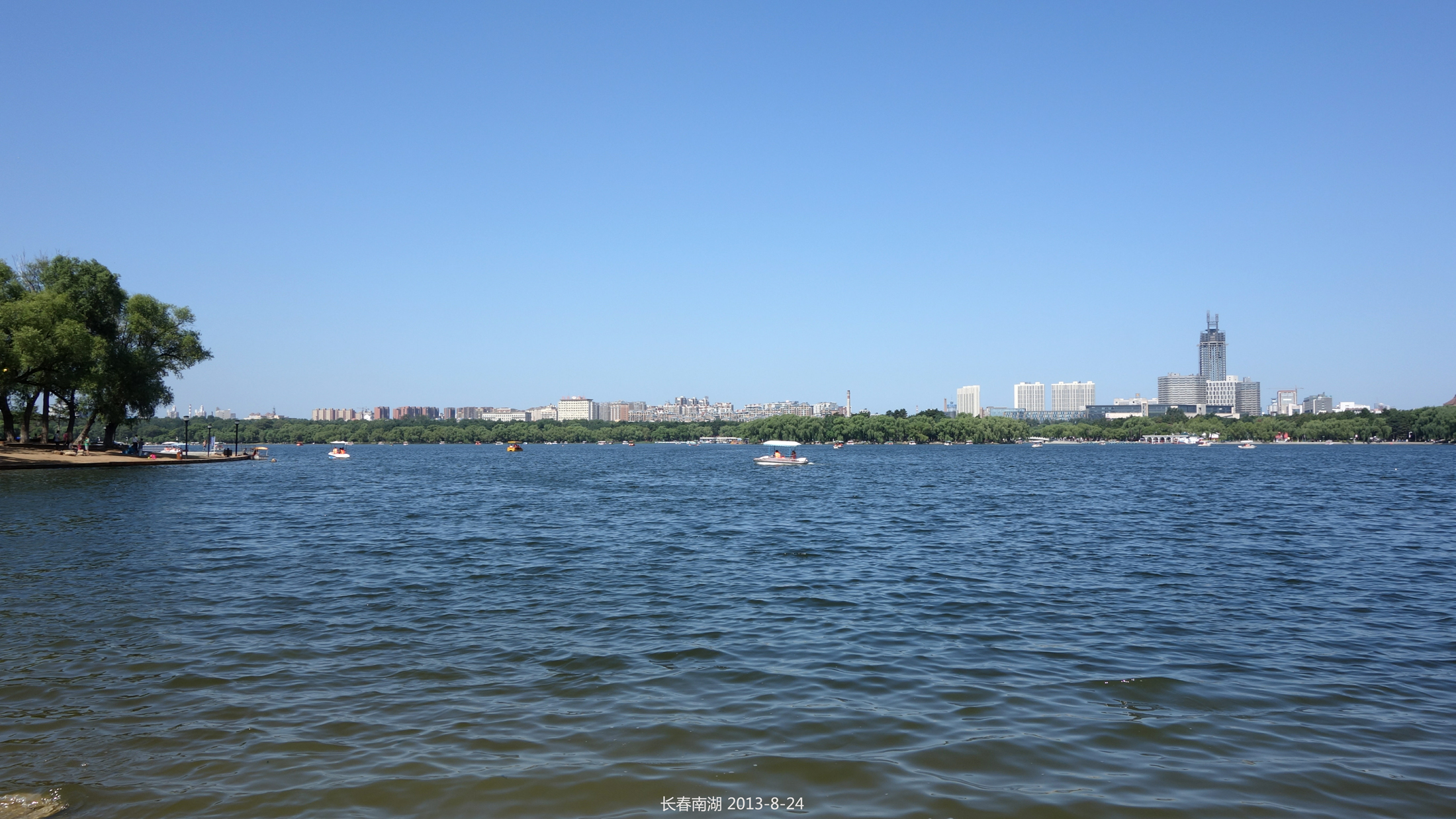
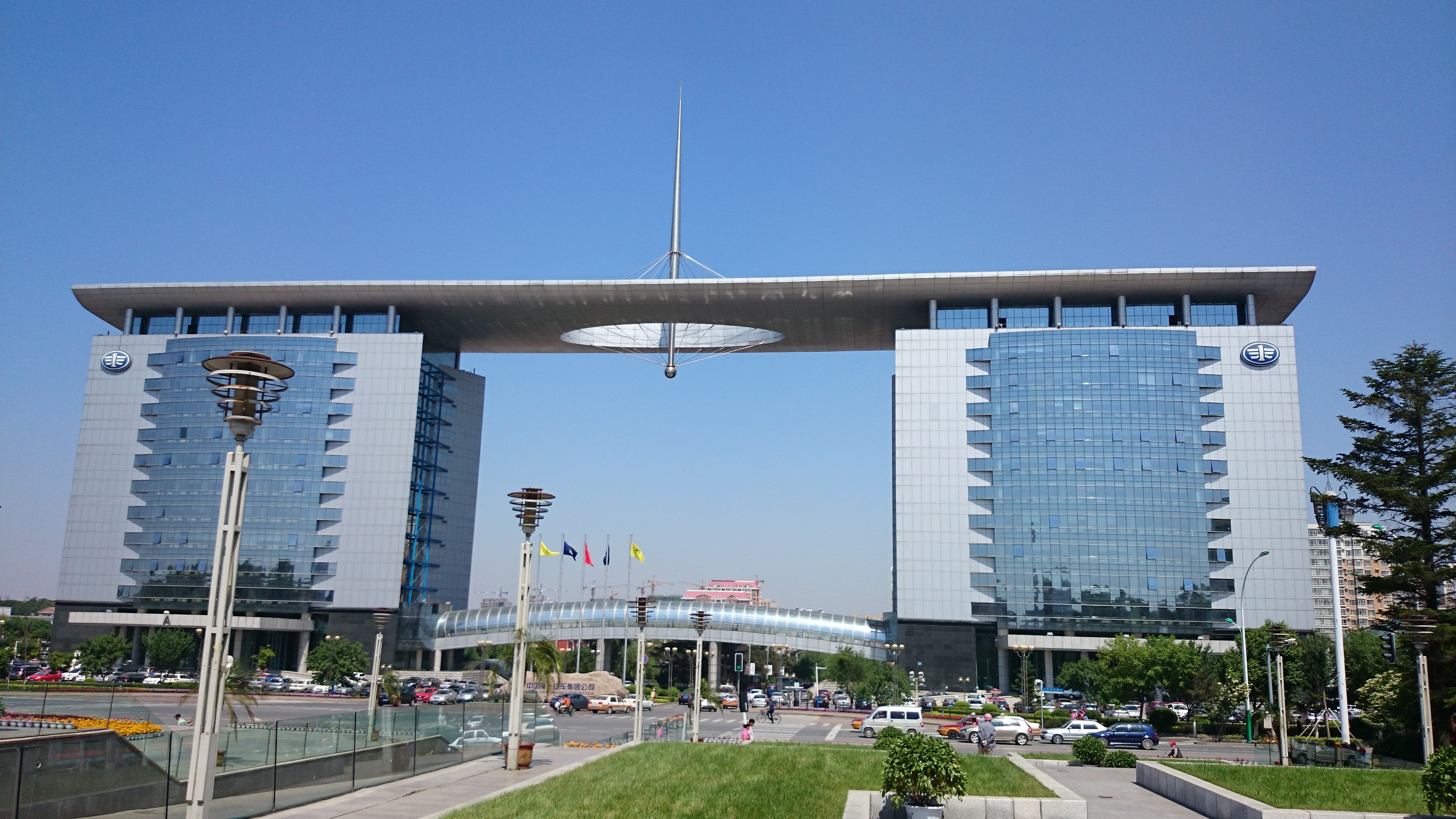
- Changchun Geological Palace Museum Former General Affairs State Council of Manchukuo Changchun Liberation Monument JLU South Lake of Changchun Headquarter of FAW Group Corporation
- Nickname: 北国春城 (Spring City of Northern China)
- Interactive map of Changchun
- Location of the city centre in Jilin Changchun (China)
- Coordinates (Jilin People's Government): 43°53′49″N 125°19′34″E
- Country: China
- Province: Jilin
- County-level divisions: 7 districts 2 county-level divisions 1 county
- Incorporated (town): 1889
- Incorporated (city): 1932
- Municipal seat: Nanguan District

Government
  - Type: Sub-provincial city
  - Body: Changchun Municipal People's Congress
  - CCP Secretary: Lian Maojun
  - Congress Chairman: Wang Zhihou
  - Mayor: Gu Gang
  - CPPCC Chairman: Gao Zhiguo

Area
  - City: 24,758 km^{2} (9,559 sq mi)
  - Urban (2017): 1,855.00 km^{2} (716.22 sq mi)
  - Metro: 1,855.00 km^{2} (716.22 sq mi)
- Elevation: 222 m (728 ft)

Population (2020 census)
  - City: 9,066,906
  - Density: 366.22/km^{2} (948.51/sq mi)
  - Urban: 5,691,024
  - Urban density: 3,067.94/km^{2} (7,945.92/sq mi)
  - Metro: 5,019,477
  - Metro density: 2,705.92/km^{2} (7,008.29/sq mi)

GDP
  - City: CN¥ 763 billion US$ 107.2 billion
  - Per capita: CN¥ 84,175; US$ 11,820
- Time zone: UTC+8 (China Standard)
- Postal code: 130000
- Area code: 0431
- ISO 3166 code: CN-JL-01
- License plate prefixes: 吉A
- Flower: Clivia miniata
- Website: www.changchun.gov.cn

Changchun
- "Changchun" in Simplified Chinese characters

Chinese name
- Simplified Chinese: 长春
- Traditional Chinese: 長春
- Hanyu Pinyin: Chángchūn
- Literal meaning: "Long Spring"
Transcriptions
Standard Mandarin
- Hanyu Pinyin: Chángchūn
- Bopomofo: ㄔㄤˊ ㄔㄨㄣ
- Gwoyeu Romatzyh: Charngchuen
- Wade–Giles: Chʻang^{2}-chʻun^{1}
- IPA: [ʈʂʰǎŋ.ʈʂʰwə́n]
Wu
- Suzhounese: Zan^{2}-tshen^{1}
Yue: Cantonese
- Yale Romanization: Chèuhng-chēun
- Jyutping: Coeng^{4}-ceon^{1}
- IPA: [tsʰœŋ˩.tsʰɵn˥]
Southern Min
- Hokkien POJ: Tiông-chhun

Hsinking
- Chinese: 新京
- Hanyu Pinyin: Xīnjīng
- Literal meaning: New Capital
Transcriptions
Standard Mandarin
- Hanyu Pinyin: Xīnjīng
- Bopomofo: ㄒㄧㄣ ㄐㄧㄥ
- Gwoyeu Romatzyh: Shinjing
- Wade–Giles: Hsin^{1}-ching^{1}
- Yale Romanization: Syīnjīng

Manchu name
- Manchu script: ᠴᠠᠨᡤᠴᠣᠨ
- Romanization: Cangcon

Changchun (Note: UK: /tʃæŋˈtʃʊn/, US: /tʃɑːŋ-/; Chinese: 长春; pinyin: Chángchūn) is the capital and largest city of Jilin Province, China, on the Songliao Plain. Changchun is administered as a sub-provincial city, comprising seven districts, one county and three county-level cities. At the 2020 census of China, Changchun had a population of 9,066,906. Changchun's metro area, comprising five districts and one development area, had a population of 5,019,477. Shuangyang and Jiutai districts are not urbanized yet. It is one of the biggest cities in Northeast China, along with Shenyang, Dalian and Harbin.

The name of the city means "long spring" in Chinese. Between 1932 and 1945, Changchun was renamed Xinjing (Chinese: 新京; pinyin: Xīnjīng; lit. 'new capital') or Hsinking by the Kwantung Army as the capital of the Imperial Japanese puppet state of Manchukuo, occupying modern Northeast China. After the foundation of the People's Republic of China in 1949, Changchun was established as the provincial capital of Jilin in 1954.

Known locally as China's "City of Automobiles", Changchun is an important industrial base with a particular focus on the automotive sector. Because of its key role in the domestic automobile industry, Changchun was sometimes referred to as the "Detroit of China". The FAW Group, one of the "Big Four" state-owned car manufacturers of China, is headquartered in the city. Apart from this industrial aspect, Changchun is also one of four "National Garden Cities" awarded by the Ministry of Construction of P.R. China in 2001 due to its high urban greening rate.

Changchun is also one of the top 30 cities in the world by scientific research as tracked by the Nature Index according to the Nature Index 2024 Science Cities. The city is home to several major universities, notably Jilin University and Northeast Normal University, members of China's prestigious universities in the Double First-Class Construction.

== History ==
=== Early history ===
Changchun was initially established on imperial decree as a small trading post and frontier village during the reign of the Jiaqing Emperor in the Qing dynasty. Trading activities mainly involved furs and other natural products during this period. In 1800, the Jiaqing Emperor selected a small village on the east bank of the Yitong River and named it "Changchun Ting".

At the end of the 18th century peasants from overpopulated provinces such as Shandong and Hebei began to settle in the region. In 1889, the village was promoted into a city known as "Changchun Fu".

=== Railway era ===
In May 1898, Changchun got its first railway station, located in Kuancheng, part of the railway from Harbin to Lüshun (the southern branch of the Chinese Eastern Railway), constructed by the Russian Empire.

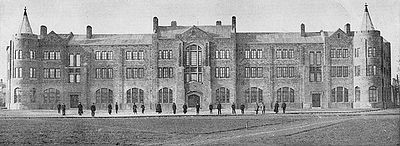
The South Manchuria Railway office of Changchun

After Russia's loss of the southernmost section of this branch as a result of the Russo-Japanese War of 1904–1905, the Kuancheng station (Kuanchengtze, in contemporary spelling) became the last Russian station on this branch. The next station just a short distance to the south—the new "Japanese" Changchun station—became the first station of the South Manchuria Railway (‘Mantie’), which then owned all the tracks running farther south, to Lüshun, which they re-gauged to the standard gauge (after a brief period of using the narrow Japanese 3 ft 6 in (1,067 mm) gauge during the war).

A special Russo-Japanese agreement of 1907 provided that Russian gauge tracks would continue from the "Russian" Kuancheng Station to the "Japanese" Changchun Station, and vice versa, tracks on the "gauge adapted by the South Manchuria Railway" (i.e. the standard gauge) would continue from Changchun Station to Kuancheng Station.

An epidemic of pneumonic plague occurred in surrounding Manchuria from 1910 to 1911, known as the Manchurian plague. It was the worst-ever recorded outbreak of pneumonic plague which was spread through the Trans-Manchurian railway from the border trade port of Manzhouli. This turned out to be the beginning of the large pneumonic plague pandemic of Manchuria and Mongolia which ultimately claimed 60,000 victims.

=== City planning and development: 1906 to 1931 ===
City planning map of Changchun, 1932

The Treaty of Portsmouth formally ended the Russo-Japanese War of 1904–05 and saw the transfer and assignment to the Empire of Japan in 1906 the railway between Changchun and Port Arthur, and all its branches.

Having realized the strategic importance of Changchun's location with respect to Japan, China and Russia, the Japanese Government sent a group of planners and engineers to Changchun to determine the best site for a new railway station.

Without the consent of the Chinese Government, Japan purchased or seized from local farmers the land on which the Changchun Railway Station was to be constructed as the centre of the South Manchuria Railway Affiliated Areas (SMRAA). In order to turn Changchun into the centre for extracting the agricultural and mineral resources of Manchuria, Japan developed a blueprint for Changchun and invested heavily in the construction of the city.

At the beginning of 1907, as the prelude to, and preparation for, the invasion and occupation of China, Japan initiated the planning programme of the SMRAA, which embodied distinctive colonial characteristics. The guiding ideology of the overall design was to build a high standard colonial city with sophisticated facilities, multiple functions and a large scale.

Accordingly, nearly ¥7 million on average was allocated on a year-by-year basis for urban planning and construction during the period 1907 to 1931.

The comprehensive plan was to ensure the comfort required by Japanese employees on Manchurian Railways, build up Changchun into a base for Japanese control of the whole Manchuria in order to provide an effective counterweight to Russia in this area of China.

The city's role as a rail hub was underlined in its planning and construction, the main design concepts of which read as follows: under conventional grid pattern terms, two geoplagiotropic boulevards were newly carved eastward and westward from the grand square of the new railway station. The two helped form two intersections with the gridded prototypes, which led to two circles of South and West. The two sub-civic centres served as axes on which eight radial roads were blazed that took the shape of a sectoral structure.

At that time, the radial circles and the design concept of urban roads were quite advanced and scientific. It activated to great extent the serious urban landscapes as well as clearly identifying the traditional gridded pattern.

With the new Changchun railway station as its centre, the urban plan divided the SMRAA into various specified areas: residential quarters 15%, commerce 33%, grain depot 19%, factories 12%, public entertainment 9%, and administrative organs (including a Japanese garrison) 12%. Each block provided the railway station with supporting and systematic services dependent on its own functions.

In the meantime, a comprehensive system of judiciary and military police was established which was totally independent of China. That accounted for the widespread nature of military facilities within the urban construction area of 3.967 km^{2} (1.532 sq mi), such as the railway garrison, the gendarmerie and the police department, with its 18 local police stations.

Perceiving Changchun as a tabula rasa upon which to construct new and sweeping conceptions of the built environment, the Japanese used the city as a practical laboratory to create two distinct and idealized urban milieus, each appropriate to a particular era. From 1906 to 1931, Changchun served as a key railway town through which the Japanese orchestrated an informal empire. Between 1932 and 1945, the city became home to a grandiose new Asian capital. Yet, while the façades in the city and later the capital contrasted markedly, along with the attitudes of the state they upheld, the shifting styles of planning and architecture consistently attempted to represent Japanese rule as progressive, beneficent, and modern.

Changchun expanded rapidly as the junction between of the Japanese-owned South Manchurian Railway and the Russian-owned Chinese Eastern Railway, remaining the break of gauge point between the Russian and standard gauges into the 1930s,

=== Manchukuo and World War II ===
Emblem of Hsinking in Manchukuo.

On 10 March 1932 the capital of Manchukuo, a Japan-controlled puppet state in Manchuria, was established in Changchun. The city was then renamed Hsinking (Chinese: 新京; pinyin: Xīnjīng; Wade–Giles: Hsin-ching; Japanese: Shinkyō; literally "New Capital") on 13 March. The Emperor Puyi resided in the Imperial Palace (Chinese: 帝宮; pinyin: Dì gōng) which is now the Museum of the Manchu State Imperial Palace. During the Manchukuo period, the region experienced harsh suppression, brutal warfare on the civilian population, forced conscription and labor and other Japanese sponsored government brutalities; at the same time a rapid industrialisation and militarisation took place. Hsinking was a well-planned city with broad avenues and modern public works. The city underwent rapid expansion in both its economy and infrastructure. Many of buildings built during the Japanese colonial era still stand today, including those of the Eight Major Bureaus of Manchukuo (Chinese: 八大部; pinyin: Bādà bù) as well as the Headquarters of the Japanese Kwantung Army.

Changchun's city construction under Manchukuo became an archetypal example of the Pan-Asianist style of architecture pushed by Japanese planners. This style of Modern architecture had a heavy usage of concrete topped with ornamental roofs of Chinese or Japanese origin along with other classical or Asian-inspired decorations, made to reflect the Pan-Asianist national narrative of the infant Manchukuo state.

==== Construction of Hsinking ====
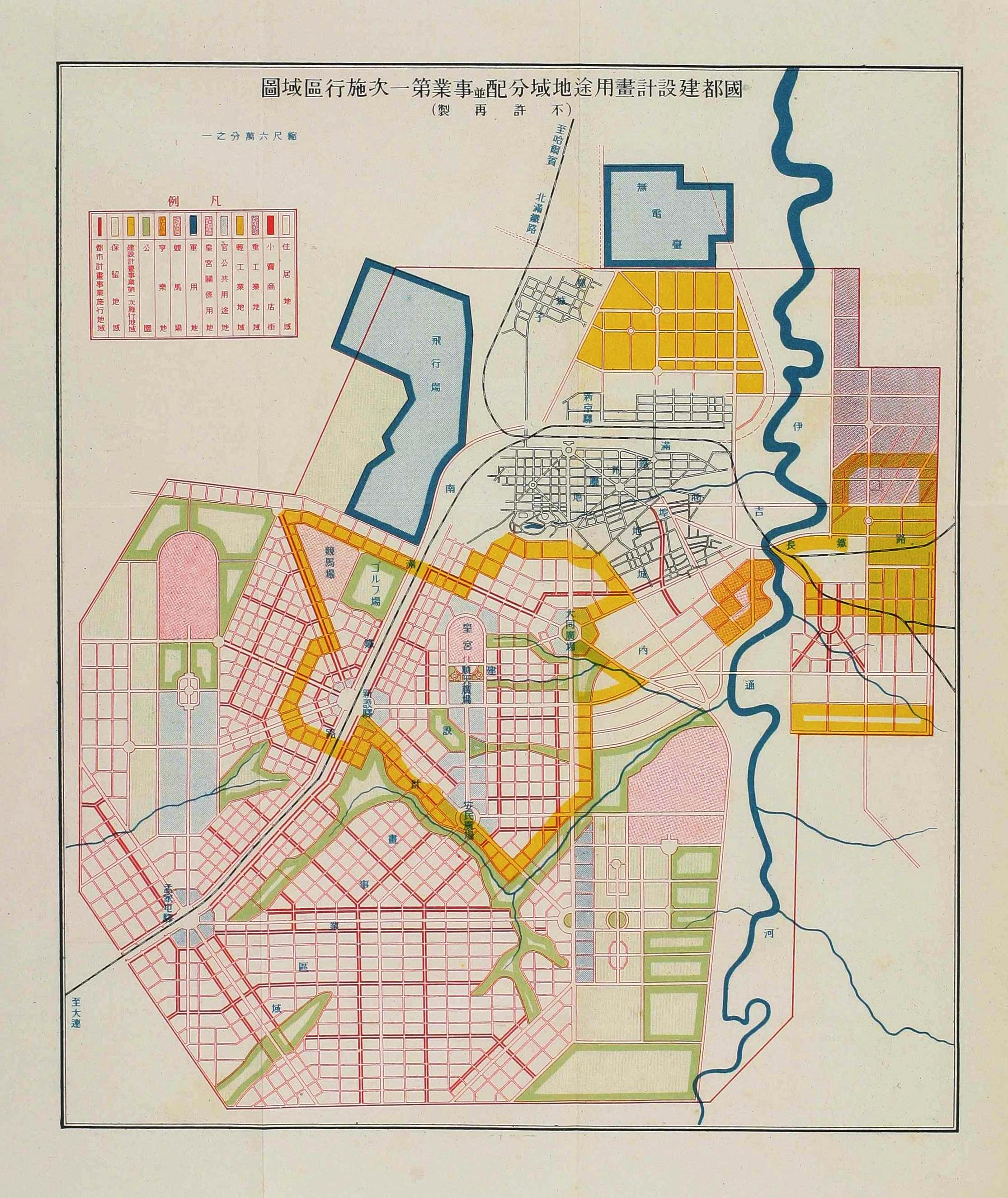
Hsinking Master Plan Map (1934)

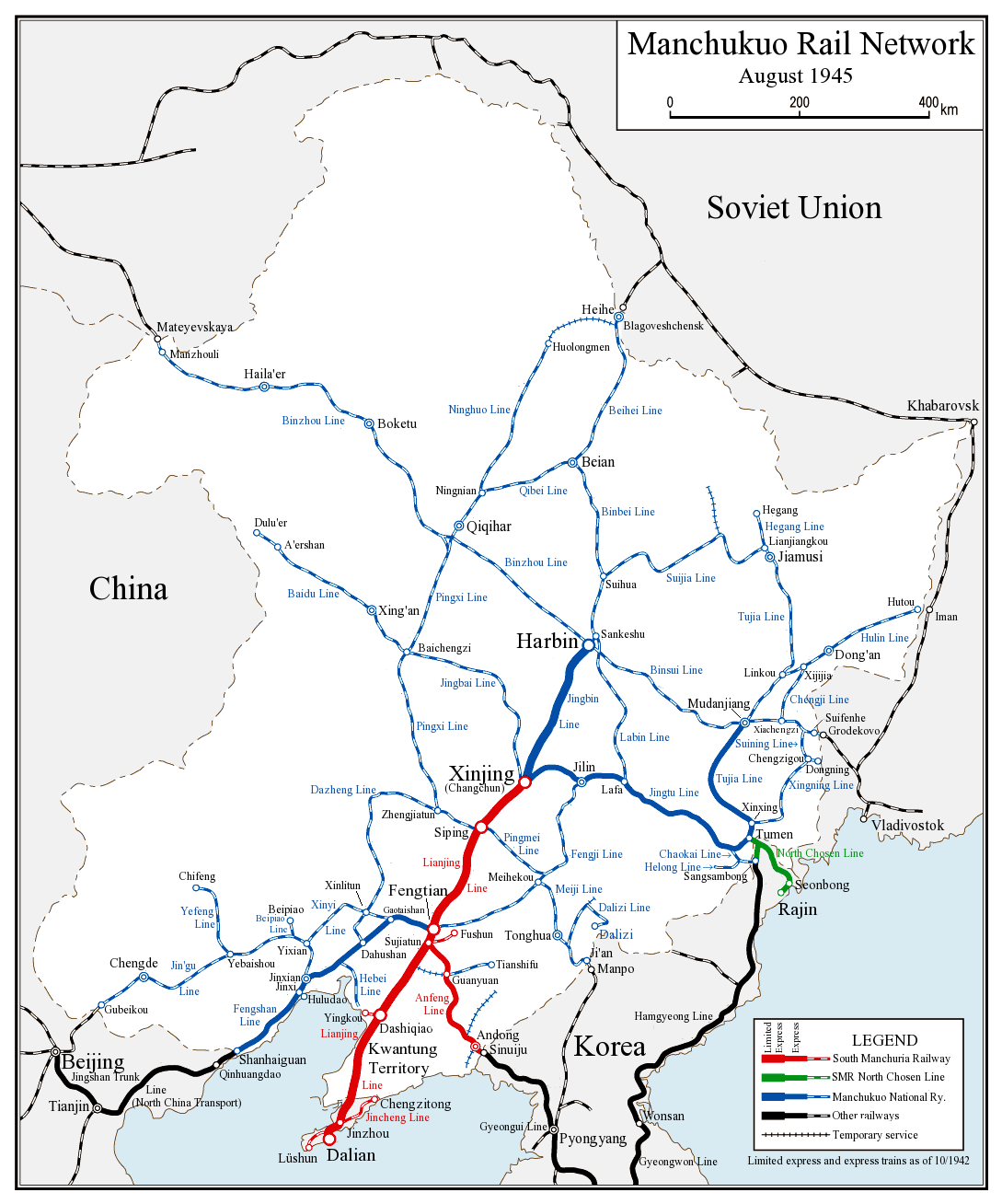
Rail network of Manchukuo in 1945, which labeled Changchun as Xinjing

Hsinking was the only Direct-controlled municipality (特别市) in Manchukuo after Harbin was incorporated into the jurisdiction of Binjiang Province. In March 1932, the Inspection Division of South Manchuria Railway started to draw up the Metropolitan Plan of Great Hsinking (simplified Chinese: 大新京都市计画; traditional Chinese: 大新京都市計畫; pinyin: Dà xīn jīngdū shì jìhuà). The Bureau of capital construction (国都建设局; 國都建設局; Guódū jiànshè jú) which was directly under the control of State Council of Manchukuo was established to take complete responsibility of the formulation and the implementation of the plan. Kuniaki Koiso, the Chief of Staff of the Kwantung Army, and Yasuji Okamura, the Vice Chief-of-Staff, finalized the plan of a 200 km^{2} (77 sq mi) construction area. The Metropolitan Plan of Great Hsinking was influenced by the renovation plan of Paris in the 19th century, the garden city movement, and theories of American cities' planning and design in the 1920s. The city development plan included extensive tree planting. By 1934 Hsinking was known as the Forest Capital with Jingyuetan Park built, which is now China's largest Plantation and a AAAA-rated recreational area.

In accordance with the Metropolitan Plan of Great Hsinking, the area of publicly shared land (including the Imperial Palace, government offices, roads, parks and athletic grounds) in Hsinking was 47 km^{2} (18 sq mi), whilst the area of residential, commercial and industrial developments was planned to be 53 km^{2} (20 sq mi). However, Hsinking's population exceeded the prediction of 500,000 by 1940. In 1941, the Capital Construction Bureau modified the original plan, which expanded the urban area to 160 km^{2} (62 sq mi). The new plan also focused on the construction of satellite towns around the city with a planning of 200 m^{2} (2,200 sq ft) land per capita. Because the effects of war, the Metropolitan Plan of Great Hsinking remained unfinished. By 1944, the built up urban area of Hsinking reached 80 km^{2} (31 sq mi), while the area used for greening reached 70.7 km^{2} (27.3 sq mi). As Hsinking's city orientation was the administrative center and military commanding center, land for military use exceeded the originally planned figure of 9 percent, while only light manufacturing including packing industry, cigarette industry and paper-making had been developed during this period. Japanese force also controlled Hsinking's police system, instead of Manchukuo government. Major officers of Hsinking police were all ethnic Japanese.

The population of Hsinking also experienced rapid growth after being established as the capital of Manchukuo. According to the census in 1934 taken by the police agency, the city's municipal area had 141,712 inhabitants. By 1944 the city's population had risen to 863,607, with 153,614 Japanese settlers. This population made Hsinking the third largest metropolitan city in Manchukuo after Mukden and Harbin, as the metropolitan mainly focused on military and political function.

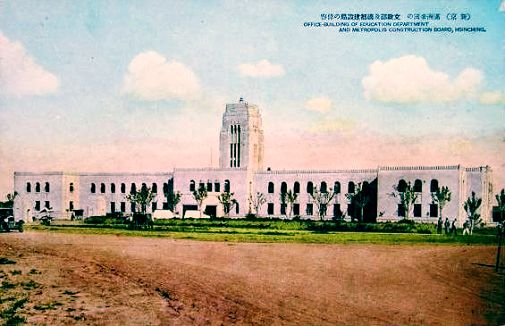
Special City Government office of Hsinking

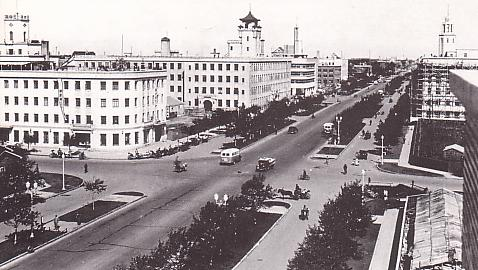
Datong Avenue in Hsinking (1939)

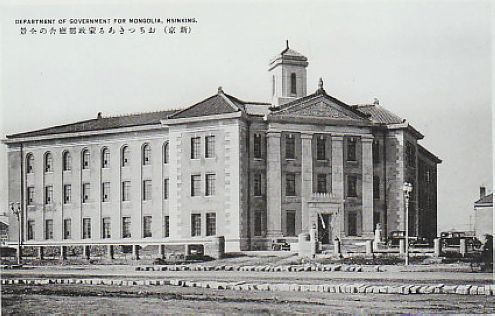
Manchukuo ministry building (built. 1935)

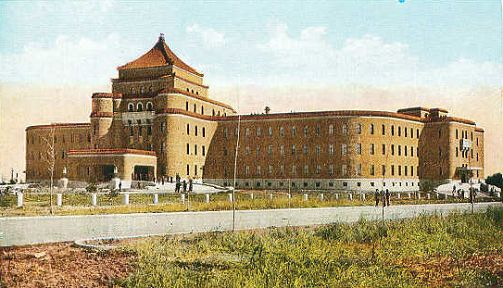
Manchukuo supreme court (built 1938)

==== Japanese chemical warfare agents ====
In 1936, the Imperial Japanese Army established Unit 100 to develop plague biological weapons, although the declared purpose of Unit 100 was to conduct research about diseases originating from animals. During the Second Sino-Japanese War (1937–1945) and World War II the headquarters of Unit 100 ("Wakamatsu Unit") was located in downtown Hsinking, under command of veterinarian Yujiro Wakamatsu. This facility was involved in research of animal vaccines to protect Japanese resources, and, especially, biological-warfare. Diseases were tested for use against Soviet and Chinese horses and other livestock. In addition to these tests, Unit 100 ran a bacteria factory to produce the pathogens needed by other units. Biological sabotage testing was also handled at this facility: everything from poisons to chemical crop destruction.

=== Siege of Changchun ===
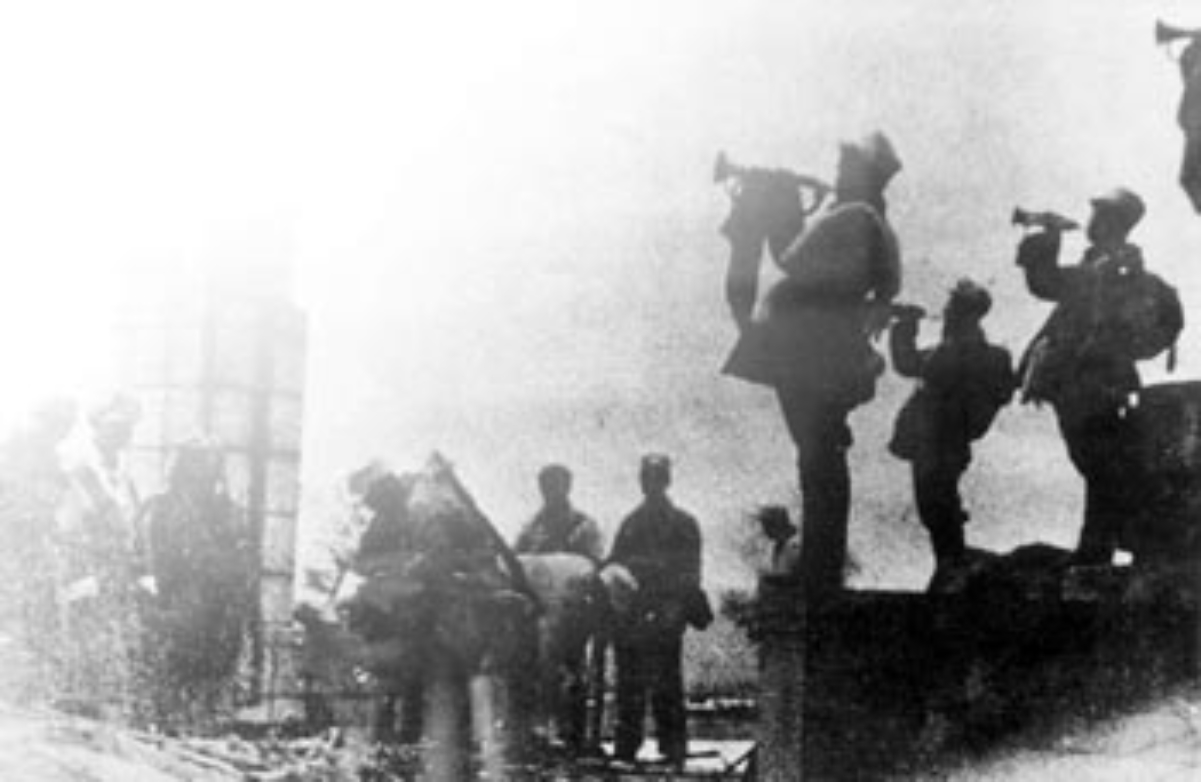
Chinese Red Army entering Changchun.

On 20 August 1945 the city was captured by the Soviet Red Army and renamed Changchun. The Russians maintained a presence in the city during the Soviet occupation of Manchuria until 1946.

National Revolutionary Army forces under Zheng Dongguo occupied the city in 1946, but were unable to hold the countryside against Lin Biao's People's Liberation Army forces during the Chinese Civil War. The city fell to the Chinese Communist Party in 1948 after the five-month Siege of Changchun, and the communist victory was a turning point which allowed an offensive to capture the remainder of Mainland China. Between 10 and 30 percent of the civilian population starved to death under the siege; estimates range from 150,000 to 330,000. As of 2015 the PRC government avoids all mention of the siege.

=== People's Republic ===
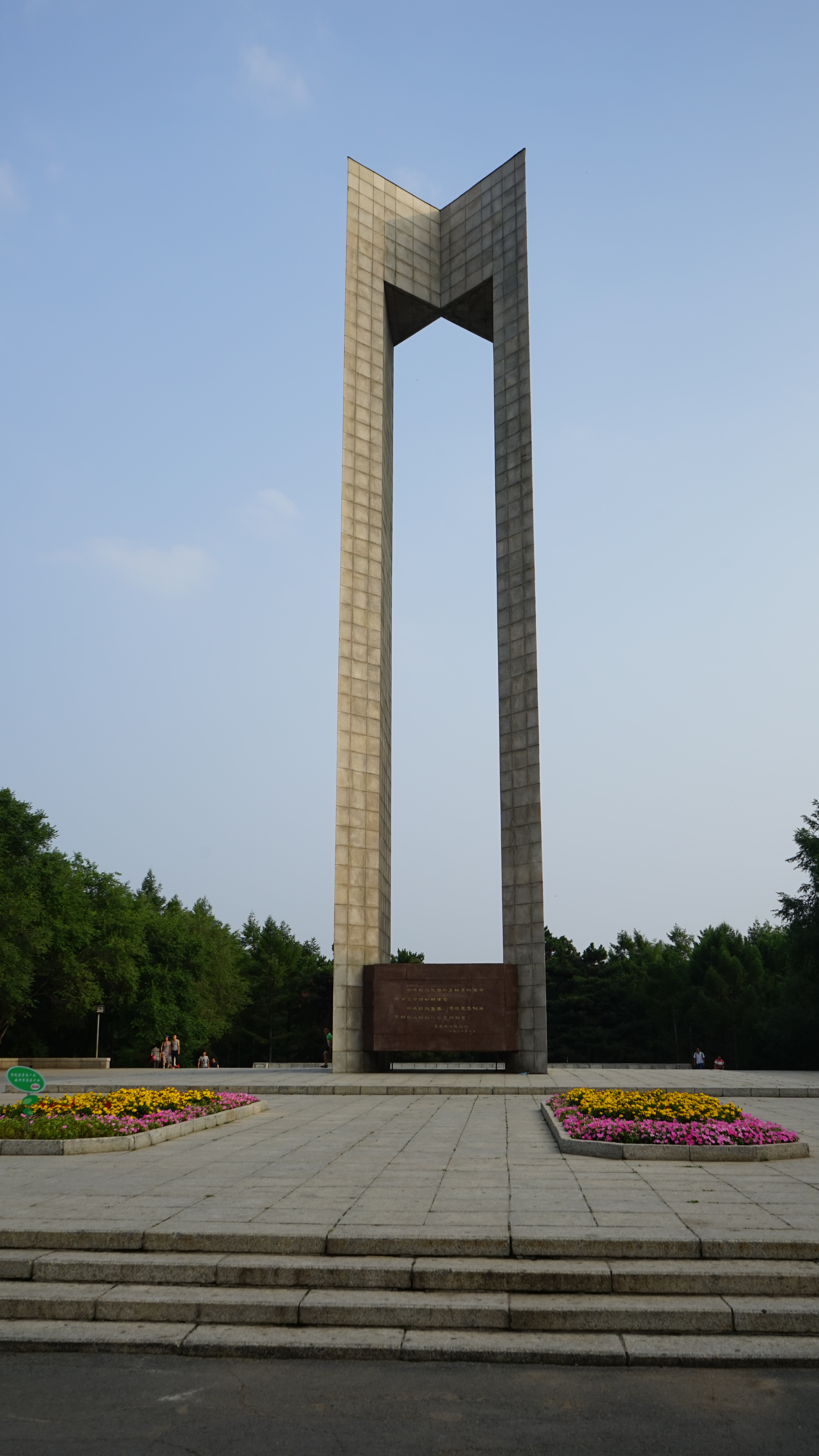
Changchun Liberation Monument

Renamed Changchun by the People's Republic of China government, it became the capital of Jilin in 1954. The Changchun Film Studio is also one of the remaining film studios of the era. Changchun Film Festival has become a unique gala for film industries since 1992.

From the 1950s, Changchun was designated to become a center for China's automotive industry. Construction of the First Automobile Works (FAW) began in 1953 and production of the Jiefang CA-10 truck, based on the Soviet ZIS-150 started in 1956. The Soviet Union lent assistance during these early years, providing technical support, tooling, and production machinery. In 1958, FAW introduced the famous Hongqi (Red Flag) limousines This series of cars are billed as "the official car for minister-level officials".

During the era of Xiagang (下岗: step down from the post), due to its heavy reliance on large state-owned enterprises (SOEs), especially in auto manufacturing (FAW) and traditional heavy industries, Changchun had, since the 1990s, grappled with issues of massive layoffs from enterprises that were financially struggling. Despite efforts by the central government to restructure such enterprises and integrate workers, the widespread unemployment as a result of Xiagang had nevertheless caused substantial decline in Changchun's economy, which fell behind other major Northeastern cities, and especially the booming coastal cities in Southern China.

In 2002, the local television broadcast was hijacked by a small group of Falun Gong practitioners. These events were depicted in the documentary Eternal Spring.

Changchun hosted the 2007 Winter Asian Games.

== Geography ==
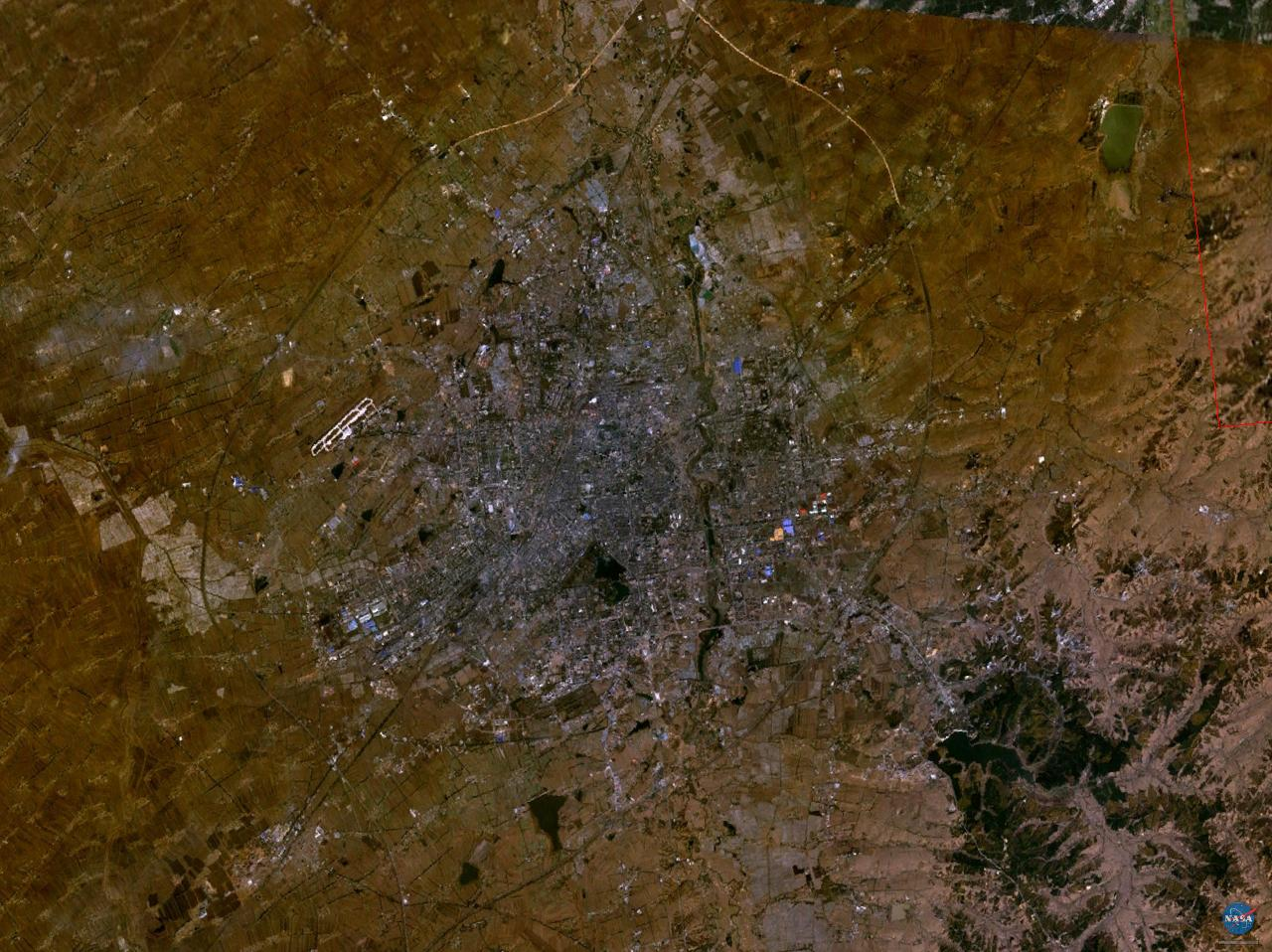
Changchun and vicinities, NASA World Wind screenshot, 2005-05-18

Changchun lies in the middle portion of the Northeast China Plain. Its municipality area is located at latitude 43° 05′−45° 15′ N and longitude 124° 18′−127° 02' E. The total area of Changchun municipality is 20,571 km^{2} (7,943 sq mi), including metro areas of 2,583 square kilometres (997 sq mi), and a city proper area of 159 km^{2} (61 sq mi). The city is situated at a moderate elevation, ranging from 250 to 350 metres (820 to 1,150 ft) within its administrative region. In the eastern portion of the city, there lies a small area of low mountains, with the Laodaodong Mountain, which has an altitude of 711 meters, being the highest. The city is also situated at the crisscross point of the third east–westward "Europe-Asia Continental Bridge". Changchun prefecture is dotted with 222 rivers and lakes. The Yitong River, a small tributary of the Songhua River, runs through the city proper.

=== Climate ===
Changchun has a four-season, monsoon-influenced, humid continental climate (Köppen Dwa, Trewartha Dcac). Winters are long (lasting from November to March), cold, and windy, but dry, due to the influence of the Siberian anticyclone, with a January mean temperature of −14.3 °C (6.3 °F). Spring and autumn are somewhat short transitional periods, with some precipitation, but are usually dry and windy. Summers are hot and humid, with a prevailing southeasterly wind due to the East Asian monsoon; July averages 23.7 °C (74.7 °F). Snow is usually light during the winter, and annual rainfall is heavily concentrated from June to August. With monthly percent possible sunshine ranging from 49 percent in July to 69 percent in February, a typical year will see around 2,597 hours of sunshine, and a frost-free period of 140 to 150 days. Extreme temperatures have ranged from −36.5 °C (−34 °F) on 4 January 1970 to 38.0 °C (100 °F) on 9 July 1951.

Climate data for Changchun, elevation 237 m (778 ft), (1991–2020 normals, extremes 1951–present)
Month	Jan	Feb	Mar	Apr	May	Jun	Jul	Aug	Sep	Oct	Nov	Dec	Year
Record high °C (°F)	5.6 (42.1)	15.3 (59.5)	23.4 (74.1)	31.9 (89.4)	35.7 (96.3)	36.7 (98.1)	38.0 (100.4)	35.6 (96.1)	30.6 (87.1)	28.2 (82.8)	20.7 (69.3)	11.7 (53.1)	38.0 (100.4)
Mean daily maximum °C (°F)	−9.3 (15.3)	−3.9 (25.0)	4.5 (40.1)	14.8 (58.6)	22.0 (71.6)	26.5 (79.7)	28.1 (82.6)	26.9 (80.4)	22.3 (72.1)	13.7 (56.7)	2.0 (35.6)	−7.1 (19.2)	11.7 (53.1)
Daily mean °C (°F)	−14.3 (6.3)	−9.3 (15.3)	−1 (30)	8.8 (47.8)	16.2 (61.2)	21.3 (70.3)	23.7 (74.7)	22.3 (72.1)	16.5 (61.7)	7.9 (46.2)	−2.8 (27.0)	−11.8 (10.8)	6.5 (43.6)
Mean daily minimum °C (°F)	−18.6 (−1.5)	−14.3 (6.3)	−6.1 (21.0)	3.0 (37.4)	10.5 (50.9)	16.3 (61.3)	19.7 (67.5)	18.2 (64.8)	11.2 (52.2)	2.8 (37.0)	−7.1 (19.2)	−15.9 (3.4)	1.6 (35.0)
Record low °C (°F)	−36.5 (−33.7)	−31.9 (−25.4)	−28.0 (−18.4)	−15.9 (3.4)	−3.4 (25.9)	4.5 (40.1)	10.6 (51.1)	3.9 (39.0)	−3.7 (25.3)	−13.4 (7.9)	−24.8 (−12.6)	−33.2 (−27.8)	−36.5 (−33.7)
Average precipitation mm (inches)	4.4 (0.17)	6.1 (0.24)	13.4 (0.53)	22.0 (0.87)	62.6 (2.46)	122.1 (4.81)	167.5 (6.59)	131.6 (5.18)	54.9 (2.16)	24.6 (0.97)	16.9 (0.67)	8.2 (0.32)	634.3 (24.97)
Average precipitation days (≥ 0.1 mm)	5.1	4.4	5.6	6.5	11.0	13.5	13.4	12.3	8.1	6.8	6.1	6.5	99.3
Average snowy days	7.5	5.9	6.4	2.4	0.1	0	0	0	0	1.9	6.1	8.2	38.5
Average relative humidity (%)	66	57	51	44	50	63	75	76	65	59	62	67	61
Mean monthly sunshine hours	180.9	203.7	236.9	238.1	253.5	245.4	229.0	235.3	236.8	210.4	167.7	159.1	2,596.8
Percentage possible sunshine	62	69	64	59	55	53	49	55	64	62	59	58	59
Average ultraviolet index	1	2	3	5	6	7	8	8	5	3	1	1	4
Source 1: China Meteorological Administration Weather ChinaNOAAall-time February high
Source 2: Weather Atlas

== Administrative divisions ==
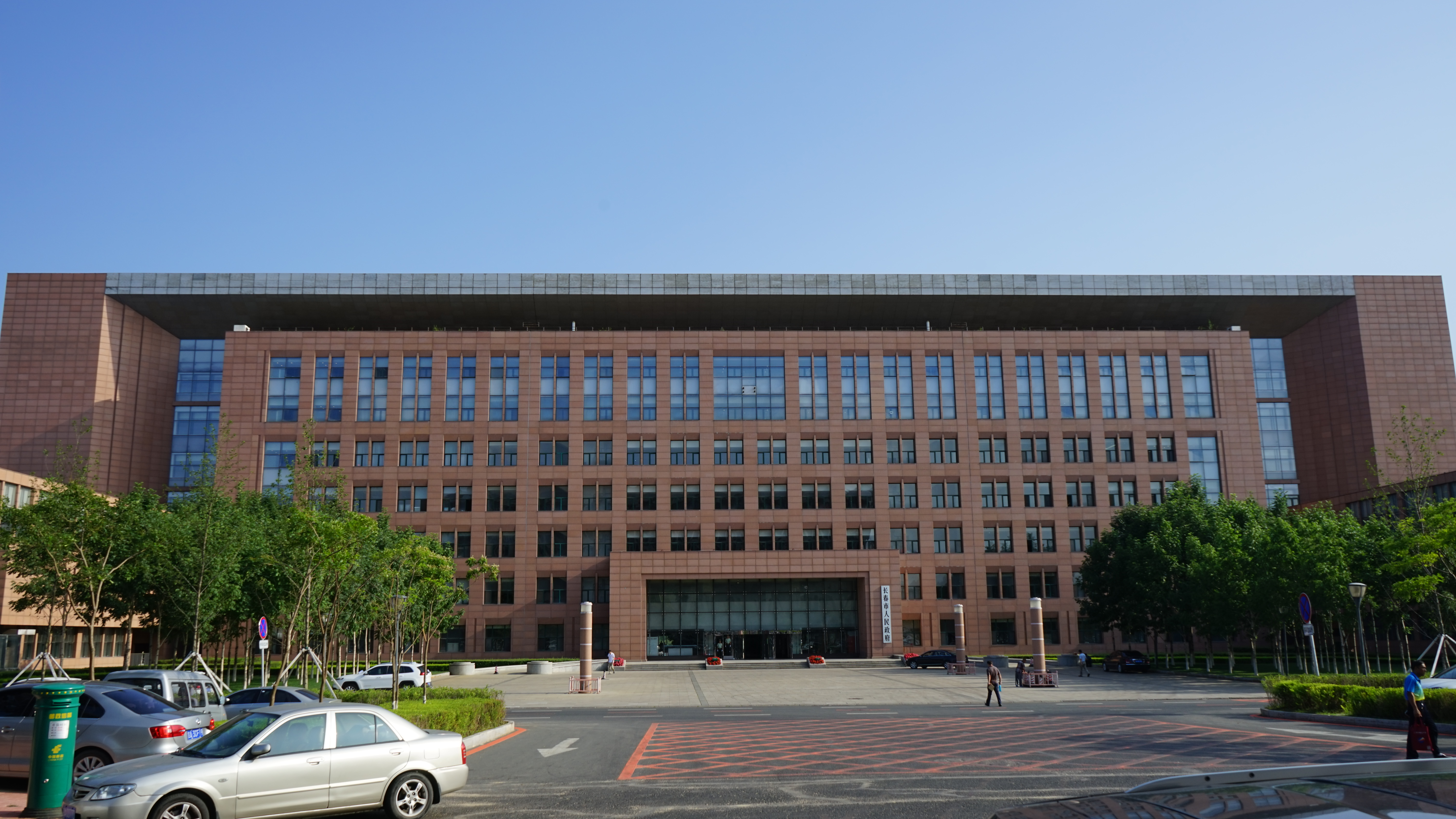
Changchun City People's Government

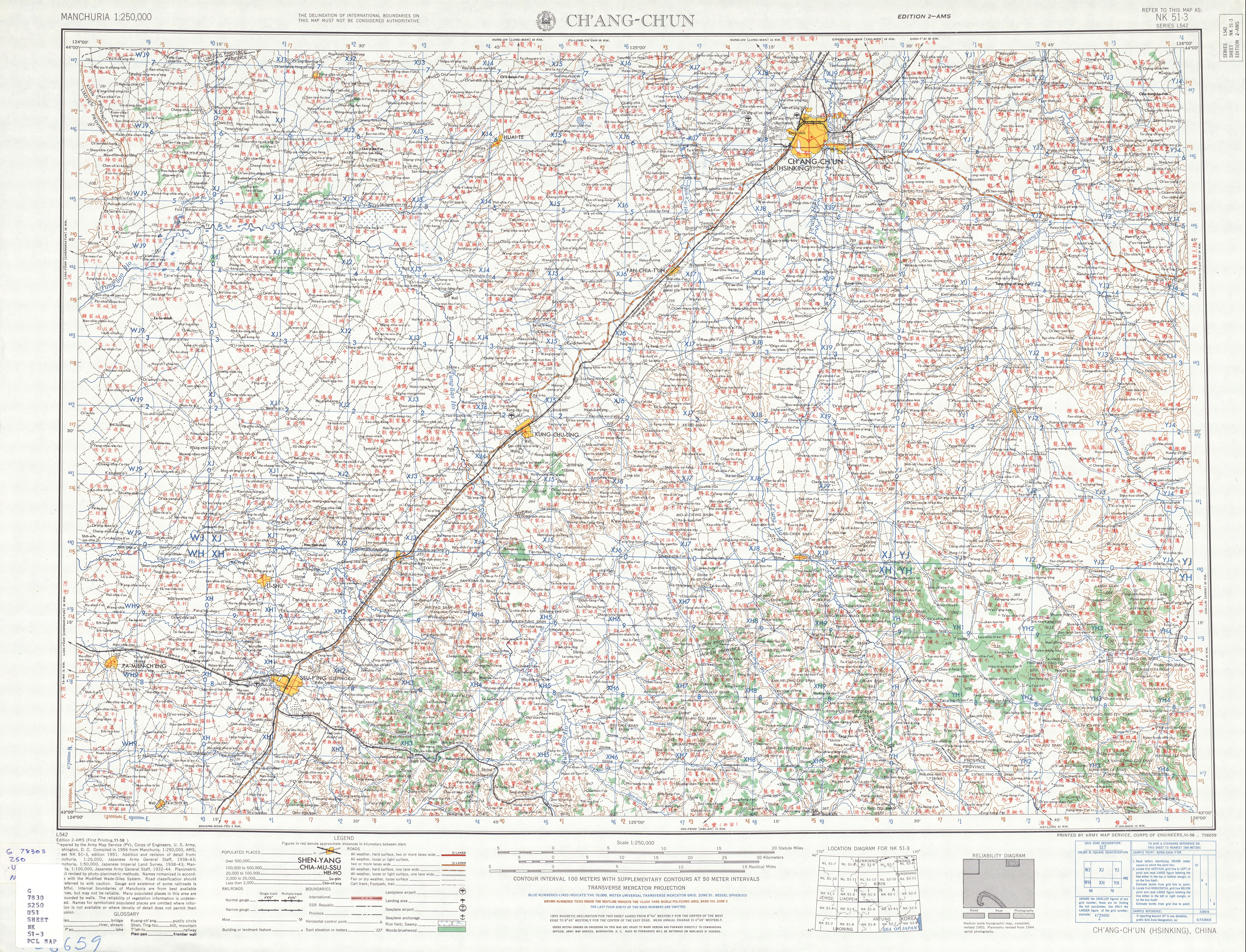
Map including Changchun (labeled as 長春 CH'ANG-CH'UN (HSINKING)) (AMS, 1956)

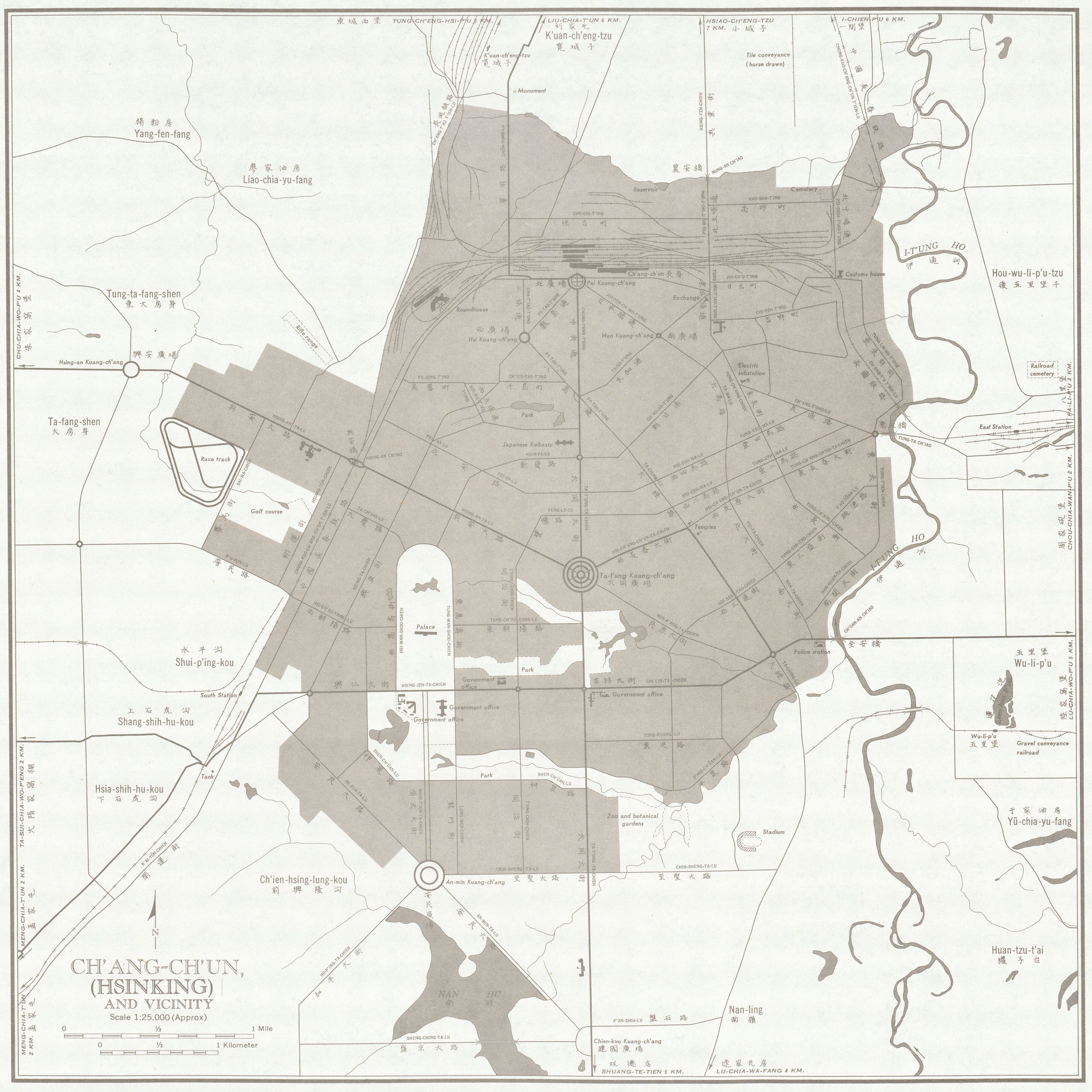
Map of Changchun (CH'ANG-CHUN (HSINKING))

The sub-provincial city of Changchun has direct jurisdiction over 7 districts, 3 county-level cities and 1 County:

Map
Name	Simplified Chinese	Hanyu Pinyin	Population (2020 census)	Area (km^{2})
City proper
Nanguan District	南关区	Nánguān Qū	1,066,422	529.7
Chaoyang District	朝阳区	Cháoyáng Qū	1,074,628	286.7
Kuancheng District	宽城区	Kuānchéng Qū	856,177	941.5
Erdao District	二道区	Èrdào Qū	559,966	452
Luyuan District	绿园区	Lùyuán Qū	1.002,672	492.6
Suburb
Shuangyang District	双阳区	Shuāngyáng Qū	335,723	1,677
Jiutai District	九台区	Jiǔtái Qū	613,836	3368
Satellite cities
Dehui	德惠市	Déhuì Shì	635,476	2,984
Yushu	榆树市	Yúshù Shì	836,098	4,749
Gongzhuling	公主岭市	Gōngzhǔlǐng Shì	862,313	4,145
Rural
Nong'an County	农安县	Nóng'ān Xiàn	763,983	5,239

== Demographics ==
Historical population
Year	Pop.	±%
1932	104,305	—
1934	160,381	+53.8%
1939	415,473	+159.1%
1944	863,607	+107.9%
1953	855,197	−1.0%
1964	4,221,445	+393.6%
1982	5,744,769	+36.1%
1990	6,421,956	+11.8%
2000	7,135,439	+11.1%
2010	7,677,089	+7.6%
Population size may be affected by changes in administrative divisions. In 1958, 5 counties were put under Changchun's jurisdiction, increasing the total population to over 4 million.

According to the Sixth China Census, the total population of the City of Changchun reached 7.677 million in 2010. The statistics in 2011 estimated the total population to be 7.59 million. The birth rate was 6.08 per thousand and the death rate was 5.51 per thousand. The urban area had a population of 3.53 million people. In 2010 the sex ratio of the city population was 102.10 males to 100 females.

=== Ethnic groups ===
As in most of Northeastern China the ethnic makeup of Changchun is predominantly Han nationality (96.57 percent), with several other minority nationalities.

Ethnicity	Population	Percentage
Han	6,883,310	96.47%
Manchu	142,998	2.0%
Korean	49,588	0.69%
Hui	43,692	0.61%
Mongol	11,106	0.16%
Xibe	685	0.01%
Zhuang	533	0.01%
Miao	522	0.01%
Other	3,005	0.04%

== Culture ==
=== Dialect ===
The Changchun dialect is a variety of Northeastern Mandarin. After the PRC was established, the rapid economic growth in Changchun attracted a huge number of immigrants from various places, so the northeastern dialect spoken in urban areas of Changchun is closer to Standard Mandarin Chinese than in rural areas because the immigrants had a great impact on the northeastern dialect spoken in urban areas.

=== Religion ===
Changchun has four major religions: Buddhism, Taoism, Christianity, and Islam. There are 396 government-approved places for religious activities and worship services.

The temples in Changchun include Changchun Wanshou Temple, Baoguo Prajna Temple, Baiguo Xinglong Temple, Pumen Temple, Big Buddha Temple, Changchun Temple, Changchun Catholic Church, Changchun West Wuma Road Christian Church, and Changchun City Mosque.

Shamanism had been circulated in Northeast China during ancient times and was believed by many Manchus. Now the shamanism and the study of it have become an important cultural heritage of the region.

=== Places of interest ===
Jilin Provincial Museum, a national first-grade museum, is located in Changchun. The museum was moved to Changchun from Jilin City after the transfer of the provincial government seat. It was originally located in the centre of the old town, but, after nine years of construction, a new building for the museum's collections was completed in 2016 on the city's outskirts in Nanguan District near Jingyuetan Park. Badabu is a group of buildings of the former eight Manchukuo ministries which are Ministry of Public Safety, Ministry of Justice, Ministry of Economy, Ministry of Communications, Ministry of Agriculture, Ministry of Culture and Education, Ministry of Foreign Affairs, Ministry of Civil Affairs that has recently become a sightseeing highlight because of their unique combined Chinese, Japanese and Manchurian architecture.

Jingyuetan National Forest Park is located to the southeast of the city, and is one of the AAAAA Tourist Attractions of China. The park hosts Vasaloppet China annually.

== Economy ==
Changchun achieved a gross domestic product (GDP) of RMB332.9 billion in 2010, representing a rise of 15.3 percent year on year. Primary industry output increased by 3.3 percent to RMB25.27 billion. Secondary industry output experienced an increase of 19.0 percent, reaching RMB171.99 billion, while the tertiary industry output increased 12.6 percent to RMB135.64 billion. The GDP per capita of Changchun was ¥58,691 in 2012, which equates to $9338. The GDP of Changchun in 2012 was RMB445.66 billion and increased 12.0 percent compared with 2011. The primary industry grew 4.3 percent to RMB31.71 billion. Secondary industry increased by RMB229.19 billion, which is a rise of 13.1 percent year on year. Tertiary industry of Changchun in 2012 grew 11.8 percent and increased by RMB184.76 billion.

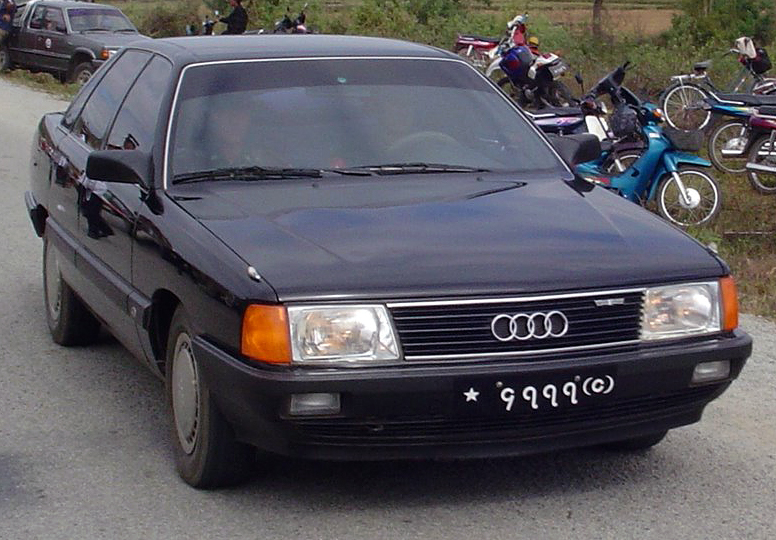
A FAW-built Audi 100

The city's leading industries are production of automobiles, agricultural product processing, biopharmaceuticals, photo electronics, construction materials, and the energy industry. Changchun is the largest automobile manufacturing, research and development centre in China, producing 9 percent of the country's automobiles in 2009. Changchun is home to China's biggest vehicle producer FAW (First Automotive Works) Group, which manufactured the first Chinese truck in 1956 and car in 1958. The automaker's factories and associated housing and services occupy a substantial portion of the city's southwest end. Specific brands produced in Changchun include the Red Flag luxury brand, as well as joint ventures with Audi, Volkswagen, and Toyota. In 2012, FAW sold 2.65 million units of auto. The sales revenue of FAW amounted to RMB 408.46 billion, representing a rise of 10.8% on year. As cradle of the auto industry, one of Changchun's better known nicknames is "China's Detroit".

Manufacturing of transportation facilities and machinery is also among Changchun's main industries. 50 percent of China's passenger trains, and 10 percent of tractors are produced in Changchun. Changchun Railway Vehicles, one of the main divisions of CRRC, has a joint venture established with Bombardier Transportation to build Movia metro cars for the Guangzhou Metro and Shanghai Metro, and the Tianjin Metro.

Foreign direct investment in the city was US$3.68 billion in 2012, up 19.6% year on year. In 2004 Coca-Cola set up a bottling plant in the city's ETDZ with an investment of US$20 million.

Changchun hosts the yearly Changchun International Automobile Fair, Changchun Film Festival, Changchun Agricultural Fair, Education Exhibition and the Sculpture Exhibition.

CRRC manufactures most of its bullet train carriages at its factory in Changchun. In November 2016, CRCC Changchun unveiled the first bullet train carriages in the world with sleeper berths, thus extending their use for overnight passages across China. They would be capable of running in ultra low temperature environments. Nicknamed Panda, the new bullet trains are capable of running at 250 km/h, operate at −40 degrees Celsius, have Wi-Fi hubs and contain sleeper berths that fold into seats during the day.

Other large companies in Changchun include:

- Yatai Group, established in 1993 and listed on the Shanghai Stock Exchange in 1995. It has developed into a major conglomerate involved in a wide range of industries including property development, cement manufacturing, securities, coal mining, pharmaceuticals and trading.
- Jilin Grain Group, a major processor of grains.

=== Development zones ===
==== Changchun Automotive Economic Trade and Development Zone ====
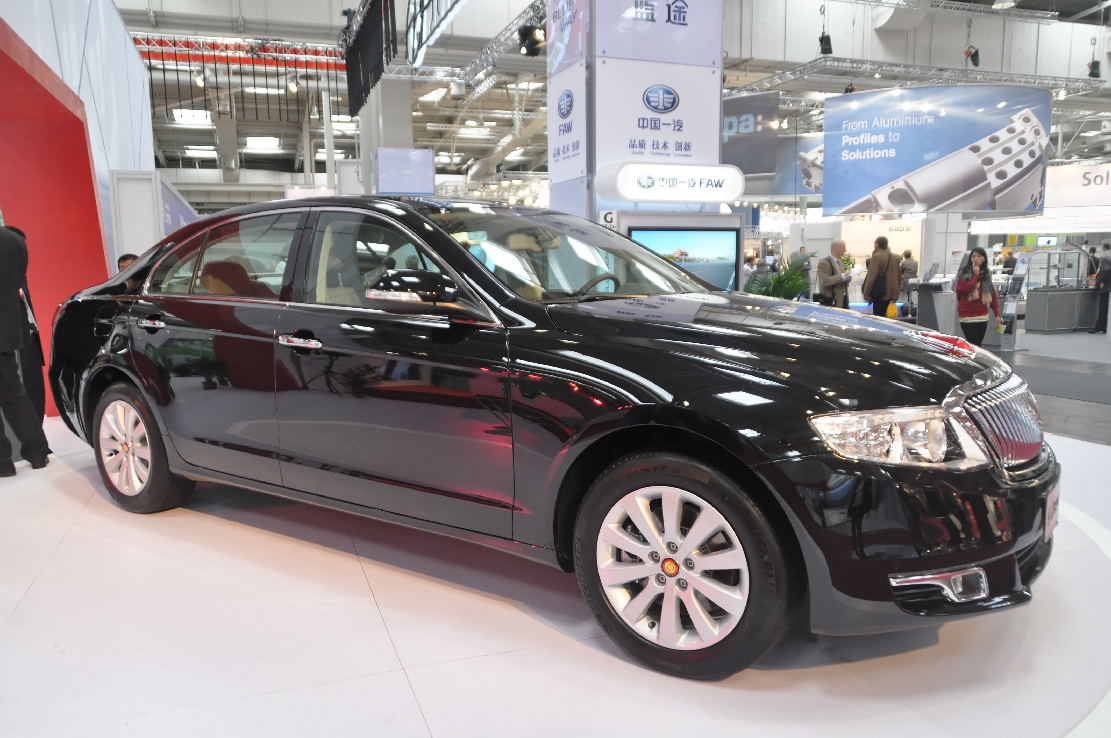
A Hongqi H7 manufactured in Changchun's FAW Company on display at the 2012 Hannover-Messe

Founded in 1993, the Changchun Automotive Trade Center was re-established as the Changchun Automotive Economic Trade and Development Zone in 1996. The development zone is situated in the southwest of the city and is adjacent to the China First Automobile Works Group Corporation and the Changchun Film ThemeCity. It covers a total area of approximately 300,000 square metres (3,229,173 square feet). Within the development zone lies an exhibition center and five specially demarcated industrial centers. The Changchun Automobile Wholesale Center began operations in 1994 and is the largest auto-vehicle and spare parts wholesale center in China. The other centers include a resale center for used auto-vehicles, a specialized center for industrial/commercial vehicles, and a tire wholesale center.

==== Changchun High Technology Development Zone ====
The zone is one of the first 27 state-level advanced technology development zones and is situated in the southern part of the city, covering a total area of 49 km^{2} (19 sq mi). There are 18 full-time universities and colleges, 39 state and provincial-level scientific research institutions, and 11 key national laboratories. The zone is mainly focusing on developing five main industries, namely bio-engineering, automobile engineering, new material fabrication, photo-electricity, and information technology.

==== Changchun Economic and Technological Development Zone ====
Established in April 1993, the zone enjoys all the preferential policies stipulated for economic and technological development zones of coastal open cities. The total area of CETDZ is 112.72 square kilometres (43.52 square miles), of which 30 square kilometres (12 square miles) has been set aside for development and utilization. It is located 5 kilometres (3 miles) from downtown Changchun, 2 km (1.2 mi) from the freight railway station and 15 km (9 mi) from the Changchun international airport. The zone is devoted to developing five leading industries: namely automotive parts and components, photoelectric information, bio-pharmaceutical, fine processing of foods, and new building materials. In particular, high-tech and high value added projects account for over 80 percent of total output. In 2006 the zone's total fixed assets investment rose to RMB38.4 billion. Among the total of 1656 enterprises registered, 179 are foreign-funded. The zone also witnessed a total industrial output of RMB 277 billion in 2007.

Capitalizing on its status as a major grain production base and a regional air-rail hub, Changchun has developed a specialized Aviation Food Industrialization Base. The base supplies prepared meals to multiple airlines and researches food science for long-haul flights, representing a niche manufacturing sector.

== Infrastructure ==
Changchun is a very compact city, planned by the Japanese with a layout of open avenues and public squares. The city is developing its layout in a long-term bid to alleviate pressure on limited land, aid economic development, and absorb a rising population. According to a draft plan up until 2020, the downtown area will expand southwards to form a new city center around Changchun World Sculpture Park, Weixing Square and their outskirts, and the new development zone. For the north of the city, there is a new development zone called "Changchun New Area", locate near the North Lake Park.

== Transport ==
=== Railways ===
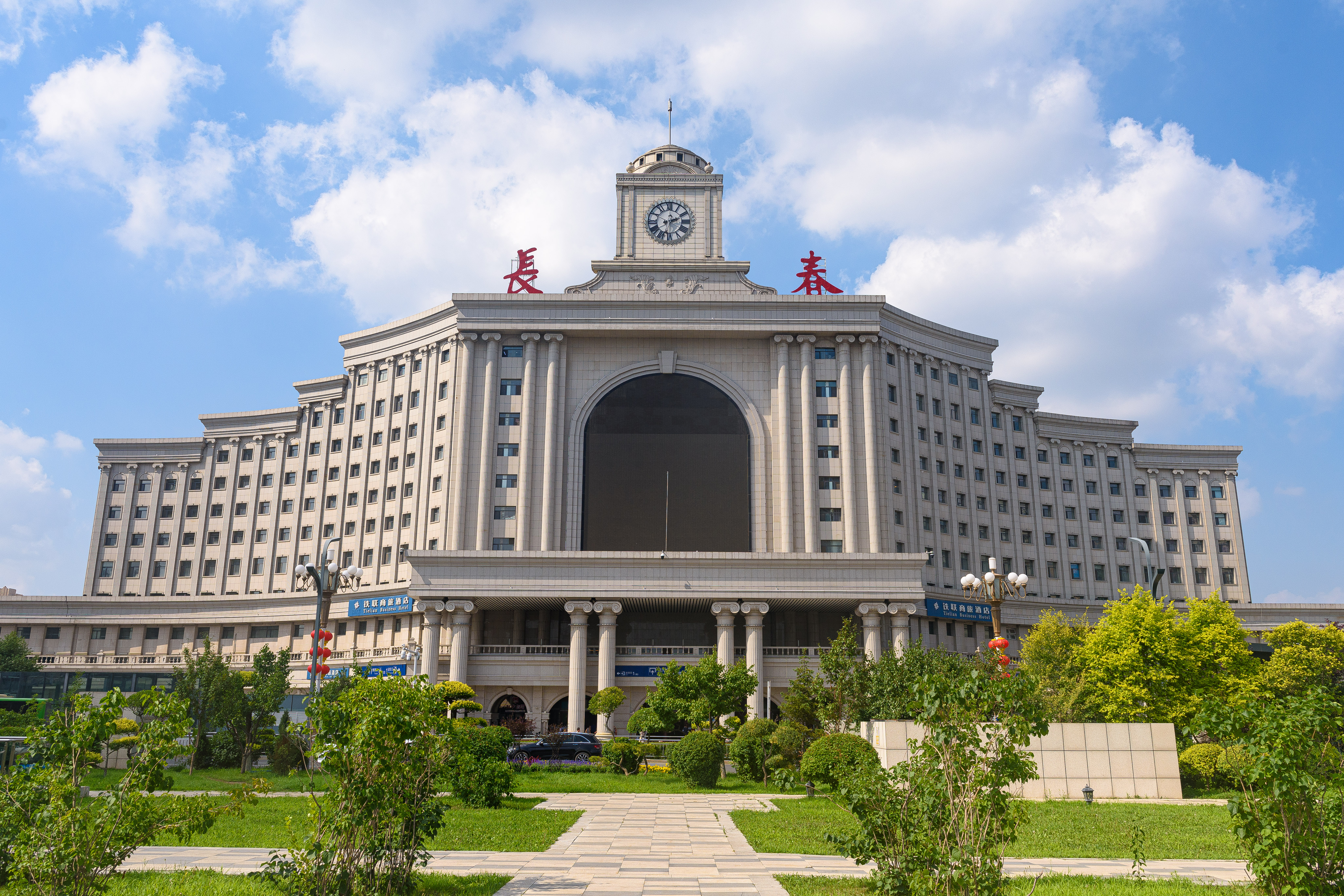
Changchun railway station

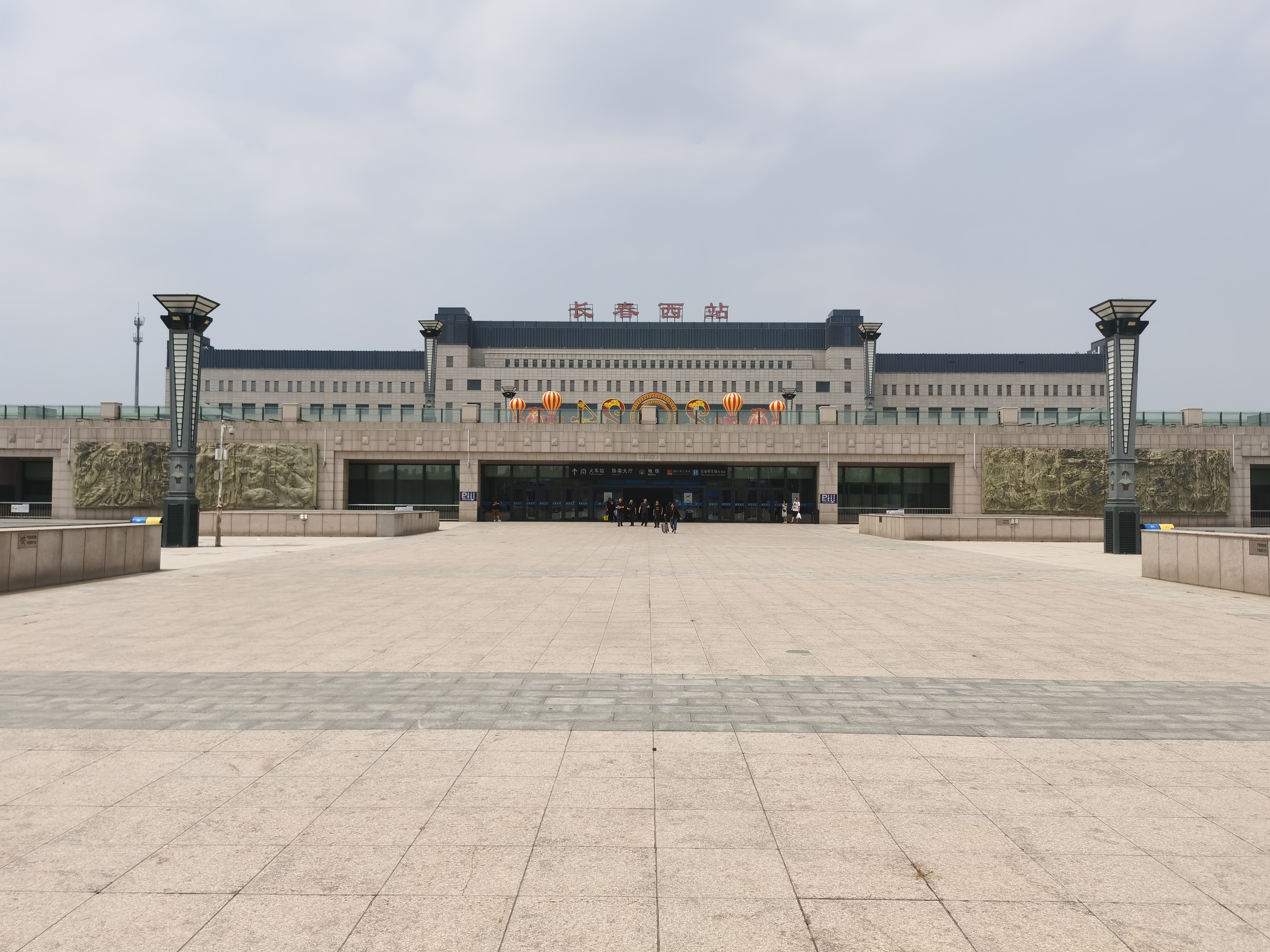
Changchun West railway station

Changchun has two major passenger rail stations. All conventional trains and some high-speed trains stop at the central Changchun railway station (simplified Chinese: 长春站; traditional Chinese: 長春站), which is connected by Beijing-Harbin Railway, Changchun-Hunchun intercity railway and several railway lines. The station has multiple daily departures to other cities in the province and northeast area, such as Jilin City, Yanji, Harbin, Shenyang, and Dalian, as well as other major cities throughout the country including Beijing, Shanghai and Guangzhou. The new Changchun West railway station, situated in the western end of urbanized area, is the station mainly for the high-speed trains of the Harbin–Dalian high-speed railway. The Changchun East railway station, a small station in the district of Erdao, is on the Changchun-Tumen line.

=== Bus and Tram ===
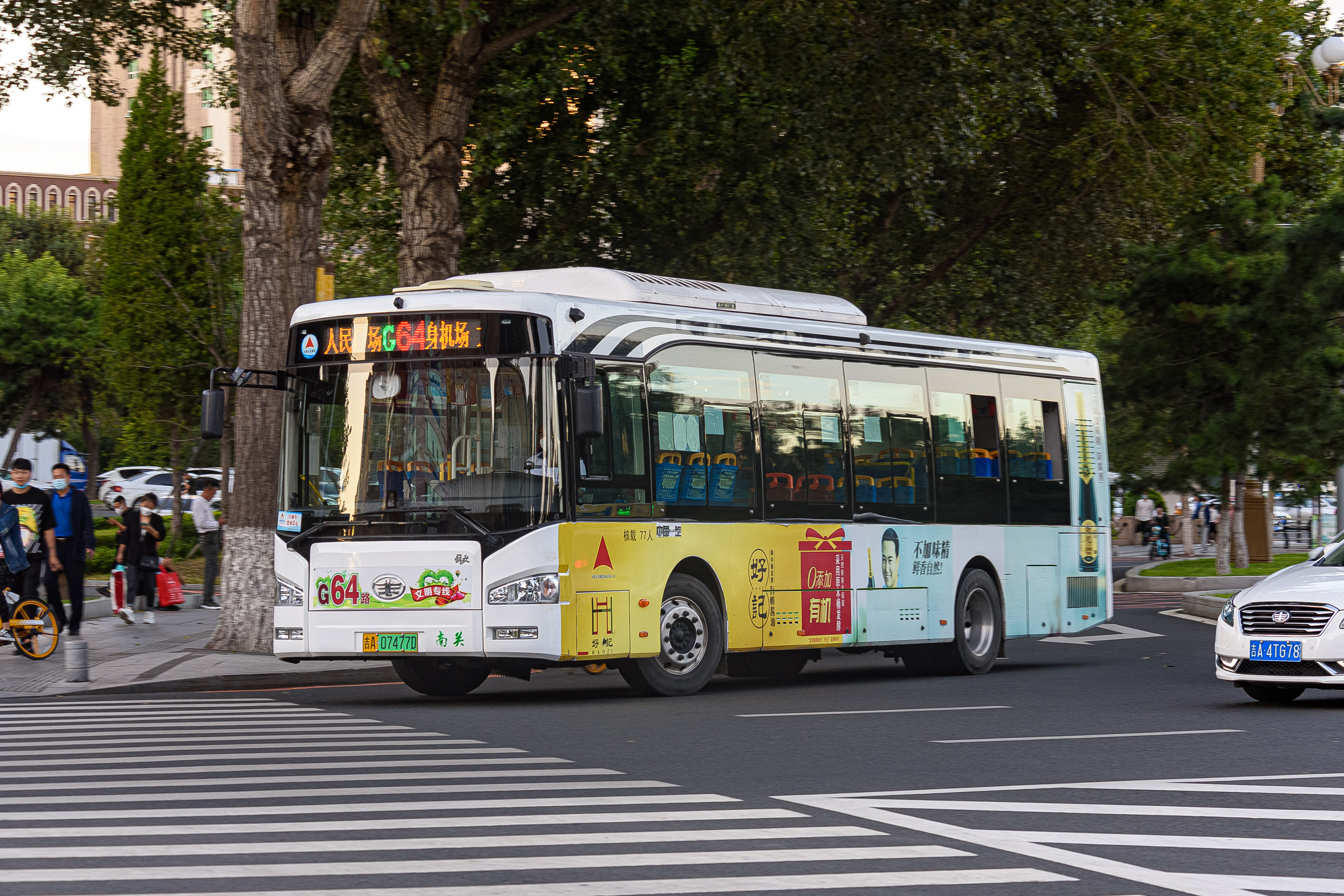
Changchun Bus

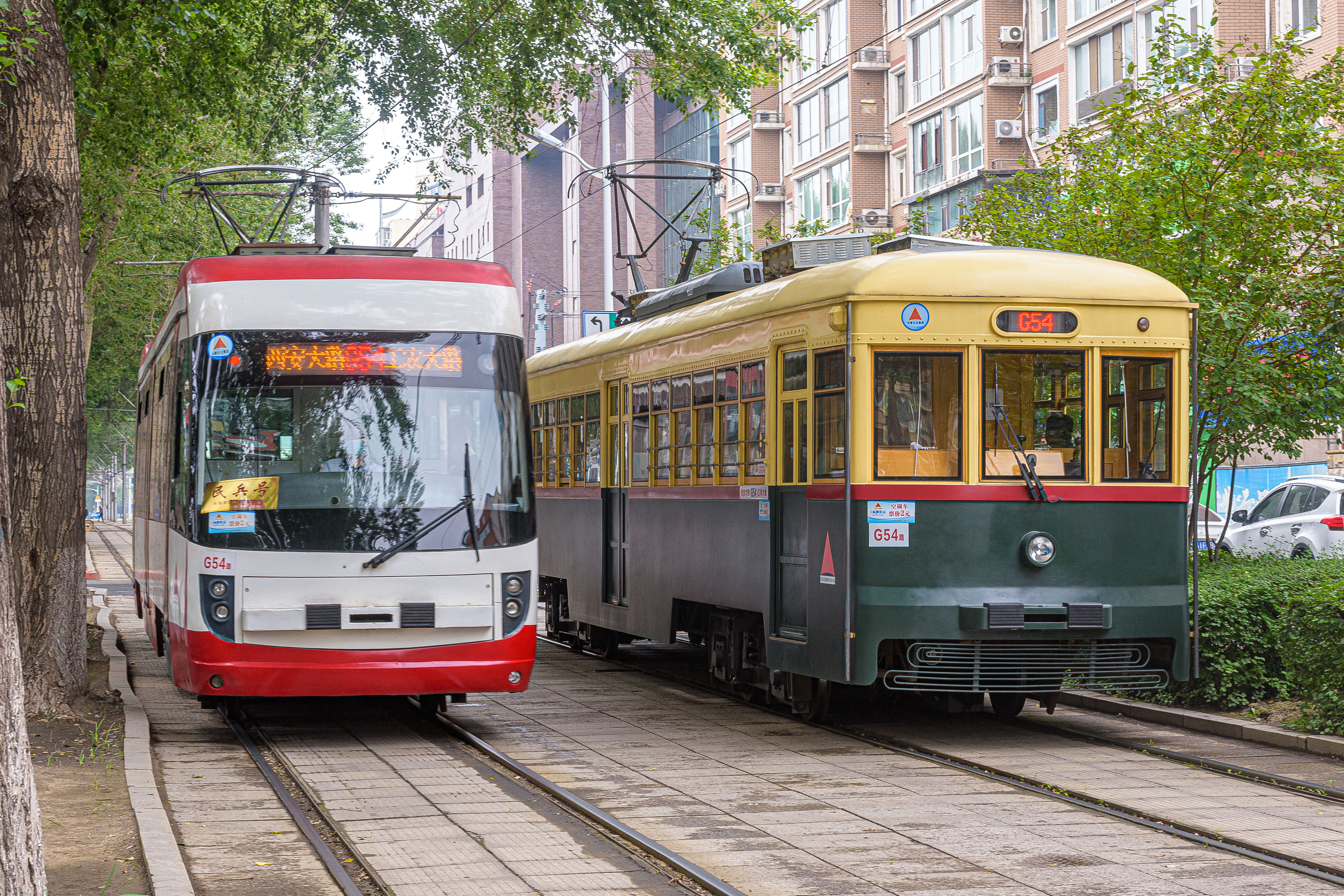
Changchun trams of two different models

Changchun is served by a comprehensive bus system, which having more than 250 bus route, most buses charge 1–2 yuan per ride.

Changchun is one of the few cities preserving the historic tram system in China. The tram system first opened in 1941, having 6 lines covering almost 53 km at its peak. But after several route adjustments, there is only one line left since the 2000s. A new branch line is opened in 2014, which links the new Changchun West Railway Station. The whole system is now operated under the bus system of Changchun.

=== Rapid Transit ===
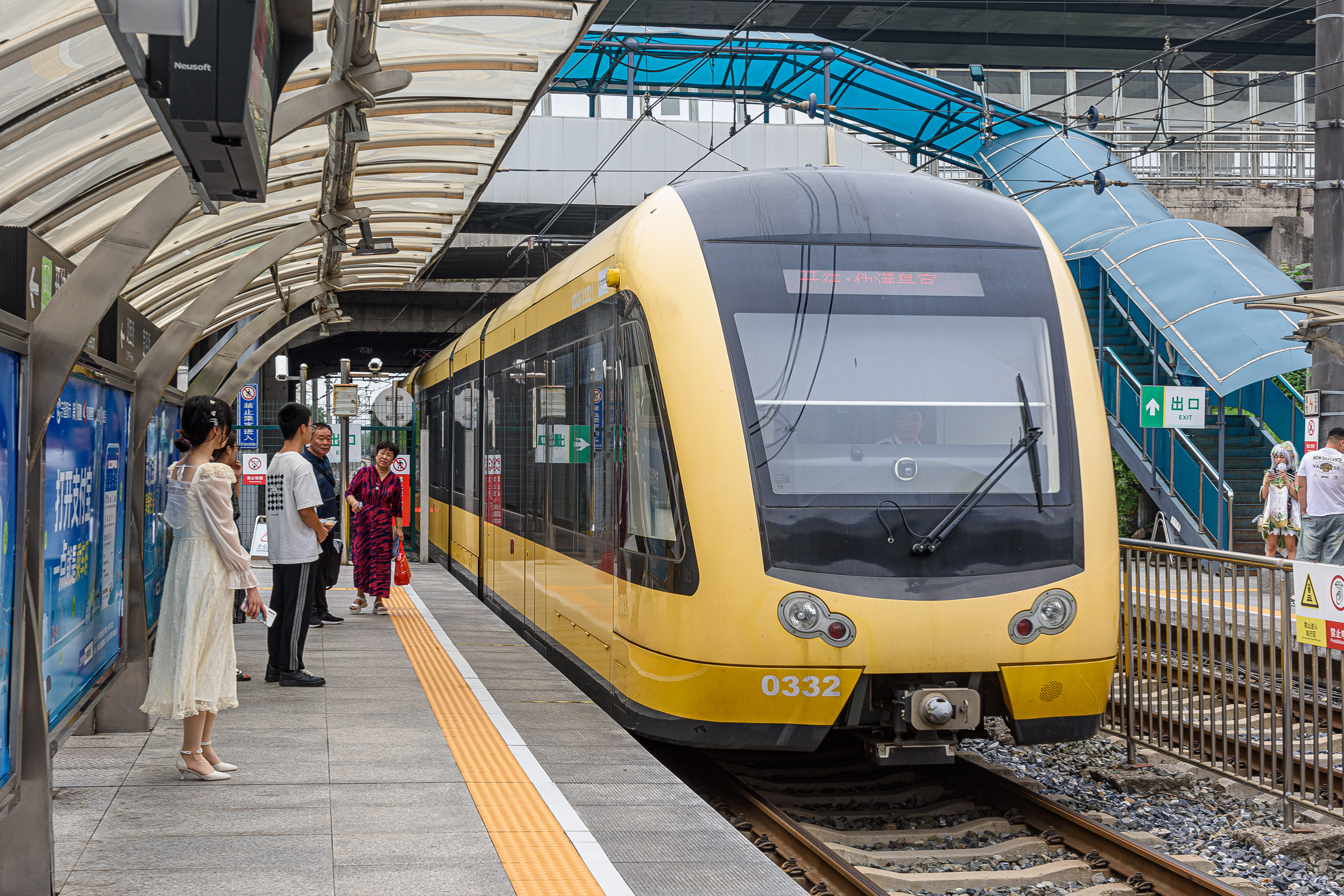
Changchun Rail Transit Line 3 train

Changchun Rail Transit is a rapid transit system of Changchun, combining light rail lines and metro lines. Its first line was opened on 30 October 2002, making Changchun the fifth metropolitan city in China to open rail transit.

Till November 2018, there are 5 lines in Changchun, including Line 1, Line 2, Line 3, Line 4, and Line 8. Changchun railway covers about 100.17 kilometers.

Till September 2019, there are 4 lines of Changchun Rail Transit under construction, including Line 6 and Line 9, as well as Line 2 West Extension and Line 3 East Extension. By 2025, the Changchun rail transit line network will consist of 10 lines with a total length of 341.62 kilometers.

In September 2019, the average daily passenger volume of Changchun Rail Transit reached 680,400 person, and the maximum daily passenger volume of its line network was 830,500 person on 13 November 2019. The total estimated passenger volume in 2019 is about 168 million person.

=== Road network ===
Changchun is linked to the national highway network through the Beijing – Harbin Expressway (G1), the Ulanhot – Changchun – Jilin – Hunchun Expressway (G12), the Changchun – Shenzhen Expressway (G25), the Changchun – Changbaishan Expressway (S1) and the busiest section in the province, the Changchun–Jilin North Highway. This section connects the two biggest cities in Jilin and is the trunk line for the social and economic communication of the two cities.

Private automobiles are becoming very common on the city's congested streets. Bicycles are relatively rare compared to other northeastern Chinese cities, but mopeds, as well as pedal are relatively common.

=== Air ===
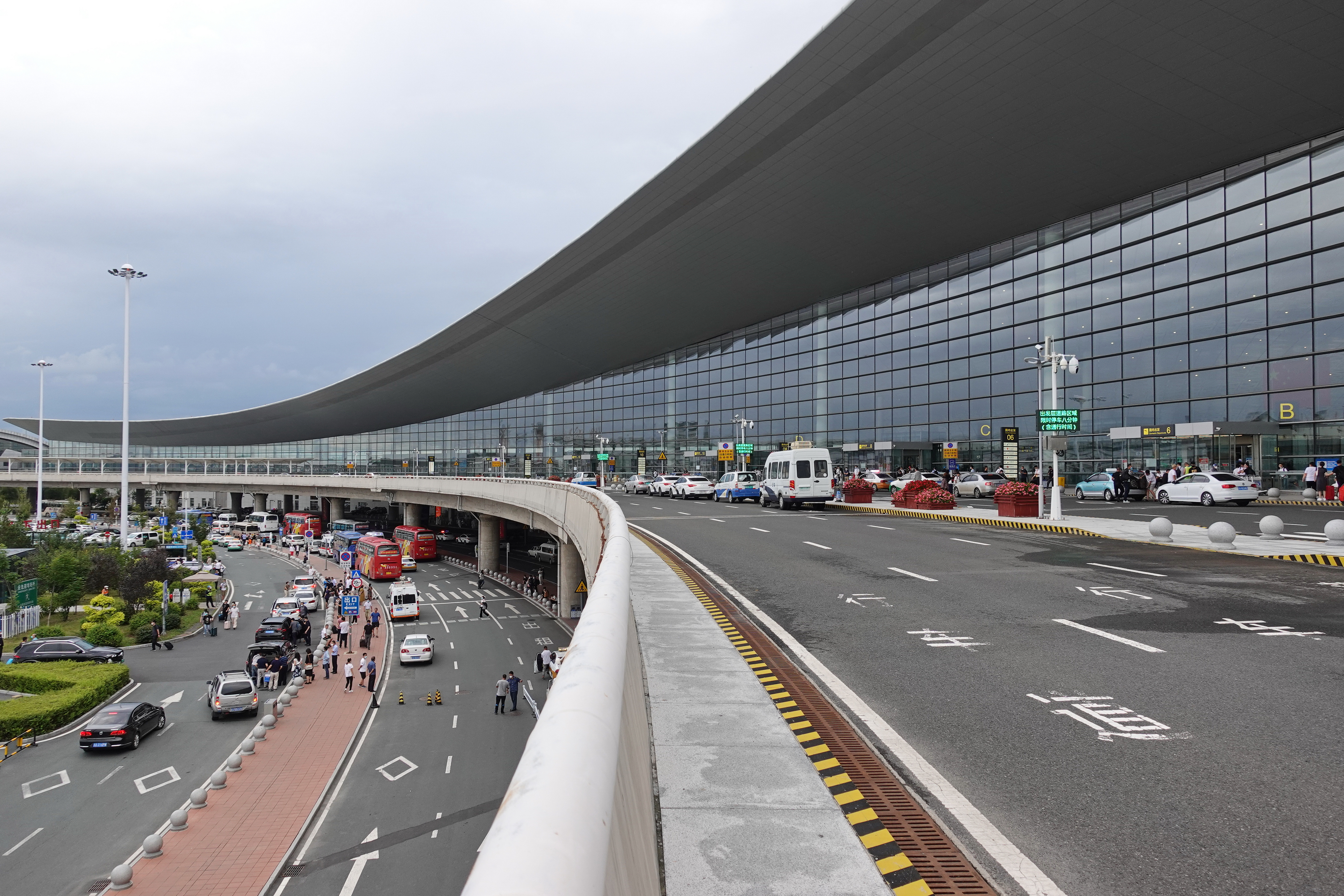
Changchun Longjia International Airport Terminal 2

Changchun Longjia International Airport is located 31.2 kilometres (19.4 miles) north-east of Changchun urban area. The airport's construction began in 1998, and was intended to replace the older Changchun Dafangshen Airport, which was a joint-use airport built in 1941. The airport opened for passenger service on 27 August 2005. The operation of the airport is shared by both Changchun and nearby Jilin City.

== Education ==
=== Universities and colleges ===
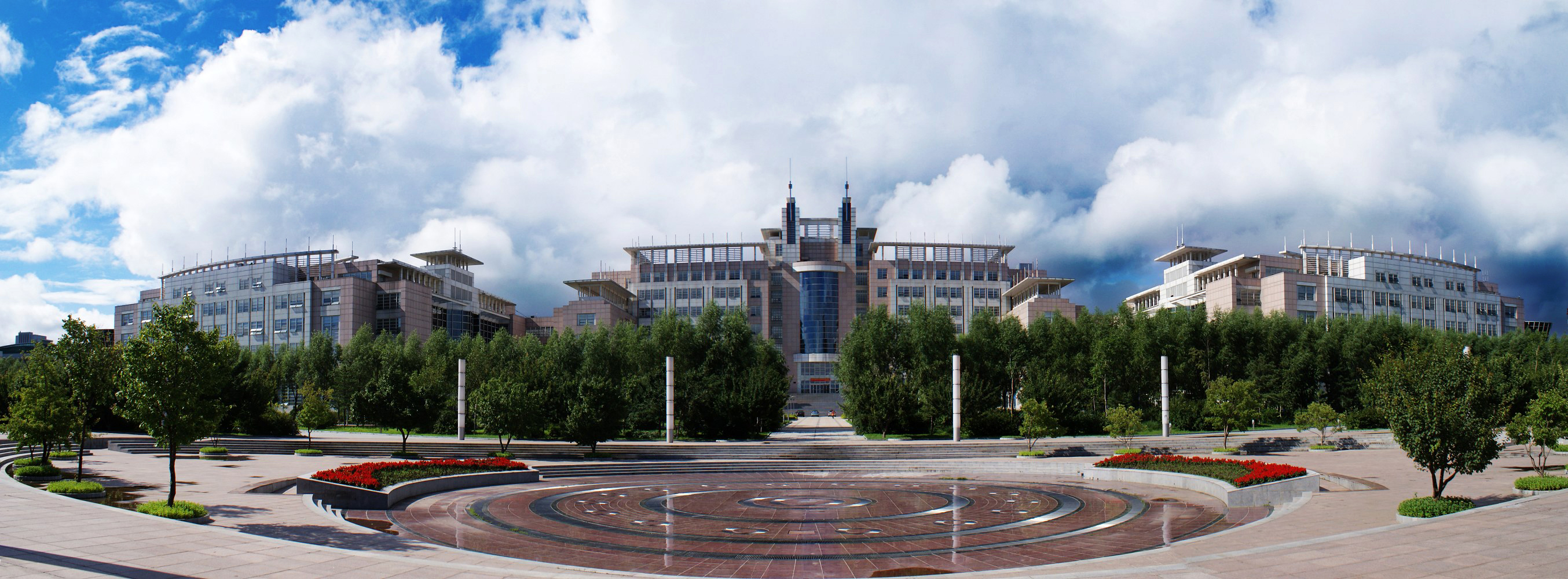
PRC State key laboratory in Jilin University

Changchun is ranked one of the top 30 cities in the world by scientific research as tracked by the Nature Index according to the Nature Index 2024 Science Cities. The city has 27 regular institutions of full-time tertiary education with a total enrollment of approximate 160,000 students. Jilin University and Northeast Normal University are two key universities in China. Jilin University is also one of the largest universities in China, with more than 60,000 students.

- Changchun Normal University
- Changchun University
- Changchun University of Science and Technology
- Changchun University of Chinese Medicine
- Jilin College of the Arts
- Jilin Huaqiao Foreign Languages Institute, a private college offering bachelor study programs in foreign languages, international trade management and didactics
- Jilin University
- Jilin University of Finance and Economics
- Jilin Agricultural University
- Northeast Normal University
- Jilin Engineering Normal University
- Changchun Institute of Technology

=== Middle schools ===
- High School Attached to Northeast Normal University
- Affiliated Middle School to Jilin University
- No.72 Middle School of Changchun
- Second experimental school of Jilin Province
- No.11 High School of Changchun
- Changchun No.6 middle school
- Changchun Foreign Languages School

=== Primary and secondary schools ===
International schools include:

- Changchun American International School
- Deutsche Internationale Schule Changchun
- St John's College Changchun
- Changchun Experimental High School International Department

== Sports and stadiums ==
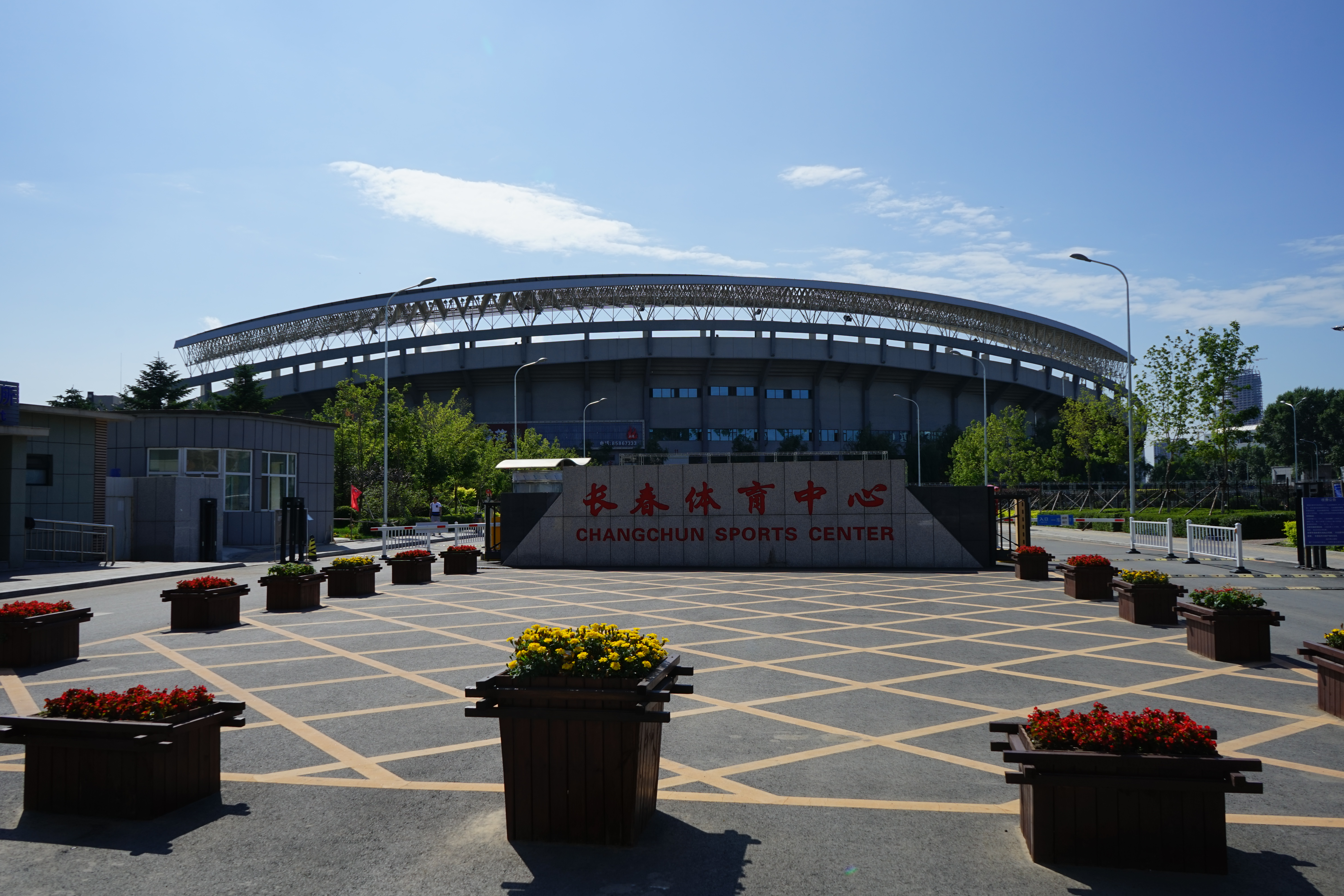
Changchun Sports Centre

As a major Chinese city, Changchun is home to many professional sports teams:

- Jilin Northeast Tigers (Basketball), is a competitive team which has long been one of the major clubs fighting in China top-level league, CBA.
- Changchun Yatai, who have played home soccer matches at the Development Area Stadium since 2009. In 2007 they won the Chinese Super League.

There are two major multi-purpose stadiums in Changchun, including Changchun City Stadium and Development Area Stadium.

- Changchun Wuhuan Gymnasium, the main venue of the 2007 Asian Winter Games.
- It has an indoor speed skating arena, Jilin Provincial Speed Skating Rink, as one of five in China.

Jinlin Tseng Tou are a professional ice hockey team based in the city, and compete in the Russian-based Supreme Hockey League. They are one of two Chinese-based teams to enter the league during the 2017–18 season, the other being based in Harbin.

== Film ==
- Changchun Film Group Corporation
- Changchun Film Festival
- The Farewell was filmed in the city.

== Notable people ==
- Ei-ichi Negishi (根岸 英一), 2010 Nobel Prize winner in chemistry, was born in Changchun
- Liu Xiaobo (刘晓波), 2010 Nobel Peace Prize winner, was born in Changchun
- Cheng Yonghua (born 1954), diplomat who served as Ambassador to Japan from 2010 to 2019.
- Da Pang (dog), a dog

== Twin towns and sister cities ==
Changchun's twin towns and sister cities are:

- Birmingham, West Midlands, United Kingdom
- Chongjin, North Hamgyong, North Korea
- Hjørring, North Jutland, Denmark
- Krasnoyarsk, Russia
- Little Rock, Arkansas, United States
- Masterton, Wellington Region, New Zealand
- Minsk, Belarus
- Montreuil, Île-de-France, France
- Mora, Dalarna, Sweden
- Novi Sad, Vojvodina, Serbia
- Plovdiv, Bulgaria
- Prachinburi, Thailand
- Sendai, Miyagi, Japan
- Tijuana, Baja California, Mexico
- Ulan-Ude, Buryatia, Russia
- Ulsan, Yeongnam, South Korea
- Warrnambool, Victoria, Australia
- Windsor, Ontario, Canada
- Wolfsburg, Lower Saxony, Germany
- Žilina, Slovakia

== See also ==
- List of twin towns and sister cities in China
- Changchun smog
- Changchun Confucius Temple
- Category:People from Changchun
- Chinese ship Changchun

== Bibliography ==
- Changchun (China) in the Encyclopædia Britannica Online
