= Chinese destroyer Changchun =

Multiple ships of the Chinese Navy have been named after Changchun, the capital of Jilin province.

- Chinese destroyer Changchun (103), a Gnevny-class destroyer sold to China
- Chinese destroyer Changchun (150), a Type 052C destroyer
