= Changchun Temple =

Buddhist temple in Beijing, China

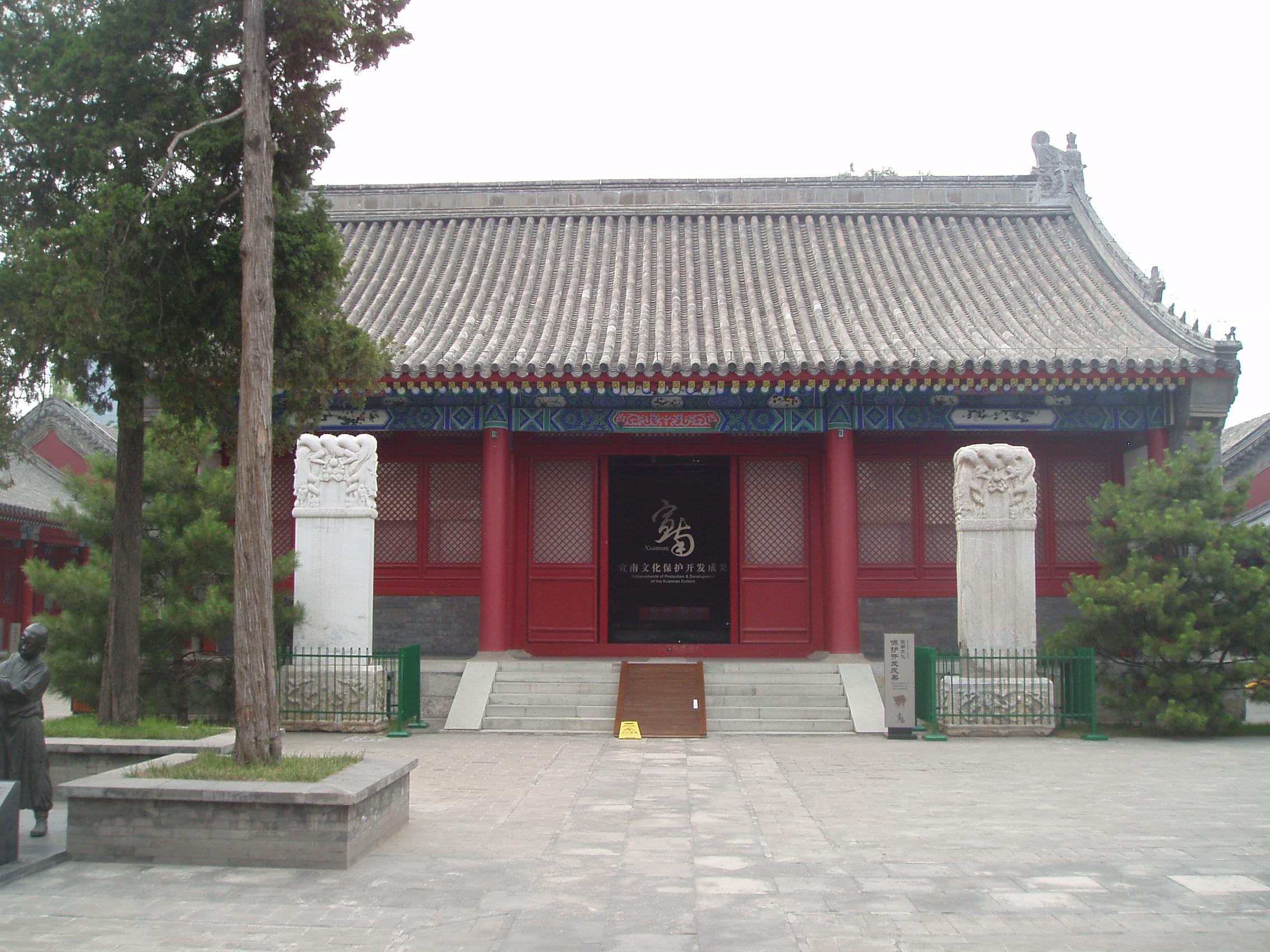
- The temple's middle hall

Religion
- Affiliation: Buddhism

Location
- Location: Beijing
- Country: China
- Interactive map of Changchun Temple
- Coordinates: 39°53′29″N 116°21′29″E

The Beijing Changchun Temple (Chinese: 北京长椿寺; pinyin: Beijing Changchun Si) is a Buddhist temple in Xuanwu District, Beijing, China. The temple also houses the Xuanwu Cultural Museum.

== History ==
The temple was first built by the Wanli Emperor's mother in 1592 during the Ming dynasty. The temple was heavily damaged by the 1679 Sanhe-Pinggu earthquake, and was never really restored to its former glory, and later became a storage space for coffins. Following the establishment of the People's Republic of China in 1949, the temple was transformed into housing. In 2001, the temple was put under cultural protection and went through an extensive renovation costing nearly 200 million RMB. In 2005 the temple reopened as the Xuanwu Cultural Museum.

== Layout ==
The temple is organized around one main courtyard which contains three halls. Adjoining the temple is the Xuanwu Municipal Bureau of Tourism.

== Location ==
The temple is located at 9 Changchun Jie in Xuanwu District, Beijing.
