= Nongan =

Nongan or Nong'an may refer to:

- Nong'an County, Jilin, China
- Nong'an Town, seat of Nong'an County
- Nongan (kenong), contents of kenong, an instrument used in the Indonesian gamelan
