= List of minor planets: 616001–617000 =

The following is a partial list of minor planets, running from minor-planet number 616001 through 617000, inclusive. The primary data for this and other partial lists is based on JPL's "Small-Body Orbital Elements" and data available from the Minor Planet Center. Critical list information is also provided by the MPC, unless otherwise specified from Lowell Observatory. A detailed description of the table's columns and additional sources are given on the main page including a complete list of every page in this series, and a statistical break-up on the dynamical classification of minor planets.

Also see the summary list of all named bodies in numerical and alphabetical order, and the corresponding naming citations for the number range of this particular list. New namings may only be added to this list after official publication, as the preannouncement of names is condemned by the Working Group for Small Bodies Nomenclature of the International Astronomical Union.

Near-Earth obj.	MBA (inner)	MBA (outer)	Centaur
Mars-crosser	MBA (middle)	Jupiter trojan	Trans-Neptunian obj.
Unclassified

== 616001–616100 ==
Designation			Discovery			Properties		Ref
Permanent	Provisional	Named after	Date	Site	Discoverer(s)	Category	Diam.	Ref
616001	2005 BX_{18}	—	January 16, 2005	Kitt Peak	Spacewatch	EOS	2.2 km	MPC · JPL
616002	2005 BK_{52}	—	May 14, 2015	Haleakala	Pan-STARRS 1	(194)	1.1 km	MPC · JPL
616003	2005 BX_{53}	—	October 10, 2008	Mount Lemmon	Mount Lemmon Survey	·	2.1 km	MPC · JPL
616004	2005 BA_{54}	—	November 26, 2014	Haleakala	Pan-STARRS 1	TEL	1.1 km	MPC · JPL
616005	2005 BU_{56}	—	January 18, 2005	Kitt Peak	Spacewatch	L5	7.8 km	MPC · JPL
616006	2005 CM_{14}	—	February 2, 2005	Kitt Peak	Spacewatch	(5)	990 m	MPC · JPL
616007	2005 CL_{31}	—	December 20, 2004	Mount Lemmon	Mount Lemmon Survey	·	1 km	MPC · JPL
616008	2005 CU_{44}	—	February 2, 2005	Kitt Peak	Spacewatch	·	910 m	MPC · JPL
616009	2005 CP_{46}	—	February 2, 2005	Kitt Peak	Spacewatch	(5)	940 m	MPC · JPL
616010	2005 CC_{70}	—	February 8, 2005	Mauna Kea	Veillet, C.	EOS	1.7 km	MPC · JPL
616011	2005 CJ_{71}	—	February 1, 2005	Kitt Peak	Spacewatch	·	2.3 km	MPC · JPL
616012	2005 CE_{82}	—	January 15, 2010	Kitt Peak	Spacewatch	·	3.4 km	MPC · JPL
616013	2005 CO_{82}	—	February 24, 2006	Kitt Peak	Spacewatch	3:2 · SHU	5.6 km	MPC · JPL
616014	2005 CB_{83}	—	February 15, 2005	La Silla	A. Boattini	HNS	1.0 km	MPC · JPL
616015	2005 CR_{87}	—	September 1, 2013	Haleakala	Pan-STARRS 1	EOS	1.4 km	MPC · JPL
616016	2005 CU_{87}	—	February 3, 2016	Haleakala	Pan-STARRS 1	·	2.6 km	MPC · JPL
616017	2005 CX_{87}	—	January 7, 2017	Mount Lemmon	Mount Lemmon Survey	·	980 m	MPC · JPL
616018	2005 CZ_{87}	—	February 9, 2005	Mount Lemmon	Mount Lemmon Survey	·	2.5 km	MPC · JPL
616019	2005 CS_{88}	—	February 2, 2005	Kitt Peak	Spacewatch	·	930 m	MPC · JPL
616020	2005 DJ_{3}	—	February 18, 2005	La Silla	A. Boattini	·	2.7 km	MPC · JPL
616021	2005 ET_{43}	—	March 3, 2005	Kitt Peak	Spacewatch	·	2.3 km	MPC · JPL
616022	2005 EA_{64}	—	March 4, 2005	Mount Lemmon	Mount Lemmon Survey	MAR	730 m	MPC · JPL
616023	2005 EC_{106}	—	March 4, 2005	Mount Lemmon	Mount Lemmon Survey	THM	1.7 km	MPC · JPL
616024	2005 EY_{134}	—	February 16, 2005	La Silla	A. Boattini	·	510 m	MPC · JPL
616025	2005 EQ_{140}	—	November 17, 1995	Kitt Peak	Spacewatch	·	1.3 km	MPC · JPL
616026	2005 EC_{144}	—	March 10, 2005	Mount Lemmon	Mount Lemmon Survey	·	2.2 km	MPC · JPL
616027	2005 ET_{145}	—	March 10, 2005	Mount Lemmon	Mount Lemmon Survey	·	2.5 km	MPC · JPL
616028	2005 ET_{155}	—	March 8, 2005	Mount Lemmon	Mount Lemmon Survey	MAR	750 m	MPC · JPL
616029	2005 EJ_{193}	—	March 11, 2005	Mount Lemmon	Mount Lemmon Survey	·	990 m	MPC · JPL
616030	2005 EA_{196}	—	March 11, 2005	Mount Lemmon	Mount Lemmon Survey	KON	1.8 km	MPC · JPL
616031	2005 EO_{228}	—	January 19, 2005	Kitt Peak	Spacewatch	·	2.7 km	MPC · JPL
616032	2005 EZ_{246}	—	March 12, 2005	Kitt Peak	Spacewatch	·	2.6 km	MPC · JPL
616033	2005 EJ_{254}	—	March 11, 2005	Mount Lemmon	Mount Lemmon Survey	·	640 m	MPC · JPL
616034	2005 EC_{257}	—	March 11, 2005	Mount Lemmon	Mount Lemmon Survey	·	2.3 km	MPC · JPL
616035	2005 EF_{257}	—	March 11, 2005	Mount Lemmon	Mount Lemmon Survey	·	2.8 km	MPC · JPL
616036	2005 EE_{267}	—	March 13, 2005	Kitt Peak	Spacewatch	·	850 m	MPC · JPL
616037	2005 EN_{300}	—	March 11, 2005	Kitt Peak	Deep Ecliptic Survey	·	910 m	MPC · JPL
616038	2005 EC_{306}	—	March 4, 2005	Mount Lemmon	Mount Lemmon Survey	·	2.2 km	MPC · JPL
616039	2005 EU_{306}	—	March 8, 2005	Mount Lemmon	Mount Lemmon Survey	EUN	1.2 km	MPC · JPL
616040	2005 EX_{310}	—	March 10, 2005	Mount Lemmon	Mount Lemmon Survey	·	2.4 km	MPC · JPL
616041	2005 EX_{313}	—	May 4, 2002	Kitt Peak	Spacewatch	·	500 m	MPC · JPL
616042	2005 EK_{327}	—	February 24, 2015	Haleakala	Pan-STARRS 1	·	560 m	MPC · JPL
616043	2005 EE_{335}	—	November 13, 2007	Mount Lemmon	Mount Lemmon Survey	·	630 m	MPC · JPL
616044	2005 EG_{335}	—	March 3, 2005	Kitt Peak	Spacewatch	·	2.4 km	MPC · JPL
616045	2005 EG_{340}	—	September 11, 2007	Mount Lemmon	Mount Lemmon Survey	·	2.5 km	MPC · JPL
616046	2005 EJ_{340}	—	September 2, 2013	Mount Lemmon	Mount Lemmon Survey	·	2.7 km	MPC · JPL
616047	2005 EK_{341}	—	October 3, 2013	Haleakala	Pan-STARRS 1	·	2.1 km	MPC · JPL
616048	2005 EJ_{342}	—	August 26, 1998	Kitt Peak	Spacewatch	·	1.1 km	MPC · JPL
616049	2005 EO_{343}	—	September 12, 2007	Mount Lemmon	Mount Lemmon Survey	·	1.8 km	MPC · JPL
616050	2005 EX_{343}	—	December 11, 2014	Mount Lemmon	Mount Lemmon Survey	·	2.6 km	MPC · JPL
616051	2005 EY_{344}	—	May 23, 2014	Mount Lemmon	Mount Lemmon Survey	·	980 m	MPC · JPL
616052	2005 EX_{345}	—	October 3, 2015	Mount Lemmon	Mount Lemmon Survey	·	1.0 km	MPC · JPL
616053	2005 FG_{17}	—	March 17, 2005	Kitt Peak	Spacewatch	H	340 m	MPC · JPL
616054	2005 FU_{17}	—	April 6, 2011	Mount Lemmon	Mount Lemmon Survey	·	2.3 km	MPC · JPL
616055	2005 FG_{18}	—	February 5, 2016	Haleakala	Pan-STARRS 1	·	2.5 km	MPC · JPL
616056	2005 GT_{18}	—	March 9, 2005	Mount Lemmon	Mount Lemmon Survey	·	2.2 km	MPC · JPL
616057	2005 GD_{46}	—	April 5, 2005	Mount Lemmon	Mount Lemmon Survey	TIR	3.4 km	MPC · JPL
616058	2005 GD_{57}	—	November 29, 2003	Kitt Peak	Spacewatch	·	680 m	MPC · JPL
616059	2005 GR_{80}	—	March 14, 2005	Mount Lemmon	Mount Lemmon Survey	·	710 m	MPC · JPL
616060	2005 GG_{82}	—	February 2, 2005	Kitt Peak	Spacewatch	·	2.7 km	MPC · JPL
616061	2005 GY_{100}	—	April 9, 2005	Mount Lemmon	Mount Lemmon Survey	MAR	1.0 km	MPC · JPL
616062	2005 GS_{114}	—	April 10, 2005	Mount Lemmon	Mount Lemmon Survey	·	1.2 km	MPC · JPL
616063	2005 GZ_{122}	—	April 6, 2005	Mount Lemmon	Mount Lemmon Survey	·	2.6 km	MPC · JPL
616064	2005 GX_{123}	—	April 9, 2005	Kitt Peak	Spacewatch	·	630 m	MPC · JPL
616065	2005 GF_{134}	—	April 10, 2005	Kitt Peak	Spacewatch	(1547)	1.1 km	MPC · JPL
616066	2005 GH_{142}	—	April 10, 2005	Kitt Peak	Spacewatch	·	2.5 km	MPC · JPL
616067	2005 GO_{152}	—	April 12, 2005	Anderson Mesa	LONEOS	(5)	1.5 km	MPC · JPL
616068	2005 GB_{168}	—	April 11, 2005	Kitt Peak	Spacewatch	·	1.3 km	MPC · JPL
616069	2005 GY_{177}	—	April 5, 2005	Mount Lemmon	Mount Lemmon Survey	·	1.2 km	MPC · JPL
616070	2005 GF_{197}	—	April 10, 2005	Kitt Peak	Deep Ecliptic Survey	THM	2.3 km	MPC · JPL
616071	2005 GS_{200}	—	March 4, 2005	Mount Lemmon	Mount Lemmon Survey	·	1.3 km	MPC · JPL
616072	2005 GG_{202}	—	April 5, 2005	Mount Lemmon	Mount Lemmon Survey	·	540 m	MPC · JPL
616073	2005 GV_{219}	—	March 10, 2005	Mount Lemmon	Mount Lemmon Survey	THM	1.7 km	MPC · JPL
616074	2005 GP_{230}	—	April 11, 2005	Mount Lemmon	Mount Lemmon Survey	·	1.1 km	MPC · JPL
616075	2005 GY_{230}	—	April 4, 2005	Mount Lemmon	Mount Lemmon Survey	·	620 m	MPC · JPL
616076	2005 GD_{231}	—	May 25, 2015	Haleakala	Pan-STARRS 1	·	740 m	MPC · JPL
616077	2005 GS_{231}	—	October 3, 2013	Haleakala	Pan-STARRS 1	VER	2.3 km	MPC · JPL
616078	2005 GY_{233}	—	September 13, 2007	Mount Lemmon	Mount Lemmon Survey	·	2.5 km	MPC · JPL
616079	2005 GX_{234}	—	November 21, 2014	Haleakala	Pan-STARRS 1	·	2.3 km	MPC · JPL
616080	2005 GB_{235}	—	April 12, 2005	Mount Lemmon	Mount Lemmon Survey	·	1.3 km	MPC · JPL
616081	2005 GK_{236}	—	November 4, 2007	Kitt Peak	Spacewatch	·	1.3 km	MPC · JPL
616082	2005 GQ_{236}	—	August 21, 2015	Haleakala	Pan-STARRS 1	·	1.0 km	MPC · JPL
616083	2005 GJ_{237}	—	October 24, 2011	Haleakala	Pan-STARRS 1	·	1.2 km	MPC · JPL
616084	2005 GO_{237}	—	September 28, 2011	Mount Lemmon	Mount Lemmon Survey	KRM	1.4 km	MPC · JPL
616085	2005 GQ_{237}	—	May 7, 2014	Haleakala	Pan-STARRS 1	·	1.1 km	MPC · JPL
616086	2005 GH_{238}	—	February 14, 2017	Haleakala	Pan-STARRS 1	·	1.2 km	MPC · JPL
616087	2005 HJ_{11}	—	March 5, 2013	Kitt Peak	Spacewatch	·	770 m	MPC · JPL
616088	2005 HU_{11}	—	February 20, 2018	Haleakala	Pan-STARRS 1	AGN	940 m	MPC · JPL
616089	2005 JS_{6}	—	April 2, 2005	Mount Lemmon	Mount Lemmon Survey	·	3.3 km	MPC · JPL
616090	2005 JW_{7}	—	October 23, 2001	Socorro	LINEAR	·	2.9 km	MPC · JPL
616091	2005 JB_{12}	—	April 11, 2005	Mount Lemmon	Mount Lemmon Survey	·	700 m	MPC · JPL
616092	2005 JE_{18}	—	May 4, 2005	Mount Lemmon	Mount Lemmon Survey	·	1.1 km	MPC · JPL
616093	2005 JJ_{18}	—	May 4, 2005	Mount Lemmon	Mount Lemmon Survey	·	1.3 km	MPC · JPL
616094	2005 JQ_{37}	—	March 17, 2005	Kitt Peak	Spacewatch	·	2.4 km	MPC · JPL
616095	2005 JA_{40}	—	May 7, 2005	Mount Lemmon	Mount Lemmon Survey	·	1.5 km	MPC · JPL
616096	2005 JU_{51}	—	April 7, 2005	Kitt Peak	Spacewatch	·	1.4 km	MPC · JPL
616097	2005 JP_{52}	—	April 16, 2005	Kitt Peak	Spacewatch	·	830 m	MPC · JPL
616098	2005 JN_{62}	—	May 9, 2005	Mount Lemmon	Mount Lemmon Survey	·	1.2 km	MPC · JPL
616099	2005 JE_{70}	—	May 7, 2005	Kitt Peak	Spacewatch	·	1.2 km	MPC · JPL
616100	2005 JF_{72}	—	May 8, 2005	Kitt Peak	Spacewatch	·	2.7 km	MPC · JPL

== 616101–616200 ==
back to top

Designation			Discovery			Properties		Ref
Permanent	Provisional	Named after	Date	Site	Discoverer(s)	Category	Diam.	Ref
616101	2005 JQ_{78}	—	May 10, 2005	Mount Lemmon	Mount Lemmon Survey	·	1.2 km	MPC · JPL
616102	2005 JG_{104}	—	May 10, 2005	Mount Lemmon	Mount Lemmon Survey	·	3.1 km	MPC · JPL
616103	2005 JZ_{108}	—	May 6, 2005	Kitt Peak	D. E. Trilling, A. S. Rivkin	HNS	1.5 km	MPC · JPL
616104	2005 JX_{128}	—	May 13, 2005	Kitt Peak	Spacewatch	·	3.0 km	MPC · JPL
616105	2005 JB_{130}	—	May 13, 2005	Kitt Peak	Spacewatch	·	2.3 km	MPC · JPL
616106	2005 JY_{143}	—	May 15, 2005	Mount Lemmon	Mount Lemmon Survey	·	640 m	MPC · JPL
616107	2005 JD_{149}	—	April 16, 2005	Kitt Peak	Spacewatch	·	620 m	MPC · JPL
616108	2005 JZ_{151}	—	April 9, 2005	Mount Lemmon	Mount Lemmon Survey	·	2.9 km	MPC · JPL
616109	2005 JB_{159}	—	April 4, 2005	Catalina	CSS	·	3.0 km	MPC · JPL
616110	2005 JO_{163}	—	May 9, 2005	Kitt Peak	Spacewatch	·	1.3 km	MPC · JPL
616111	2005 JH_{186}	—	September 14, 2006	Palomar	NEAT	·	2.0 km	MPC · JPL
616112	2005 JD_{188}	—	June 24, 2014	Haleakala	Pan-STARRS 1	·	1.5 km	MPC · JPL
616113	2005 JJ_{188}	—	March 11, 2008	Mount Lemmon	Mount Lemmon Survey	·	600 m	MPC · JPL
616114	2005 JN_{189}	—	May 3, 2005	Kitt Peak	Spacewatch	H	390 m	MPC · JPL
616115	2005 JH_{190}	—	January 18, 2009	Kitt Peak	Spacewatch	·	1.6 km	MPC · JPL
616116	2005 JN_{190}	—	November 21, 2014	Haleakala	Pan-STARRS 1	·	3.3 km	MPC · JPL
616117	2005 JP_{190}	—	July 19, 2001	Palomar	NEAT	·	1.1 km	MPC · JPL
616118	2005 JR_{190}	—	May 12, 2005	Bergisch Gladbach	W. Bickel	·	3.5 km	MPC · JPL
616119	2005 JC_{191}	—	November 4, 2007	Mount Lemmon	Mount Lemmon Survey	TEL	1.2 km	MPC · JPL
616120	2005 JX_{191}	—	October 16, 2007	Kitt Peak	Spacewatch	·	3.2 km	MPC · JPL
616121	2005 JC_{193}	—	November 7, 2007	Kitt Peak	Spacewatch	·	1.2 km	MPC · JPL
616122	2005 JN_{193}	—	April 3, 2016	Haleakala	Pan-STARRS 1	·	2.4 km	MPC · JPL
616123	2005 JZ_{193}	—	May 10, 2005	Mount Lemmon	Mount Lemmon Survey	·	3.1 km	MPC · JPL
616124	2005 JA_{194}	—	November 9, 2013	Kitt Peak	Spacewatch	·	2.9 km	MPC · JPL
616125	2005 JX_{194}	—	May 13, 2005	Mount Lemmon	Mount Lemmon Survey	·	690 m	MPC · JPL
616126	2005 KM_{14}	—	May 19, 2005	Mount Lemmon	Mount Lemmon Survey	·	1.2 km	MPC · JPL
616127	2005 KJ_{15}	—	February 25, 2012	Mount Lemmon	Mount Lemmon Survey	·	910 m	MPC · JPL
616128	2005 KO_{15}	—	May 19, 2005	Mount Lemmon	Mount Lemmon Survey	·	530 m	MPC · JPL
616129	2005 KV_{15}	—	April 14, 1994	Kitt Peak	Spacewatch	NYS	1.0 km	MPC · JPL
616130	2005 KX_{15}	—	January 15, 2013	ESA OGS	ESA OGS	·	1.5 km	MPC · JPL
616131	2005 LC_{2}	—	June 1, 2005	Kitt Peak	Spacewatch	·	1.8 km	MPC · JPL
616132	2005 LG_{4}	—	May 20, 2005	Mount Lemmon	Mount Lemmon Survey	·	510 m	MPC · JPL
616133	2005 LW_{24}	—	May 19, 2005	Mount Lemmon	Mount Lemmon Survey	·	1.4 km	MPC · JPL
616134	2005 LP_{44}	—	May 15, 2005	Mount Lemmon	Mount Lemmon Survey	·	1.4 km	MPC · JPL
616135	2005 LS_{51}	—	June 14, 2005	Kitt Peak	Spacewatch	·	3.7 km	MPC · JPL
616136	2005 LV_{57}	—	June 13, 2005	Mount Lemmon	Mount Lemmon Survey	·	500 m	MPC · JPL
616137	2005 LB_{58}	—	October 19, 2015	Haleakala	Pan-STARRS 1	·	1.3 km	MPC · JPL
616138	2005 MB_{1}	—	June 17, 2005	Mount Lemmon	Mount Lemmon Survey	·	740 m	MPC · JPL
616139	2005 MF_{6}	—	June 24, 2005	Palomar	NEAT	ADE	2.1 km	MPC · JPL
616140	2005 MZ_{6}	—	September 12, 2002	Palomar	NEAT	·	730 m	MPC · JPL
616141	2005 MC_{12}	—	June 28, 2005	Palomar	NEAT	·	620 m	MPC · JPL
616142	2005 MD_{23}	—	June 29, 2005	Kitt Peak	Spacewatch	·	740 m	MPC · JPL
616143	2005 MU_{28}	—	June 29, 2005	Kitt Peak	Spacewatch	·	1.6 km	MPC · JPL
616144	2005 MP_{31}	—	June 24, 1995	Kitt Peak	Spacewatch	·	660 m	MPC · JPL
616145	2005 MD_{45}	—	June 13, 2005	Kitt Peak	Spacewatch	JUN	970 m	MPC · JPL
616146	2005 MH_{55}	—	November 24, 2011	Mount Lemmon	Mount Lemmon Survey	EUN	1.2 km	MPC · JPL
616147	2005 NG_{1}	—	July 1, 2005	Palomar	NEAT	·	1.8 km	MPC · JPL
616148	2005 NZ_{13}	—	July 5, 2005	Kitt Peak	Spacewatch	·	570 m	MPC · JPL
616149	2005 NC_{14}	—	July 5, 2005	Kitt Peak	Spacewatch	·	1.8 km	MPC · JPL
616150	2005 NV_{20}	—	July 5, 2005	Siding Spring	SSS	·	700 m	MPC · JPL
616151	2005 NM_{38}	—	July 6, 2005	Kitt Peak	Spacewatch	·	630 m	MPC · JPL
616152	2005 NQ_{42}	—	July 5, 2005	Kitt Peak	Spacewatch	·	1.8 km	MPC · JPL
616153	2005 NA_{67}	—	July 2, 2005	Kitt Peak	Spacewatch	·	640 m	MPC · JPL
616154	2005 ND_{76}	—	July 10, 2005	Kitt Peak	Spacewatch	·	850 m	MPC · JPL
616155	2005 NR_{76}	—	June 21, 2005	Palomar	NEAT	·	750 m	MPC · JPL
616156	2005 NB_{100}	—	June 17, 2005	Mount Lemmon	Mount Lemmon Survey	·	490 m	MPC · JPL
616157	2005 NP_{105}	—	June 13, 2005	Mount Lemmon	Mount Lemmon Survey	·	1.3 km	MPC · JPL
616158	2005 NE_{108}	—	June 17, 2005	Mount Lemmon	Mount Lemmon Survey	·	1.0 km	MPC · JPL
616159	2005 NO_{116}	—	July 7, 2005	Mauna Kea	Veillet, C.	·	1.4 km	MPC · JPL
616160	2005 NC_{118}	—	July 7, 2005	Mauna Kea	Veillet, C.	·	800 m	MPC · JPL
616161	2005 NS_{120}	—	July 7, 2005	Mauna Kea	Veillet, C.	·	1.3 km	MPC · JPL
616162	2005 NK_{126}	—	February 9, 2008	Kitt Peak	Spacewatch	·	1.6 km	MPC · JPL
616163	2005 NL_{127}	—	April 6, 2005	Kitt Peak	Spacewatch	·	1.5 km	MPC · JPL
616164	2005 NS_{128}	—	July 11, 2005	Kitt Peak	Spacewatch	·	900 m	MPC · JPL
616165	2005 NX_{129}	—	March 28, 2015	Haleakala	Pan-STARRS 1	V	530 m	MPC · JPL
616166	2005 NE_{133}	—	July 15, 2005	Kitt Peak	Spacewatch	EUN	920 m	MPC · JPL
616167	2005 OF_{2}	—	July 3, 2005	Palomar	NEAT	·	630 m	MPC · JPL
616168	2005 OC_{12}	—	July 29, 2005	Palomar	NEAT	·	1.9 km	MPC · JPL
616169	2005 OW_{16}	—	July 30, 2005	Palomar	NEAT	·	880 m	MPC · JPL
616170	2005 OQ_{19}	—	July 12, 2005	Mount Lemmon	Mount Lemmon Survey	·	1.9 km	MPC · JPL
616171	2005 OY_{30}	—	July 27, 2005	Palomar	NEAT	·	2.9 km	MPC · JPL
616172	2005 OF_{32}	—	July 30, 2005	Palomar	NEAT	·	740 m	MPC · JPL
616173	2005 OW_{32}	—	February 6, 2014	Mount Lemmon	Mount Lemmon Survey	·	920 m	MPC · JPL
616174	2005 OT_{33}	—	August 10, 2016	Haleakala	Pan-STARRS 1	NYS	770 m	MPC · JPL
616175	2005 OD_{34}	—	July 28, 2005	Palomar	NEAT	NYS	690 m	MPC · JPL
616176	2005 OH_{34}	—	July 30, 2005	Palomar	NEAT	·	720 m	MPC · JPL
616177	2005 OX_{34}	—	July 30, 2005	Palomar	NEAT	·	2.8 km	MPC · JPL
616178	2005 OF_{35}	—	July 30, 2005	Palomar	NEAT	T_{j} (2.99)	2.3 km	MPC · JPL
616179	2005 PY_{1}	—	August 1, 2005	Siding Spring	SSS	·	790 m	MPC · JPL
616180	2005 PN_{6}	—	August 4, 2005	Palomar	NEAT	PHO	820 m	MPC · JPL
616181	2005 PR_{10}	—	August 4, 2005	Palomar	NEAT	·	1.1 km	MPC · JPL
616182	2005 PC_{13}	—	August 4, 2005	Palomar	NEAT	(2076)	970 m	MPC · JPL
616183	2005 PD_{21}	—	July 31, 2005	Palomar	NEAT	·	700 m	MPC · JPL
616184 Malahat	2005 PK_{26}	Malahat	August 5, 2005	Mauna Kea	P. A. Wiegert, D. D. Balam	·	720 m	MPC · JPL
616185	2005 PP_{30}	—	August 17, 2012	Haleakala	Pan-STARRS 1	·	600 m	MPC · JPL
616186	2005 PM_{31}	—	August 4, 2005	Palomar	NEAT	·	780 m	MPC · JPL
616187	2005 QD_{8}	—	August 24, 2005	Palomar	NEAT	H	570 m	MPC · JPL
616188	2005 QX_{11}	—	August 6, 2005	Palomar	NEAT	·	790 m	MPC · JPL
616189	2005 QN_{16}	—	August 25, 2005	Palomar	NEAT	·	900 m	MPC · JPL
616190	2005 QY_{18}	—	August 25, 2005	Palomar	NEAT	·	1.2 km	MPC · JPL
616191	2005 QE_{20}	—	August 26, 2005	Anderson Mesa	LONEOS	PHO	860 m	MPC · JPL
616192	2005 QW_{21}	—	August 26, 2005	Campo Imperatore	CINEOS	·	1.7 km	MPC · JPL
616193	2005 QB_{30}	—	August 29, 2005	Anderson Mesa	LONEOS	·	1.1 km	MPC · JPL
616194	2005 QP_{45}	—	August 28, 2005	Kitt Peak	Spacewatch	·	2.0 km	MPC · JPL
616195	2005 QX_{47}	—	July 31, 2005	Palomar	NEAT	·	850 m	MPC · JPL
616196	2005 QA_{50}	—	August 27, 2005	Anderson Mesa	LONEOS	·	720 m	MPC · JPL
616197	2005 QB_{51}	—	August 27, 2005	Anderson Mesa	LONEOS	·	930 m	MPC · JPL
616198	2005 QF_{53}	—	August 6, 2005	Palomar	NEAT	·	1.5 km	MPC · JPL
616199	2005 QU_{58}	—	August 25, 2005	Palomar	NEAT	V	700 m	MPC · JPL
616200	2005 QL_{63}	—	August 26, 2005	Palomar	NEAT	·	930 m	MPC · JPL

== 616201–616300 ==
back to top

Designation			Discovery			Properties		Ref
Permanent	Provisional	Named after	Date	Site	Discoverer(s)	Category	Diam.	Ref
616201	2005 QF_{64}	—	August 26, 2005	Palomar	NEAT	·	850 m	MPC · JPL
616202	2005 QP_{69}	—	July 29, 2005	Palomar	NEAT	·	2.1 km	MPC · JPL
616203	2005 QR_{71}	—	August 26, 2005	Anderson Mesa	LONEOS	·	1.1 km	MPC · JPL
616204	2005 QD_{73}	—	August 29, 2005	Kitt Peak	Spacewatch	·	2.3 km	MPC · JPL
616205	2005 QR_{75}	—	August 29, 2005	Anderson Mesa	LONEOS	PHO	750 m	MPC · JPL
616206	2005 QQ_{78}	—	August 25, 2005	Palomar	NEAT	·	1.3 km	MPC · JPL
616207	2005 QZ_{78}	—	August 25, 2005	Palomar	NEAT	·	1.1 km	MPC · JPL
616208	2005 QG_{90}	—	August 25, 2005	Palomar	NEAT	·	940 m	MPC · JPL
616209	2005 QF_{95}	—	August 5, 2005	Palomar	NEAT	·	720 m	MPC · JPL
616210	2005 QJ_{95}	—	August 6, 2005	Palomar	NEAT	·	1.8 km	MPC · JPL
616211	2005 QE_{98}	—	August 31, 2005	Kitt Peak	Spacewatch	·	1.6 km	MPC · JPL
616212	2005 QL_{99}	—	July 31, 2005	Palomar	NEAT	·	1.5 km	MPC · JPL
616213	2005 QA_{108}	—	August 30, 2005	Kitt Peak	Spacewatch	·	720 m	MPC · JPL
616214	2005 QJ_{108}	—	August 30, 2005	Kitt Peak	Spacewatch	·	640 m	MPC · JPL
616215	2005 QM_{112}	—	August 31, 2005	Kitt Peak	Spacewatch	·	790 m	MPC · JPL
616216	2005 QN_{131}	—	August 28, 2005	Kitt Peak	Spacewatch	·	1.6 km	MPC · JPL
616217	2005 QS_{131}	—	August 28, 2005	Kitt Peak	Spacewatch	·	550 m	MPC · JPL
616218	2005 QE_{133}	—	August 28, 2005	Kitt Peak	Spacewatch	V	470 m	MPC · JPL
616219	2005 QF_{133}	—	August 28, 2005	Kitt Peak	Spacewatch	·	870 m	MPC · JPL
616220	2005 QF_{139}	—	August 28, 2005	Kitt Peak	Spacewatch	·	940 m	MPC · JPL
616221	2005 QA_{146}	—	August 28, 2005	CAO, San Pedro de	CAO, San Pedro de	·	1.2 km	MPC · JPL
616222	2005 QO_{147}	—	August 28, 2005	Siding Spring	SSS	·	2.0 km	MPC · JPL
616223	2005 QL_{160}	—	August 28, 2005	Kitt Peak	Spacewatch	NYS	850 m	MPC · JPL
616224	2005 QR_{162}	—	August 30, 2005	Palomar	NEAT	·	640 m	MPC · JPL
616225	2005 QY_{162}	—	January 1, 2003	Kitt Peak	Spacewatch	·	1.3 km	MPC · JPL
616226	2005 QZ_{162}	—	August 5, 2005	Palomar	NEAT	·	1.5 km	MPC · JPL
616227	2005 QT_{172}	—	August 31, 2005	Kitt Peak	Spacewatch	(5)	1.1 km	MPC · JPL
616228	2005 QT_{173}	—	August 31, 2005	Kitt Peak	Spacewatch	·	860 m	MPC · JPL
616229	2005 QR_{175}	—	August 31, 2005	Palomar	NEAT	·	1.7 km	MPC · JPL
616230	2005 QU_{175}	—	August 31, 2005	Kitt Peak	Spacewatch	·	510 m	MPC · JPL
616231	2005 QT_{180}	—	August 29, 2005	Anderson Mesa	LONEOS	·	2.1 km	MPC · JPL
616232	2005 QS_{185}	—	February 10, 1999	Kitt Peak	Spacewatch	(5)	940 m	MPC · JPL
616233	2005 QE_{186}	—	August 30, 2005	Mauna Kea	P. A. Wiegert	·	2.5 km	MPC · JPL
616234	2005 QZ_{191}	—	May 26, 2015	Haleakala	Pan-STARRS 1	·	3.2 km	MPC · JPL
616235	2005 QM_{192}	—	August 31, 2005	Kitt Peak	Spacewatch	NYS	930 m	MPC · JPL
616236	2005 QT_{193}	—	August 27, 2005	Palomar	NEAT	·	870 m	MPC · JPL
616237	2005 QX_{196}	—	August 27, 2005	Palomar	NEAT	·	590 m	MPC · JPL
616238	2005 QM_{208}	—	August 28, 2005	Kitt Peak	Spacewatch	·	2.2 km	MPC · JPL
616239	2005 RM	—	September 1, 2005	St. Véran	St. Veran	·	580 m	MPC · JPL
616240	2005 RP_{7}	—	August 25, 2005	Palomar	NEAT	·	900 m	MPC · JPL
616241	2005 RN_{9}	—	August 31, 2005	Palomar	NEAT	·	920 m	MPC · JPL
616242	2005 RH_{15}	—	September 1, 2005	Kitt Peak	Spacewatch	·	1.6 km	MPC · JPL
616243	2005 RU_{16}	—	August 26, 2005	Palomar	NEAT	·	1.1 km	MPC · JPL
616244	2005 RH_{17}	—	September 1, 2005	Kitt Peak	Spacewatch	MAS	630 m	MPC · JPL
616245	2005 RY_{20}	—	September 1, 2005	Palomar	NEAT	V	790 m	MPC · JPL
616246	2005 RL_{40}	—	July 31, 2005	Palomar	NEAT	·	730 m	MPC · JPL
616247	2005 RA_{45}	—	September 3, 2005	Palomar	NEAT	·	1.9 km	MPC · JPL
616248	2005 RZ_{46}	—	October 1, 2005	Apache Point	SDSS Collaboration	DOR	1.6 km	MPC · JPL
616249	2005 RO_{53}	—	September 1, 2005	Kitt Peak	Spacewatch	·	1 km	MPC · JPL
616250	2005 RS_{53}	—	January 31, 2012	Mount Lemmon	Mount Lemmon Survey	·	2.0 km	MPC · JPL
616251	2005 RZ_{53}	—	September 14, 2005	Kitt Peak	Spacewatch	·	1.7 km	MPC · JPL
616252	2005 RQ_{54}	—	March 14, 2011	Mount Lemmon	Mount Lemmon Survey	V	570 m	MPC · JPL
616253	2005 RH_{56}	—	September 13, 2005	Kitt Peak	Spacewatch	·	720 m	MPC · JPL
616254	2005 RN_{56}	—	October 11, 2010	Mount Lemmon	Mount Lemmon Survey	·	1.9 km	MPC · JPL
616255	2005 RX_{56}	—	September 12, 2005	Kitt Peak	Spacewatch	·	3.1 km	MPC · JPL
616256	2005 RB_{59}	—	January 18, 2012	Mount Lemmon	Mount Lemmon Survey	HOF	2.2 km	MPC · JPL
616257	2005 RK_{59}	—	August 3, 2014	Haleakala	Pan-STARRS 1	AGN	880 m	MPC · JPL
616258	2005 RT_{61}	—	September 14, 2005	Kitt Peak	Spacewatch	·	2.2 km	MPC · JPL
616259	2005 ST	—	August 31, 2005	Kitt Peak	Spacewatch	·	970 m	MPC · JPL
616260	2005 SA_{6}	—	September 23, 2005	Kitt Peak	Spacewatch	·	880 m	MPC · JPL
616261	2005 SM_{15}	—	September 26, 2005	Kitt Peak	Spacewatch	·	820 m	MPC · JPL
616262	2005 SM_{23}	—	September 23, 2005	Catalina	CSS	·	1.1 km	MPC · JPL
616263	2005 SL_{26}	—	September 22, 2005	Palomar	NEAT	EUP	3.1 km	MPC · JPL
616264	2005 SF_{40}	—	September 24, 2005	Kitt Peak	Spacewatch	·	1.9 km	MPC · JPL
616265	2005 SR_{40}	—	September 24, 2005	Kitt Peak	Spacewatch	·	680 m	MPC · JPL
616266	2005 SC_{42}	—	September 23, 2005	Catalina	CSS	·	2.3 km	MPC · JPL
616267	2005 ST_{44}	—	September 24, 2005	Kitt Peak	Spacewatch	NYS	830 m	MPC · JPL
616268	2005 SM_{56}	—	September 25, 2005	Kitt Peak	Spacewatch	H	530 m	MPC · JPL
616269	2005 SV_{60}	—	September 26, 2005	Kitt Peak	Spacewatch	MAS	570 m	MPC · JPL
616270	2005 SY_{64}	—	August 25, 2005	Palomar	NEAT	·	680 m	MPC · JPL
616271	2005 SZ_{67}	—	September 27, 2005	Kitt Peak	Spacewatch	·	1.5 km	MPC · JPL
616272	2005 SN_{70}	—	August 31, 2005	Palomar	NEAT	·	2.0 km	MPC · JPL
616273	2005 SN_{71}	—	July 4, 2005	Mount Lemmon	Mount Lemmon Survey	·	830 m	MPC · JPL
616274	2005 SC_{72}	—	September 23, 2005	Catalina	CSS	GEF	1.2 km	MPC · JPL
616275	2005 SC_{80}	—	September 23, 2005	Catalina	CSS	·	840 m	MPC · JPL
616276	2005 SY_{84}	—	September 24, 2005	Kitt Peak	Spacewatch	·	1.4 km	MPC · JPL
616277	2005 SA_{92}	—	September 24, 2005	Kitt Peak	Spacewatch	·	1.7 km	MPC · JPL
616278	2005 SE_{96}	—	September 25, 2005	Kitt Peak	Spacewatch	·	1.1 km	MPC · JPL
616279	2005 SH_{96}	—	August 31, 2005	Palomar	NEAT	TIR	2.6 km	MPC · JPL
616280	2005 SD_{100}	—	December 4, 1996	Kitt Peak	Spacewatch	HOF	2.5 km	MPC · JPL
616281	2005 SG_{106}	—	August 29, 2005	Kitt Peak	Spacewatch	·	600 m	MPC · JPL
616282	2005 SN_{108}	—	September 26, 2005	Kitt Peak	Spacewatch	·	1.4 km	MPC · JPL
616283	2005 SR_{110}	—	September 26, 2005	Kitt Peak	Spacewatch	·	1.0 km	MPC · JPL
616284	2005 SN_{112}	—	September 26, 2005	Palomar	NEAT	·	1.2 km	MPC · JPL
616285	2005 SR_{113}	—	September 27, 2005	Kitt Peak	Spacewatch	·	840 m	MPC · JPL
616286	2005 SO_{115}	—	September 27, 2005	Kitt Peak	Spacewatch	NEM	2.0 km	MPC · JPL
616287	2005 SN_{123}	—	September 29, 2005	Anderson Mesa	LONEOS	·	2.0 km	MPC · JPL
616288	2005 SS_{128}	—	September 29, 2005	Mount Lemmon	Mount Lemmon Survey	NYS	880 m	MPC · JPL
616289	2005 SF_{132}	—	August 30, 2005	Palomar	NEAT	·	1.3 km	MPC · JPL
616290	2005 SK_{146}	—	September 25, 2005	Kitt Peak	Spacewatch	·	1.3 km	MPC · JPL
616291	2005 SQ_{163}	—	September 27, 2005	Palomar	NEAT	·	740 m	MPC · JPL
616292	2005 SM_{166}	—	August 31, 2005	Palomar	NEAT	·	690 m	MPC · JPL
616293	2005 SG_{171}	—	September 29, 2005	Kitt Peak	Spacewatch	·	730 m	MPC · JPL
616294	2005 SN_{172}	—	September 29, 2005	Kitt Peak	Spacewatch	·	1.4 km	MPC · JPL
616295	2005 SM_{176}	—	September 29, 2005	Kitt Peak	Spacewatch	·	1.6 km	MPC · JPL
616296	2005 SO_{182}	—	September 29, 2005	Kitt Peak	Spacewatch	·	1.6 km	MPC · JPL
616297	2005 SZ_{186}	—	September 29, 2005	Palomar	NEAT	(32418)	2.8 km	MPC · JPL
616298	2005 SL_{187}	—	August 30, 2005	Palomar	NEAT	·	700 m	MPC · JPL
616299	2005 SW_{188}	—	September 29, 2005	Mount Lemmon	Mount Lemmon Survey	·	790 m	MPC · JPL
616300	2005 SQ_{198}	—	August 27, 2005	Palomar	NEAT	·	1.0 km	MPC · JPL

== 616301–616400 ==
back to top

Designation			Discovery			Properties		Ref
Permanent	Provisional	Named after	Date	Site	Discoverer(s)	Category	Diam.	Ref
616301	2005 SL_{199}	—	September 14, 2005	Kitt Peak	Spacewatch	·	860 m	MPC · JPL
616302	2005 SA_{202}	—	August 31, 2005	Palomar	NEAT	·	940 m	MPC · JPL
616303	2005 SZ_{204}	—	August 31, 2005	Palomar	NEAT	·	1.1 km	MPC · JPL
616304	2005 SV_{234}	—	September 29, 2005	Mount Lemmon	Mount Lemmon Survey	·	800 m	MPC · JPL
616305	2005 SN_{238}	—	September 29, 2005	Kitt Peak	Spacewatch	NYS	770 m	MPC · JPL
616306	2005 SS_{255}	—	August 31, 2005	Kitt Peak	Spacewatch	MAS	490 m	MPC · JPL
616307	2005 SM_{264}	—	September 24, 2005	Kitt Peak	Spacewatch	NYS	860 m	MPC · JPL
616308	2005 SC_{271}	—	September 30, 2005	Anderson Mesa	LONEOS	·	690 m	MPC · JPL
616309	2005 SV_{272}	—	September 30, 2005	Anderson Mesa	LONEOS	·	940 m	MPC · JPL
616310	2005 SW_{275}	—	September 29, 2005	Kitt Peak	Spacewatch	HOF	2.1 km	MPC · JPL
616311	2005 SD_{280}	—	September 25, 2005	Palomar	NEAT	·	1.7 km	MPC · JPL
616312	2005 SS_{284}	—	November 3, 2005	Catalina	CSS	·	2.0 km	MPC · JPL
616313	2005 SY_{284}	—	October 1, 2005	Apache Point	SDSS Collaboration	·	1.8 km	MPC · JPL
616314	2005 SG_{290}	—	September 29, 2005	Mount Lemmon	Mount Lemmon Survey	·	770 m	MPC · JPL
616315	2005 SM_{293}	—	August 27, 2005	Palomar	NEAT	·	2.0 km	MPC · JPL
616316	2005 SL_{295}	—	September 29, 2005	Mount Lemmon	Mount Lemmon Survey	HOF	2.0 km	MPC · JPL
616317	2005 ST_{297}	—	November 11, 2010	Kitt Peak	Spacewatch	·	1.5 km	MPC · JPL
616318	2005 SJ_{298}	—	August 24, 2012	Catalina	CSS	·	650 m	MPC · JPL
616319	2005 SD_{305}	—	September 29, 2005	Kitt Peak	Spacewatch	·	410 m	MPC · JPL
616320	2005 TS_{28}	—	September 1, 2005	Socorro	LINEAR	·	890 m	MPC · JPL
616321	2005 TZ_{32}	—	October 1, 2005	Kitt Peak	Spacewatch	NYS	830 m	MPC · JPL
616322	2005 TX_{39}	—	October 1, 2005	Kitt Peak	Spacewatch	·	740 m	MPC · JPL
616323	2005 TF_{41}	—	October 2, 2005	Mount Lemmon	Mount Lemmon Survey	·	1.3 km	MPC · JPL
616324	2005 TP_{41}	—	August 30, 2005	Anderson Mesa	LONEOS	·	1.9 km	MPC · JPL
616325	2005 TQ_{43}	—	August 29, 2005	Palomar	NEAT	·	1.4 km	MPC · JPL
616326	2005 TS_{43}	—	September 3, 2005	Palomar	NEAT	T_{j} (2.98)	3.6 km	MPC · JPL
616327	2005 TF_{46}	—	August 29, 2005	Palomar	NEAT	·	1.4 km	MPC · JPL
616328	2005 TO_{50}	—	October 10, 2005	Uccle	P. De Cat	·	860 m	MPC · JPL
616329	2005 TX_{68}	—	October 6, 2005	Kitt Peak	Spacewatch	HOF	2.5 km	MPC · JPL
616330	2005 TK_{90}	—	September 1, 2005	Palomar	NEAT	·	3.1 km	MPC · JPL
616331	2005 TQ_{93}	—	October 6, 2005	Kitt Peak	Spacewatch	·	1.1 km	MPC · JPL
616332	2005 TE_{97}	—	October 6, 2005	Mount Lemmon	Mount Lemmon Survey	·	1.0 km	MPC · JPL
616333	2005 TC_{102}	—	October 7, 2005	Mount Lemmon	Mount Lemmon Survey	·	850 m	MPC · JPL
616334	2005 TQ_{102}	—	September 26, 2005	Kitt Peak	Spacewatch	·	730 m	MPC · JPL
616335	2005 TZ_{108}	—	October 7, 2005	Kitt Peak	Spacewatch	HOF	2.3 km	MPC · JPL
616336	2005 TJ_{110}	—	October 7, 2005	Kitt Peak	Spacewatch	HOF	2.4 km	MPC · JPL
616337	2005 TM_{112}	—	September 27, 2005	Kitt Peak	Spacewatch	·	2.5 km	MPC · JPL
616338	2005 TJ_{122}	—	September 30, 2005	Mount Lemmon	Mount Lemmon Survey	·	790 m	MPC · JPL
616339	2005 TL_{128}	—	October 7, 2005	Kitt Peak	Spacewatch	·	1.3 km	MPC · JPL
616340	2005 TA_{129}	—	April 13, 2004	Kitt Peak	Spacewatch	·	930 m	MPC · JPL
616341	2005 TK_{135}	—	August 31, 2005	Palomar	NEAT	·	1.6 km	MPC · JPL
616342	2005 TQ_{135}	—	September 24, 2005	Kitt Peak	Spacewatch	MAS	730 m	MPC · JPL
616343	2005 TW_{148}	—	September 29, 2005	Kitt Peak	Spacewatch	·	1.4 km	MPC · JPL
616344	2005 TD_{158}	—	October 9, 2005	Kitt Peak	Spacewatch	AGN	990 m	MPC · JPL
616345	2005 TC_{163}	—	October 9, 2005	Kitt Peak	Spacewatch	·	1.8 km	MPC · JPL
616346	2005 TH_{180}	—	September 23, 2005	Kitt Peak	Spacewatch	·	1.8 km	MPC · JPL
616347	2005 TW_{184}	—	October 18, 2001	Kitt Peak	Spacewatch	·	1.2 km	MPC · JPL
616348	2005 TP_{185}	—	October 4, 2005	Mount Lemmon	Mount Lemmon Survey	·	990 m	MPC · JPL
616349	2005 TQ_{185}	—	September 23, 2005	Kitt Peak	Spacewatch	MAS	500 m	MPC · JPL
616350	2005 TD_{187}	—	October 5, 2005	Kitt Peak	Spacewatch	MAS	700 m	MPC · JPL
616351	2005 TU_{191}	—	October 2, 2005	Palomar	NEAT	V	680 m	MPC · JPL
616352	2005 TQ_{200}	—	November 27, 2009	Mount Lemmon	Mount Lemmon Survey	·	960 m	MPC · JPL
616353	2005 TM_{201}	—	October 18, 1995	Kitt Peak	Spacewatch	·	1.7 km	MPC · JPL
616354	2005 TE_{202}	—	October 11, 2005	Kitt Peak	Spacewatch	·	850 m	MPC · JPL
616355	2005 TZ_{202}	—	October 1, 2005	Kitt Peak	Spacewatch	·	840 m	MPC · JPL
616356	2005 TE_{203}	—	February 9, 2014	Haleakala	Pan-STARRS 1	·	810 m	MPC · JPL
616357	2005 TV_{203}	—	December 20, 2001	Apache Point	SDSS Collaboration	·	1.6 km	MPC · JPL
616358	2005 TC_{205}	—	January 26, 2017	Haleakala	Pan-STARRS 1	·	2.5 km	MPC · JPL
616359	2005 TG_{205}	—	August 27, 2011	Haleakala	Pan-STARRS 1	·	3.3 km	MPC · JPL
616360	2005 TH_{205}	—	December 2, 2010	Mount Lemmon	Mount Lemmon Survey	·	1.8 km	MPC · JPL
616361	2005 TN_{205}	—	October 1, 2005	Kitt Peak	Spacewatch	NYS	820 m	MPC · JPL
616362	2005 TF_{208}	—	October 13, 2005	Kitt Peak	Spacewatch	TIR	2.2 km	MPC · JPL
616363	2005 TJ_{210}	—	February 13, 2011	Mount Lemmon	Mount Lemmon Survey	·	640 m	MPC · JPL
616364	2005 TE_{211}	—	August 23, 2014	Haleakala	Pan-STARRS 1	·	1.4 km	MPC · JPL
616365	2005 TT_{211}	—	November 13, 2010	Mount Lemmon	Mount Lemmon Survey	AGN	910 m	MPC · JPL
616366	2005 TX_{211}	—	April 23, 2011	Haleakala	Pan-STARRS 1	V	550 m	MPC · JPL
616367	2005 TQ_{212}	—	October 1, 2005	Mount Lemmon	Mount Lemmon Survey	·	770 m	MPC · JPL
616368	2005 TQ_{213}	—	October 13, 2005	Kitt Peak	Spacewatch	·	1.6 km	MPC · JPL
616369	2005 TG_{214}	—	October 1, 2005	Mount Lemmon	Mount Lemmon Survey	KOR	1.1 km	MPC · JPL
616370	2005 TL_{222}	—	October 1, 2005	Kitt Peak	Spacewatch	·	1.3 km	MPC · JPL
616371	2005 TJ_{223}	—	October 4, 2005	Mount Lemmon	Mount Lemmon Survey	EOS	1.2 km	MPC · JPL
616372	2005 UR_{6}	—	October 1, 2005	Anderson Mesa	LONEOS	·	780 m	MPC · JPL
616373	2005 UA_{36}	—	October 24, 2005	Kitt Peak	Spacewatch	LIX	2.4 km	MPC · JPL
616374	2005 UE_{44}	—	October 22, 2005	Kitt Peak	Spacewatch	·	1.1 km	MPC · JPL
616375	2005 UO_{49}	—	October 23, 2005	Palomar	NEAT	·	940 m	MPC · JPL
616376	2005 UG_{58}	—	October 24, 2005	Kitt Peak	Spacewatch	·	1.0 km	MPC · JPL
616377	2005 UZ_{77}	—	October 1, 2005	Mount Lemmon	Mount Lemmon Survey	THM	1.6 km	MPC · JPL
616378	2005 UB_{86}	—	October 22, 2005	Kitt Peak	Spacewatch	MAS	590 m	MPC · JPL
616379	2005 UO_{88}	—	September 23, 2005	Kitt Peak	Spacewatch	·	740 m	MPC · JPL
616380	2005 UV_{97}	—	October 22, 2005	Kitt Peak	Spacewatch	·	1.6 km	MPC · JPL
616381	2005 UN_{102}	—	October 22, 2005	Kitt Peak	Spacewatch	NYS	830 m	MPC · JPL
616382	2005 UM_{103}	—	October 22, 2005	Kitt Peak	Spacewatch	·	2.2 km	MPC · JPL
616383	2005 UU_{112}	—	October 22, 2005	Kitt Peak	Spacewatch	·	1.1 km	MPC · JPL
616384	2005 UG_{113}	—	September 30, 2005	Mount Lemmon	Mount Lemmon Survey	NYS	820 m	MPC · JPL
616385	2005 US_{116}	—	October 23, 2005	Kitt Peak	Spacewatch	NYS	730 m	MPC · JPL
616386	2005 UJ_{132}	—	September 30, 2005	Palomar	NEAT	·	1.1 km	MPC · JPL
616387	2005 UE_{135}	—	October 25, 2005	Kitt Peak	Spacewatch	KOR	950 m	MPC · JPL
616388	2005 UH_{135}	—	September 24, 2000	Kitt Peak	Spacewatch	·	2.2 km	MPC · JPL
616389	2005 UF_{137}	—	October 25, 2005	Mount Lemmon	Mount Lemmon Survey	·	820 m	MPC · JPL
616390	2005 UZ_{144}	—	October 1, 2005	Mount Lemmon	Mount Lemmon Survey	·	1.9 km	MPC · JPL
616391	2005 UR_{153}	—	October 1, 2005	Mount Lemmon	Mount Lemmon Survey	·	940 m	MPC · JPL
616392	2005 UD_{159}	—	October 25, 2005	Kitt Peak	Spacewatch	PHO	580 m	MPC · JPL
616393	2005 UV_{163}	—	October 24, 2005	Kitt Peak	Spacewatch	·	1.6 km	MPC · JPL
616394	2005 UQ_{166}	—	October 1, 2005	Mount Lemmon	Mount Lemmon Survey	·	880 m	MPC · JPL
616395	2005 UA_{168}	—	September 30, 2005	Mount Lemmon	Mount Lemmon Survey	MAS	610 m	MPC · JPL
616396	2005 UO_{168}	—	September 29, 2005	Kitt Peak	Spacewatch	·	820 m	MPC · JPL
616397	2005 UJ_{171}	—	October 24, 2005	Kitt Peak	Spacewatch	KOR	1.1 km	MPC · JPL
616398	2005 UP_{171}	—	October 24, 2005	Kitt Peak	Spacewatch	V	540 m	MPC · JPL
616399	2005 UD_{178}	—	October 24, 2005	Kitt Peak	Spacewatch	NYS	950 m	MPC · JPL
616400	2005 UZ_{179}	—	October 24, 2005	Kitt Peak	Spacewatch	NYS	930 m	MPC · JPL

== 616401–616500 ==
back to top

Designation			Discovery			Properties		Ref
Permanent	Provisional	Named after	Date	Site	Discoverer(s)	Category	Diam.	Ref
616401	2005 UH_{185}	—	October 25, 2005	Mount Lemmon	Mount Lemmon Survey	·	1.0 km	MPC · JPL
616402	2005 UO_{185}	—	October 25, 2005	Mount Lemmon	Mount Lemmon Survey	·	500 m	MPC · JPL
616403	2005 US_{188}	—	October 27, 2005	Mount Lemmon	Mount Lemmon Survey	KOR	970 m	MPC · JPL
616404	2005 UU_{188}	—	October 27, 2005	Mount Lemmon	Mount Lemmon Survey	NYS	950 m	MPC · JPL
616405	2005 UY_{192}	—	October 22, 2005	Kitt Peak	Spacewatch	AGN	940 m	MPC · JPL
616406	2005 UC_{193}	—	September 29, 2005	Mount Lemmon	Mount Lemmon Survey	·	1.4 km	MPC · JPL
616407	2005 UQ_{203}	—	October 25, 2005	Mount Lemmon	Mount Lemmon Survey	KOR	970 m	MPC · JPL
616408	2005 UA_{209}	—	October 7, 2005	Mount Lemmon	Mount Lemmon Survey	·	1.6 km	MPC · JPL
616409	2005 UW_{219}	—	October 25, 2005	Kitt Peak	Spacewatch	·	1.7 km	MPC · JPL
616410	2005 UA_{228}	—	October 25, 2005	Kitt Peak	Spacewatch	·	1.0 km	MPC · JPL
616411	2005 UX_{235}	—	October 25, 2005	Kitt Peak	Spacewatch	EOS	1.6 km	MPC · JPL
616412	2005 UV_{239}	—	October 25, 2005	Kitt Peak	Spacewatch	·	750 m	MPC · JPL
616413	2005 UO_{246}	—	October 27, 2005	Kitt Peak	Spacewatch	·	1.5 km	MPC · JPL
616414	2005 UW_{253}	—	October 28, 2005	Kitt Peak	Spacewatch	V	800 m	MPC · JPL
616415	2005 UN_{258}	—	October 25, 2005	Kitt Peak	Spacewatch	MAS	610 m	MPC · JPL
616416	2005 UZ_{261}	—	October 26, 2005	Kitt Peak	Spacewatch	·	1.9 km	MPC · JPL
616417	2005 UH_{272}	—	October 28, 2005	Kitt Peak	Spacewatch	HOF	2.4 km	MPC · JPL
616418	2005 UU_{272}	—	October 28, 2005	Kitt Peak	Spacewatch	NYS	790 m	MPC · JPL
616419	2005 UE_{275}	—	October 27, 2005	Kitt Peak	Spacewatch	·	2.1 km	MPC · JPL
616420	2005 UD_{293}	—	October 26, 2005	Kitt Peak	Spacewatch	·	910 m	MPC · JPL
616421	2005 UW_{295}	—	October 26, 2005	Kitt Peak	Spacewatch	·	1.5 km	MPC · JPL
616422	2005 UQ_{313}	—	October 27, 2005	Socorro	LINEAR	·	2.0 km	MPC · JPL
616423	2005 UN_{320}	—	October 27, 2005	Kitt Peak	Spacewatch	·	1.5 km	MPC · JPL
616424	2005 UE_{325}	—	October 29, 2005	Mount Lemmon	Mount Lemmon Survey	·	780 m	MPC · JPL
616425	2005 UC_{332}	—	October 29, 2005	Kitt Peak	Spacewatch	·	1.2 km	MPC · JPL
616426	2005 UT_{337}	—	September 30, 2005	Mount Lemmon	Mount Lemmon Survey	·	1.7 km	MPC · JPL
616427	2005 UC_{339}	—	October 22, 2005	Kitt Peak	Spacewatch	·	1.2 km	MPC · JPL
616428	2005 UY_{344}	—	October 29, 2005	Mount Lemmon	Mount Lemmon Survey	·	1.3 km	MPC · JPL
616429	2005 UB_{358}	—	October 24, 2005	Kitt Peak	Spacewatch	PHO	470 m	MPC · JPL
616430	2005 UO_{358}	—	October 7, 2005	Kitt Peak	Spacewatch	·	1.0 km	MPC · JPL
616431	2005 UJ_{359}	—	October 25, 2005	Kitt Peak	Spacewatch	NYS	740 m	MPC · JPL
616432	2005 UE_{361}	—	October 27, 2005	Kitt Peak	Spacewatch	AGN	1.0 km	MPC · JPL
616433	2005 UJ_{362}	—	September 29, 2005	Mount Lemmon	Mount Lemmon Survey	·	2.2 km	MPC · JPL
616434	2005 US_{365}	—	October 22, 2005	Kitt Peak	Spacewatch	·	720 m	MPC · JPL
616435	2005 UA_{369}	—	October 27, 2005	Kitt Peak	Spacewatch	·	2.2 km	MPC · JPL
616436	2005 UM_{383}	—	October 27, 2005	Kitt Peak	Spacewatch	AGN	1.2 km	MPC · JPL
616437	2005 UD_{385}	—	October 27, 2005	Kitt Peak	Spacewatch	·	920 m	MPC · JPL
616438	2005 UR_{389}	—	October 29, 2005	Mount Lemmon	Mount Lemmon Survey	·	1.9 km	MPC · JPL
616439	2005 UL_{400}	—	October 26, 2005	Kitt Peak	Spacewatch	·	1.7 km	MPC · JPL
616440	2005 UN_{400}	—	September 28, 2000	Kitt Peak	Spacewatch	HOF	2.8 km	MPC · JPL
616441	2005 UJ_{401}	—	October 27, 2005	Kitt Peak	Spacewatch	·	1.8 km	MPC · JPL
616442	2005 UZ_{405}	—	September 1, 2005	Palomar	NEAT	H	570 m	MPC · JPL
616443	2005 UU_{408}	—	October 11, 2005	Kitt Peak	Spacewatch	·	1.0 km	MPC · JPL
616444	2005 US_{409}	—	October 31, 2005	Mount Lemmon	Mount Lemmon Survey	·	1.5 km	MPC · JPL
616445	2005 UG_{420}	—	October 25, 2005	Kitt Peak	Spacewatch	AGN	970 m	MPC · JPL
616446	2005 UO_{446}	—	October 10, 2005	Kitt Peak	Spacewatch	·	1.7 km	MPC · JPL
616447	2005 UY_{450}	—	October 27, 2005	Mount Lemmon	Mount Lemmon Survey	·	820 m	MPC · JPL
616448	2005 UD_{453}	—	October 29, 2005	Kitt Peak	Spacewatch	·	770 m	MPC · JPL
616449	2005 UW_{455}	—	September 13, 2005	Socorro	LINEAR	·	1.1 km	MPC · JPL
616450	2005 UQ_{456}	—	October 27, 2005	Kitt Peak	Spacewatch	·	980 m	MPC · JPL
616451	2005 UE_{461}	—	October 28, 2005	Mount Lemmon	Mount Lemmon Survey	·	1.3 km	MPC · JPL
616452	2005 UJ_{463}	—	October 30, 2005	Kitt Peak	Spacewatch	·	750 m	MPC · JPL
616453	2005 UH_{466}	—	October 1, 2005	Mount Lemmon	Mount Lemmon Survey	·	1.7 km	MPC · JPL
616454	2005 UN_{467}	—	October 30, 2005	Kitt Peak	Spacewatch	·	1.6 km	MPC · JPL
616455	2005 UT_{481}	—	October 31, 2005	Catalina	CSS	·	1.5 km	MPC · JPL
616456	2005 US_{497}	—	September 3, 2005	Palomar	NEAT	·	1.2 km	MPC · JPL
616457	2005 UQ_{514}	—	October 21, 2005	Apache Point	SDSS Collaboration	·	1.7 km	MPC · JPL
616458	2005 UU_{518}	—	October 30, 2005	Apache Point	SDSS Collaboration	·	3.9 km	MPC · JPL
616459	2005 UK_{522}	—	September 30, 2005	Mount Lemmon	Mount Lemmon Survey	·	1.2 km	MPC · JPL
616460	2005 UR_{523}	—	October 27, 2005	Apache Point	SDSS Collaboration	NYS	900 m	MPC · JPL
616461	2005 UW_{523}	—	October 27, 2005	Apache Point	SDSS Collaboration	HOF	2.0 km	MPC · JPL
616462	2005 UY_{525}	—	October 28, 2005	Kitt Peak	Spacewatch	·	1.6 km	MPC · JPL
616463	2005 UV_{531}	—	October 6, 2005	Mount Lemmon	Mount Lemmon Survey	·	1.7 km	MPC · JPL
616464	2005 UN_{532}	—	October 31, 2005	Kitt Peak	Spacewatch	AGN	1.4 km	MPC · JPL
616465	2005 UH_{533}	—	October 27, 2005	Mount Lemmon	Mount Lemmon Survey	HOF	2.0 km	MPC · JPL
616466	2005 UF_{536}	—	January 2, 2012	Mount Lemmon	Mount Lemmon Survey	·	2.1 km	MPC · JPL
616467	2005 UJ_{537}	—	October 29, 2005	Mount Lemmon	Mount Lemmon Survey	MAS	580 m	MPC · JPL
616468	2005 UL_{537}	—	October 22, 2005	Kitt Peak	Spacewatch	·	760 m	MPC · JPL
616469	2005 UO_{537}	—	March 2, 2011	Kitt Peak	Spacewatch	·	800 m	MPC · JPL
616470	2005 UZ_{538}	—	March 31, 2015	Haleakala	Pan-STARRS 1	·	1.1 km	MPC · JPL
616471	2005 UT_{539}	—	January 22, 2015	Haleakala	Pan-STARRS 1	PHO	790 m	MPC · JPL
616472	2005 UC_{540}	—	December 27, 2006	Mount Lemmon	Mount Lemmon Survey	·	1.4 km	MPC · JPL
616473	2005 UT_{542}	—	March 26, 2007	Mount Lemmon	Mount Lemmon Survey	NYS	810 m	MPC · JPL
616474	2005 UK_{543}	—	September 21, 2012	Mount Lemmon	Mount Lemmon Survey	·	850 m	MPC · JPL
616475	2005 UX_{543}	—	March 2, 2011	Mount Lemmon	Mount Lemmon Survey	·	890 m	MPC · JPL
616476	2005 UN_{545}	—	October 25, 2005	Mount Lemmon	Mount Lemmon Survey	615	1.1 km	MPC · JPL
616477	2005 VU_{14}	—	November 3, 2005	Mount Lemmon	Mount Lemmon Survey	·	1.8 km	MPC · JPL
616478	2005 VS_{22}	—	November 1, 2005	Kitt Peak	Spacewatch	·	1.2 km	MPC · JPL
616479	2005 VO_{28}	—	November 4, 2005	Mount Lemmon	Mount Lemmon Survey	·	770 m	MPC · JPL
616480	2005 VS_{32}	—	October 25, 2005	Mount Lemmon	Mount Lemmon Survey	·	2.0 km	MPC · JPL
616481	2005 VP_{34}	—	November 3, 2005	Catalina	CSS	·	740 m	MPC · JPL
616482	2005 VX_{35}	—	April 13, 2004	Kitt Peak	Spacewatch	·	760 m	MPC · JPL
616483	2005 VF_{39}	—	November 3, 2005	Mount Lemmon	Mount Lemmon Survey	NYS	930 m	MPC · JPL
616484	2005 VM_{54}	—	November 4, 2005	Kitt Peak	Spacewatch	·	1.5 km	MPC · JPL
616485	2005 VS_{58}	—	October 25, 2005	Kitt Peak	Spacewatch	MRX	1.0 km	MPC · JPL
616486	2005 VB_{62}	—	November 3, 2005	Kitt Peak	Spacewatch	H	360 m	MPC · JPL
616487	2005 VP_{83}	—	November 3, 2005	Mount Lemmon	Mount Lemmon Survey	·	600 m	MPC · JPL
616488	2005 VW_{99}	—	October 26, 2005	Kitt Peak	Spacewatch	·	2.1 km	MPC · JPL
616489	2005 VQ_{104}	—	November 3, 2005	Mount Lemmon	Mount Lemmon Survey	·	750 m	MPC · JPL
616490	2005 VZ_{106}	—	October 24, 2005	Kitt Peak	Spacewatch	MAS	540 m	MPC · JPL
616491	2005 VM_{132}	—	October 26, 2005	Apache Point	SDSS Collaboration	·	2.6 km	MPC · JPL
616492	2005 VP_{133}	—	October 25, 2005	Apache Point	SDSS Collaboration	URS	2.7 km	MPC · JPL
616493	2005 VQ_{135}	—	November 6, 2005	Mount Lemmon	Mount Lemmon Survey	·	1.0 km	MPC · JPL
616494	2005 VA_{136}	—	November 1, 2005	Kitt Peak	Spacewatch	MAR	1.2 km	MPC · JPL
616495	2005 VS_{137}	—	November 5, 2005	Kitt Peak	Spacewatch	HOF	2.4 km	MPC · JPL
616496	2005 VP_{138}	—	October 12, 1998	Anderson Mesa	LONEOS	·	1.4 km	MPC · JPL
616497	2005 VU_{139}	—	November 12, 2005	Kitt Peak	Spacewatch	EUP	2.5 km	MPC · JPL
616498	2005 VQ_{140}	—	April 15, 2013	Haleakala	Pan-STARRS 1	·	1.5 km	MPC · JPL
616499	2005 VZ_{140}	—	November 12, 2005	Kitt Peak	Spacewatch	·	1.8 km	MPC · JPL
616500	2005 VO_{141}	—	May 29, 2008	Kitt Peak	Spacewatch	·	920 m	MPC · JPL

== 616501–616600 ==
back to top

Designation			Discovery			Properties		Ref
Permanent	Provisional	Named after	Date	Site	Discoverer(s)	Category	Diam.	Ref
616501	2005 VY_{142}	—	November 4, 2005	Kitt Peak	Spacewatch	·	730 m	MPC · JPL
616502	2005 VC_{143}	—	October 20, 2012	Haleakala	Pan-STARRS 1	·	940 m	MPC · JPL
616503	2005 VW_{143}	—	November 4, 2005	Mount Lemmon	Mount Lemmon Survey	EOS	1.8 km	MPC · JPL
616504	2005 VF_{145}	—	August 31, 2014	Haleakala	Pan-STARRS 1	·	1.5 km	MPC · JPL
616505	2005 VY_{145}	—	November 6, 2005	Mount Lemmon	Mount Lemmon Survey	·	1.2 km	MPC · JPL
616506	2005 VY_{146}	—	September 6, 2016	Mount Lemmon	Mount Lemmon Survey	·	960 m	MPC · JPL
616507	2005 VT_{147}	—	December 3, 2010	Mount Lemmon	Mount Lemmon Survey	·	1.9 km	MPC · JPL
616508	2005 VJ_{148}	—	October 28, 2005	Mount Lemmon	Mount Lemmon Survey	·	630 m	MPC · JPL
616509	2005 VO_{149}	—	November 1, 2005	Mount Lemmon	Mount Lemmon Survey	·	760 m	MPC · JPL
616510	2005 WR_{14}	—	November 22, 2005	Kitt Peak	Spacewatch	AGN	1.1 km	MPC · JPL
616511	2005 WW_{16}	—	November 22, 2005	Kitt Peak	Spacewatch	·	810 m	MPC · JPL
616512	2005 WM_{26}	—	November 21, 2005	Kitt Peak	Spacewatch	·	1.2 km	MPC · JPL
616513	2005 WV_{58}	—	July 3, 2005	Palomar	NEAT	·	1.5 km	MPC · JPL
616514	2005 WY_{76}	—	November 25, 2005	Kitt Peak	Spacewatch	·	2.1 km	MPC · JPL
616515	2005 WA_{81}	—	November 26, 2005	Mount Lemmon	Mount Lemmon Survey	·	1.8 km	MPC · JPL
616516	2005 WD_{82}	—	October 28, 2005	Mount Lemmon	Mount Lemmon Survey	·	1.0 km	MPC · JPL
616517	2005 WZ_{82}	—	October 22, 2005	Kitt Peak	Spacewatch	·	1.9 km	MPC · JPL
616518	2005 WM_{101}	—	November 29, 2005	Kitt Peak	Spacewatch	·	2.1 km	MPC · JPL
616519	2005 WJ_{107}	—	November 25, 2005	Mount Lemmon	Mount Lemmon Survey	MAS	500 m	MPC · JPL
616520	2005 WN_{112}	—	November 30, 2005	Mount Lemmon	Mount Lemmon Survey	·	1.7 km	MPC · JPL
616521	2005 WT_{112}	—	October 30, 2005	Mount Lemmon	Mount Lemmon Survey	·	1.1 km	MPC · JPL
616522	2005 WN_{116}	—	November 30, 2005	Kitt Peak	Spacewatch	·	1.6 km	MPC · JPL
616523	2005 WJ_{123}	—	November 17, 2014	Haleakala	Pan-STARRS 1	·	1.4 km	MPC · JPL
616524	2005 WQ_{127}	—	November 25, 2005	Mount Lemmon	Mount Lemmon Survey	·	1.9 km	MPC · JPL
616525	2005 WA_{128}	—	November 25, 2005	Mount Lemmon	Mount Lemmon Survey	·	1.4 km	MPC · JPL
616526	2005 WR_{130}	—	November 25, 2005	Mount Lemmon	Mount Lemmon Survey	·	1.7 km	MPC · JPL
616527	2005 WF_{153}	—	November 29, 2005	Anderson Mesa	LONEOS	GAL	2.1 km	MPC · JPL
616528	2005 WT_{161}	—	October 25, 2005	Mount Lemmon	Mount Lemmon Survey	·	1.4 km	MPC · JPL
616529	2005 WL_{189}	—	November 30, 2005	Kitt Peak	Spacewatch	·	630 m	MPC · JPL
616530	2005 WH_{201}	—	November 28, 2005	Kitt Peak	Spacewatch	·	2.2 km	MPC · JPL
616531	2005 WW_{203}	—	November 25, 2005	Mount Lemmon	Mount Lemmon Survey	·	1.4 km	MPC · JPL
616532	2005 WQ_{214}	—	November 26, 2005	Mount Lemmon	Mount Lemmon Survey	MAS	610 m	MPC · JPL
616533	2005 WX_{214}	—	October 1, 2014	Haleakala	Pan-STARRS 1	·	2.0 km	MPC · JPL
616534	2005 WA_{215}	—	June 7, 2013	Haleakala	Pan-STARRS 1	·	1.8 km	MPC · JPL
616535	2005 WE_{215}	—	March 30, 2011	Catalina	CSS	·	1.3 km	MPC · JPL
616536	2005 WT_{216}	—	November 25, 2005	Kitt Peak	Spacewatch	KOR	1.1 km	MPC · JPL
616537	2005 WB_{218}	—	November 26, 2005	Mount Lemmon	Mount Lemmon Survey	·	850 m	MPC · JPL
616538	2005 XE_{3}	—	November 21, 2005	Kitt Peak	Spacewatch	·	2.9 km	MPC · JPL
616539	2005 XP_{4}	—	December 2, 2005	Mount Lemmon	Mount Lemmon Survey	AGN	1.0 km	MPC · JPL
616540	2005 XR_{8}	—	October 29, 2005	Catalina	CSS	·	1.4 km	MPC · JPL
616541	2005 XG_{14}	—	December 1, 2005	Mount Lemmon	Mount Lemmon Survey	·	1.7 km	MPC · JPL
616542	2005 XG_{22}	—	November 12, 2005	Kitt Peak	Spacewatch	·	1.4 km	MPC · JPL
616543	2005 XU_{23}	—	December 2, 2005	Mount Lemmon	Mount Lemmon Survey	·	1.4 km	MPC · JPL
616544	2005 XB_{30}	—	December 1, 2005	Kitt Peak	Spacewatch	·	1.5 km	MPC · JPL
616545	2005 XJ_{33}	—	October 17, 2001	Socorro	LINEAR	NYS	1.1 km	MPC · JPL
616546	2005 XQ_{35}	—	December 4, 2005	Mount Lemmon	Mount Lemmon Survey	AGN	1.1 km	MPC · JPL
616547	2005 XY_{39}	—	December 5, 2005	Kitt Peak	Spacewatch	·	1.1 km	MPC · JPL
616548	2005 XY_{44}	—	December 2, 2005	Kitt Peak	Spacewatch	·	1.1 km	MPC · JPL
616549	2005 XQ_{50}	—	December 2, 2005	Kitt Peak	Spacewatch	·	1.6 km	MPC · JPL
616550	2005 XN_{55}	—	December 5, 2005	Mount Lemmon	Mount Lemmon Survey	NYS	970 m	MPC · JPL
616551	2005 XZ_{56}	—	December 1, 2005	Kitt Peak	Spacewatch	AGN	910 m	MPC · JPL
616552	2005 XG_{62}	—	December 5, 2005	Mount Lemmon	Mount Lemmon Survey	·	1.0 km	MPC · JPL
616553	2005 XB_{65}	—	December 7, 2005	Kitt Peak	Spacewatch	·	1.8 km	MPC · JPL
616554	2005 XM_{78}	—	November 10, 2005	Kitt Peak	Spacewatch	H	460 m	MPC · JPL
616555	2005 XD_{94}	—	December 1, 2005	Kitt Peak	Wasserman, L. H., Millis, R. L.	AEO	1.1 km	MPC · JPL
616556	2005 XM_{95}	—	October 1, 2005	Kitt Peak	Spacewatch	AGN	930 m	MPC · JPL
616557	2005 XO_{102}	—	December 1, 2005	Kitt Peak	Wasserman, L. H., Millis, R. L.	·	680 m	MPC · JPL
616558	2005 XJ_{103}	—	December 1, 2005	Kitt Peak	Wasserman, L. H., Millis, R. L.	·	1.0 km	MPC · JPL
616559	2005 XC_{106}	—	December 1, 2005	Kitt Peak	Wasserman, L. H., Millis, R. L.	·	1.2 km	MPC · JPL
616560	2005 XN_{113}	—	December 2, 2005	Kitt Peak	Deep Ecliptic Survey	res · 2:5	185 km	MPC · JPL
616561	2005 XV_{120}	—	December 26, 2009	Kitt Peak	Spacewatch	·	1.3 km	MPC · JPL
616562	2005 XZ_{121}	—	February 16, 2010	Mount Lemmon	Mount Lemmon Survey	·	1.0 km	MPC · JPL
616563	2005 XJ_{124}	—	December 4, 2005	Kitt Peak	Spacewatch	·	1.9 km	MPC · JPL
616564	2005 XK_{127}	—	December 1, 2005	Kitt Peak	Spacewatch	·	1.8 km	MPC · JPL
616565	2005 XX_{128}	—	July 1, 2008	Kitt Peak	Spacewatch	·	1.1 km	MPC · JPL
616566	2005 XK_{130}	—	April 14, 2013	Mount Lemmon	Mount Lemmon Survey	·	1.3 km	MPC · JPL
616567	2005 XH_{131}	—	March 23, 2012	Mount Lemmon	Mount Lemmon Survey	·	1.3 km	MPC · JPL
616568	2005 XX_{132}	—	December 2, 2005	Kitt Peak	Wasserman, L. H., Millis, R. L.	L5	7.9 km	MPC · JPL
616569	2005 YX_{28}	—	December 22, 2005	Kitt Peak	Spacewatch	·	920 m	MPC · JPL
616570	2005 YZ_{31}	—	December 22, 2005	Kitt Peak	Spacewatch	MRX	910 m	MPC · JPL
616571	2005 YD_{41}	—	December 1, 2005	Kitt Peak	Spacewatch	·	2.2 km	MPC · JPL
616572	2005 YK_{73}	—	December 24, 2005	Kitt Peak	Spacewatch	NYS	1.1 km	MPC · JPL
616573	2005 YF_{96}	—	December 25, 2005	Kitt Peak	Spacewatch	·	1.0 km	MPC · JPL
616574	2005 YG_{113}	—	December 25, 2005	Mount Lemmon	Mount Lemmon Survey	KOR	1.1 km	MPC · JPL
616575	2005 YR_{132}	—	December 26, 2005	Kitt Peak	Spacewatch	·	2.0 km	MPC · JPL
616576	2005 YX_{139}	—	December 28, 2005	Kitt Peak	Spacewatch	·	2.0 km	MPC · JPL
616577	2005 YD_{140}	—	December 5, 2005	Mount Lemmon	Mount Lemmon Survey	·	1.5 km	MPC · JPL
616578	2005 YG_{146}	—	December 29, 2005	Mount Lemmon	Mount Lemmon Survey	·	1 km	MPC · JPL
616579	2005 YW_{149}	—	December 25, 2005	Kitt Peak	Spacewatch	·	630 m	MPC · JPL
616580	2005 YB_{154}	—	December 29, 2005	Mount Lemmon	Mount Lemmon Survey	·	1.3 km	MPC · JPL
616581	2005 YZ_{157}	—	December 27, 2005	Kitt Peak	Spacewatch	KOR	1.1 km	MPC · JPL
616582	2005 YM_{161}	—	December 27, 2005	Kitt Peak	Spacewatch	·	1.2 km	MPC · JPL
616583	2005 YE_{163}	—	December 27, 2005	Mount Lemmon	Mount Lemmon Survey	·	990 m	MPC · JPL
616584	2005 YV_{200}	—	December 22, 2005	Kitt Peak	Spacewatch	·	1.0 km	MPC · JPL
616585	2005 YK_{204}	—	December 25, 2005	Mount Lemmon	Mount Lemmon Survey	DOR	2.0 km	MPC · JPL
616586	2005 YE_{215}	—	November 28, 2005	Palomar	NEAT	·	720 m	MPC · JPL
616587	2005 YJ_{217}	—	December 30, 2005	Kitt Peak	Spacewatch	KOR	1.1 km	MPC · JPL
616588	2005 YX_{230}	—	December 27, 2005	Kitt Peak	Spacewatch	PHO	730 m	MPC · JPL
616589	2005 YN_{234}	—	December 28, 2005	Kitt Peak	Spacewatch	·	1.7 km	MPC · JPL
616590	2005 YM_{242}	—	December 30, 2005	Kitt Peak	Spacewatch	·	1.7 km	MPC · JPL
616591	2005 YP_{255}	—	December 30, 2005	Kitt Peak	Spacewatch	·	1.9 km	MPC · JPL
616592	2005 YD_{271}	—	December 28, 2005	Kitt Peak	Spacewatch	·	1.1 km	MPC · JPL
616593	2005 YG_{285}	—	December 2, 2005	Kitt Peak	Spacewatch	·	1.5 km	MPC · JPL
616594	2005 YP_{292}	—	November 26, 2005	Mount Lemmon	Mount Lemmon Survey	EOS	1.4 km	MPC · JPL
616595	2005 YM_{295}	—	March 16, 2012	Haleakala	Pan-STARRS 1	·	1.9 km	MPC · JPL
616596	2005 YG_{296}	—	December 3, 2012	Mount Lemmon	Mount Lemmon Survey	MAS	630 m	MPC · JPL
616597	2005 YL_{296}	—	August 28, 2009	Kitt Peak	Spacewatch	·	1.5 km	MPC · JPL
616598	2005 YX_{302}	—	December 30, 2005	Kitt Peak	Spacewatch	·	1.9 km	MPC · JPL
616599	2006 AH_{24}	—	January 5, 2006	Kitt Peak	Spacewatch	BRA	1.2 km	MPC · JPL
616600	2006 AN_{29}	—	December 24, 2005	Kitt Peak	Spacewatch	fast	1.0 km	MPC · JPL

== 616601–616700 ==
back to top

Designation			Discovery			Properties		Ref
Permanent	Provisional	Named after	Date	Site	Discoverer(s)	Category	Diam.	Ref
616601	2006 AT_{33}	—	January 6, 2006	Kitt Peak	Spacewatch	·	2.5 km	MPC · JPL
616602	2006 AA_{77}	—	January 6, 2006	Kitt Peak	Spacewatch	·	1.9 km	MPC · JPL
616603	2006 AQ_{82}	—	January 6, 2006	Socorro	LINEAR	·	1.2 km	MPC · JPL
616604	2006 AF_{87}	—	January 2, 2006	Mount Lemmon	Mount Lemmon Survey	·	830 m	MPC · JPL
616605	2006 AA_{103}	—	February 23, 2006	Anderson Mesa	LONEOS	·	1.2 km	MPC · JPL
616606	2006 AZ_{106}	—	December 25, 2005	Kitt Peak	Spacewatch	·	1.7 km	MPC · JPL
616607	2006 AW_{109}	—	September 4, 2008	Kitt Peak	Spacewatch	·	990 m	MPC · JPL
616608	2006 AV_{111}	—	September 29, 2008	Catalina	CSS	·	960 m	MPC · JPL
616609	2006 BM_{21}	—	January 22, 2006	Mount Lemmon	Mount Lemmon Survey	·	1.1 km	MPC · JPL
616610	2006 BB_{26}	—	January 22, 2006	Anderson Mesa	LONEOS	·	830 m	MPC · JPL
616611	2006 BU_{36}	—	January 23, 2006	Kitt Peak	Spacewatch	·	3.3 km	MPC · JPL
616612	2006 BO_{60}	—	January 26, 2006	Kitt Peak	Spacewatch	·	780 m	MPC · JPL
616613	2006 BU_{64}	—	January 7, 2006	Mount Lemmon	Mount Lemmon Survey	·	1.3 km	MPC · JPL
616614	2006 BF_{107}	—	December 24, 2005	Kitt Peak	Spacewatch	·	1.1 km	MPC · JPL
616615	2006 BW_{117}	—	January 26, 2006	Mount Lemmon	Mount Lemmon Survey	·	840 m	MPC · JPL
616616	2006 BQ_{124}	—	January 26, 2006	Kitt Peak	Spacewatch	T_{j} (2.93)	2.6 km	MPC · JPL
616617	2006 BX_{137}	—	January 28, 2006	Mount Lemmon	Mount Lemmon Survey	NYS	770 m	MPC · JPL
616618	2006 BS_{148}	—	January 22, 2006	Catalina	CSS	·	1.4 km	MPC · JPL
616619	2006 BZ_{151}	—	January 25, 2006	Kitt Peak	Spacewatch	·	1.1 km	MPC · JPL
616620	2006 BU_{155}	—	January 25, 2006	Kitt Peak	Spacewatch	·	1.6 km	MPC · JPL
616621	2006 BH_{171}	—	January 9, 2006	Kitt Peak	Spacewatch	·	740 m	MPC · JPL
616622	2006 BS_{174}	—	January 27, 2006	Kitt Peak	Spacewatch	·	730 m	MPC · JPL
616623	2006 BJ_{182}	—	October 7, 2005	Mauna Kea	A. Boattini	·	1.2 km	MPC · JPL
616624	2006 BA_{183}	—	January 27, 2006	Mount Lemmon	Mount Lemmon Survey	·	970 m	MPC · JPL
616625	2006 BR_{198}	—	January 30, 2006	Kitt Peak	Spacewatch	·	2.2 km	MPC · JPL
616626	2006 BB_{209}	—	August 22, 2004	Kitt Peak	Spacewatch	·	1.2 km	MPC · JPL
616627	2006 BM_{217}	—	January 27, 2006	Catalina	CSS	H	540 m	MPC · JPL
616628	2006 BG_{221}	—	July 5, 2003	Kitt Peak	Spacewatch	KOR	1.4 km	MPC · JPL
616629	2006 BO_{225}	—	January 30, 2006	Kitt Peak	Spacewatch	EUP	3.1 km	MPC · JPL
616630	2006 BS_{237}	—	January 23, 2006	Kitt Peak	Spacewatch	·	1.2 km	MPC · JPL
616631	2006 BY_{244}	—	January 31, 2006	Kitt Peak	Spacewatch	VER	2.0 km	MPC · JPL
616632	2006 BC_{254}	—	January 31, 2006	Kitt Peak	Spacewatch	·	1.6 km	MPC · JPL
616633	2006 BD_{284}	—	January 31, 2006	Mount Lemmon	Mount Lemmon Survey	EOS	1.4 km	MPC · JPL
616634	2006 BT_{286}	—	August 22, 2014	Haleakala	Pan-STARRS 1	·	2.4 km	MPC · JPL
616635	2006 BJ_{287}	—	October 6, 2008	Mount Lemmon	Mount Lemmon Survey	·	1.1 km	MPC · JPL
616636	2006 BM_{288}	—	July 30, 2008	Mount Lemmon	Mount Lemmon Survey	MAS	550 m	MPC · JPL
616637	2006 BR_{291}	—	August 21, 2008	Kitt Peak	Spacewatch	·	810 m	MPC · JPL
616638	2006 BX_{291}	—	January 28, 2006	Kitt Peak	Spacewatch	·	800 m	MPC · JPL
616639	2006 BR_{292}	—	March 2, 2012	Mount Lemmon	Mount Lemmon Survey	·	2.1 km	MPC · JPL
616640	2006 BK_{300}	—	January 31, 2006	Kitt Peak	Spacewatch	·	1.5 km	MPC · JPL
616641	2006 CL_{2}	—	February 1, 2006	Mount Lemmon	Mount Lemmon Survey	KOR	1.1 km	MPC · JPL
616642	2006 CA_{9}	—	February 1, 2006	Mount Lemmon	Mount Lemmon Survey	MAS	480 m	MPC · JPL
616643	2006 CD_{10}	—	February 4, 2006	Catalina	CSS	H	420 m	MPC · JPL
616644	2006 CH_{14}	—	February 1, 2006	Kitt Peak	Spacewatch	MAS	550 m	MPC · JPL
616645	2006 CK_{19}	—	February 1, 2006	Mount Lemmon	Mount Lemmon Survey	AGN	990 m	MPC · JPL
616646	2006 CV_{31}	—	February 2, 2006	Kitt Peak	Spacewatch	·	2.3 km	MPC · JPL
616647	2006 CA_{40}	—	October 24, 2005	Mauna Kea	A. Boattini	·	2.0 km	MPC · JPL
616648	2006 CE_{44}	—	May 27, 2003	Kitt Peak	Spacewatch	HNS	1.4 km	MPC · JPL
616649	2006 CQ_{56}	—	January 26, 2006	Kitt Peak	Spacewatch	T_{j} (2.99)	2.4 km	MPC · JPL
616650	2006 CH_{83}	—	January 30, 2011	Mount Lemmon	Mount Lemmon Survey	·	1.6 km	MPC · JPL
616651	2006 DN_{2}	—	January 30, 2006	Kitt Peak	Spacewatch	·	1.1 km	MPC · JPL
616652	2006 DM_{33}	—	December 2, 2005	Kitt Peak	Wasserman, L. H., Millis, R. L.	·	1.3 km	MPC · JPL
616653	2006 DO_{39}	—	February 21, 2006	Mount Lemmon	Mount Lemmon Survey	·	1.2 km	MPC · JPL
616654	2006 DB_{40}	—	February 22, 2006	Palomar	NEAT	TIR	3.8 km	MPC · JPL
616655	2006 DG_{52}	—	January 23, 2006	Kitt Peak	Spacewatch	·	2.9 km	MPC · JPL
616656	2006 DX_{81}	—	February 24, 2006	Kitt Peak	Spacewatch	MAS	520 m	MPC · JPL
616657	2006 DM_{99}	—	January 26, 2006	Kitt Peak	Spacewatch	·	590 m	MPC · JPL
616658	2006 DR_{114}	—	February 27, 2006	Mount Lemmon	Mount Lemmon Survey	LIX	2.4 km	MPC · JPL
616659	2006 DX_{127}	—	January 26, 2006	Mount Lemmon	Mount Lemmon Survey	·	790 m	MPC · JPL
616660	2006 DE_{131}	—	February 25, 2006	Kitt Peak	Spacewatch	·	1.6 km	MPC · JPL
616661	2006 DH_{142}	—	February 25, 2006	Kitt Peak	Spacewatch	·	2.1 km	MPC · JPL
616662	2006 DU_{147}	—	February 25, 2006	Kitt Peak	Spacewatch	·	560 m	MPC · JPL
616663	2006 DQ_{153}	—	February 25, 2006	Kitt Peak	Spacewatch	T_{j} (2.88)	2.6 km	MPC · JPL
616664	2006 DP_{168}	—	February 27, 2006	Kitt Peak	Spacewatch	EOS	1.6 km	MPC · JPL
616665	2006 DT_{170}	—	February 27, 2006	Kitt Peak	Spacewatch	·	1.6 km	MPC · JPL
616666	2006 DT_{172}	—	December 3, 2005	Mauna Kea	A. Boattini	EOS	1.6 km	MPC · JPL
616667	2006 DJ_{178}	—	February 27, 2006	Mount Lemmon	Mount Lemmon Survey	NYS	680 m	MPC · JPL
616668	2006 DS_{178}	—	March 16, 2010	Mount Lemmon	Mount Lemmon Survey	·	1.4 km	MPC · JPL
616669	2006 DM_{187}	—	February 27, 2006	Kitt Peak	Spacewatch	·	1.8 km	MPC · JPL
616670	2006 DO_{187}	—	February 27, 2006	Kitt Peak	Spacewatch	HOF	2.5 km	MPC · JPL
616671	2006 DQ_{194}	—	January 26, 2006	Kitt Peak	Spacewatch	·	550 m	MPC · JPL
616672	2006 DA_{209}	—	February 27, 2006	Kitt Peak	Spacewatch	MAR	810 m	MPC · JPL
616673	2006 DA_{222}	—	February 27, 2006	Kitt Peak	Spacewatch	EUN	1.1 km	MPC · JPL
616674	2006 DE_{222}	—	March 18, 2010	Mount Lemmon	Mount Lemmon Survey	·	940 m	MPC · JPL
616675	2006 DD_{224}	—	January 26, 2011	Mount Lemmon	Mount Lemmon Survey	EOS	1.4 km	MPC · JPL
616676	2006 DH_{224}	—	April 23, 2014	Mount Lemmon	Mount Lemmon Survey	·	1.2 km	MPC · JPL
616677	2006 ED_{3}	—	March 2, 2006	Kitt Peak	Spacewatch	·	1.6 km	MPC · JPL
616678	2006 EU_{5}	—	February 21, 2006	Mount Lemmon	Mount Lemmon Survey	·	1.4 km	MPC · JPL
616679	2006 EZ_{7}	—	February 20, 2006	Mount Lemmon	Mount Lemmon Survey	·	2.5 km	MPC · JPL
616680	2006 EE_{11}	—	March 2, 2006	Kitt Peak	Spacewatch	·	1.6 km	MPC · JPL
616681	2006 EN_{23}	—	February 20, 2006	Kitt Peak	Spacewatch	·	1.3 km	MPC · JPL
616682	2006 ER_{38}	—	March 4, 2006	Kitt Peak	Spacewatch	·	1.2 km	MPC · JPL
616683	2006 ER_{52}	—	January 22, 2006	Mount Lemmon	Mount Lemmon Survey	·	2.1 km	MPC · JPL
616684	2006 EU_{52}	—	February 25, 2006	Mount Lemmon	Mount Lemmon Survey	·	800 m	MPC · JPL
616685	2006 ED_{54}	—	March 4, 2006	Kitt Peak	Spacewatch	·	2.5 km	MPC · JPL
616686	2006 EO_{62}	—	November 4, 2004	Kitt Peak	Spacewatch	·	1.4 km	MPC · JPL
616687	2006 ES_{78}	—	September 6, 2008	Kitt Peak	Spacewatch	·	2.0 km	MPC · JPL
616688 Gaowei	2016 SE_{37}	Gaowei	September 29, 2016	Xingming	Sun, P., X. Gao	·	1.4 km	MPC · JPL
616689 Yihangyiyang	2016 VD_{27}	Yihangyiyang	November 1, 2016	Xingming	Sun, G., X. Gao	·	1.4 km	MPC · JPL
616690 Liaoxi	2016 YY_{12}	Liaoxi	December 31, 2016	Xingming	Gao, W., X. Gao	·	1.8 km	MPC · JPL
616691	1995 BJ_{9}	—	January 29, 1995	Kitt Peak	Spacewatch	·	1.6 km	MPC · JPL
616692	1995 GA_{5}	—	April 5, 1995	Kitt Peak	Spacewatch	·	540 m	MPC · JPL
616693	1995 SL_{14}	—	September 18, 1995	Kitt Peak	Spacewatch	LIX	2.7 km	MPC · JPL
616694	1995 SH_{37}	—	September 24, 1995	Kitt Peak	Spacewatch	·	1.4 km	MPC · JPL
616695	1995 SG_{75}	—	September 20, 1995	Kitt Peak	Spacewatch	·	2.3 km	MPC · JPL
616696	1995 UE_{21}	—	October 19, 1995	Kitt Peak	Spacewatch	·	700 m	MPC · JPL
616697	1995 UT_{34}	—	October 21, 1995	Kitt Peak	Spacewatch	·	1.6 km	MPC · JPL
616698	1995 UK_{54}	—	October 22, 1995	Kitt Peak	Spacewatch	·	1.1 km	MPC · JPL
616699	1995 UO_{73}	—	October 20, 1995	Kitt Peak	Spacewatch	VER	2.9 km	MPC · JPL
616700	1995 UV_{73}	—	October 20, 1995	Kitt Peak	Spacewatch	KOR	1.1 km	MPC · JPL

== 616701–616800 ==
back to top

Designation			Discovery			Properties		Ref
Permanent	Provisional	Named after	Date	Site	Discoverer(s)	Category	Diam.	Ref
616701	1995 UH_{74}	—	October 21, 1995	Kitt Peak	Spacewatch	·	2.3 km	MPC · JPL
616702	1995 WN_{29}	—	November 19, 1995	Kitt Peak	Spacewatch	·	3.1 km	MPC · JPL
616703	1996 RQ_{8}	—	September 6, 1996	Kitt Peak	Spacewatch	·	450 m	MPC · JPL
616704	1996 RR_{21}	—	September 7, 1996	Kitt Peak	Spacewatch	·	1.3 km	MPC · JPL
616705	1996 VL_{23}	—	November 10, 1996	Kitt Peak	Spacewatch	VER	2.3 km	MPC · JPL
616706	1996 VP_{32}	—	November 5, 1996	Kitt Peak	Spacewatch	NEM	2.0 km	MPC · JPL
616707	1996 VL_{36}	—	November 10, 1996	Kitt Peak	Spacewatch	·	490 m	MPC · JPL
616708	1997 AH_{11}	—	January 2, 1997	Kitt Peak	Spacewatch	BRA	1.4 km	MPC · JPL
616709	1997 CE	—	February 1, 1997	Kitt Peak	Spacewatch	·	840 m	MPC · JPL
616710	1997 CU_{20}	—	February 3, 1997	Kitt Peak	Spacewatch	VER	2.2 km	MPC · JPL
616711	1997 EX_{22}	—	March 10, 1997	Kitt Peak	Spacewatch	·	3.0 km	MPC · JPL
616712	1997 SS_{12}	—	September 28, 1997	Kitt Peak	Spacewatch	·	1.4 km	MPC · JPL
616713	1997 SX_{22}	—	September 29, 1997	Kitt Peak	Spacewatch	·	2.2 km	MPC · JPL
616714	1997 TM	—	October 1, 1997	Mauna Kea	C. Veillet, R. Shanks	·	2.1 km	MPC · JPL
616715	1997 TU_{30}	—	November 1, 2006	Mount Lemmon	Mount Lemmon Survey	·	1.3 km	MPC · JPL
616716	1997 WL_{17}	—	November 23, 1997	Kitt Peak	Spacewatch	·	840 m	MPC · JPL
616717	1998 BN_{29}	—	January 25, 1998	Kitt Peak	Spacewatch	·	1.0 km	MPC · JPL
616718	1998 DB_{27}	—	February 24, 1998	Kitt Peak	Spacewatch	·	2.7 km	MPC · JPL
616719	1998 RJ_{13}	—	September 15, 1998	Kitt Peak	Spacewatch	·	490 m	MPC · JPL
616720	1998 SD_{178}	—	September 19, 1998	Apache Point	SDSS Collaboration	·	1.3 km	MPC · JPL
616721	1998 SP_{178}	—	October 31, 2011	Kitt Peak	Spacewatch	·	1.1 km	MPC · JPL
616722	1998 SQ_{178}	—	September 11, 2010	La Sagra	OAM	HNS	1.0 km	MPC · JPL
616723	1998 SF_{179}	—	October 18, 2012	Haleakala	Pan-STARRS 1	·	510 m	MPC · JPL
616724	1998 UQ_{51}	—	September 21, 2008	Kitt Peak	Spacewatch	·	1.3 km	MPC · JPL
616725	1998 VN_{57}	—	November 14, 1998	Kitt Peak	Spacewatch	·	1.4 km	MPC · JPL
616726	1998 WE_{44}	—	November 17, 1998	La Palma	A. Fitzsimmons, R. Budden	·	1.9 km	MPC · JPL
616727	1998 XW_{22}	—	December 11, 1998	Kitt Peak	Spacewatch	·	1.5 km	MPC · JPL
616728	1998 YZ_{33}	—	November 10, 2005	Kitt Peak	Spacewatch	·	1.0 km	MPC · JPL
616729	1999 CJ_{160}	—	February 9, 2014	Haleakala	Pan-STARRS 1	MAS	610 m	MPC · JPL
616730	1999 FH_{99}	—	December 3, 2015	Mount Lemmon	Mount Lemmon Survey	·	1.2 km	MPC · JPL
616731	1999 FG_{100}	—	January 22, 2015	Haleakala	Pan-STARRS 1	EOS	1.3 km	MPC · JPL
616732	1999 FJ_{100}	—	October 12, 2014	Mount Lemmon	Mount Lemmon Survey	EUN	950 m	MPC · JPL
616733	1999 FS_{100}	—	March 21, 1999	Apache Point	SDSS Collaboration	EOS	1.8 km	MPC · JPL
616734	1999 FF_{101}	—	April 4, 2008	Mount Lemmon	Mount Lemmon Survey	·	1.3 km	MPC · JPL
616735	1999 QW_{3}	—	September 29, 2003	Needville	Needville	·	770 m	MPC · JPL
616736	1999 TM_{227}	—	October 1, 1999	Kitt Peak	Spacewatch	HOF	2.9 km	MPC · JPL
616737	1999 TN_{340}	—	November 7, 2005	Mauna Kea	A. Boattini	·	1.7 km	MPC · JPL
616738	1999 VS_{83}	—	November 2, 1999	Kitt Peak	Spacewatch	·	500 m	MPC · JPL
616739	1999 VL_{138}	—	November 9, 1999	Kitt Peak	Spacewatch	·	960 m	MPC · JPL
616740	1999 XJ_{9}	—	December 2, 1999	Kitt Peak	Spacewatch	EUN	810 m	MPC · JPL
616741	1999 XW_{258}	—	December 7, 1999	Kitt Peak	Spacewatch	·	1.0 km	MPC · JPL
616742	1999 YH_{25}	—	December 27, 1999	Kitt Peak	Spacewatch	·	610 m	MPC · JPL
616743	2000 AA_{259}	—	February 19, 2013	Nogales	M. Schwartz, P. R. Holvorcem	·	1.1 km	MPC · JPL
616744	2000 BY_{43}	—	January 28, 2000	Kitt Peak	Spacewatch	·	1.7 km	MPC · JPL
616745	2000 BF_{44}	—	January 28, 2000	Kitt Peak	Spacewatch	KOR	1.3 km	MPC · JPL
616746	2000 CF_{110}	—	February 11, 2000	Kitt Peak	Spacewatch	·	2.1 km	MPC · JPL
616747	2000 CN_{127}	—	February 2, 2000	Kitt Peak	Spacewatch	·	1.2 km	MPC · JPL
616748	2000 CN_{132}	—	February 4, 2000	Kitt Peak	Spacewatch	·	2.1 km	MPC · JPL
616749	2000 CS_{132}	—	February 4, 2000	Kitt Peak	Spacewatch	·	740 m	MPC · JPL
616750	2000 CS_{137}	—	February 4, 2000	Kitt Peak	Spacewatch	·	1.8 km	MPC · JPL
616751	2000 DM_{118}	—	February 27, 2000	Kitt Peak	Spacewatch	·	430 m	MPC · JPL
616752	2000 ED_{51}	—	March 3, 2000	Kitt Peak	Spacewatch	·	1.2 km	MPC · JPL
616753	2000 EH_{53}	—	April 13, 2013	Haleakala	Pan-STARRS 1	·	920 m	MPC · JPL
616754	2000 EX_{98}	—	March 3, 2000	Socorro	LINEAR	·	1.3 km	MPC · JPL
616755	2000 ES_{209}	—	May 6, 2011	Kitt Peak	Spacewatch	·	800 m	MPC · JPL
616756	2000 EV_{210}	—	February 17, 2007	Kitt Peak	Spacewatch	·	750 m	MPC · JPL
616757	2000 EV_{211}	—	June 18, 2010	Mount Lemmon	Mount Lemmon Survey	·	1.4 km	MPC · JPL
616758	2000 FJ_{4}	—	March 27, 2000	Kitt Peak	Spacewatch	·	2.2 km	MPC · JPL
616759	2000 FQ_{4}	—	March 27, 2000	Kitt Peak	Spacewatch	·	870 m	MPC · JPL
616760	2000 FZ_{68}	—	March 27, 2000	Kitt Peak	Spacewatch	·	1.3 km	MPC · JPL
616761	2000 FR_{74}	—	March 10, 2007	Mount Lemmon	Mount Lemmon Survey	·	820 m	MPC · JPL
616762	2000 GL_{22}	—	April 5, 2000	Socorro	LINEAR	·	1.6 km	MPC · JPL
616763	2000 GH_{188}	—	January 2, 2012	Mount Lemmon	Mount Lemmon Survey	·	1.2 km	MPC · JPL
616764	2000 GN_{188}	—	November 26, 2014	Haleakala	Pan-STARRS 1	EOS	1.4 km	MPC · JPL
616765	2000 GY_{188}	—	October 2, 2013	Haleakala	Pan-STARRS 1	·	870 m	MPC · JPL
616766	2000 GF_{189}	—	May 8, 2011	Mount Lemmon	Mount Lemmon Survey	MAS	580 m	MPC · JPL
616767	2000 GK_{189}	—	April 13, 2000	Kitt Peak	Spacewatch	·	890 m	MPC · JPL
616768	2000 HR_{17}	—	April 24, 2000	Kitt Peak	Spacewatch	·	980 m	MPC · JPL
616769	2000 HD_{61}	—	April 29, 2000	Socorro	LINEAR	·	1.8 km	MPC · JPL
616770	2000 HQ_{97}	—	March 14, 2007	Kitt Peak	Spacewatch	NYS	930 m	MPC · JPL
616771	2000 JA_{80}	—	May 6, 2000	Kitt Peak	Spacewatch	·	980 m	MPC · JPL
616772	2000 JT_{95}	—	February 2, 2008	Mount Lemmon	Mount Lemmon Survey	·	1.2 km	MPC · JPL
616773	2000 JU_{95}	—	April 14, 2016	Haleakala	Pan-STARRS 1	EOS	1.4 km	MPC · JPL
616774	2000 JP_{96}	—	November 13, 2006	Catalina	CSS	EUN	1.3 km	MPC · JPL
616775	2000 JV_{96}	—	June 5, 2011	Nogales	M. Schwartz, P. R. Holvorcem	·	880 m	MPC · JPL
616776	2000 KN_{14}	—	May 28, 2000	Socorro	LINEAR	MAS	750 m	MPC · JPL
616777	2000 KX_{27}	—	May 28, 2000	Socorro	LINEAR	JUN	1.0 km	MPC · JPL
616778	2000 KX_{84}	—	May 28, 2000	Kitt Peak	Spacewatch	·	960 m	MPC · JPL
616779	2000 NX_{29}	—	April 18, 2007	Catalina	CSS	·	1.1 km	MPC · JPL
616780	2000 OP_{65}	—	July 31, 2000	Cerro Tololo	Deep Ecliptic Survey	·	1.4 km	MPC · JPL
616781	2000 OJ_{73}	—	January 21, 2014	Kitt Peak	Spacewatch	EOS	1.6 km	MPC · JPL
616782	2000 QK_{234}	—	September 27, 2000	Kitt Peak	Spacewatch	L5	7.5 km	MPC · JPL
616783	2000 QX_{244}	—	August 30, 2000	Kitt Peak	Spacewatch	MAS	580 m	MPC · JPL
616784	2000 QP_{255}	—	May 24, 2006	Kitt Peak	Spacewatch	·	550 m	MPC · JPL
616785	2000 QM_{256}	—	September 13, 2013	Mount Lemmon	Mount Lemmon Survey	·	520 m	MPC · JPL
616786	2000 QJ_{258}	—	September 10, 2004	Kitt Peak	Spacewatch	NYS	870 m	MPC · JPL
616787	2000 QJ_{261}	—	August 28, 2000	Cerro Tololo	Deep Ecliptic Survey	HOF	1.8 km	MPC · JPL
616788	2000 RB_{108}	—	September 5, 2000	Apache Point	SDSS	L5	6.7 km	MPC · JPL
616789	2000 RO_{108}	—	July 27, 2011	Haleakala	Pan-STARRS 1	·	950 m	MPC · JPL
616790	2000 RW_{108}	—	March 24, 2014	Haleakala	Pan-STARRS 1	NYS	920 m	MPC · JPL
616791	2000 RQ_{110}	—	October 8, 2008	Kitt Peak	Spacewatch	·	1.1 km	MPC · JPL
616792	2000 RU_{110}	—	August 15, 2009	Kitt Peak	Spacewatch	·	1.5 km	MPC · JPL
616793	2000 SV_{202}	—	September 24, 2000	Socorro	LINEAR	·	1.1 km	MPC · JPL
616794	2000 SY_{267}	—	September 27, 2000	Socorro	LINEAR	·	900 m	MPC · JPL
616795	2000 SH_{273}	—	September 8, 2000	Kitt Peak	Spacewatch	·	2.1 km	MPC · JPL
616796	2000 SC_{320}	—	September 26, 2000	Kitt Peak	Spacewatch	·	3.7 km	MPC · JPL
616797	2000 SC_{359}	—	September 28, 2000	Socorro	LINEAR	·	3.1 km	MPC · JPL
616798	2000 SN_{377}	—	August 25, 2003	Cerro Tololo	Deep Ecliptic Survey	·	700 m	MPC · JPL
616799	2000 SE_{378}	—	November 23, 2014	Mount Lemmon	Mount Lemmon Survey	·	2.2 km	MPC · JPL
616800	2000 SL_{379}	—	September 25, 2009	Mount Lemmon	Mount Lemmon Survey	·	1.4 km	MPC · JPL

== 616801–616900 ==
back to top

Designation			Discovery			Properties		Ref
Permanent	Provisional	Named after	Date	Site	Discoverer(s)	Category	Diam.	Ref
616801	2000 SU_{382}	—	October 28, 2014	Haleakala	Pan-STARRS 1	·	1.9 km	MPC · JPL
616802	2000 SJ_{384}	—	April 6, 2008	Kitt Peak	Spacewatch	L5	7.8 km	MPC · JPL
616803	2000 SS_{384}	—	November 26, 2014	Haleakala	Pan-STARRS 1	L5	7.5 km	MPC · JPL
616804	2000 SS_{385}	—	April 4, 2014	Mount Lemmon	Mount Lemmon Survey	·	1.0 km	MPC · JPL
616805	2000 TP_{76}	—	November 2, 2010	Mount Lemmon	Mount Lemmon Survey	·	580 m	MPC · JPL
616806	2000 TK_{77}	—	November 26, 2012	Mount Lemmon	Mount Lemmon Survey	·	2.6 km	MPC · JPL
616807	2000 TV_{80}	—	October 8, 2012	Mount Lemmon	Mount Lemmon Survey	L5	6.7 km	MPC · JPL
616808	2000 TM_{81}	—	October 10, 2010	Mount Lemmon	Mount Lemmon Survey	·	570 m	MPC · JPL
616809	2000 UQ_{115}	—	June 20, 2015	Haleakala	Pan-STARRS 1	NYS	1.0 km	MPC · JPL
616810	2000 WE_{196}	—	November 26, 2000	Kitt Peak	Spacewatch	·	2.1 km	MPC · JPL
616811	2000 WQ_{200}	—	April 25, 2015	Haleakala	Pan-STARRS 1	·	570 m	MPC · JPL
616812	2000 WW_{200}	—	November 17, 2004	Campo Imperatore	CINEOS	·	1.2 km	MPC · JPL
616813	2000 WA_{203}	—	August 1, 2017	Haleakala	Pan-STARRS 1	·	3.2 km	MPC · JPL
616814	2000 YN_{144}	—	December 9, 2010	Kitt Peak	Spacewatch	·	650 m	MPC · JPL
616815	2000 YC_{145}	—	March 4, 2008	Kitt Peak	Spacewatch	·	600 m	MPC · JPL
616816	2000 YN_{145}	—	December 20, 2000	Kitt Peak	Spacewatch	·	470 m	MPC · JPL
616817	2001 BW_{64}	—	January 17, 2001	Haleakala	NEAT	EUN	1.3 km	MPC · JPL
616818	2001 DV_{113}	—	September 20, 2014	Haleakala	Pan-STARRS 1	NAE	1.8 km	MPC · JPL
616819	2001 DW_{113}	—	January 25, 2009	Kitt Peak	Spacewatch	·	920 m	MPC · JPL
616820	2001 DJ_{114}	—	August 14, 2012	Siding Spring	SSS	·	660 m	MPC · JPL
616821	2001 FB_{197}	—	March 27, 2001	Cerro Tololo	Deep Lens Survey	KON	1.6 km	MPC · JPL
616822	2001 FK_{201}	—	March 22, 2001	Kitt Peak	Spacewatch	·	960 m	MPC · JPL
616823	2001 FQ_{221}	—	September 28, 2003	Kitt Peak	Spacewatch	·	740 m	MPC · JPL
616824	2001 FQ_{224}	—	March 22, 2001	Kitt Peak	SKADS	·	440 m	MPC · JPL
616825	2001 FE_{231}	—	February 27, 2006	Mount Lemmon	Mount Lemmon Survey	·	1.3 km	MPC · JPL
616826	2001 FN_{245}	—	May 8, 2014	Haleakala	Pan-STARRS 1	KON	2.0 km	MPC · JPL
616827	2001 HL_{69}	—	April 7, 2008	Kitt Peak	Spacewatch	·	650 m	MPC · JPL
616828	2001 HH_{70}	—	March 27, 2018	Mount Lemmon	Mount Lemmon Survey	PHO	780 m	MPC · JPL
616829	2001 KW_{82}	—	January 17, 2013	Haleakala	Pan-STARRS 1	H	400 m	MPC · JPL
616830	2001 KR_{83}	—	July 18, 2005	Palomar	NEAT	·	760 m	MPC · JPL
616831	2001 KK_{84}	—	December 9, 2015	Haleakala	Pan-STARRS 1	·	930 m	MPC · JPL
616832	2001 KU_{88}	—	April 8, 2013	Haleakala	Pan-STARRS 1	·	1.4 km	MPC · JPL
616833	2001 KO_{89}	—	May 22, 2001	Cerro Tololo	Deep Ecliptic Survey	·	1.7 km	MPC · JPL
616834	2001 MM_{31}	—	June 30, 2001	Palomar	NEAT	·	880 m	MPC · JPL
616835	2001 NA_{2}	—	July 12, 2001	Palomar	NEAT	·	1.6 km	MPC · JPL
616836	2001 OG_{29}	—	July 18, 2001	Palomar	NEAT	·	1.1 km	MPC · JPL
616837	2001 PQ_{53}	—	August 14, 2001	Palomar	NEAT	·	1.2 km	MPC · JPL
616838	2001 PL_{57}	—	August 14, 2001	Haleakala	NEAT	·	1.7 km	MPC · JPL
616839	2001 PV_{65}	—	August 15, 2001	Haleakala	NEAT	·	840 m	MPC · JPL
616840	2001 QT_{95}	—	August 22, 2001	Kitt Peak	Spacewatch	·	690 m	MPC · JPL
616841	2001 QN_{107}	—	August 24, 2001	Socorro	LINEAR	H	580 m	MPC · JPL
616842	2001 QE_{119}	—	August 17, 2001	Socorro	LINEAR	·	890 m	MPC · JPL
616843	2001 QO_{126}	—	August 17, 2001	Palomar	NEAT	·	1.7 km	MPC · JPL
616844	2001 QM_{252}	—	August 25, 2001	Socorro	LINEAR	EUN	1.2 km	MPC · JPL
616845	2001 QR_{269}	—	August 20, 2001	Pic du Midi	Observatoire du Pic du Midi	·	550 m	MPC · JPL
616846	2001 QG_{279}	—	August 19, 2001	Socorro	LINEAR	·	870 m	MPC · JPL
616847	2001 QR_{286}	—	August 17, 2001	Palomar	NEAT	·	1.9 km	MPC · JPL
616848	2001 QO_{310}	—	August 19, 2001	Cerro Tololo	Deep Ecliptic Survey	·	1.0 km	MPC · JPL
616849	2001 QH_{337}	—	October 9, 2008	Kitt Peak	Spacewatch	·	540 m	MPC · JPL
616850	2001 QT_{337}	—	July 1, 2014	Mount Lemmon	Mount Lemmon Survey	BAR	990 m	MPC · JPL
616851	2001 RJ_{36}	—	August 23, 2001	Anderson Mesa	LONEOS	·	670 m	MPC · JPL
616852	2001 RW_{43}	—	December 10, 2005	Kitt Peak	Spacewatch	·	770 m	MPC · JPL
616853	2001 RR_{54}	—	August 24, 2001	Kitt Peak	Spacewatch	EUN	910 m	MPC · JPL
616854	2001 RN_{60}	—	September 9, 2001	Palomar	NEAT	·	1.1 km	MPC · JPL
616855	2001 RX_{106}	—	September 12, 2001	Socorro	LINEAR	NYS	990 m	MPC · JPL
616856	2001 RW_{119}	—	August 12, 2001	Palomar	NEAT	·	2.9 km	MPC · JPL
616857	2001 RG_{156}	—	May 26, 2011	Mount Lemmon	Mount Lemmon Survey	·	1.3 km	MPC · JPL
616858	2001 SY_{1}	—	September 14, 2001	Palomar	NEAT	·	1.4 km	MPC · JPL
616859	2001 SO_{8}	—	September 12, 2001	Kitt Peak	Spacewatch	·	1.4 km	MPC · JPL
616860	2001 SZ_{125}	—	August 23, 2001	Anderson Mesa	LONEOS	·	1.2 km	MPC · JPL
616861	2001 SK_{166}	—	September 19, 2001	Socorro	LINEAR	EOS	1.6 km	MPC · JPL
616862	2001 SC_{216}	—	August 24, 2001	Socorro	LINEAR	·	820 m	MPC · JPL
616863	2001 SK_{256}	—	September 19, 2001	Socorro	LINEAR	·	1.1 km	MPC · JPL
616864	2001 SV_{298}	—	September 20, 2001	Socorro	LINEAR	NYS	890 m	MPC · JPL
616865	2001 SM_{308}	—	September 21, 2001	Socorro	LINEAR	·	1.1 km	MPC · JPL
616866	2001 ST_{312}	—	September 21, 2001	Socorro	LINEAR	·	1.2 km	MPC · JPL
616867	2001 SW_{360}	—	March 16, 2007	Mount Lemmon	Mount Lemmon Survey	·	800 m	MPC · JPL
616868	2001 TO_{5}	—	October 10, 2001	Palomar	NEAT	·	1.2 km	MPC · JPL
616869	2001 TV_{150}	—	October 10, 2001	Palomar	NEAT	·	1.1 km	MPC · JPL
616870	2001 TF_{157}	—	October 14, 2001	Kitt Peak	Spacewatch	WIT	860 m	MPC · JPL
616871	2001 TA_{201}	—	October 11, 2001	Socorro	LINEAR	·	1.8 km	MPC · JPL
616872	2001 TQ_{232}	—	October 15, 2001	Palomar	NEAT	·	950 m	MPC · JPL
616873	2001 TH_{234}	—	October 15, 2001	Kitt Peak	Spacewatch	MRX	730 m	MPC · JPL
616874	2001 TG_{261}	—	September 18, 2001	Apache Point	SDSS	·	1.7 km	MPC · JPL
616875	2001 TL_{262}	—	October 10, 2001	Palomar	NEAT	·	2.2 km	MPC · JPL
616876	2001 TA_{263}	—	October 18, 2001	Palomar	NEAT	·	1.1 km	MPC · JPL
616877	2001 TP_{263}	—	October 23, 2001	Palomar	NEAT	EUN	1.2 km	MPC · JPL
616878	2001 TF_{264}	—	October 10, 2001	Palomar	NEAT	·	1.3 km	MPC · JPL
616879	2001 TX_{264}	—	October 14, 2001	Kitt Peak	Spacewatch	·	1.1 km	MPC · JPL
616880	2001 TR_{265}	—	December 8, 2015	Mount Lemmon	Mount Lemmon Survey	·	1.3 km	MPC · JPL
616881	2001 TA_{266}	—	October 4, 2013	Mount Lemmon	Mount Lemmon Survey	L5	10 km	MPC · JPL
616882	2001 TA_{268}	—	September 18, 2012	Mount Lemmon	Mount Lemmon Survey	L5	6.2 km	MPC · JPL
616883	2001 UW_{73}	—	September 17, 2001	Anderson Mesa	LONEOS	·	1.3 km	MPC · JPL
616884	2001 UO_{100}	—	September 23, 2001	Kitt Peak	Spacewatch	·	1.2 km	MPC · JPL
616885	2001 UX_{104}	—	October 18, 2001	Palomar	NEAT	NYS	910 m	MPC · JPL
616886	2001 UL_{227}	—	October 16, 2001	Palomar	NEAT	·	2.4 km	MPC · JPL
616887	2001 UK_{228}	—	December 5, 2005	Kitt Peak	Spacewatch	·	990 m	MPC · JPL
616888	2001 UA_{229}	—	October 16, 2001	Palomar	NEAT	·	1.4 km	MPC · JPL
616889	2001 UJ_{230}	—	November 11, 2001	Kitt Peak	Spacewatch	·	1.5 km	MPC · JPL
616890	2001 UZ_{232}	—	October 23, 2013	Mount Lemmon	Mount Lemmon Survey	L5	7.9 km	MPC · JPL
616891	2001 UG_{233}	—	September 28, 2008	Mount Lemmon	Mount Lemmon Survey	·	560 m	MPC · JPL
616892	2001 UR_{234}	—	August 19, 2006	Kitt Peak	Spacewatch	·	2.1 km	MPC · JPL
616893	2001 UV_{235}	—	November 24, 2012	Kitt Peak	Spacewatch	MAS	590 m	MPC · JPL
616894	2001 UB_{236}	—	October 17, 2010	Mount Lemmon	Mount Lemmon Survey	·	1.5 km	MPC · JPL
616895	2001 UC_{236}	—	October 27, 2008	Mount Lemmon	Mount Lemmon Survey	V	680 m	MPC · JPL
616896	2001 UD_{236}	—	November 21, 2014	Haleakala	Pan-STARRS 1	L5	6.0 km	MPC · JPL
616897	2001 UP_{236}	—	November 10, 2010	Mount Lemmon	Mount Lemmon Survey	·	1.5 km	MPC · JPL
616898	2001 UT_{236}	—	October 15, 2012	Mount Lemmon	Mount Lemmon Survey	L5	8.3 km	MPC · JPL
616899	2001 UY_{236}	—	September 1, 2005	Kitt Peak	Spacewatch	·	1.3 km	MPC · JPL
616900	2001 UB_{237}	—	August 23, 2008	Kitt Peak	Spacewatch	·	850 m	MPC · JPL

== 616901–617000 ==
back to top

Designation			Discovery			Properties		Ref
Permanent	Provisional	Named after	Date	Site	Discoverer(s)	Category	Diam.	Ref
616901	2001 UY_{237}	—	October 25, 2001	Apache Point	SDSS Collaboration	·	870 m	MPC · JPL
616902	2001 UQ_{240}	—	June 17, 2015	Haleakala	Pan-STARRS 1	·	760 m	MPC · JPL
616903	2001 UD_{241}	—	October 25, 2001	Apache Point	SDSS Collaboration	·	650 m	MPC · JPL
616904	2001 UF_{241}	—	October 25, 2001	Apache Point	SDSS Collaboration	·	1.7 km	MPC · JPL
616905	2001 VY_{75}	—	November 15, 2001	Kitt Peak	Spacewatch	·	1.5 km	MPC · JPL
616906	2001 VB_{85}	—	November 12, 2001	Socorro	LINEAR	H	490 m	MPC · JPL
616907	2001 VD_{135}	—	October 22, 2012	Mount Lemmon	Mount Lemmon Survey	·	2.5 km	MPC · JPL
616908	2001 VT_{137}	—	November 12, 2001	Apache Point	SDSS	VER	2.5 km	MPC · JPL
616909	2001 VT_{138}	—	November 12, 2001	Apache Point	SDSS Collaboration	·	2.2 km	MPC · JPL
616910	2001 WF_{21}	—	November 18, 2001	Socorro	LINEAR	·	980 m	MPC · JPL
616911	2001 WJ_{69}	—	November 20, 2001	Socorro	LINEAR	·	3.3 km	MPC · JPL
616912	2001 WO_{104}	—	November 20, 2001	Socorro	LINEAR	MAS	700 m	MPC · JPL
616913	2001 WB_{107}	—	October 21, 2012	Haleakala	Pan-STARRS 1	·	1.0 km	MPC · JPL
616914	2001 XW_{181}	—	December 14, 2001	Socorro	LINEAR	PHO	1.0 km	MPC · JPL
616915	2001 XH_{268}	—	December 3, 2010	Mount Lemmon	Mount Lemmon Survey	·	1.9 km	MPC · JPL
616916	2001 XA_{269}	—	August 30, 2008	La Sagra	OAM	·	910 m	MPC · JPL
616917	2001 YZ_{23}	—	November 19, 2001	Kitt Peak	Spacewatch	DOR	2.2 km	MPC · JPL
616918	2001 YB_{24}	—	December 18, 2001	Socorro	LINEAR	·	2.6 km	MPC · JPL
616919	2001 YC_{24}	—	December 18, 2001	Socorro	LINEAR	·	2.8 km	MPC · JPL
616920	2001 YL_{25}	—	December 18, 2001	Socorro	LINEAR	·	3.0 km	MPC · JPL
616921	2001 YD_{57}	—	December 18, 2001	Socorro	LINEAR	LUT	4.5 km	MPC · JPL
616922	2001 YS_{97}	—	December 14, 2001	Kitt Peak	Spacewatch	·	1.1 km	MPC · JPL
616923	2001 YB_{100}	—	December 17, 2001	Socorro	LINEAR	H	490 m	MPC · JPL
616924	2001 YY_{163}	—	October 10, 2008	Mount Lemmon	Mount Lemmon Survey	·	1.1 km	MPC · JPL
616925	2001 YE_{165}	—	January 26, 2014	Haleakala	Pan-STARRS 1	·	2.9 km	MPC · JPL
616926	2001 YS_{165}	—	March 30, 2008	Kitt Peak	Spacewatch	L5	8.3 km	MPC · JPL
616927	2001 YT_{165}	—	May 25, 2007	Mount Lemmon	Mount Lemmon Survey	·	1.1 km	MPC · JPL
616928	2002 AZ_{48}	—	January 5, 2002	Palomar	NEAT	·	1.8 km	MPC · JPL
616929	2002 AD_{190}	—	December 21, 2001	Kitt Peak	Spacewatch	PHO	740 m	MPC · JPL
616930	2002 AK_{212}	—	July 1, 2013	Haleakala	Pan-STARRS 1	·	540 m	MPC · JPL
616931	2002 AB_{214}	—	May 13, 2009	Mount Lemmon	Mount Lemmon Survey	·	2.7 km	MPC · JPL
616932	2002 AK_{215}	—	April 11, 2010	Mount Lemmon	Mount Lemmon Survey	·	3.2 km	MPC · JPL
616933	2002 BU_{32}	—	January 19, 2002	Kitt Peak	Spacewatch	·	3.2 km	MPC · JPL
616934	2002 BB_{33}	—	January 15, 2008	Mount Lemmon	Mount Lemmon Survey	·	3.5 km	MPC · JPL
616935	2002 BD_{34}	—	November 9, 2016	Mount Lemmon	Mount Lemmon Survey	·	1.1 km	MPC · JPL
616936	2002 CG_{14}	—	February 7, 2002	Socorro	LINEAR	·	1.3 km	MPC · JPL
616937	2002 CF_{158}	—	January 15, 2002	Haleakala	NEAT	EUP	3.6 km	MPC · JPL
616938	2002 CU_{318}	—	November 23, 2006	Mount Lemmon	Mount Lemmon Survey	·	4.5 km	MPC · JPL
616939	2002 CG_{319}	—	August 31, 2005	Kitt Peak	Spacewatch	·	2.7 km	MPC · JPL
616940	2002 CZ_{319}	—	February 3, 2008	Kitt Peak	Spacewatch	·	2.7 km	MPC · JPL
616941	2002 CR_{321}	—	April 5, 2014	Haleakala	Pan-STARRS 1	PHO	710 m	MPC · JPL
616942	2002 CZ_{321}	—	November 3, 2008	Mount Lemmon	Mount Lemmon Survey	·	1.4 km	MPC · JPL
616943	2002 CS_{322}	—	May 4, 2014	Kitt Peak	Spacewatch	·	980 m	MPC · JPL
616944	2002 CY_{324}	—	March 21, 2015	Haleakala	Pan-STARRS 1	·	450 m	MPC · JPL
616945	2002 CJ_{325}	—	August 24, 2017	Haleakala	Pan-STARRS 1	T_{j} (2.99)	2.8 km	MPC · JPL
616946	2002 ED_{114}	—	March 10, 2002	Kitt Peak	Spacewatch	·	670 m	MPC · JPL
616947	2002 EO_{166}	—	January 19, 2015	Haleakala	Pan-STARRS 1	·	500 m	MPC · JPL
616948	2002 EA_{167}	—	October 3, 2010	Kitt Peak	Spacewatch	·	460 m	MPC · JPL
616949	2002 EL_{169}	—	March 25, 2006	Kitt Peak	Spacewatch	·	1.1 km	MPC · JPL
616950	2002 GG_{182}	—	April 5, 2002	Palomar	NEAT	NYS	1.2 km	MPC · JPL
616951	2002 GU_{186}	—	April 8, 2002	Palomar	NEAT	·	590 m	MPC · JPL
616952	2002 GZ_{192}	—	February 11, 2008	Mount Lemmon	Mount Lemmon Survey	·	3.0 km	MPC · JPL
616953	2002 GO_{193}	—	February 28, 2008	Mount Lemmon	Mount Lemmon Survey	·	520 m	MPC · JPL
616954	2002 GH_{194}	—	April 13, 2002	Kitt Peak	Spacewatch	·	990 m	MPC · JPL
616955	2002 GZ_{194}	—	September 30, 2006	Mount Lemmon	Mount Lemmon Survey	·	500 m	MPC · JPL
616956	2002 GG_{197}	—	November 16, 2009	Mount Lemmon	Mount Lemmon Survey	KOR	1.2 km	MPC · JPL
616957	2002 JR_{151}	—	August 21, 2009	La Sagra	OAM	·	770 m	MPC · JPL
616958	2002 LM_{24}	—	June 2, 2002	Palomar	NEAT	·	1.7 km	MPC · JPL
616959	2002 LF_{64}	—	July 10, 2002	Campo Imperatore	CINEOS	·	1.2 km	MPC · JPL
616960	2002 LG_{65}	—	December 9, 2015	Haleakala	Pan-STARRS 1	EOS	2.1 km	MPC · JPL
616961	2002 MD_{6}	—	June 16, 2002	Palomar	NEAT	·	570 m	MPC · JPL
616962	2002 MA_{7}	—	February 10, 2011	Mount Lemmon	Mount Lemmon Survey	·	590 m	MPC · JPL
616963	2002 NC_{21}	—	July 9, 2002	Socorro	LINEAR	·	1.5 km	MPC · JPL
616964	2002 NW_{58}	—	July 20, 2002	Palomar	NEAT	·	2.0 km	MPC · JPL
616965	2002 NT_{64}	—	July 2, 2002	Palomar	NEAT	·	600 m	MPC · JPL
616966	2002 NC_{67}	—	July 5, 2002	Kitt Peak	Spacewatch	·	830 m	MPC · JPL
616967	2002 NO_{70}	—	July 9, 2002	Palomar	NEAT	(5)	940 m	MPC · JPL
616968	2002 NA_{73}	—	July 8, 2002	Palomar	NEAT	·	1.1 km	MPC · JPL
616969	2002 NC_{73}	—	June 11, 2002	Kitt Peak	Spacewatch	·	2.7 km	MPC · JPL
616970	2002 NS_{76}	—	August 5, 2002	Palomar	NEAT	(5)	750 m	MPC · JPL
616971	2002 NQ_{77}	—	August 5, 2002	Palomar	NEAT	·	540 m	MPC · JPL
616972	2002 NS_{80}	—	July 14, 2002	Palomar	NEAT	·	1.8 km	MPC · JPL
616973	2002 NF_{81}	—	April 2, 2005	Kitt Peak	Spacewatch	·	710 m	MPC · JPL
616974	2002 NB_{82}	—	August 5, 2002	Palomar	NEAT	(5)	890 m	MPC · JPL
616975	2002 ND_{82}	—	August 13, 2002	Anderson Mesa	LONEOS	MAR	1.2 km	MPC · JPL
616976	2002 NU_{82}	—	July 2, 2014	Kitt Peak	Spacewatch	·	920 m	MPC · JPL
616977	2002 OV_{23}	—	July 13, 2002	Haleakala	NEAT	·	890 m	MPC · JPL
616978	2002 OV_{31}	—	July 17, 2002	Palomar	NEAT	H	470 m	MPC · JPL
616979	2002 OE_{35}	—	July 21, 2002	Palomar	NEAT	·	980 m	MPC · JPL
616980	2002 PC_{7}	—	August 6, 2002	Palomar	NEAT	·	760 m	MPC · JPL
616981	2002 PE_{7}	—	July 5, 2002	Palomar	NEAT	·	610 m	MPC · JPL
616982	2002 PH_{62}	—	July 22, 2002	Palomar	NEAT	·	570 m	MPC · JPL
616983	2002 PY_{79}	—	August 4, 2002	Palomar	NEAT	·	1.6 km	MPC · JPL
616984	2002 PN_{179}	—	August 8, 2002	Palomar	NEAT	·	2.3 km	MPC · JPL
616985	2002 PT_{181}	—	August 15, 2002	Palomar	NEAT	·	1.1 km	MPC · JPL
616986	2002 PM_{182}	—	August 11, 2002	Palomar	NEAT	·	620 m	MPC · JPL
616987	2002 PU_{183}	—	August 15, 2002	Palomar	NEAT	·	1.7 km	MPC · JPL
616988	2002 PU_{185}	—	August 15, 2002	Palomar	NEAT	·	1.4 km	MPC · JPL
616989	2002 PZ_{186}	—	August 11, 2002	Palomar	NEAT	·	1.1 km	MPC · JPL
616990	2002 PM_{187}	—	August 18, 2002	Palomar	NEAT	·	960 m	MPC · JPL
616991	2002 PW_{188}	—	August 8, 2002	Palomar	NEAT	·	870 m	MPC · JPL
616992	2002 PW_{192}	—	July 21, 2006	Mount Lemmon	Mount Lemmon Survey	·	620 m	MPC · JPL
616993	2002 PZ_{197}	—	August 15, 2002	Palomar	NEAT	·	1.4 km	MPC · JPL
616994	2002 PF_{200}	—	October 26, 2009	Mount Lemmon	Mount Lemmon Survey	·	630 m	MPC · JPL
616995	2002 PW_{200}	—	August 6, 2002	Palomar	NEAT	·	610 m	MPC · JPL
616996	2002 PA_{202}	—	May 13, 2005	Mount Lemmon	Mount Lemmon Survey	·	610 m	MPC · JPL
616997	2002 PA_{203}	—	January 31, 2008	Mount Lemmon	Mount Lemmon Survey	·	1.1 km	MPC · JPL
616998	2002 PF_{205}	—	November 9, 2007	Kitt Peak	Spacewatch	·	950 m	MPC · JPL
616999	2002 QJ_{10}	—	August 16, 2002	Palomar	NEAT	H	550 m	MPC · JPL
617000	2002 QT_{32}	—	August 29, 2002	Palomar	NEAT	·	900 m	MPC · JPL

back to top

== Meaning of names ==
As minor planet discoveries are confirmed, they are given a permanent number by the IAU's Minor Planet Center (MPC), and the discoverers can then submit names for them, following the IAU's naming conventions. The list below concerns those minor planets in the specified number-range that have received names, and explains the meanings of those names.

Official naming citations of newly named small Solar System bodies are approved and published in a bulletin by IAU's Working Group for Small Bodies Nomenclature (WGSBN). Before May 2021, citations were published in MPC's Minor Planet Circulars for many decades. Recent citations can also be found on the JPL Small-Body Database (SBDB). Until his death in 2016, German astronomer Lutz D. Schmadel compiled these citations into the Dictionary of Minor Planet Names (DMP) and regularly updated the collection.

Based on Paul Herget's The Names of the Minor Planets, Schmadel also researched the unclear origin of numerous asteroids, most of which had been named prior to World War II. This article incorporates text from this source, which is in the public domain: SBDB New namings may only be added to this list below after official publication as the preannouncement of names is condemned. The WGSBN publishes a comprehensive guideline for the naming rules of non-cometary small Solar System bodies.

Named minor planet	Provisional	This minor planet was named for...	Ref · Catalog
616184 Malahat	2005 PK_{26}	The Malahat First Nation is one of five bands that comprise the Saanich Nation, located on the west coast of Canada.	IAU · 616184
616688 Gaowei	2016 SE_{37}	Gao Wei (born 1982), a Chinese amateur astronomer from Nong'an County and member of the Xingming Observatory Sky Survey team. He has discovered novae in the Andromeda and Triangulum Galaxy, as well as supernovae and minor planets.	IAU · 616688
616689 Yihangyiyang	2016 VD_{27}	Sun Yihang (born 2014) and Sun Yiyang (born 2017) are the sons of Chinese amateur astronomer Sun Guoyou who co-discovered this minor planet.	IAU · 616689
616690 Liaoxi	2016 YY_{12}	Liao Xi (b. 1961), a Chinese amateur astronomer.	IAU · 616690
