= Nong'an Town =

Nong'an 农安镇
- Town
- Location in Jilin
- Coordinates: 44°26′05″N 125°10′30″E
- Country: People's Republic of China
- Province: Jilin
- Sub-provincial city: Changchun
- County: Nong'an

Area
  - Total: 426 km^{2} (164 sq mi)
- Elevation: 196 m (643 ft)

Population (2010)
  - Total: 224,387
  - Density: 527/km^{2} (1,360/sq mi)
- Time zone: UTC+8 (China Standard)
- Postal code: 130200
- Area code: 0431

Nong’an Town (simplified Chinese: 农安镇; traditional Chinese: 農安鎮; pinyin: Nóng'ān Zhèn) is a town in and the county seat of namesake Nong'an County, in northwestern Jilin province, China, about 60 km (37 mi) north of Changchun, the provincial capital. As of 2010, the town had a population of 224,387 residing in an area of 426 km^{2} (164 sq mi). It is served by China National Highway 302 and is located just off G12 Hunchun–Ulanhot Expressway.
