= Nong'an County =

Nong'an County 农安县 Nung-an
- County
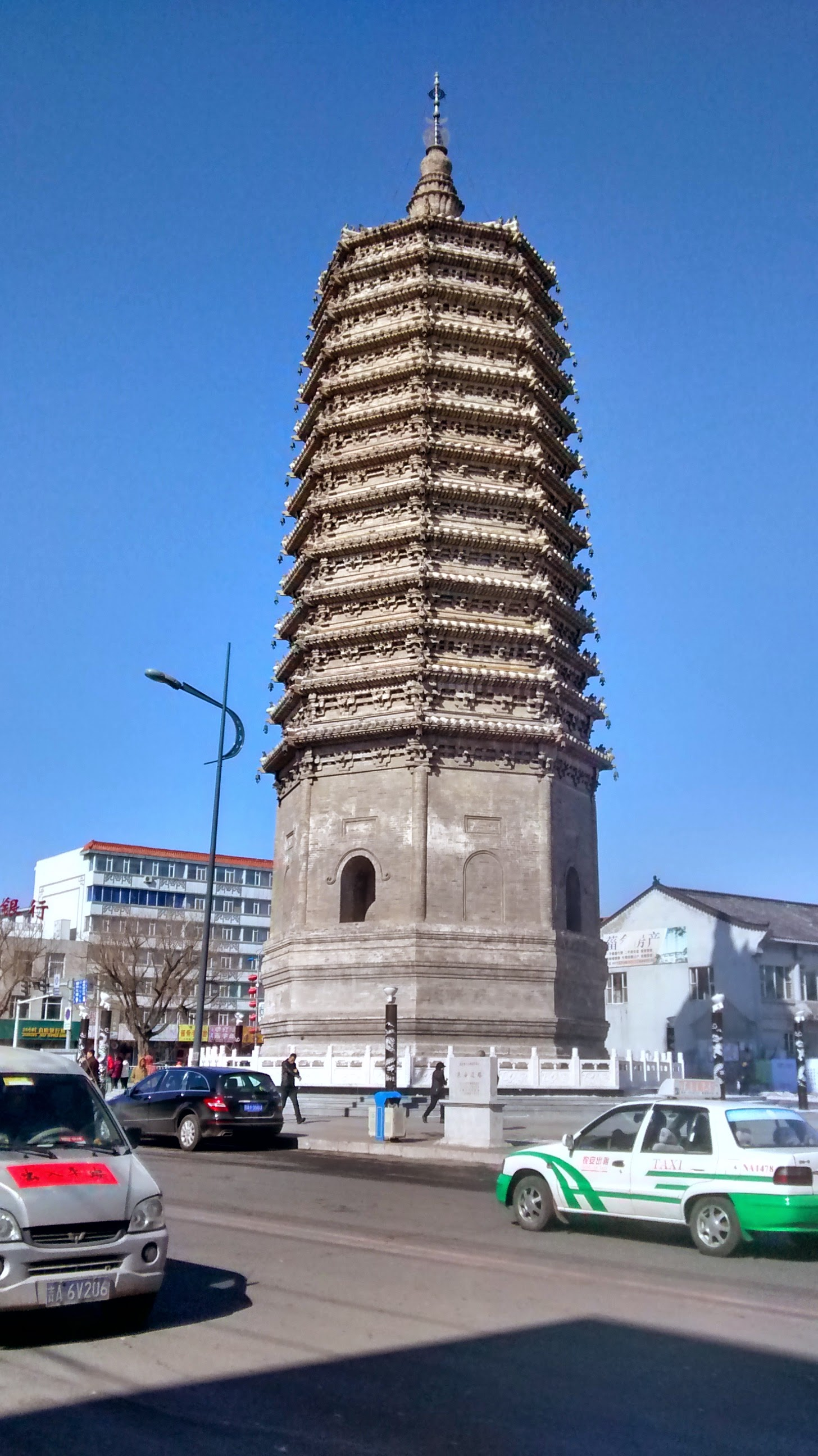

- Location in Jilin
- Coordinates: 44°26′06″N 125°10′30″E
- Country: People's Republic of China
- Province: Jilin
- Sub-provincial city: Changchun

Area
  - Total: 5,236 km^{2} (2,022 sq mi)

Population (2010)
  - Total: 960,759
  - Density: 183.5/km^{2} (475.2/sq mi)
- Time zone: UTC+8 (China Standard)
- Postal code: 1302XX
- Website: nong-an.gov.cn

Nong'an County (simplified Chinese: 农安县; traditional Chinese: 農安縣; pinyin: Nóng'ān Xiàn) is a county of Jilin Province, Northeast China. It is under the administration of the prefecture-level city of Changchun, the capital of Jilin. The westernmost county-level division of Changchun City, it borders Dehui to the east, Kuancheng and Luyuan Districts to the southeast, as well as the prefecture-level cities of Siping to the southwest and Songyuan to the northwest.

== Administrative divisions ==
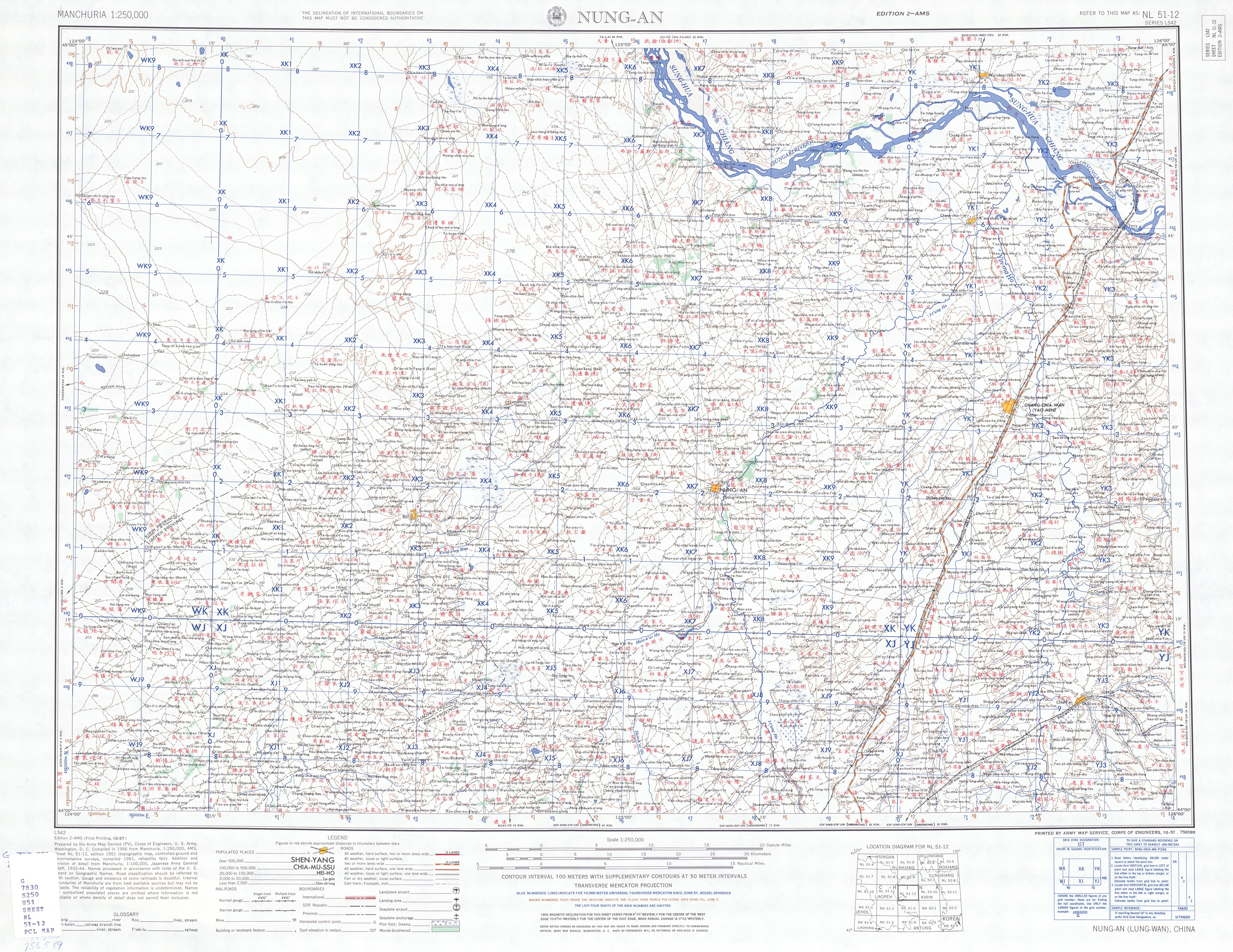
Map including Nong'an (labeled as 農安 (龍灣) NUNG-AN (Lung-wan)) (AMS, 1956)

There are 10 towns and 11 townships under the county's administration.

Towns:

- Nong'an (农安镇), county seat of the Nong'an County
- Fulongquan (伏龙泉镇)
- Halahai (哈拉海镇)
- Kaoshan (靠山镇)
- Kai'an (开安镇)
- Shaoguo (烧锅镇)
- Gaojiadian (高家店镇)
- Huajia (华家镇)
- Sanshengyu (三盛玉镇)
- Bajilei (巴吉垒镇)

Townships:

- Qiangang Township (前岗乡)
- Longwang Township (龙王乡)
- Sangang Township (三岗乡)
- Wanshun Township (万顺乡)
- Yangshulin Township (杨树林乡)
- Yong'an Township (永安乡)
- Qingshankou Township (青山口乡)
- Huangyuquan Township (黄鱼圈乡)
- Xinnong Township (新农乡)
- Wanjinta Township (万金塔乡)
- Xiaochengzi Township (小城子乡)

== Climate ==
Climate data for Nong'an, elevation 170 m (560 ft), (1991–2020 normals, extremes 1981–2010)
Month	Jan	Feb	Mar	Apr	May	Jun	Jul	Aug	Sep	Oct	Nov	Dec	Year
Record high °C (°F)	4.5 (40.1)	14.9 (58.8)	21.8 (71.2)	31.0 (87.8)	35.2 (95.4)	37.8 (100.0)	34.9 (94.8)	34.3 (93.7)	31.3 (88.3)	27.8 (82.0)	20.0 (68.0)	10.5 (50.9)	37.8 (100.0)
Mean daily maximum °C (°F)	−9.9 (14.2)	−4.1 (24.6)	4.5 (40.1)	14.9 (58.8)	22.3 (72.1)	26.9 (80.4)	28.1 (82.6)	26.9 (80.4)	22.3 (72.1)	13.6 (56.5)	1.6 (34.9)	−7.9 (17.8)	11.6 (52.9)
Daily mean °C (°F)	−16.8 (1.8)	−11.2 (11.8)	−1.9 (28.6)	8.3 (46.9)	16.0 (60.8)	21.3 (70.3)	23.5 (74.3)	21.8 (71.2)	15.5 (59.9)	6.9 (44.4)	−4.2 (24.4)	−14.0 (6.8)	5.4 (41.8)
Mean daily minimum °C (°F)	−22.7 (−8.9)	−17.6 (0.3)	−8.2 (17.2)	1.4 (34.5)	9.5 (49.1)	15.7 (60.3)	19.0 (66.2)	17.1 (62.8)	9.1 (48.4)	0.7 (33.3)	−9.4 (15.1)	−19.4 (−2.9)	−0.4 (31.3)
Record low °C (°F)	−37.2 (−35.0)	−35.7 (−32.3)	−27.7 (−17.9)	−11.0 (12.2)	−2.8 (27.0)	3.5 (38.3)	8.0 (46.4)	4.9 (40.8)	−2.8 (27.0)	−13.9 (7.0)	−27.3 (−17.1)	−36.7 (−34.1)	−37.2 (−35.0)
Average precipitation mm (inches)	3.2 (0.13)	4.2 (0.17)	9.8 (0.39)	18.1 (0.71)	53.8 (2.12)	82.1 (3.23)	122.9 (4.84)	107.1 (4.22)	44.7 (1.76)	23.1 (0.91)	12.5 (0.49)	6.5 (0.26)	488 (19.23)
Average precipitation days (≥ 0.1 mm)	4.3	3.4	5.1	5.7	10.0	12.9	13.1	11.9	7.6	6.0	5.3	5.5	90.8
Average snowy days	5.9	4.7	6.1	1.9	0	0	0	0	0	1.3	5.7	7.2	32.8
Average relative humidity (%)	67	59	51	45	51	63	78	79	71	63	64	69	63
Mean monthly sunshine hours	176.9	200.7	235.7	233.5	256.2	247.0	236.1	235.2	238.1	208.9	168.5	157.1	2,593.9
Percentage possible sunshine	62	67	64	58	56	53	51	55	64	62	59	57	59
Source: China Meteorological Administration
